= Águeda (disambiguation) =

Águeda is a city and a municipality in Portugal.

Águeda may also refer to:

== People ==
- Agueda Salazar Martinez (1898–2000), an American artist
  - Agueda Martinez: Our People, Our Country, a 1977 American short documentary film
- Agueda Amaral (born 1972), an East Timorese athlete
- Águeda Dicancro, a Uruguayan sculptor
- Agueda Esteban (1868–1944), a Filipina revolutionary
- Agueda Monasterio de Lattapiat (1776-1817), a heroines of the Chilean War of Independence
- Agueda Kahabagan y Iniquinto (fl. 1896–1901), or Henerala Agueda, woman general of the Philippine army

== Other uses ==
- Águeda (river), a tributary of the Douro river, Spain
- Águeda (freguesia), a former civil parish in Águeda, Portugal
- Águeda (telenovela), a Mexican TV program

== See also ==
- Aguada (disambiguation)
- Castle of Santa Àgueda, Ferreries, Menorca
- Fort Santa Agueda, Guam
