= Belazaima do Chão =

Former civil parish in Portugal

- Civil parish
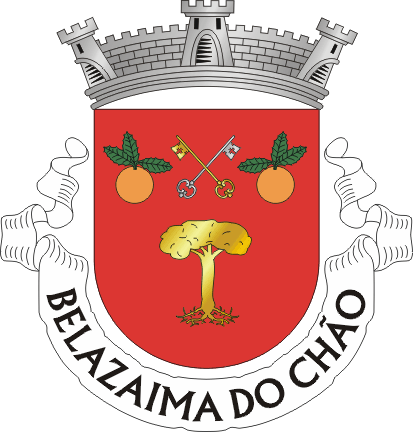
- Coat of arms

- Location in Portugal
- Coordinates: 40°31′58″N 8°21′53″W
- Country: Portugal
- Region: Centro
- Intermunic. comm.: Região de Aveiro
- District: Aveiro
- Municipality: Águeda
- Disbanded: 2013

Area
  - Total: 19.8 km^{2} (7.6 sq mi)

Population (2011)
  - Total: 599
  - Density: 30.3/km^{2} (78.4/sq mi)
- Time zone: UTC+00:00 (WET)
  - Summer (DST): UTC+01:00 (WEST)

Belazaima do Chão was a freguesia ("civil parish") in Águeda Municipality, Aveiro District, Portugal. It had an area of 19.8 km^{2} and in 2011 had a population of 599.

== History ==
In 2013 it was merged with Castanheira do Vouga and with Agadão to form the new freguesia of Belazaima do Chão, Castanheira do Vouga e Agadão.

== Places ==
- Alvarim
- Belazaima do Chão
- Belazaima-a-Velha
- Cepos
- Corça
- Feridouro
- Póvoa de S. Domingos
- Póvoa de Vale do Trigo

== Demography ==
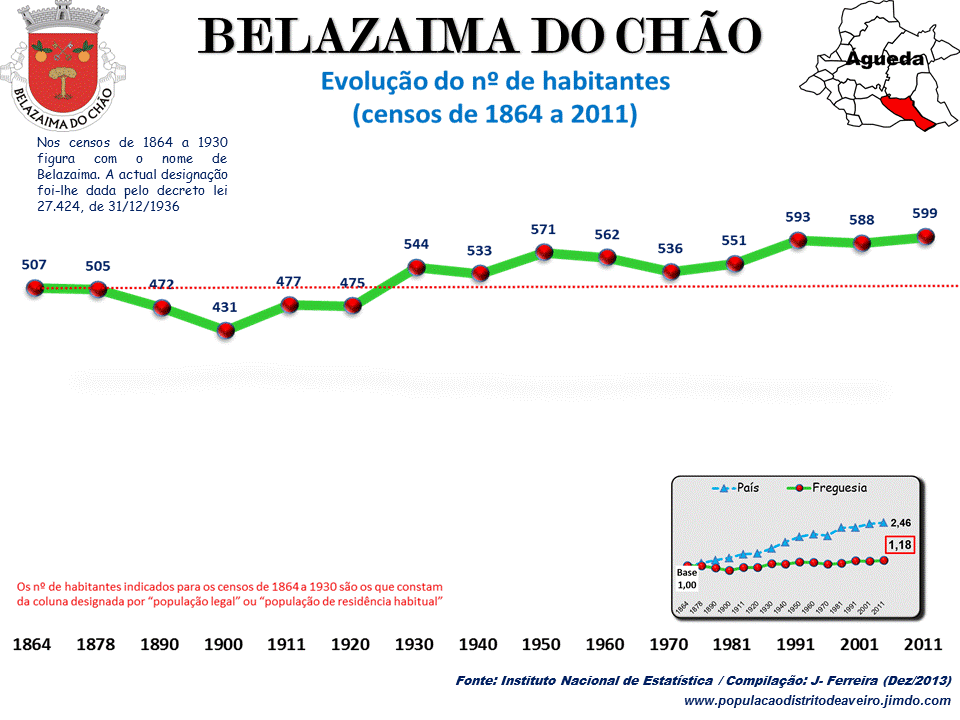
Population from 1864 to 2011

Variation of population from 1864 to 2011

== Politics ==
=== Elections ===
In the 2009 local elections for the Assembly of the Freguesia, there were 579 registered voters, with 454 (78.41%) voting and 125 (21.59%) abstaining. The Social Democratic Party got 365 votes (80.40%), electing six members of the Assembly and the Democratic and Social Centre – People's Party got 70 votes (15.42%), electing one member of the Assembly. As of 31 December 2011, the freguesia had 572 registered voters.

== Religion ==
The Catholic Church's Diocese of Aveiro includes the Parish of Belazaima do Chão as part of the archpriestship of Águeda. The Igreja Matriz de Belazaima do Chão was finished in 1748 and is classified as a Monument of Public Interest.
