= Revigrés =

- Industry: Ceramics
- Founded: 1977
- Founder: Adolfo Roque
- Headquarters: Barrô, Águeda, Portugal
- Revenue: EUR 40,000,000
- Number of employees: 350
- Website: revigres.pt

Revigrés is a Portuguese producer of ceramic wall and floor tiles. It was founded in 1977 by Adolfo Roque (1934–2008), who chaired the company until 2007. The company is headquartered in Barrô, Águeda, Portugal and it is recognized as one of the largest manufacturers of ceramic coverings in the country. In 2024, Revigrés earned 40 million euros in turnover, exported its products to more than 50 countries and employed approximately 350 people.

Revigrés gained significant international visibility through its sponsorship of Futebol Clube do Porto, which began in 1983. This partnership marked the first instance of a Portuguese company sponsoring a top-division football team in the country.

== History ==
Revigrés was established in 1977 by Adolfo Roque and eleven other partners, following a market study that indicated a significant demand for ceramic tiles and a lack of supply in Portugal. The company commenced production in 1981 and initially focused on the domestic market. However, with the installation of a second production line in the same year, it began exploring international markets, such as France, the United Kingdom, Scandinavia, and Canada. In 1986, Portugal's entry into the European Economic Community increased competition in the domestic market, prompting Revigrés to intensify its international expansion.

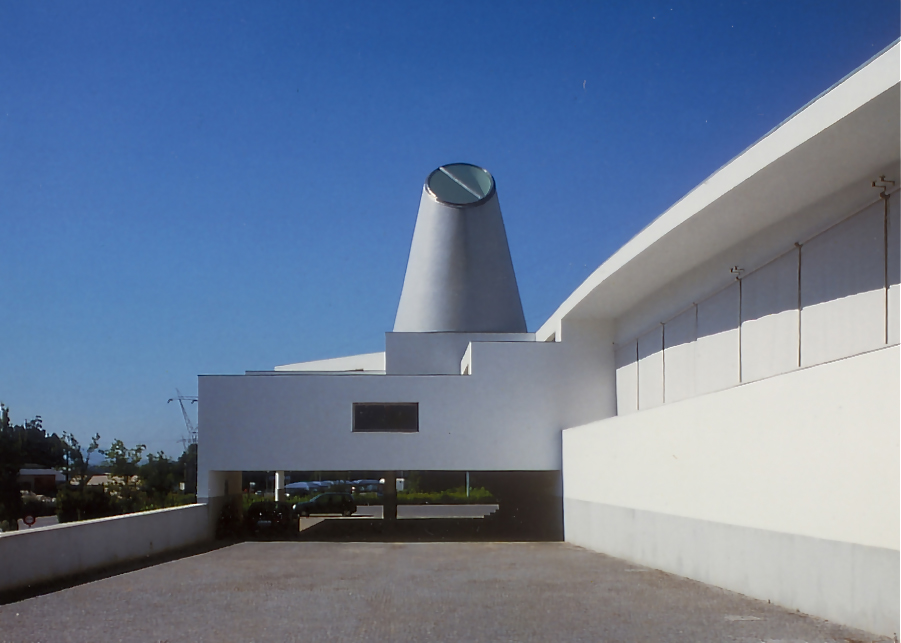
Revigrés Commercial Building in Águeda, Portugal, designed by architect Álvaro Siza Vieira

Starting the project in 1993 Portuguese architect Álvaro Siza Vieira designed and built an exhibition and sales hall at the Revigrés factory site. The Revigrés Commercial Building (which includes an exhibition hall, auditorium and offices) was inaugurated in 1997 to commemorate the 20th anniversary of Revigrés.

In 1999, the company invested 40 million euros to install two manufacturing units dedicated to the production of technical porcelain. This allowed the company to produce ceramics with low water absorption and high durability, suitable for public areas and extreme weather conditions.

Adolfo Roque served as the company's leader for 30 years and played a key role in shaping its growth and brand image. He retired from the presidency at the start of 2007, handing over leadership to José Manuel Cerqueira, a mechanical engineer who held a management position in Revigrés between 1988 and 2004.

Between 2022 and 2024, Revigrés invested in sustainability and innovation, allocating around 25% of its revenue to research and development. Initiatives included the implementation of a photovoltaic power plant in 2023, which reduced carbon dioxide emissions by approximately 1,800 tons per year. The company also invested 15 million euros in a new more energy efficient production line equipped with 3D printing and the option to manufacture using hydrogen.
