= 1748 in architecture =

The year 1748 in architecture involved some significant events.

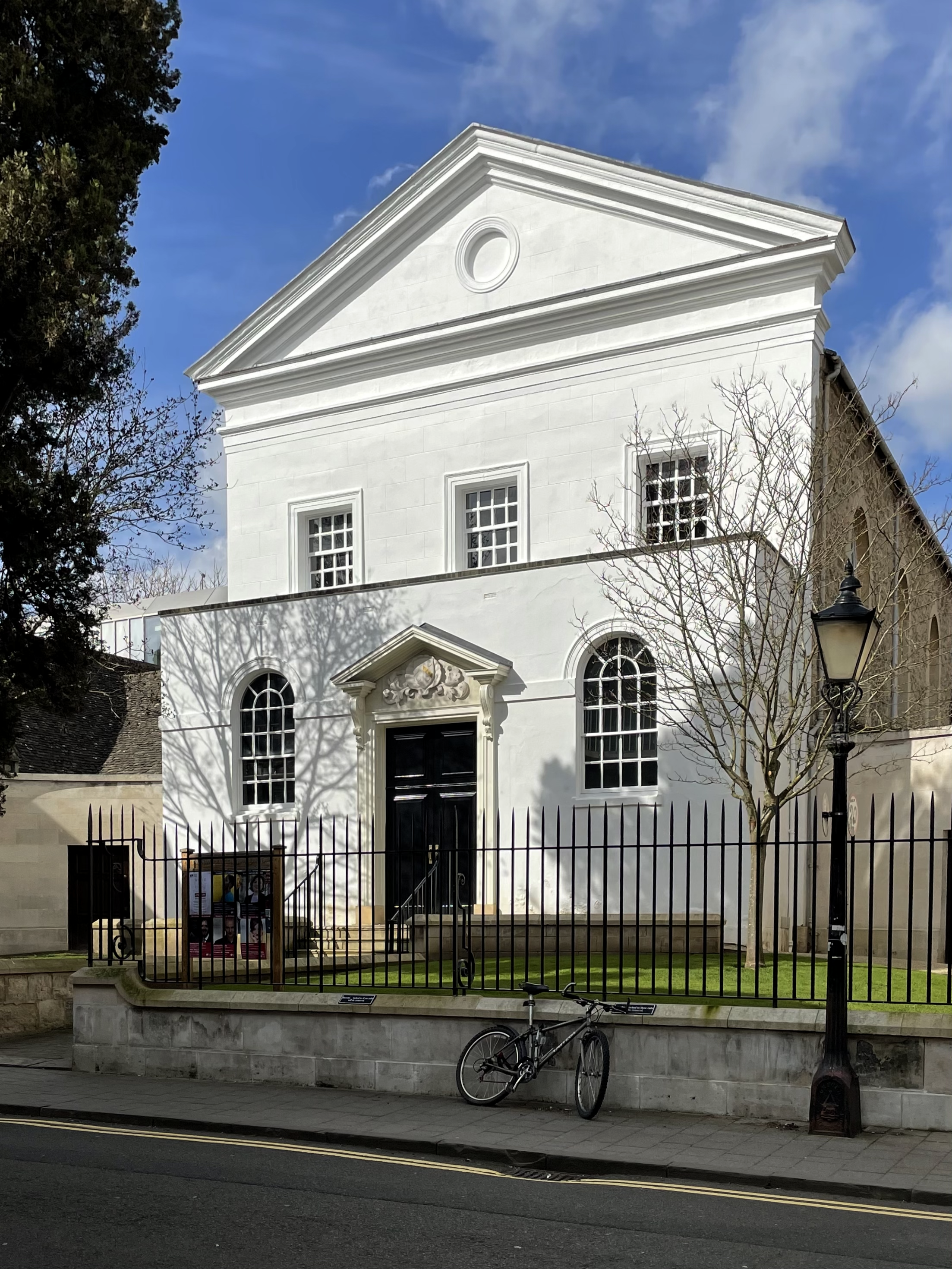
Holywell Music Room, Oxford

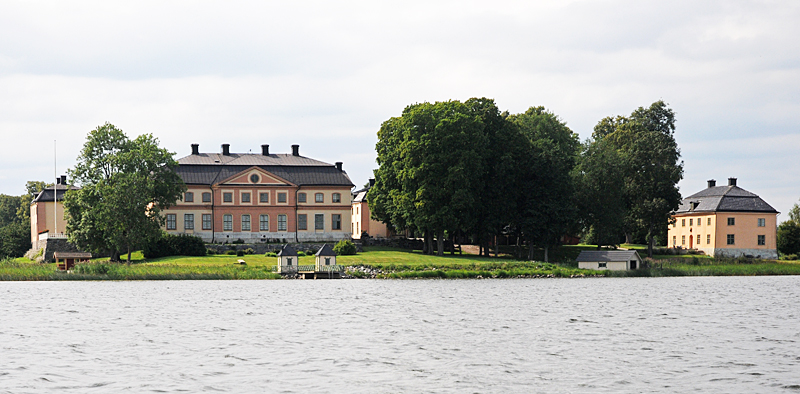
Åkerö Manor, Sweden

== Events ==
- June 24 – On the death of his father William, John Adam inherits his architectural practice in Scotland and the position of Master Mason to the Board of Ordnance, immediately taking his brother Robert into partnership.

== Buildings and structures ==
=== Buildings ===
- Duke Street, Bath, England, designed by John Wood, the Elder.
- Holywell Music Room, Oxford, England, the oldest purpose-built concert hall in Europe, designed by Dr. Thomas Camplin.
- Mansion House, Doncaster, Yorkshire, England, designed by James Paine, is completed.
- Margravial Opera House in Bayreuth, Bavaria, designed by Joseph Saint-Pierre with interior by Giuseppe Galli Bibiena and his son Carlo, is completed.
- Rebuilt Teatro San Samuele in Venice is opened.
- Chapel at Fulneck Moravian Settlement, Yorkshire, England, completed.
- German Church, Gothenburg, Sweden, consecrated.
- Igreja Matriz de Belazaima do Chão, Águeda Municipality, Portugal.
- Åkerö Manor in Södermanland, Sweden, designed by Carl Hårleman, built.
- Honing Hall in Norfolk, England, built.
- Garron Bridge on Inveraray Castle estate in Scotland, designed by Roger Morris and/or his kin Robert Morris, completed.
- Dashashwamedh Ghat at Varanasi in India is built.

== Births ==
- June 22 – John Carter, English draughtsman and architect (died 1817)

== Deaths ==
- April 12 – William Kent, English architect (born c. 1685)
- May 5 – Alessandro Galli Bibiena, Italian architect and painter working in Germany (born 1686)
- June 24 – William Adam, Scottish architect (born 1689)
