= Ramal de Viseu =

Railway line in Portugal

Linha do Vale do Vouga - Ramal de Viseu was a narrow gauge railway in Portugal; the line closed in 1990. This 79 km long metre gauge branch line formerly connected Viseu with the main part of the Vouga line at Sernada do Vouga. Viseu station was also used by trains on the Dão line, now also closed.

The line was worked by diesel traction between the mid 1970s and closure in 1990. Previously all trains had been steam hauled, with considerable risk of trackside fires in hot weather.

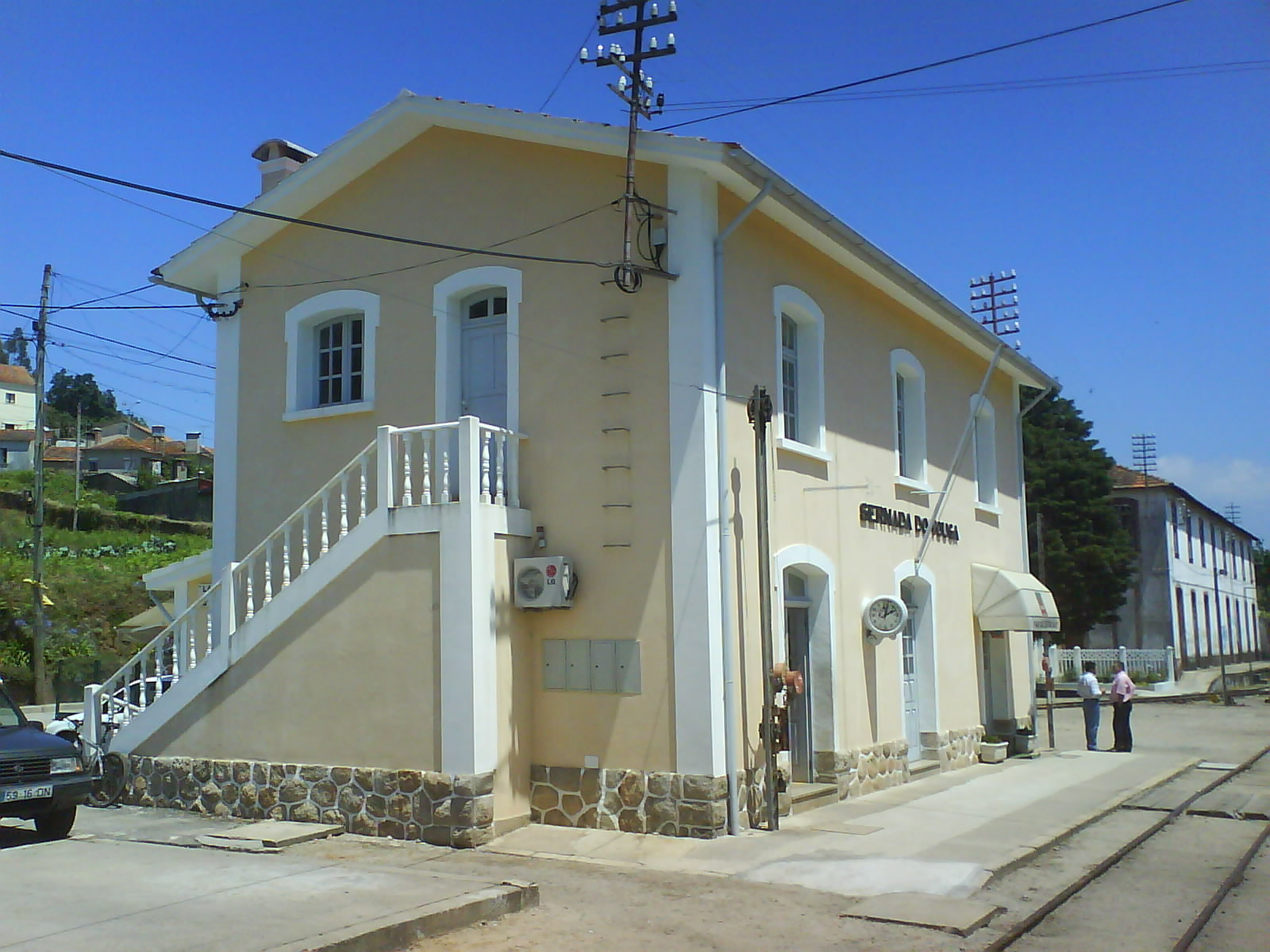
Rail Station of Sernada do Vouga

== See also ==
- Narrow gauge railways in Portugal
- REFER
- CP
