= CP Class 9300 =

Série 9300
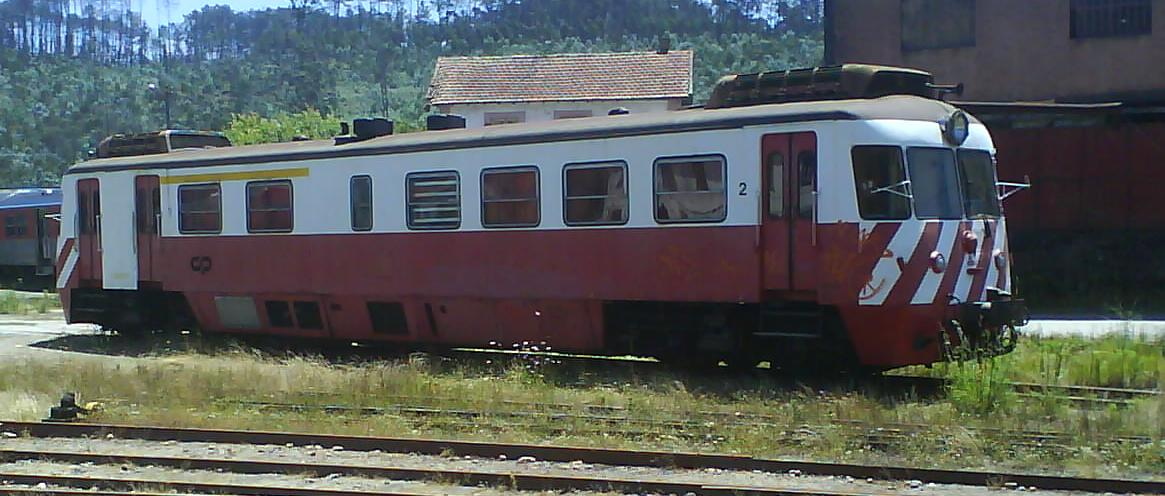
- A Série 9300 railcar at Sernada do Vouga
- Manufacturer: ALLAN
- Entered service: 1954
- Number built: 10 × DMBC+TS
- Formation: DMBC-TS
- Fleet numbers: 8-039301-8 – 8-039310-9; 28-29301-4 – 28-29310-?
- Capacity: DMBC 12F 32S; TS 68

Specifications
- Car length: 19.51 m + 19.51 m
- Wheel diameter: 820 mm
- Maximum speed: 70 kilometres per hour (43 mph)
- Weight: 36.64+20.36 tonnes
- Prime mover: AEC
- Traction motors: Smith
- Power output: 2×160 hp
- UIC classification: Bo'Bo'-de
- AAR wheel arrangement: Bo-Bo
- Wheels driven: 8
- Track gauge: 1000 mm

The Série 9300 were a class of 10 self-propelled diesel railcars built for the metre gauge lines of the Portuguese Railways (CP). They were built by Allan of Rotterdam in 1954; they are similar to the Iberian gauge Série 0300 railcars built by the same manufacturer.

These railcars were used on several different lines, including the Tua line and the Vouga line. They often towed a matching trailer carriage. They were replaced on Vouga line services by Série 9630 diesel multiple units in 2002.

By March 2009 (apart from the Vouga line) the entire network of narrow gauge railway lines in Portugal had been closed.

== See also ==
- Narrow gauge railways in Portugal
