= Aguada de Baixo =

Civil parish in Portugal

- Civil parish
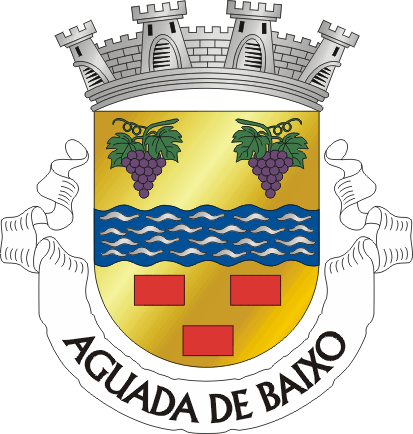
- Coat of arms

- Location in Portugal
- Coordinates: 40°30′33″N 8°27′08″W
- Country: Portugal
- Region: Centro
- Intermunic. comm.: Região de Aveiro
- District: Aveiro
- Municipality: Águeda

Area
  - Total: 4.7 km^{2} (1.8 sq mi)

Population (2011)
  - Total: 1,373
  - Density: 290/km^{2} (760/sq mi)
- Time zone: UTC+00:00 (WET)
  - Summer (DST): UTC+01:00 (WEST)

Aguada de Baixo is a freguesia ("civil parish") in Águeda Municipality, Aveiro District, Portugal. It has an area of 4.7 km2 and in 2011 had a population of 1373. In 2013 it was merged with Barrô as part of an administrative reorganization of the territory and formed the União das Freguesias de Barrô e Aguada de Baixo. It was restored in 2025.

== Geography ==
It is the southernmost freguesia of the municipality, and it borders the Águeda freguesias of Barrô and Aguada de Cima and the municipalities of Anadia e Oliveira do Bairro.

=== Places ===
- Aguadela
- Alto da Póvoa
- Bicarenho
- Landiosa
- Passadouro
- Povoa da Raposa
- Povoa do Nascido
- Vale do Grou
- Vale do Mouro
- Vidoeiro

== Demography ==
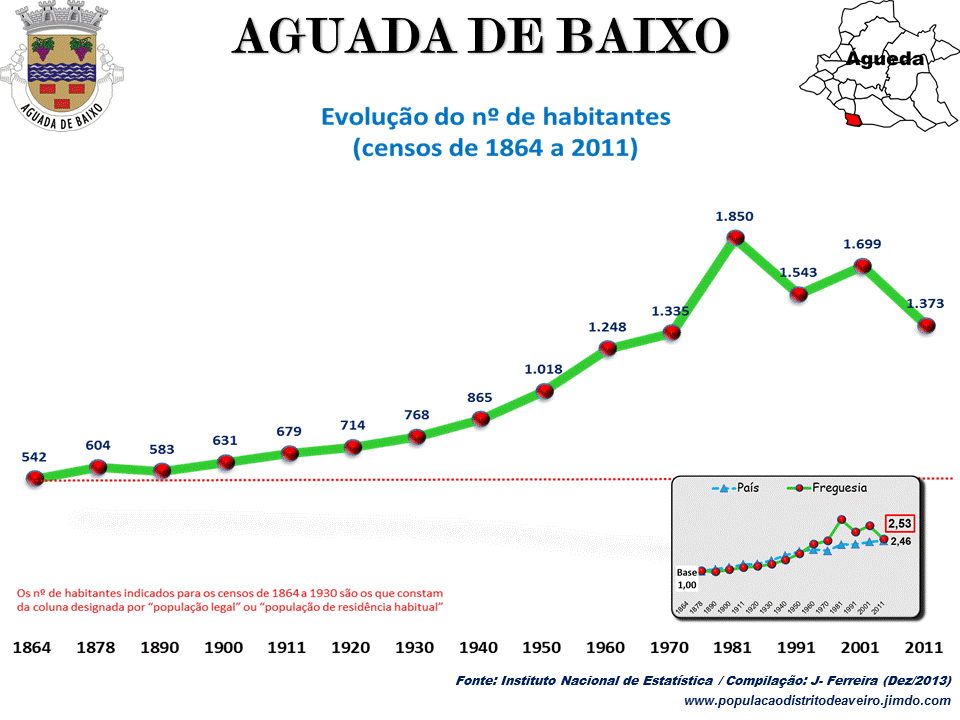
Population from 1864 to 2011

Variation of population from 1864 to 2011

== Politics ==
=== Elections ===
As of 31 December 2011, it had 1532 registered voters. In the 2009 local elections for the Assembly of the Freguesia, there were 1598 registered voters, with 920 (57,57%) voting and 678 (42,43%) abstaining. The Lista Independente de Aguada de Baixo (LIAB) got 527 (57,28%) of the votes, electing five members of the Assembly and the Socialist Party (PS) got 364 votes (39,57%), electing four members of the Assembly.

== Religion ==
The Portuguese Roman Catholic Church's Diocese of Aveiro includes the Parish of Aguada de Baixo as part of the archpriestship of Águeda.

== Notes ==
Article based on the Portuguese Wikipedia article Aguada de Baixo.
