= Casa Batalha =

Jewellery business founded in Portugal in 1635

- Industry: Jewellery
- Founded: 1635
- Headquarters: Quinta da Cruzinha, 3750-836 Valongo do Vouga, Portugal

Casa Batalha is a jewellery family business founded in 1635 by João Cipriano Rodrigues Batalha and the oldest brand in Portugal. Batalha started with the selling of bijouterie and embroidery.

== See also ==
- List of oldest companies
