= António de Vasconcelos Nogueira =

Portuguese philosopher, Social Science researcher, author, and freelance journalist

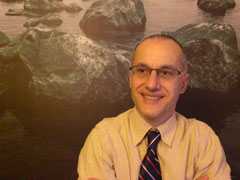
- Born: 26 September 1961 (age 65); Águeda, Portugal
- Occupations: researcher; author; freelance journalist

António Fernando de Vasconcelos Nogueira (born 26 September 1961) is a Portuguese philosopher, Social Science researcher, author, dramatist, and freelance journalist.

== Biography ==
António de Vasconcelos Nogueira was born in Águeda, Portugal. He spent his childhood and part of his adolescence in Luanda, Angola, a former Portuguese colony in Africa, where he attended Catholic primary schools. Back in mainland Portugal, he continued his secondary education at Escola Secundária Marques de Castilho (founded 1927) in Águeda and at Liceu Homem Cristo (founded 1860) in Aveiro.

António de Vasconcelos graduated in Philosophy from Saint Petersburg University (founded 1724). As a second year undergraduate he was admitted as a reader to the prestigious Library of the Russian Academy of Sciences (founded 1747). Subsequently, he gained a degree and master's from the University of Lisbon (founded 1290-1308; 1911) and later a Ph.D. in philosophy from the University of Aveiro, where he undertook post doctoral research in economic history.

Early in his career he started teaching. From 1991 to 1993 António de Vasconcelos taught philosophy and psychology at public high schools such as Escola C+S José Falcão de Miranda do Corvo (founded 1972), Coimbra, Liceu Homem Cristo (founded 1860) and Escola Secundária Dr. Mário Sacramento (founded 1893), all in Aveiro.

His academic career has been, since the middle 1990s, at different private institutes and public colleges, lecturing in Social Science disciplines. From 1993 to 1996 António de Vasconcelos was Visiting Professor of Anthropology and Ethics at Instituto Piaget, Vila Nova de Gaia. From 1996 to 1998, of Sociology at Instituto Português de Administração de Marketing; and again from 2001 to 2002, of Culture; II Semester 2002 of Economic History at University of Aveiro; and I Semester 2005 of Interfaith Dialogue at Instituto Superior de Ciências Religiosas de Aveiro. From 2002 to 2004 he had tutorial groups at Centro Integrado de Formação de Professores, University of Aveiro.

Specialized research work followed these fields. From 1999 to 2001 António de Vasconcelos focused on Jewish Studies and Portuguese diaspora; from 2003 to 2005, he concentrated on Portuguese emigration from Madeira to the British West Indies, British Guyana, Hawaii, the Midwest in the US, and Brazil, during the second half of 19th century. Since 2006 he has been doing research on Portuguese immigration to the Grand Duchy of Luxembourg.

As a freelance journalist, since 2007 he has worked for Contacto, a Portuguese weekly newspaper (founded 1970) published in Luxembourg. From 1996 to 1997 he worked for Diário de Aveiro (founded 1985), a regional daily newspaper, and in 1988 for O Diário (1976–1990), published in Lisbon.

Other interests include Travelling, History of Art, Drawing and Painting, Creative Writing, Shiatsu as a therapy and Christian Meditation.

== Works ==
António de Vasconcelos’ views on Philosophy and Social Science deal with Ethics, History of Philosophy, Economic History, Portuguese Studies and Jewish Studies. Main sources, subjects and influences, stem from Ancient Philosophical writings and authors such as Plato, Seneca and Augustine of Hippo; from Modern Philosophy – René Descartes, Brother Lawrence, Blaise Pascal and Immanuel Kant; and from Contemporary Philosophy and Social Science – Miguel de Unamuno y Jugo, Nicolau Berdiaev, Albert Schweitzer, António Sérgio, Wladyslaw Tatarkiewicz, Joaquim de Carvalho, Antoine de Saint-Exupéry, María Zambrano, Hannah Arendt, Emmanuel Lévinas, Simone de Beauvoir, Soeur Emmanuelle, António José Saraiva, Joel Serrão, Primo Levi, Eduardo Lourenço and José Gil.

Writing

In 2007 he was awarded The Portuguese National Prize for Theatre ‘Bernardo Santareno’ for The Lamentations of Glückel of Hameln, published in 2008. This drama deals with the vulnerability of human beings, questioning the meaning of life and death, according to one’s faith, beliefs and attitudes. It was inspired by Glückel of Hameln’s Memoirs (1689–1699; 1715–1719), and in certain books of the Bible such as Job, Psalms, Proverbs, Ecclesiastes, Song of Solomon, Wisdom, Sirach and Lamentations. Other sources are: (1) the dramatic works of Gil Vicente, considered the main reference for Portuguese and Spanish drama; Luis Vaz de Camoens’ lyrical poetry in Portuguese and Spanish; Joseph de la Vega; William Shakespeare; Samuel Beckett and Bernardo Santareno. (2) the poetry of Rainer Maria von Rilke and Marina Tsvetaeva; (3) the autobiographical works of Frank McCourt .

In 2001 António de Vasconcelos was awarded The Portuguese Literary Prize ‘José Régio’ for the drama The Master of Königsberg. This first drama was published in 2004, on the occasion of the bi-centennial of Immanuel Kant’s death and it portrays aspects of his life, thoughts and sayings, questioning morals and stereotyping. It is based on: (1) Kant’s correspondence and biographies written by G.B. Jäsche, L. E. Borowski, R. B. Jachmann and A. Ch. Wasianski; (2) and influenced by the dramatic works of Bertolt Brecht and Samuel Beckett.

== Bibliography ==
=== Monographs/books ===
(2011) Os Portugueses no Luxemburgo. Contribuição para a história das migrações. Lisboa: Sítio do Livro.

(2004) Capitalismo e Judaísmo. Contribuição dos Judeus portugueses para a ética capitalista. Lisboa: Fund. Calouste Gulbenkian.

(2004) Das Filosofias ao filosofar. Exercício propedêutico e práticas didácticas. Aveiro: Fund. Jacinto de Magalhães.

(1997) De Re Kantiana. Aveiro: Minerva Central.

(1995) Portugal e o Báltico. Aveiro: Gráfica Aveirense.

=== Chapter in books ===
(2004) «O brasileiro de torna-viagem e o Protestantismo português: influências socio-económicas e imagem” in The Power and Persistence of Stereotyping. Anthony David Barker (ed.), Aveiro: Universidade de Aveiro: 81-94.

=== Journal articles with peer review ===
(2007) “Isaac de Pinto (1717-1787) and the Jewish Problems: Apologetic Letters to Voltaire and Diderot” in History of European Ideas, Elsevier Inc., Ma., 33, Winter: 476-487, with José Luís Cardoso, ISEG-Technical University of Lisbon, Portugal

(2005) “Isaac de Pinto (1717-1787): An Enlightened Economist and Financier” in History of Political Economic, Journal of the Duke University, North Carolina, 37 (2), Winter: 263-292, with José Luís Cardoso, ISEG-Technical University of Lisbon, Portugal

(2004) “Werner Sombart (1863-1941): apontamento biobibliográfico” in Análise Social, vol. xxxviii (169): 1125-1151.

(1999) “Memória da diáspora hispano-portuguesa em Amsterdão: elementos de bibliografia”, in Revista da Universidade de Aveiro, Letras, nº 16: 173-209.

(1997) “Do capitalismo à ética dos negócios” in Sociologia, Problemas e Práticas, nº 24, Jun.: 141-164.

(1997) «Na senda das Invasões Napoleónicas», in Diário Regional de Aveiro, dias 22 e 24 de Abril.

(1996) «Evocação da diáspora sefardita», in Boletim Municipal de Aveiro, Ano XIV, n.º28, Dez.: 73-82.

(1993) «Camões e as Letras russas», in Estudos Aveirenses, Revista do ISCIA, n.º1: 19-22.

(1988) «A “Inês de Castro” de Briullov», in Suplemento Cultural do Diário, Lisboa, 07 de Maio.

=== Review articles ===
(2009) “The Portuguese Nation: Essays on Atlantic and Jewish Studies” concerning Richard L. Kagan and Philip D. Morgan, Atlantic Diasporas. Jews, Conversos, and Crypto-Jews in the Age of Mercantilism, 1500–1800, Baltimore: The Johns Hopkins University Press, in e-JPH, vol. 7, number I, Summer Brown University, RI, Providence

(2005) Ferreira Fernandes, Madeirenses Errantes, Lisboa: Oficina do Livro, 2004, in Análise Social, vol. xl (175): 406-409.
