= Agadão =

Former civil parish in Portugal

- Civil parish
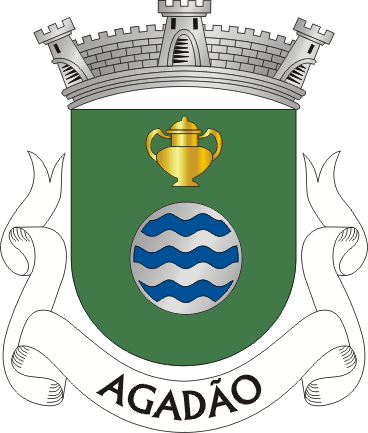
- Coat of arms

- Location in Portugal
- Coordinates: 40°32′23″N 8°18′52″W
- Country: Portugal
- Region: Centro
- Intermunic. comm.: Região de Aveiro
- District: Aveiro
- Municipality: Águeda
- Disbanded: 2013

Area
  - Total: 39.40 km^{2} (15.21 sq mi)

Population (2001)
  - Total: 496
  - Density: 13/km^{2} (33/sq mi)
- Time zone: UTC+00:00 (WET)
  - Summer (DST): UTC+01:00 (WEST)
- Postal code: 3750-000
- Area code: 917
- Patron: Santa Maria Madelana
- Website: http://agadaonanet.blogspot.com

Agadão is a former civil parish located in Águeda Municipality, Portugal. In 2013 it was merged into the new parish Belazaima do Chão, Castanheira do Vouga e Agadão. Its population was less than 500 inhabitants at the 2001 census, in an area of 35.34 km^{2} (14 inhabitants/km^{2}).

== History ==
Agadão was created when the religious parish was de-annexed from Castanheira do Vouga, to establish a new faith community. During the first construction of the main church, around 1220, the manors of Vila Mendo de Cima and Vila Mendo de Baixo within Agadão, were being audited by King Afonso II, as part of his revisions to property rights.

The lands of the parish later pertained to the Counts of Feira, until the last Count Fernando Forjaz Pereira Pimentel de Menezes e Silva died in 1700 without an heir, and those lands were transferred to the Casa do Infantado (that included several seigneurial holdings confiscated from the Spanish after the Portuguese Restoration War).

The parish church was constructed in the 18th century on the hilltop locality of Lomba. But the region also includes many minor chapels scattered throughout the villages and hamlets, some in various states of decay or degradation, such as: Chapel of Menino Jesus (Caselho), Chapel of São Bartolomeu (Alcafaz), Chapel of Senhora da Paz (Sobreira), Chapel of Santa Bárbara (Felgueira), Chapel of São Tomé (Guístola) and the Chapel of São João (Catraia).

== Geography ==
Agadão is situated in the southeast corner of the municipality of Águeda, occupying the valley at the foot of the Serra do Caramulo, sustained by the Agadão River (a tributary of the Águeda River), that meanders north to south. It is located approximately 16 kilometers from the municipal seat. It contains the localities Alcafaz, Bertufo, Boa Aldeia, Caselho, Corga da Serra, Felgueira, Foz, Guistola, Guistolinha, Lázaro, Lomba, Lousa, Povinho, Sobreira and Vila Mendo.

Its immediate neighbors include the parishes of Belazaima do Chão (along the southwest), Castanheira do Vouga (to the northwest), as well as the parishes of Pala in the southern municipality of Mortágua, and Mosteirinho and São João do Monte in the eastern municipality of Tondela.

== Economy ==
In addition to agriculture, the forestry sector and industry are the dominant economic activities in the local villages. Another of the main industries is water-bottling, which has supported the economy of this parish, and primarily of the village of Alcafaz.

== Architecture ==
=== Religious ===
- Chapel of São Bartolomeu (Portuguese: Capela de São Bartolomeu), located in the community of Alcafaz;
- Chapel of Santo André (English: Capela de Bertufo/Capela de Santo André), located in Berturfo;
- Chapel of Nossa Senhora da Paz (English: Capela da Sobreira/Capela da Senhora da Paz), located in Sobreira, the chapel is dedicated to Our Lady of Peace;
- Chapel of Santa Bárbara (Portuguese: Capela de Felgueiras/Capela de Santa Bárbara), located in Felgueira.
- Church of Santa Maria Madelana (Portuguese: Igreja Paroquial de Agadão/Igreja de Santa Maria Madalena), centre of the parishes' religious life, the historic church hold celebrations between 20 and 21 June, in honour of the Sacred Heart of Jesus and Saint Mary Magdalene;

== Culture ==
The parish's gastronomic specialties include chanfana (a rich lamb stew cook in a cast-iron pot slowly for 5 hours) and broa de milho (a traditional bread made from corn and wheat flour).
