= Eduardo Veiga =

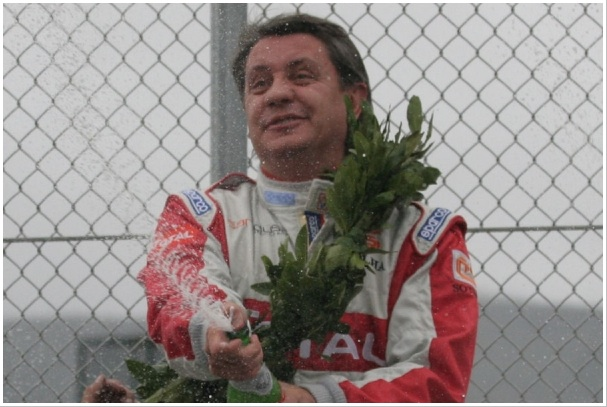
- Podium Portuguese Rallycross Championship
- Nationality: Portuguese
- Born: October 20, 1962 (age 64) Aguada de Baixo (Portugal)

Eduardo Manuel Brito e Veiga, was born on 20 October 1962, in Aguada de Baixo, a small village in the center of Portugal; he is considered one of the best national off-road drivers.

== Career ==
In his long career as a driver, Veiga has more than 50 podiums. He was in 1997, Portuguese Champion of Kartcross and two-time champion of the Portuguese Championship of Rallycross in 2004 and 2005. He also has his name in the podium of the National Cup of Kartcross, in the Off-road trophies and in the European Championship of Autocross in Murça with a second-place finish.

In 2010, Veiga finished second in the Portuguese Championship of Rallycross, after a problem with his Saab 9-3 Turbo when everything was pointing to another championship for him.

Also in 2010, Veiga made his debut in Rallying by entering the Rally of Fafe with Paulo Torres as his co-driver. They were obliged to quit the event after experiencing some mechanical problems in their Mitsubishi Lancer Evolution VIII, prepared by 'Peres Competitions'. Once again with Torres, he participated in the Rally of Portugal, an event of the World Rally Championship, and once again, the luck was not on his side and they end up quitting again, in the last day, due to an accident.

Veiga will continue is Rallying career this year, having already confirmed presence in Rally Torrie, Rally of Portugal, Rally of Madeira, and Rally of Mortágua driving a Mitsubishi Lancer Evolution VIII from Peres Competitions.

This year also, the Saab 9-3 Turbo will make its reappearance in the hands of Veiga in Rampa da Falperra and in the European Championship of Rallycross at Montalegre.

== Colin McRae: Dirt ==
Veigas's car appears as a base car in the game Colin McRae: Dirt, something that no other Portuguese driver has ever achieved. To ensure realism in the game, the software developers asked for more than 10 Gb of pictures, a detailed list of the car's setup, and reports of the car's behavior on the track. This process took more than two years.

Eduardo Veiga Colin McRae Dirt

== Sporting positions ==
Year	POSITION	COMPETITION
1995	3rd	National Cup of Kartcross
1996	3rd	Nacional Cup of Kartcross
1997	1st	National Championship of Kartcross
1999	2nd	National Championship of Rallycross
	3rd	National Championship of Autocross
2000	2nd	National Championship of Rallycross
	2nd	National Championship of Autocross
2001	1st	National Trophy de Off-road
	2nd	National Championship of Rallycross
2003	2nd	National Championship of Rallycross
2004	1st	National Championship of Rallycross
	1st	National Trophy of Rallycross
	2nd	European Championship of Autocross - Murça
2005	1st	National Championship of Rallycross
2006	2nd	National Championship of Rallycross
2007	2nd	National Championship of Rallycross
2008	2nd	National Championship of Rallycross
2009		
2010	2nd	National Championship of Rallycross
