= Borralha =

Former civil parish in Portugal

- Civil parish
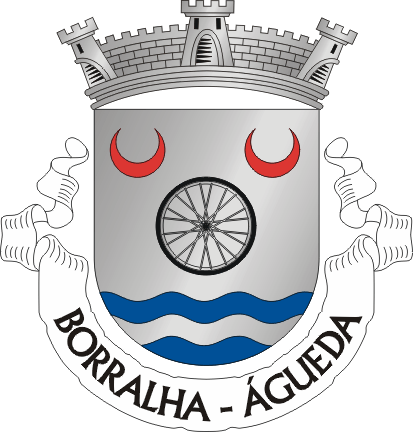
- Coat of arms

- Location in Portugal
- Coordinates: 40°33′16″N 8°26′15″W
- Country: Portugal
- Region: Centro
- Intermunic. comm.: Região de Aveiro
- District: Aveiro
- Municipality: Águeda
- Disbanded: 2013

Area
  - Total: 9.6 km^{2} (3.7 sq mi)

Population (2011)
  - Total: 2,230
  - Density: 230/km^{2} (600/sq mi)
- Time zone: UTC+00:00 (WET)
  - Summer (DST): UTC+01:00 (WEST)

Borralha was a freguesia ("civil parish") in Águeda Municipality, Aveiro District, Portugal. It had an area of 9.6 km2 and in 2011 had a population of 2230.

== History ==
In 2013 it was merged with Águeda to form the new freguesia of Águeda e Borralha.

== Places ==
- Agueiro
- Alteiralto
- Alto do Vale do Grou
- Amaínho
- Brejo
- Candam
- Carrasqueira
- Casais
- Casarão Castinceira
- Catraia
- Chapado
- Horta Velha
- Lomba
- Machuqueira
- Nova Borralha
- Pinheirais
- Redolho
- S. Tiago
- Vale do Forno
- Vista

== Demography ==
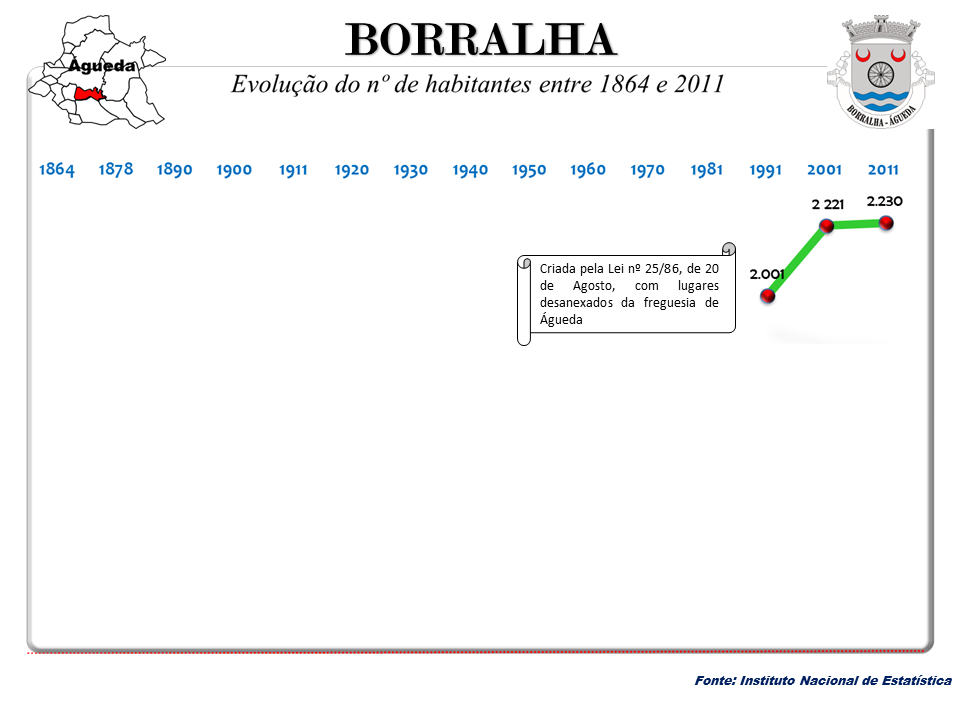
Population from 1864 to 2011

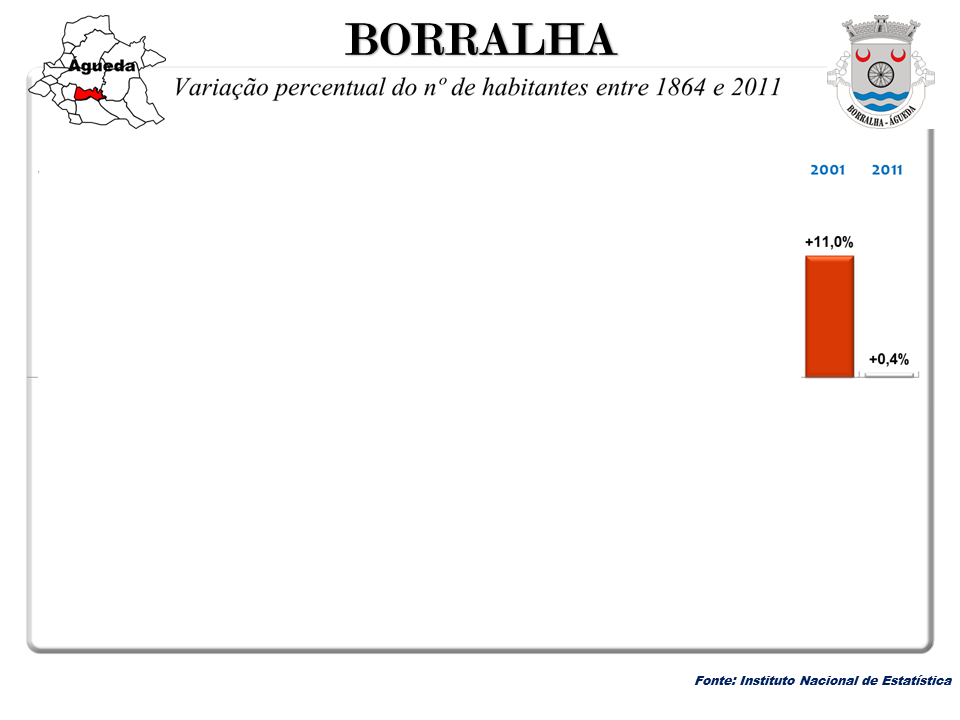
Variation of population from 1864 to 2011

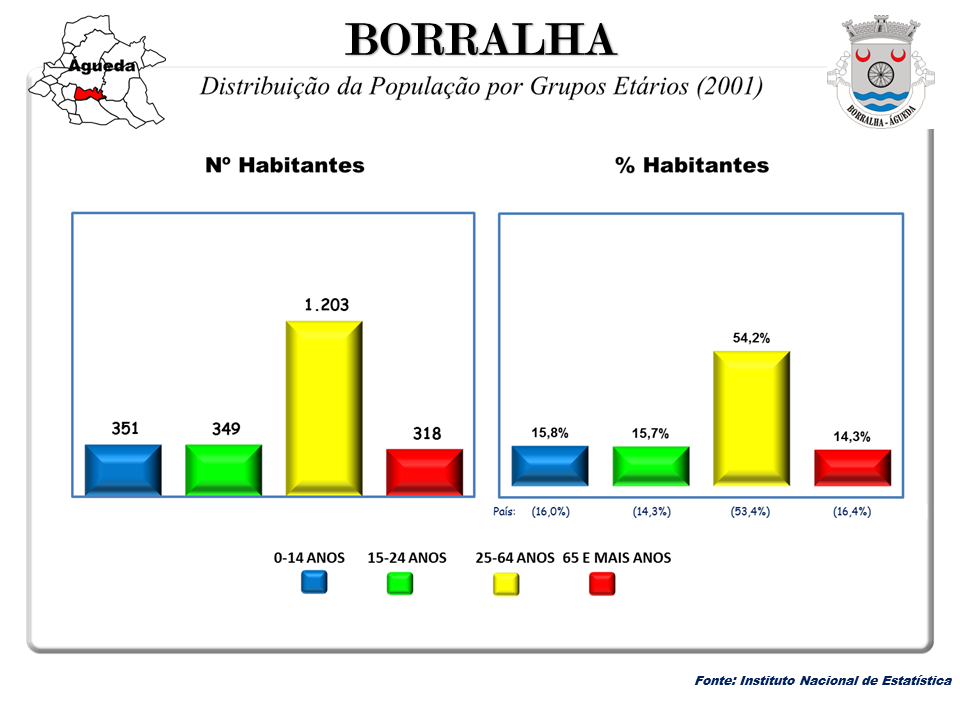
Distribution of population in 2001

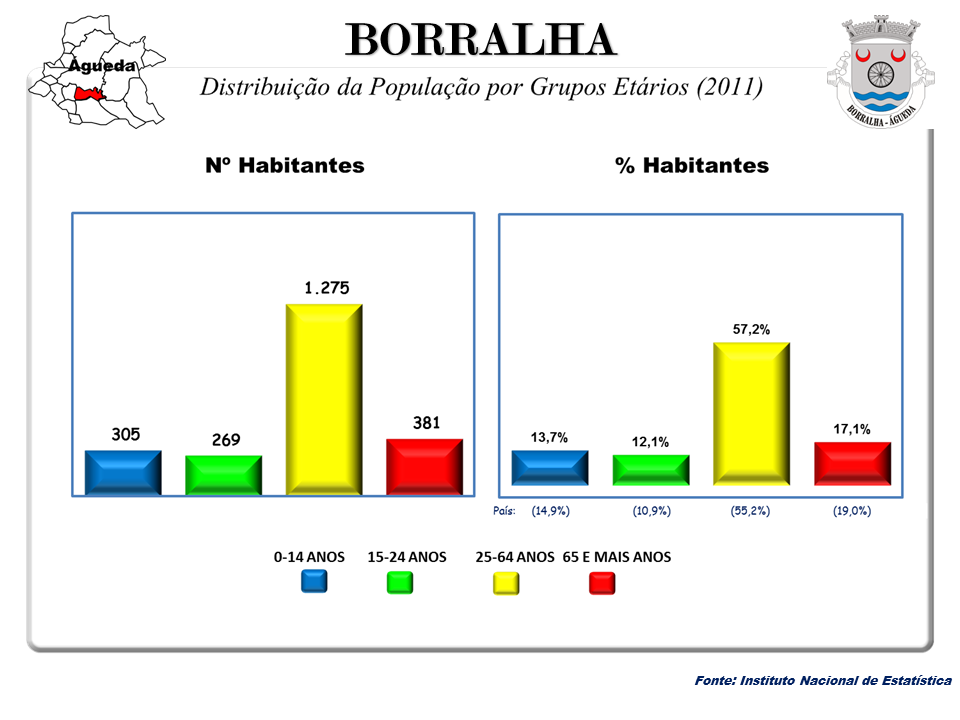
Distribution of population in 2011

== Religion ==
The Catholic Church's Diocese of Aveiro includes the Parish of Borralha as part of the archpriestship of Águeda.
