= Aguada =

Aguada may refer to:

== Places ==
=== Central and South America ===
- Aguada, Santander, a town and municipality in northeastern Colombia
- Aguada, Montevideo, a neighbourhood of Montevideo, Uruguay
- Aguada, Puerto Rico, a municipality of Puerto Rico
- Aguada de Pasajeros, a municipality and town in Cienfuegos Province, Cuba
- Aguada de Moya, a ward and town in Villa Clara Province, Cuba
- Isla Aguada, a locality in Carmen Municipality, Campeche, Mexico
- La Aguada, Pichilemu, a village in Cardenal Caro Province, Chile
- La Aguada y Costa Azul, a village in the Rocha Department, Uruguay

=== Asia ===
- Aguada, a district of Placer, Masbate, Philippines
- Fort Aguada, a 17th-century fort in Goa, India
- Castella de Aguada, a fort in Bandra, Mumbai, India

=== Europe ===
- Aguada de Cima, a civil parish in Águeda, Centro Region, Portugal

== Other uses ==
- Aguada (meteorite), a meteorite which fell in 1930 near Cordoba, Argentina

== See also ==
- Aguadas
- Águeda (disambiguation)
- Salinas y Aguada Blanca National Reserve, Peru
- Mossel Bay, South Africa, originally called Aguada de São Brás
