= Barrô (Águeda) =

Civil parish in Portugal

- Civil parish
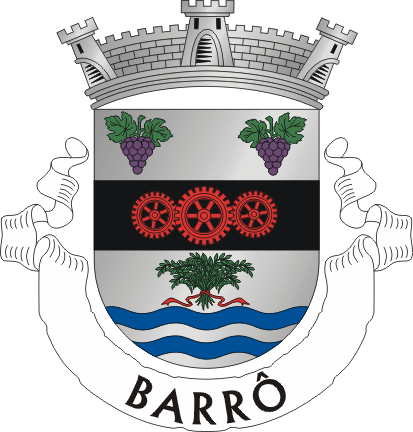
- Coat of arms

- Location in Portugal
- Coordinates: 40°32′11″N 8°28′12″W
- Country: Portugal
- Region: Centro
- Intermunic. comm.: Região de Aveiro
- District: Aveiro
- Municipality: Águeda

Area
  - Total: 7 km^{2} (2.7 sq mi)

Population (2011)
  - Total: 1,836
  - Density: 260/km^{2} (680/sq mi)
- Time zone: UTC+00:00 (WET)
  - Summer (DST): UTC+01:00 (WEST)

Barrô is a freguesia ("civil parish") in Águeda Municipality, Aveiro District, Portugal. It had an area of 7 km2 and in 2011 had a population of 1836.

== History ==
In 2013 it was merged with Aguada de Baixo to form the new freguesia of Barrô e Aguada de Baixo. It was restored in 2025.

== Places ==
- Barrô
- Carqueijo

== Demography ==
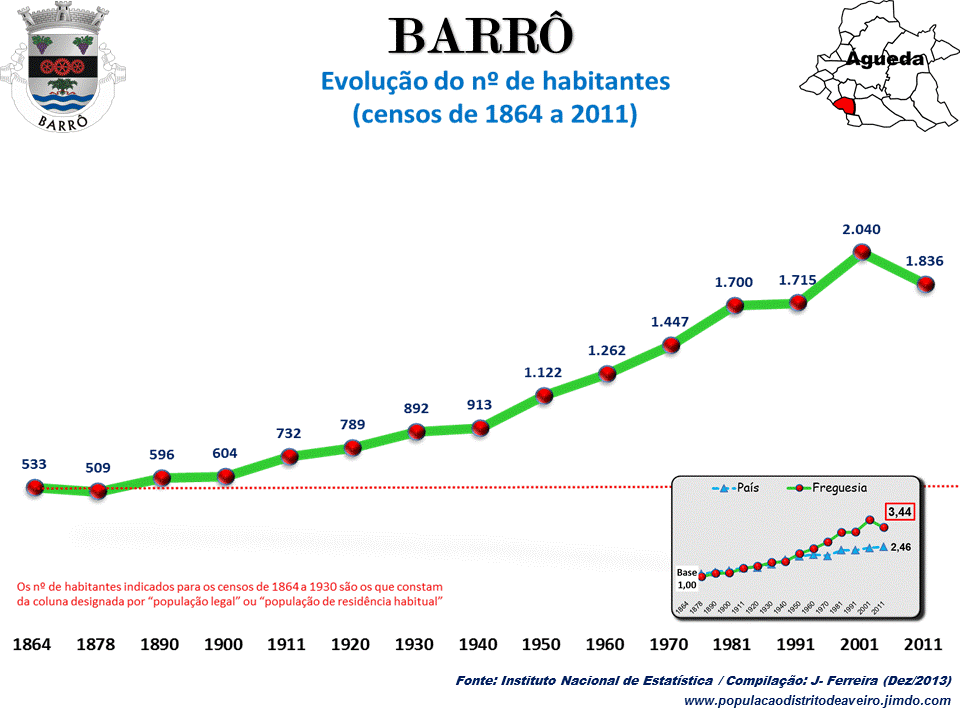
Population from 1864 to 2011

Variation of population from 1864 to 2011

== Politics ==
=== Elections ===
As of 31 December 2011, it had 1722 registered voters. In the 2009 local elections for the Assembly of the Freguesia, there were 1711 registered voters, with 1013 (59.21%) voting and 698 (40.79%) abstaining. The Social Democratic Party got 527 (57,28%) of the votes, electing six members of the Assembly and the Socialist Party got 368 votes (36.33%), electing three members of the Assembly.

== Religion ==
The Catholic Church's Diocese of Aveiro includes the Parish of Barrô as part of the archpriestship of Águeda. There is a church and a chapel in this former freguesia, both from the 17th century.
