= Agueda Monasterio de Lattapiat =

- Born: 1776; Chile
- Died: February 6, 1817 (aged 40–41)
- Occupations: Spy and courier
- Known for: One of the national heroines of the Chilean War of Independence
- Spouse: Jean Lattapiat
- Children: 5
- Parent(s): Antonia Lemus Silva and Don Ignacio Monasterio
- Espionage activity
- Country: Chile
- Allegiance: Rebels

Agueda Monasterio de Lattapiat (1776-1817), was a woman involved in the Chilean War of Independence. She served as a spy and courier for the rebels.

== Early life ==
=== Family life ===
Agueda Monasterio de Lattapiat was born into a middle-class home in Chile. She was born to Antonia Lemus Silva and Don Ignacio Monasterio. Both families were well known and respected. Don Ignacio Monasterio was a merchant creating a comfortable life for Agueda and her seven siblings. Four of the children were boys and the other four were girls. Her family was among the earliest Chilean settlers who desired an economy for Chile as well as a democracy. At the young age of fourteen she married Jean Lattapiat. He was a French naval officer whose reputation relied on his defense of the port of Buenos Aires.

=== Marriage ===
Jean Lattapiat was employed by the French navy in order to defend the port of Buenos Aires, after the British launched a naval attack. Politician, writer, and journalist Vicente Grez noted about the couple that "his sword was known and feared, but her character was also as strong as steel." Together they had five children, Francisco, Bruno, Juan, Manuela and Juana.

== Involvement in the Revolution ==
=== First Noted Display of Bravery ===
Royalists wanted to have the Crown remain in power, and to suppress any revolution that might occur. Tension was so high during this time "that virtually every man in Santiago carried a weapon in the streets." Often fighting broke out in the middle of the street, this was generally known as "Figueroa's mutiny." This time, though her son was caught in the gunfire on April 1, 1811. Her earliest display of bravery and willingness to die for her children, as she ran amidst gunfire to bring her fallen son to safety.

=== Her Part in the Revolution ===
During this time a restriction was placed by the Spanish Crown on trading with the French, English, and Americans. Using this anger and oppression she encouraged tradesmen to be politically discontent. This is important because of the vast number of places tradesmen visit and the large number of people they see. If one tradesmen is discontent many more may follow his influence. This spreads the Revolutionary spirit as well as aid for it. Those that felt strongly about the independence of Chile could learn from the tradesmen what like minded people were doing and where they were meeting.

Agueda was an essential part of the spying in Chile. Her name was easily known due to her and her husband's prosperous families, making it understandable people would be at her house often. Her house was also in an extremely convenient location, becoming the hub of information. Vicente Grez states,

In her living room, a modest room for sure, were not gathered the elegant society, but rather people more serious, even severe, in outlook, those who lived by their work and owed to their [business] success those comforts and pleasures that were theirs. Their society constituted the democratic forces after the revolution; they were most interested in their own independence along with that of the republic.

Agueda and her daughter, Juana, sent secret letters between committees that were involved in organizing the revolt in their own home. She became responsible for the incoming and outgoing mail of exiled officials. The messages Agueda Monasterio De Lattapiat sent notified exiled officials of the rebel news of Chile. These notifications would help the exiles plan an attack on the Spaniards in Chile at the perfect time. Jean Lattapiat worked for Chile's independence, thus making him an exile. This added persecution of her husband put an emotional strain of Agueda. Agueda was well known in Chile due to her family history with Spanish Royalty and her husband's military background. While this did help with the goings and coming of rebels it made it difficult for her to send information to the officials. The Spanish government became suspicious of her spying and soon warned her that if she continued she would go to prison.

== Time in Jail ==
After continuing to spy, send letters and being a hub for the revolution, she was thrown into prison. In late 1816 a second revolution was stirring from the patriots and the Royalists wanted her to reveal her contacts. They believed this would prevent another revolution. At the risk of her own life she refused to reveal her allies. The Spanish governor ordered gallows to be built in the city's main plaza, so she could see it from her cell. She was not allowed to speak to her family or any friends. This alone was painful but the interrogations were mentally straining and the lack of food weakened her physical strength. When the display of imminent death did not deter her, the Spanish governor, known to be "capable of ferocious cruelty" threatened to cut off her daughter's' hand as she watched. Not only would cutting off her hand affect Agueda's emotional state but Juana was very involved in the revolution as well. At this threat from the Spanish King Royalists stepped in to stop this insane plan. They released her from prison, and escorted Agueda and Juana home. This was not because of compassion for Agueda but her strong popularity with the people would most certainly cause an uprising.

== Death ==
Agueda Monasterio De Lattapiat died a few days after her release from prison. The mental and emotional strain had proven to be fatal. She died on February 6, 1817, six days before the patriots Victory at Chacabuco on February 12, 1817.

== Sources ==
- Amunategui, M. L., & D. B., Arana. (1877). Revista chilena (Vol. 9) (J. Nunez, Ed.). Santiago : Imprenta de la Republica.
- Águeda Monasterio: una integrante del servicio de informaciones durante la Reconquista en Chile. (n.d.). Retrieved December 4, 2017,
- Johnson, J. J., & Carmagnani, M. A. (2017, October 18). Struggle for independence. Retrieved December 5, 2017, from Chile - Struggle for independence
- R. Adams, Jerome: Notable Latin American Women: Twenty-nine Leaders, Rebels, Poets, Battlers and spies, 1500-1900 MacFarland (1995)
- Águeda Monasterio: una integrante del servicio de informaciones durante la Reconquista en Chile | Chile | España
- Las mujeres de la independencia: 07
