= Travassô e Óis da Ribeira =

Civil parish in Portugal

- Civil parish
- Location in Portugal
- Coordinates: 40.593°N 8.500°W
- Country: Portugal
- Region: Centro
- Intermunic. comm.: Região de Aveiro
- District: Aveiro
- Municipality: Águeda
- Established: 2013

Area
  - Total: 11.12 km^{2} (4.29 sq mi)

Population (2011)
  - Total: 2,305
  - Density: 207.3/km^{2} (536.9/sq mi)
- Time zone: UTC+00:00 (WET)
  - Summer (DST): UTC+01:00 (WEST)

Travassô e Óis da Ribeira is a freguesia in Águeda Municipality, Aveiro District, Portugal. The population in 2011 was 2,305, in an area of 11.12 km^{2}.

== History ==
The freguesia was established in 2013.
