= Recardães e Espinhel =

Civil parish in Portugal

- Civil parish
- Location in Portugal
- Coordinates: 40.567°N 8.492°W
- Country: Portugal
- Region: Centro
- Intermunic. comm.: Região de Aveiro
- District: Aveiro
- Municipality: Águeda

Area
  - Total: 19.92 km^{2} (7.69 sq mi)

Population (2011)
  - Total: 6,036
  - Density: 300/km^{2} (780/sq mi)
- Time zone: UTC+00:00 (WET)
  - Summer (DST): UTC+01:00 (WEST)

Recardães e Espinhel is a freguesia in Águeda Municipality, Aveiro District, Portugal. The population in 2011 was 6,036, in an area of 19.92 km^{2}.

== History ==
The freguesia was established in 2013.
