= Linha do Vouga =

Location on the network
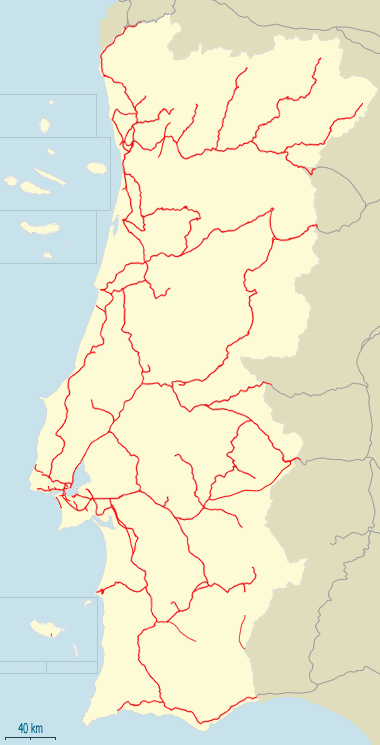

+ Aveiro × Espinho (🔎)

Linha do Vouga (the Vouga line) is the last surviving metre gauge railway line in Portugal still operated by Comboios de Portugal. The other remaining metre gauge lines (the Corgo, Tâmega and Tua lines) all closed in 2009.

The Vouga line serves Aveiro, Agueda, Sernada do Vouga, Albergaria-a-Velha, Oliveira de Azeméis, São João da Madeira, Santa Maria da Feira, and Espinho.

Since 2002, services on the line have largely been operated by CP's Série 9630 diesel multiple units, which replaced the previous ex-Yugoslav Série 9700 diesel multiple units and the Dutch-built Série 9300 railcars.

The section between Sernada do Vouga and Viseu is currently closed to commercial traffic but rehabilitation works are ongoing.

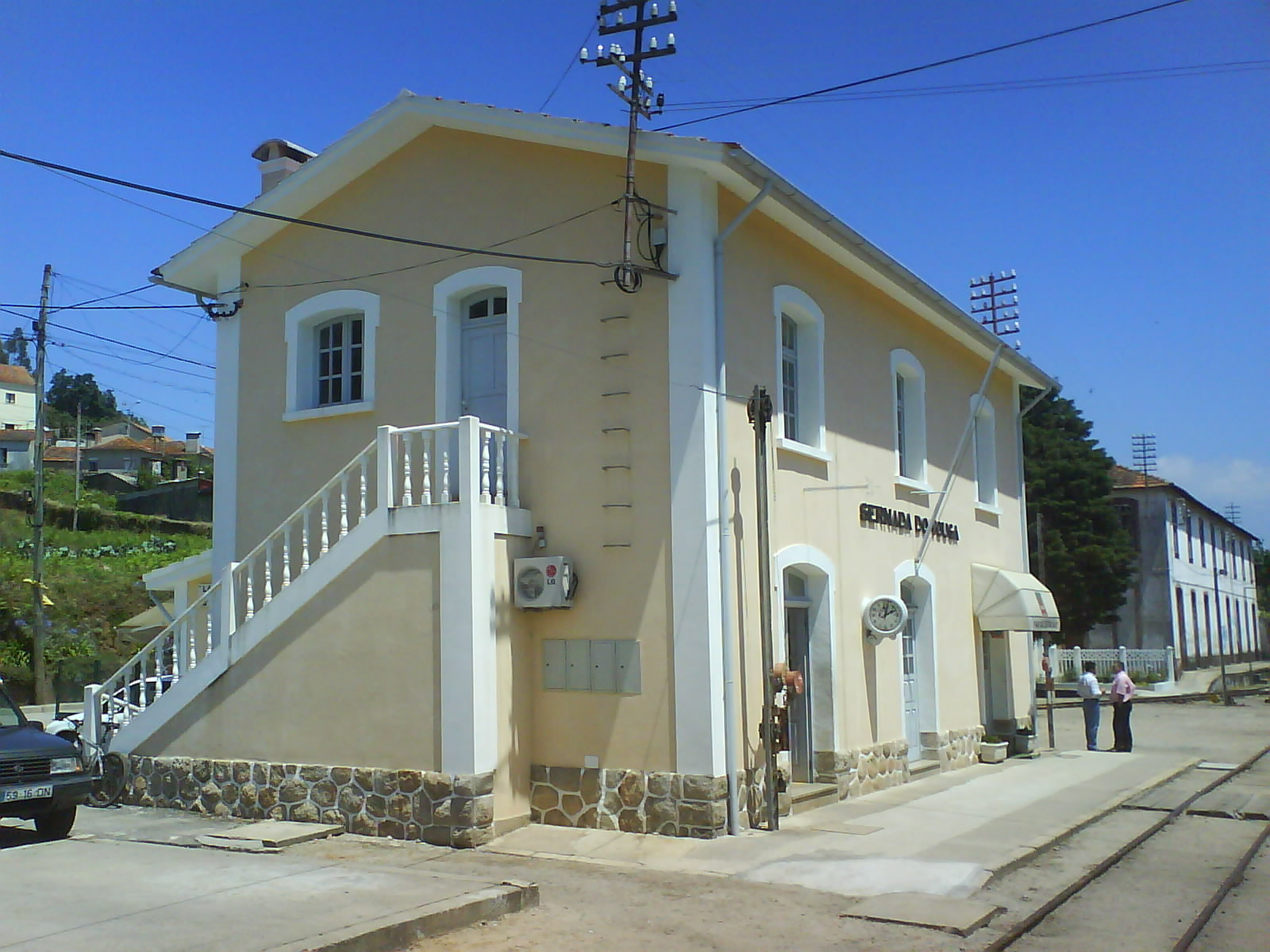
Sernada do Vouga railway station

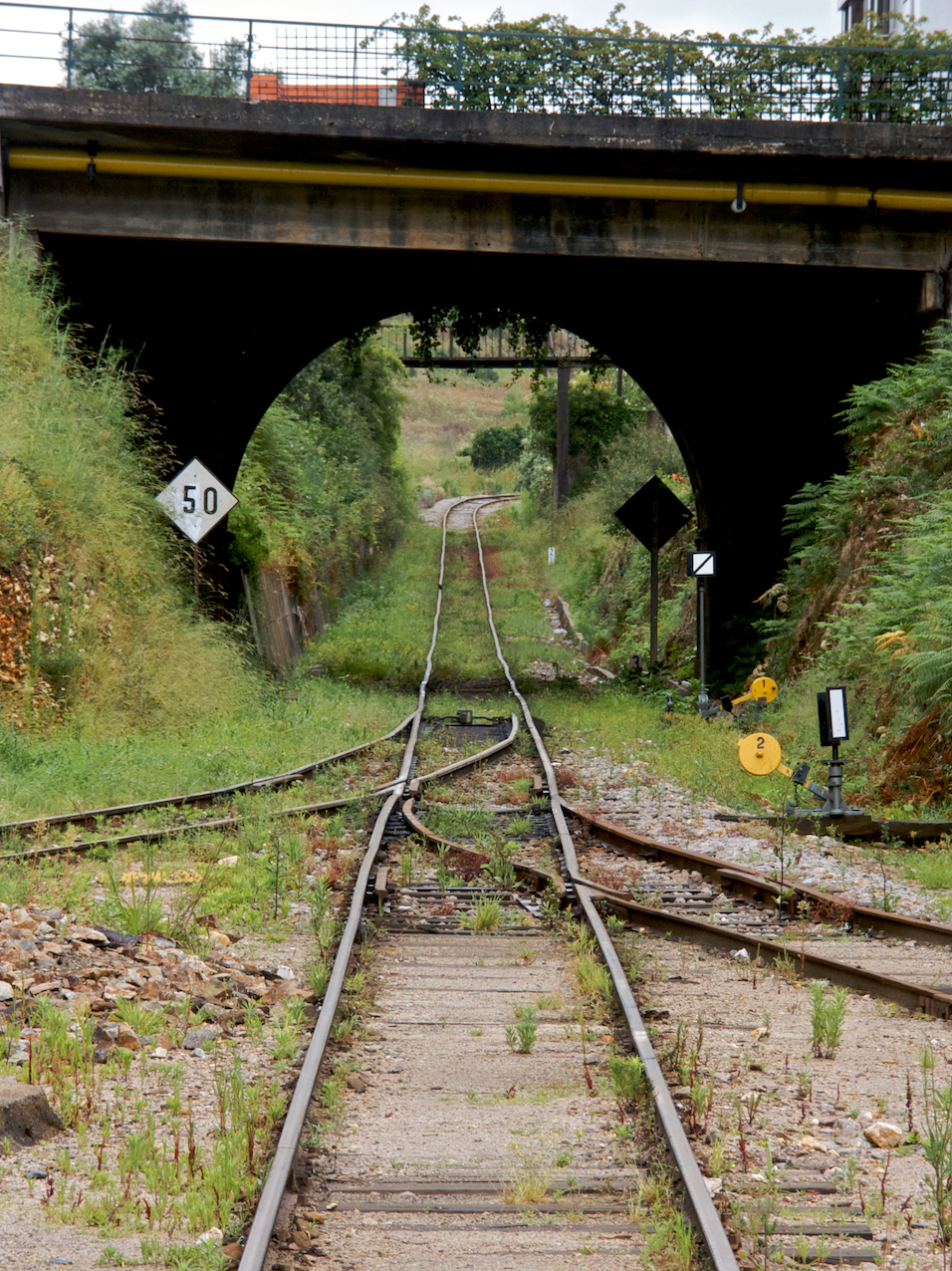
The Vouga line at Aveiro, June 2008

== History ==
After the line was opened by Manuel II of Portugal in 1908, the Companhia do Vale do Vouga operated it from 1907 to 1946. The first section, between Espinho and Oliveira de Azeméis, opened to traffic on 21 December 1908; the next section to be completed was between Ul and Albergaria-a-Velha. The line between this location and Macinhata Vouga, and the Aveiro extension, opened on 8 September 1911. The remainder of the line opened in 1913.

On 30 December 1946, it was nationalised and taken over by the CP.

In the 2016 timetable, the section of line between Sernada do Vouga and Oliveira de Azeméis was served by rail replacement taxi running twice daily. This is still the situation in 2024 but rehabilitation works are ongoing. Some repair and rehabilitation work has been undertaken on the section between Aveiro and Sernada da Vouga. More trains now run along that section, with seven of the ten daily trains covering the whole length. The northern section between Oliveira de Azeméis and Espinho has eight trains each way daily except Sundays and holidays, when there are seven.

== See also ==
- List of railway lines in Portugal
- List of Portuguese locomotives and railcars
- History of rail transport in Portugal
- Narrow gauge railways
- Infraestruturas de Portugal
