= Águeda (freguesia) =

Former civil parish in Portugal

- Civil parish
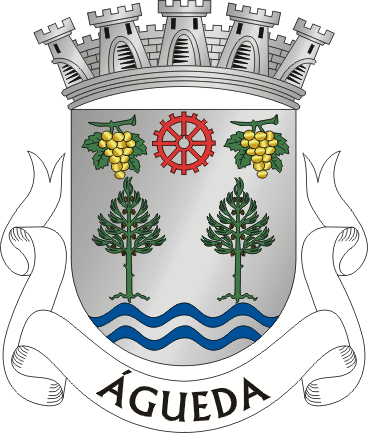
- Coat of arms

- Location in Portugal
- Coordinates: 40°34′00″N 8°27′00″W
- Country: Portugal
- Region: Centro
- Intermunic. comm.: Região de Aveiro
- District: Aveiro
- Municipality: Águeda
- Disbanded: 2013

Area
  - Total: 41.6 km^{2} (16.1 sq mi)

Population (2011)
  - Total: 11,346
  - Density: 273/km^{2} (706/sq mi)
- Time zone: UTC+00:00 (WET)
  - Summer (DST): UTC+01:00 (WEST)

Águeda was a freguesia ("civil parish") in Águeda Municipality, Aveiro District, Portugal. It had an area of 41.6 km2 and in 2011 had a population of 11,346.

== History ==
In 2013 it was merged with Borralha to form the new freguesia of Águeda e Borralha.

== Places ==
- Alagoa
- Alhandra
- Ameal
- Assequins
- Bolfiar
- Catraia de Assequins
- Cavadas
- Giesteira
- Gravanço
- Lapas de S. Pedro
- Maçoida
- Ninho de Águia
- Paredes
- Raivo
- Regote
- Rio Covo
- Sardão
- S. Pedro
- Vale de Erva
- Vale Domingos
- Vale Durão
- Vale Durão
- Vale do Sobreirinho
- Vale Verde

== Demography ==
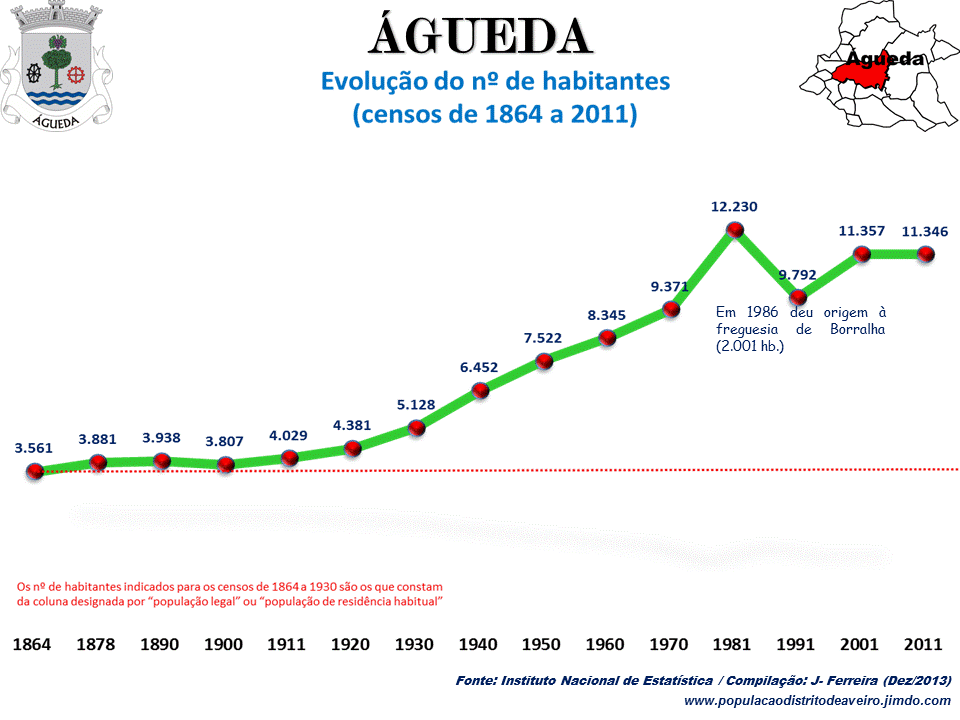
Population from 1864 to 2011

Variation of population from 1864 to 2011

== Politics ==
=== Elections ===
In the 2009 local elections for the Assembly of the Freguesia, there were 10,328 registered voters, with 5,698 (55.17%) voting and 4,630 (44.83%) abstaining. The Socialist Party got 3,039 votes (53.33%), electing eight members of the Assembly, the Social Democratic Party got 1,495 votes (26.24%), electing four members of the Assembly and the Democratic and Social Centre – People's Party got 482 votes (8.46%), electing one member of the Assembly. The three remaining lists did not elect any member of the Assembly. As of 31 December 2011, the freguesia had 10,396 registered voters.

== Religion ==
The Portuguese Roman Catholic Church's Diocese of Aveiro includes the Parish of Águeda as part of the archpriestship of Águeda.

== Built Heritage ==
The Pillory of Assequins, now fragmented, is located in this former freguesia and is classified as an Imóvel de Interesse Público.
