= Águeda e Borralha =

Civil parish in Portugal

- Civil parish
- Location in Portugal
- Coordinates: 40.574°N 8.446°W
- Country: Portugal
- Region: Centro
- Intermunic. comm.: Região de Aveiro
- District: Aveiro
- Municipality: Águeda
- Established: 2013

Area
  - Total: 36.03 km^{2} (13.91 sq mi)

Population (2021)
  - Total: 13,708
  - Density: 380/km^{2} (990/sq mi)
- Time zone: UTC+00:00 (WET)
  - Summer (DST): UTC+01:00 (WEST)

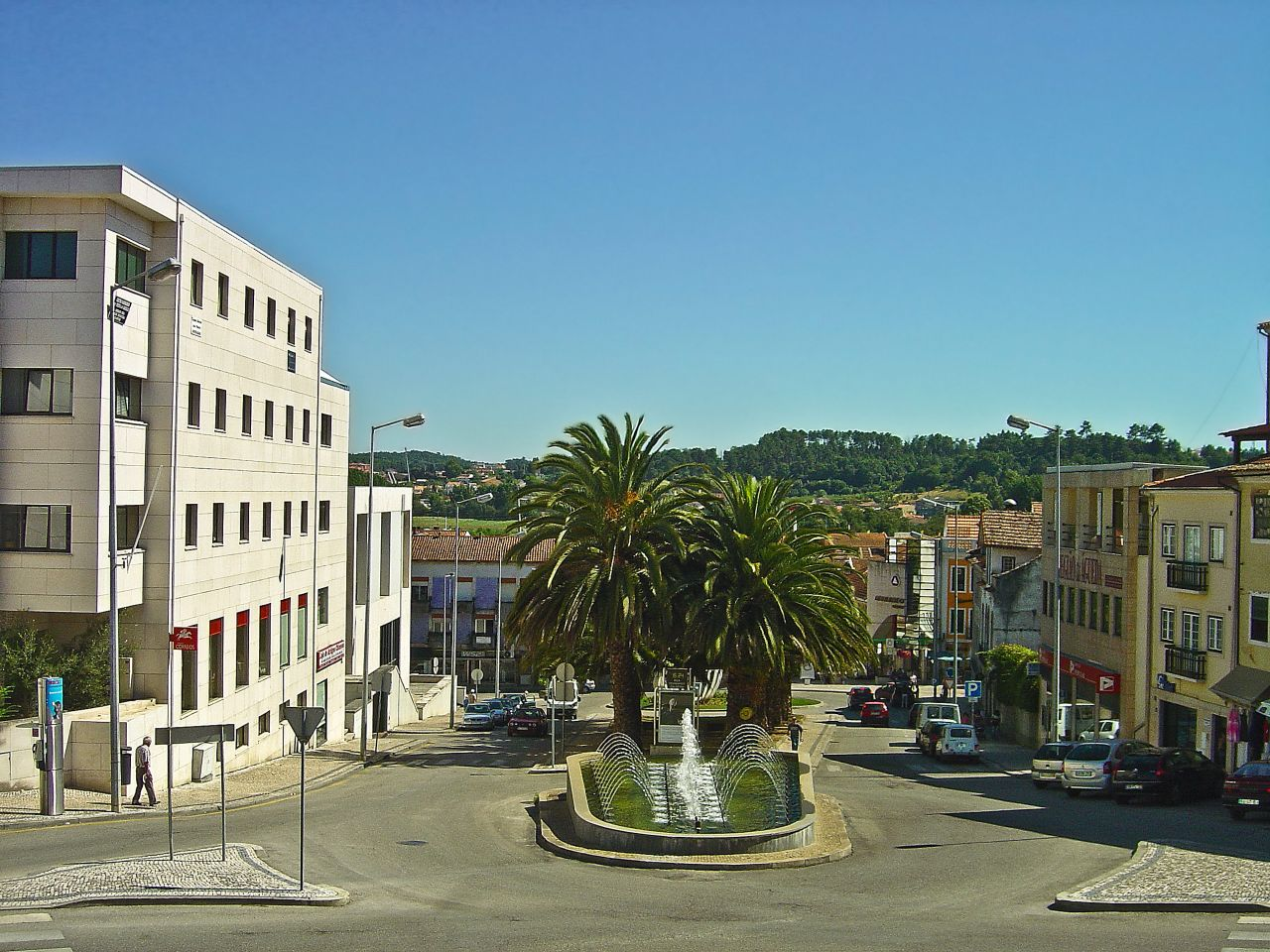
Águeda e Borralha

Águeda e Borralha is a freguesia ("civil parish") in Águeda Municipality, Aveiro District, Portugal. The population in 2011 was 13,576, in an area of 36.03 km^{2}.

== History ==
The freguesia was established in 2013 merging the freguesias of Águeda and Borralha.
