= Church of São Pedro (Belazaima do Chão) =

- Parochial Church of Belazaima do Chão
- Igreja de São Pedro
- Church of São Pedro
- 40°36′39.1″N 8°28′43.1″W
- Location: Aveiro, Baixo Vouga, Centro
- Country: Portugal
- Denomination: Roman Catholic

Architecture
- Style: Medieval

Administration
- Diocese: Diocese de Aveiro

The Church of São Pedro (Portuguese: Igreja Paroquial de Belazaima do Chão/Igreja de São Pedro) is a church in the civil parish of Belazaima do Chão, Castanheira do Vouga e Agadão, in the municipality of Águeda, in the Portuguese Centro district of Aveiro.

== History ==
In 1220, during the Inquiries of King D. Afonso II, references exist for two Belazaimas:

Villam de Alvarim et de balsamia et de alia Balsamia e a quintam de Villarinho e de Ballasayma....

In the August 1485, King D. John II donated the territory to the Infanta D. Joana, where he specified that the villa of Ballasayma with all its royal rights/privileges, rents and tributes, reiterating in 1487 his donation of the estates of Vilarinho and Balezaima.

The church was reconstructed sometime in the 18th century, with the execution of the retables and paintings occurring in the mid-century. These painting in wood are located in the middle of the lateral arches, alongside the collateral arches.

On 21 December 1999, there was a proposal to classify the Church Factory, resulting in the opening of a process by the vice-president of IPPAR (fore-runner of IGESPAR) on 7 February 2000. The DRCoimbra proposed the classification church as an Imóvel de Interesse Público (Property of Public Interest) on 19 August 2002, but the suggestion was revised by DRRCentro on 5 August 2010, to that of Monumento de Interesse Público (Monument of Public Interest). On 13 October 2010, the National Council for Culture solicited a clarification on the classification proposals, that was clarified on 4 November. The seesaw between organizations continued with 2 January 2012 proposal by the DRRCentro to advance with the classification, given a report on the level of conservation. On 25 September, an announcement was published (13458/2012, Diário da República, Série 2, 186) with a decision to classify the church as an Monumento de Interesse Público and establishing a special protection zone.

== Architecture ==
The church is located in an urban area, in between residential buildings, with a paved churchyard, delimited by wall and flanked in the north, west and south. Access to the churchyard is to the right, fenced-in by a grade and gate in iron, while to the northwest is an uncharacteristic two-story annex building for catechism. To the east is a pillory with Latin cross with three orders of plinths over rectangular base. On the southern flank, is the building of the social centre, east by the Rua da Igreja and agricultural pastures, and north by another building, followed 10 metres (33 ft) away by the Junta de Freguesia.
