= Mario Galhano =

Portuguese footballer (born 1982)

Personal information
- Full name: Mario Leandro Silva Galhano
- Date of birth: 4 August 1982 (age 44)
- Place of birth: Águeda, Portugal
- Position: Defender

Team information
- Current team: Feirense

Senior career*
| Years | Team | Apps | (Gls) |
| 2001– | Feirense | 126 | (0) |
- * Club domestic league appearances and goals

Mario Leandro Silva Galhano (born 4 August 1982) is a Portuguese footballer currently playing in the Liga de Honra club Feirense as a defender wearing the number 3 shirt. He has been at the club since 2001 where he was a successful youth product and went through the ranks to the first team where he is the current team captain and one of the key players in the squad.
