= Macinhata do Vouga =

Civil parish in Portugal

- Civil parish
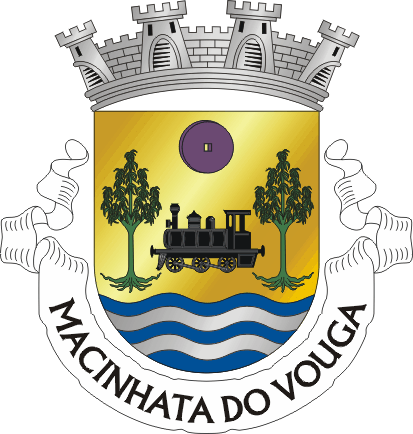
- Coat of arms

- Location in Portugal
- Coordinates: 40.652°N 8.458°W
- Country: Portugal
- Region: Centro
- Intermunic. comm.: Região de Aveiro
- District: Aveiro
- Municipality: Águeda

Area
  - Total: 31.95 km^{2} (12.34 sq mi)

Population (2011)
  - Total: 3,406
  - Density: 110/km^{2} (280/sq mi)
- Time zone: UTC+00:00 (WET)
  - Summer (DST): UTC+01:00 (WEST)
- Postal code: 3750

Macinhata do Vouga is a Portuguese parish, located in the municipality of Águeda, Aveiro District. The population in 2011 was 3,406, in an area of 31.95 km^{2}.

== Villages ==
- Macinhata do Vouga
- Jafafe de Baixo
- Jafafe de Cima
- Sernada do Vouga
- Carvoeiro
- Cavada Nova
- Serém de Baixo
- Serém de Cima
- Lameiro
- Pontilhão
- Mesa do Vouga
- Carvalhal da Portela (parte)
- Cavadas de Cima
- Macida
- Beco
- Soutelo
- Chãs
- Mata do Carvoeiro
- Alombada
- Moita
- Arrôta da Moita
- Carvalhal
- Cova
- Póvoa
