= Sernada do Vouga =

Coordinates: 40°40′20.7″N 8°27′11″W

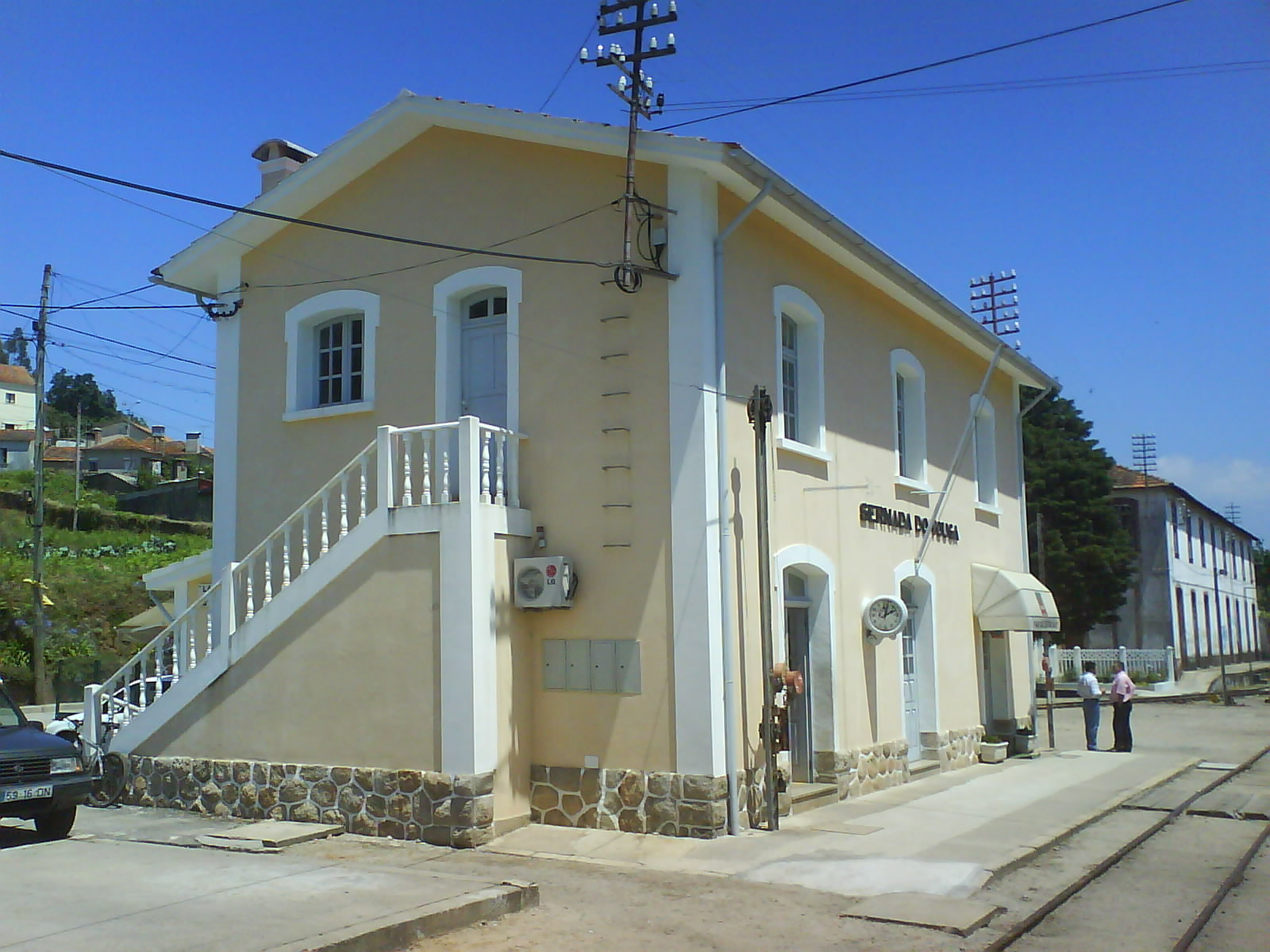
Rail Station of Sernada do Vouga

Sernada do Vouga is a small Portuguese village in the parish of Macinhata do Vouga, in Águeda Municipality in Aveiro District.

It is located a few meters downstream of the estuary of the Caima River and is surrounded by the Vouga River. Since the beginning of the 20th century, it has been a centre for railroad activity, through the construction of Linha do Vale do Vouga and its location at the junction of the three 'legs' of the route, i.e. Espinho, Aveiro and Viseu. With the closure, in January 1990, of the link Sernada - Viseu, it lost part of its role but it retains the EMEF workshop for the Vouga line's rolling stock. The Vouga Line is now Portugal's only active narrow-gauge railway and is under threat of closure.

== To see ==
Fluvial beach, the area of sport fishing, the railway station, the dedicated chapel to Sait Amaro, and the primary school. Some fountains are also interest, detaching that is found in main square. As curiosity, they are the bridges: on the river Vouga, with special characteristic the fact that is for mixed traffic (sharing in the same level the rail and road traffic, having barriers that cut the road traffic when trains are using the bridge); and on the river Caima (reconverted bridge from rail traffic to road traffic).

== See also ==
- Linha do Vouga
