= O Diário =

O Diário was a Portuguese communist newspaper, that existed between 1976 and 1990.
