= CP Class 9630 =

Portuguese diesel multiple unit

Série 9630
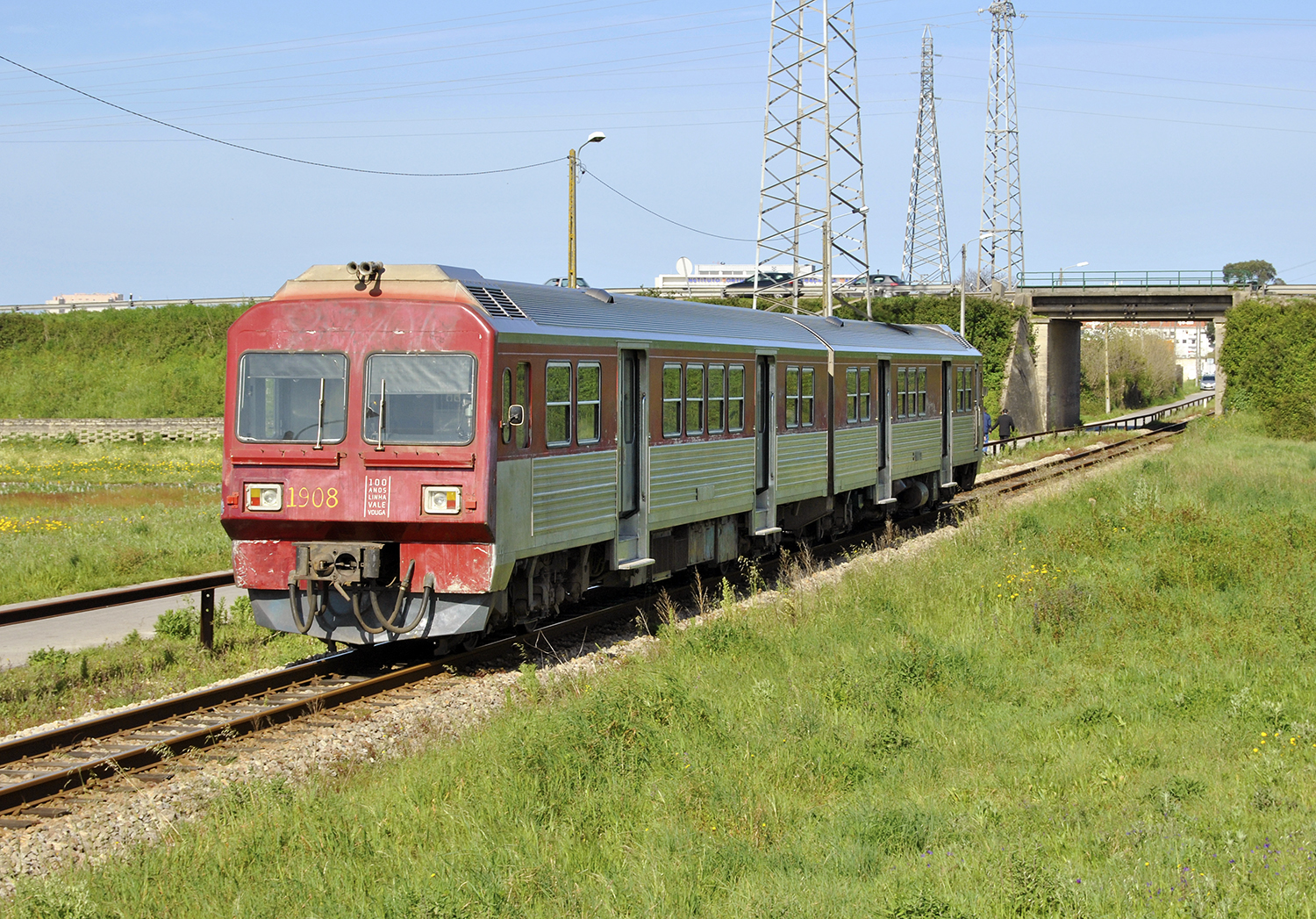
- CP 9637

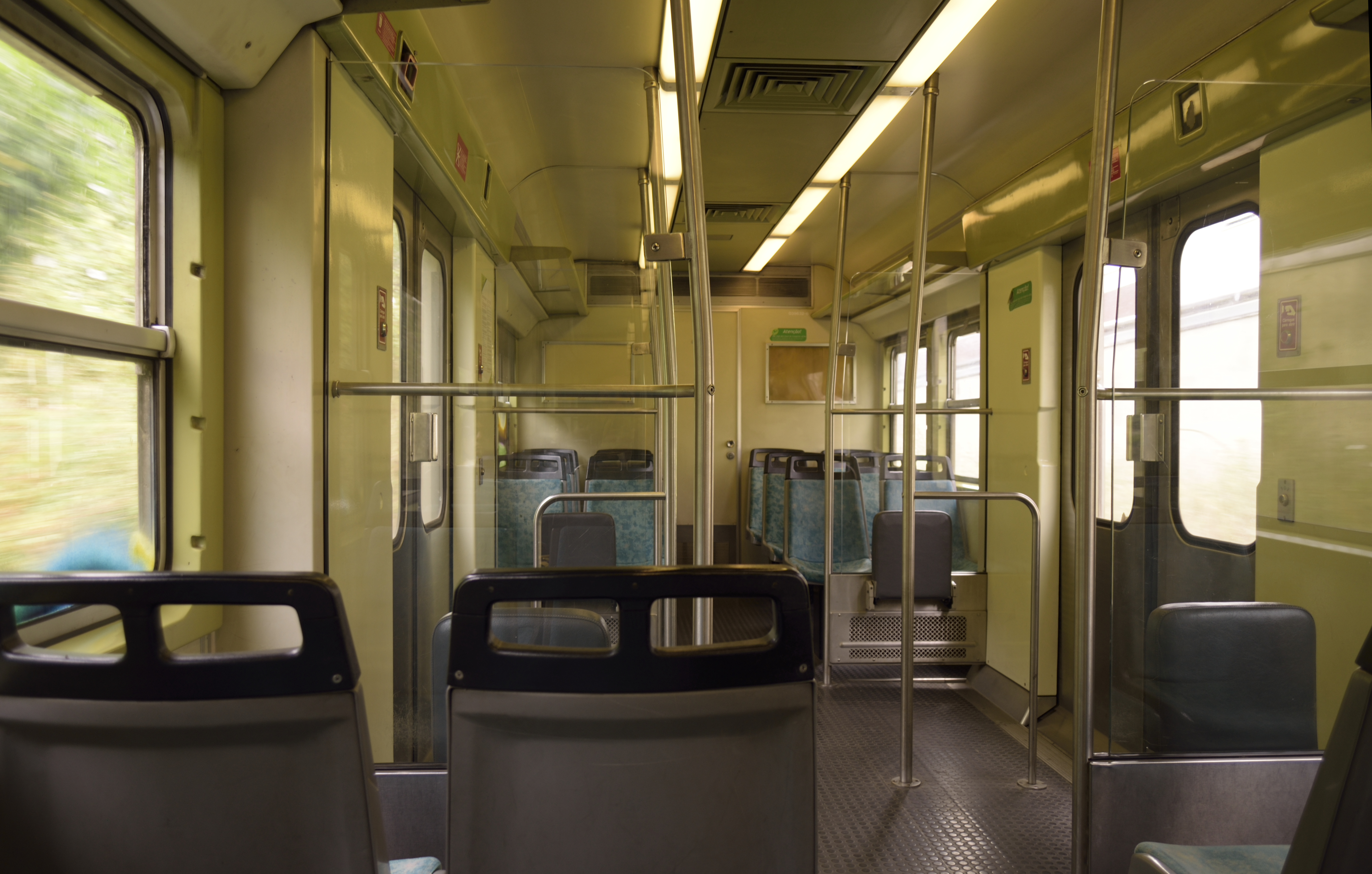
- Interior
- Manufacturer: Sorefame
- Entered service: 1991
- Number built: 7
- Fleet numbers: 9631–9637
- Capacity: 267
- Operators: Comboios de Portugal
- Lines served: Vouga

Specifications
- Train length: 38,550 mm (126 ft 5 3/4 in)
- Car length: 19,275 mm (63 ft 2 7/8 in)
- Width: 3,280 mm (10 ft 9 1/8 in)
- Height: 4,690 mm (15 ft 4 5/8 in)
- Floor height: 1,020 mm (3 ft 4 1/8 in)
- Doors: Electro-pneumatic, 4 doors each side
- Wheel diameter: 880 mm (34.65 in)
- Maximum speed: 90 km/h (56 mph)
- Prime mover(s): 2 x Saurer SDHR 1
- Engine type: (?)
- Cylinder count: 6
- Power output: 525 CV (518 hp; 386 kW)
- Transmission: Electric
- Braking system(s): Electro-pneumatic
- Track gauge: 1,000 mm (3 ft 3 3/8 in) metre gauge

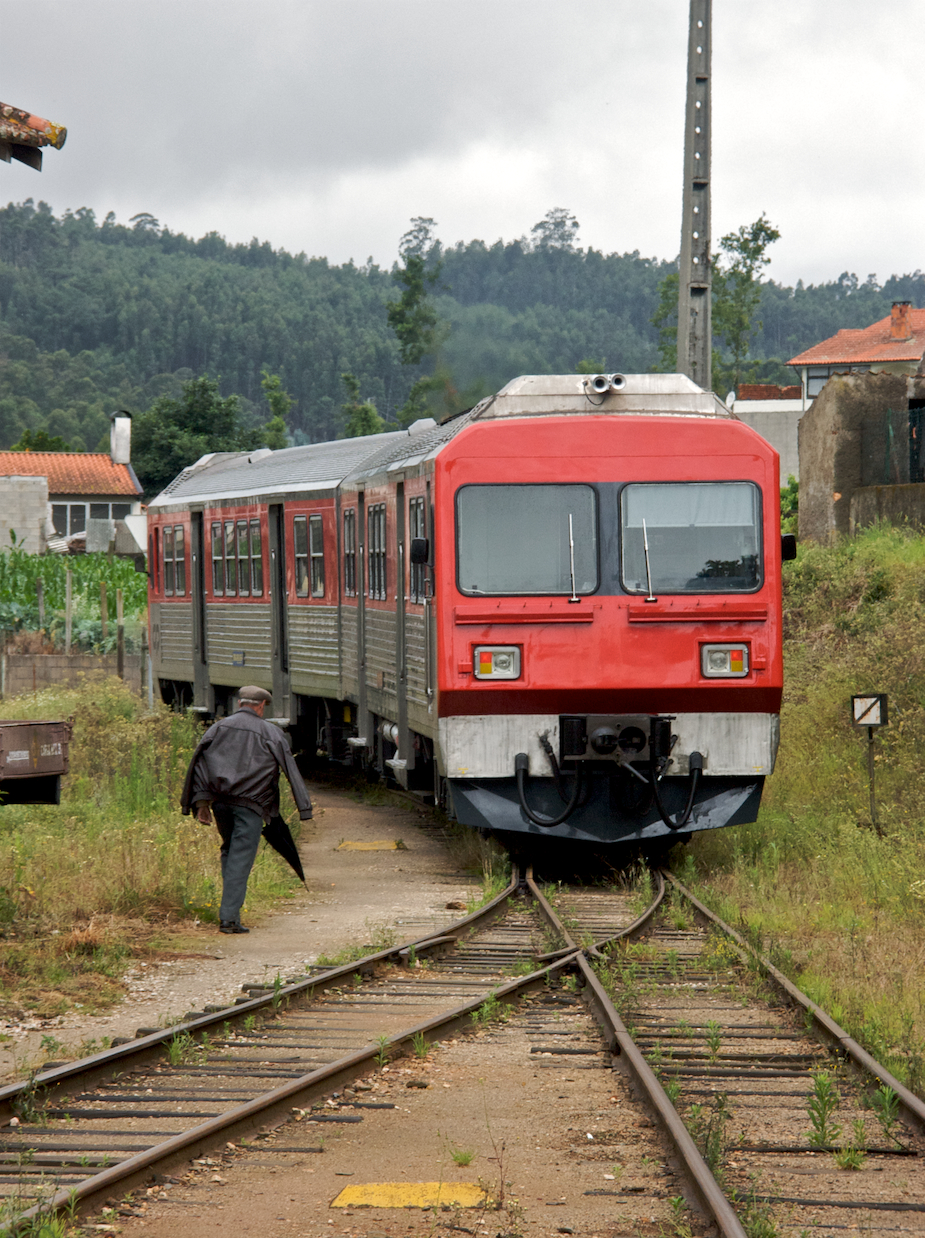
A Série 9630 at Macinhata do Vouga station, June 2008

The Série 9630 are a class of diesel multiple unit trains built for the metre gauge lines of Portuguese Railways (CP) in the Porto area. The trains were built in Portugal by Sorefame and entered service in 1991.

These trains were specifically built for and initially used on local train services from Trindade station in Porto. Built with diesel-electric transmission, they were designed for easy conversion to electric multiple units. Instead of electrifying the Porto-area 1,000 mm (3 ft 3 3/8 in) metre gauge lines, it was decided to extensively modernise the system and rebuilt the network completely as part of the Porto Metro (which has been built to 1,435 mm / 4 ft 8 1/2 in standard gauge). The closure of these metre gauge lines in 2002 for modernisation left the Série 9630 (and the older Série 9600) units redundant.

Seven two-carriage units of Série 9630 were transferred to the Vouga line, where (as of August 2024) they remain in service. Since 2009 the Vouga line has been CP's only remaining metre gauge line. This line is, however, also threatened with closure; such a closure would render the Série 9630 units redundant for a second time.

== See also ==
- Narrow gauge railways in Portugal
