= Vicente Grez =

Chilean politician, journalist and writer (1847–1909)

Vicente Grez Yávar (21 January 1847 – 1 June 1909 (Note: According to his biography on the website of the Library of the National Congress of Chile, Grez was born 21 January 1842 and died 28 May 1909.)) was a Chilean politician, journalist, and writer.

== Family and education ==
Vicente Grez Yávar was born in Santiago in 1847, the son of Manuel Grez and Manuela Yávar.

He studied humanities at the National Institute after some elementary courses at San Luis College. He entered law school, but his literary interests led him to drop out.

He married Mercedes Mulet on 4 February 1867 at the Parroquia El Sagrario. They had one son.

== Journalistic and literary career ==
Grez began his work in journalism in 1868 as editor of El Charivari, a satirical political publication. He also collaborated, under various pseudonyms, on publications such as La Linterna del Diablo, with caustic verses lampooning public figures.

These early activities as a journalist shaped the rest of his life, leading to jobs as editor and publisher of the newspapers El Heraldo, La Época, La República, La Campana, La Patria (of which he was director from 1893 to 1894), La Opinión, and El Mercurio, and the magazines La Revista de Santiago, Sud-América, Las Veladas Literarias, Las Novedades, El Nuevo Ferrocarril, Los Debates, Los Lunes, El Salín and Revista de Artes y Letras.

In his first books he displayed an interest in publicizing the history of Chile. His novel Las mujeres de la Independencia (1878) formed a portrait of several important Chilean women of the early 19th century. La vida santiaguina (1879) characterized some aspects of 17th century Chilean society. El combate homérico (1880) narrated the events of the naval Battle of Iquique. In 1882 he released Ráfagas, a collection of short poems which had previously been published in El Heraldo. His later novels Emilia Reynals (1883), La dote de una joven (1884), Marianita (1881), and El ideal de una esposa (1887) were very well received by the reading public and were compared with the works of Alberto Blest Gana. Pages of his unpublished novel Jenio sin alas were published in La Revista Nueva in 1900.

He was also an art critic, founding the Revista de Bellas Artes (1889–1890) and serving as secretary of the organizing committee of Chile's presentation at the 1889 Exposition Universelle in Paris. At this time he wrote the book Les beaux arts au Chili. Grez's work culminated with his particular vision of the era and of nortino territory, Viaje de destierro (1893).

== Political and public career ==
Grez was a member of the National or Montt-Varist Party.

In 1875, he became head of the Foreign Section of Correos de Chile, and in 1888 took over as head of the National Statistics Institute, a position he held until his death in 1909.

He was alternate deputy for Arauco from 1882 to 1885, and for Taltal from 1885 to 1888. Later he took over as primary deputy for Taltal, from 1888 to 1891. He was second vice president of the Chamber of Deputies from 16 January 1890 to the dissolution of the National Congress in 1891. He was one of the signatories of the deposition of President José Manuel Balmaceda in 1891. He was exiled to Peru and returned to Chile in 1893.

== Works ==
- Las mujeres de la independencia (1878)
- La vida santiaguina (1879)
- El combate homérico (1880)
- Antonio Smith (1881)
- Marianita (1881)
- Ráfagas (1882)
- Emilia Reynalds (1883)
- La dote de una joven (1884)
- El ideal de una esposa (1887)
- Viaje de destierro (1893)
