= Valongo do Vouga =

Civil parish in Portugal

- Civil parish
- Location in Portugal
- Coordinates: 40.629°N 8.439°W
- Country: Portugal
- Region: Centro
- Intermunic. comm.: Região de Aveiro
- District: Aveiro
- Municipality: Águeda

Area
  - Total: 43.20 km^{2} (16.68 sq mi)

Population (2011)
  - Total: 4,877
  - Density: 112.9/km^{2} (292.4/sq mi)
- Time zone: UTC+00:00 (WET)
  - Summer (DST): UTC+01:00 (WEST)
- Website: www.jf-valongodovouga.pt

Valongo do Vouga is a freguesia in Águeda Municipality, Aveiro District, Portugal. The population in 2011 was 4,877, in an area of 43.20 km^{2}.

== Geography ==
=== Places ===
- Aguieira
- Aldeia
- Arrancada do Vouga
- Brunhido
- Cadaveira
- Carvalhal da Portela
- Carvalhosa
- Cavadas da Baixo
- Cavadinhas
- Espinheiros
- Fermentões
- Gândara
- Lanheses
- Lavagadas
- Moutedo
- Outeiro
- Paço
- Picadas
- Póvoa do Espírito Santo
- Quintã
- Redonda
- Sabugal
- Salgueiro
- Sobreiro
- Toural
- Val Covo
- Veiga
- Valongo

== Demography ==
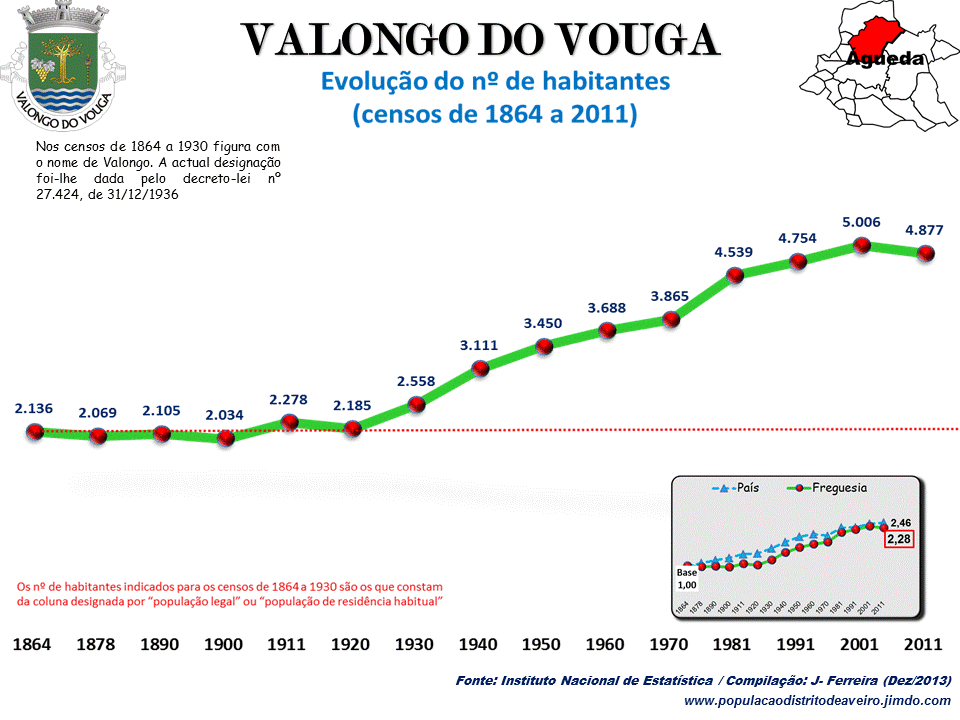
Population from 1864 to 2011

Population variation from 1864 to 2011

== Elections ==
As of 31 December 2011, it had 4,461 registered voters.
