= Agueda Esteban =

- Born: 5 February 1868; Binondo, Manila, Captaincy General of the Philippines
- Died: September 1944 (aged 76)
- Occupation: Point person of the Katipunero

Agueda Esteban y de la Cruz (5 February 1868 – September 1944) was a Filipina revolutionary. She worked for Katipunero fighters and brought materials from Manila to make gunpowder and bullets, which she delivered to her husband in Cavite. Upon the death of her first husband, Mariano Barroga of Batac, she married Gen. Artemio Ricarte.

== Early life ==
Born in Binondo, Manila, she was the second child of Ambrosio Esteban, a native of Ligao and Francisca de la Cruz of Cainta, Rizal. Her parents moved to Binondo after their marriage. In Binondo, Agueda and her brother and sister were taught by "Maestrang Bulag" who was selling ikmo leaves and tobacco. Coming from an impoverished family, she enrolled in a girls' school under the auspices of Dona Vicenta de Roxas. She excelled at school, which earned her the respect of her teacher, parents and most importantly, Dona Vicenta.

She married Mariano Barroga of Batac, Ilocos Norte who was the mayordomo in the house of the son of Dona Vicenta. They had three children, Catalina, Adriana and Anastacia.

== Katipunan ==
Her husband joined the Katipunan and assumed the pseudonym Tungkod (Tagalog for "rod" or "staff"). He was put in charge of the revolutionaries in San Juan del Monte, Montalban and Marikina. Later, he was transferred with his family from Manila to Tangos, Cavite.

Agueda helped her husband in his revolutionary activities. They travelled between Manila and Cavite in order to secure materials for ammunition to be used by the Filipinos. Their activities remained undetected by the authorities until the first phase of the revolution ended with the Truce of Biak-na-Bato.

== American invasion ==
During the American occupation of the Philippines, she was the courier between her husband in Manila and General Artemio Ricarte in Cavite. She was entrusted with secret papers on war strategies and planned attacks on the Spanish detachments. Because she was a woman, she was never suspected of involvement in revolutionary activities.

On 1 July 1900, all three were arrested in Calle Anda after the authorities discovered grenades in her house. On 16 February 1901, Tungkod (then a Lt. Col.) was exiled to Guam with other revolutionaries. Aguada was left behind to take care of her four children. She left her three older children in the care of Hospicio de San Jose, while she sold jewellery with her youngest child Salud, to support her family. In November 1902, her husband died; leaving her with another child named Artemio in honour of Artemio Ricarte.

== Exile and later life ==
In 1910, she visited Gen. Ricarte who was in Hong Kong exiled for the second time after refusing to sign an oath of allegiance to the United States. In May 1911, she married the general and lived there from 1910 to 1921 on the small island of Lemah.

When the British government deported political exiles from Hong Kong during the outbreak of World War I, her family was shipped to Shanghai and then Japan. In 1921, they moved to Tokyo, where Gen. Ricarte taught Spanish in an overseas school. In April 1923 they transferred to Yokohama, where they lived permanently and opened a profitable restaurant. They lived there for eighteen years together with their children and grandchildren.

After Japan occupied the Philippines, she came back. In 1944, she fell ill and died.
