= Barrô e Aguada de Baixo =

Civil parish in Portugal

- Civil parish
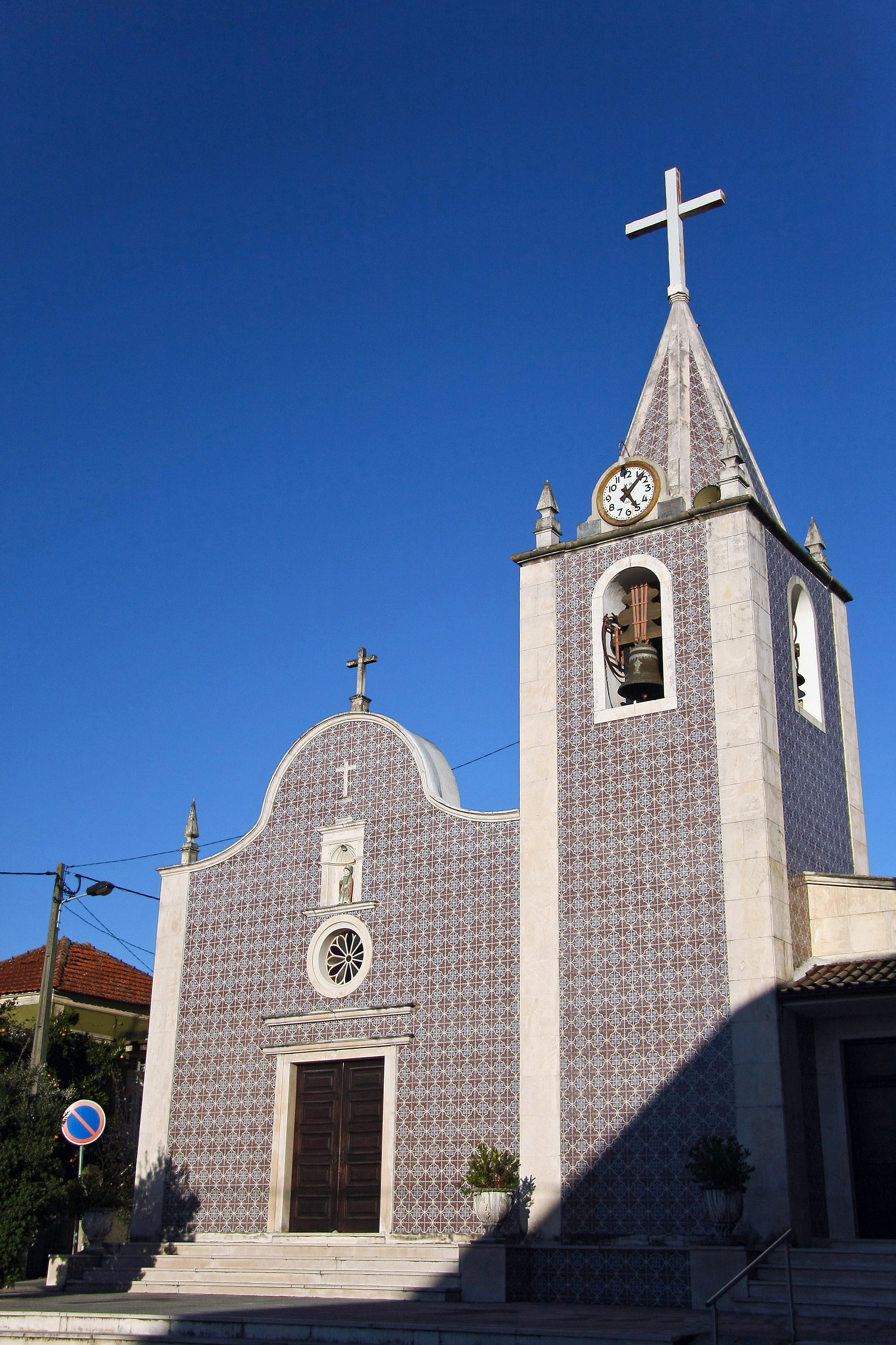
- Aguada de Baixo - Portugal

- Location in Portugal
- Coordinates: 40.509°N 8.452°W
- Country: Portugal
- Region: Centro
- Intermunic. comm.: Região de Aveiro
- District: Aveiro
- Municipality: Águeda
- Established: 2013
- Disbanded: 2025

Area
  - Total: 10.19 km^{2} (3.93 sq mi)

Population (2021)
  - Total: 3,086
  - Density: 302.8/km^{2} (784.4/sq mi)
- Time zone: UTC+00:00 (WET)
  - Summer (DST): UTC+01:00 (WEST)

Barrô e Aguada de Baixo was a freguesia ("civil parish") in Águeda Municipality, Aveiro District, Portugal. The population in 2011 was 3,209, in an area of 10.19 km^{2}. It was disbanded in 2025.

== History ==
The freguesia was established in 2013. It was disbanded in 2025.
