= Aguada de Cima =

Civil parish in Portugal

- Civil parish
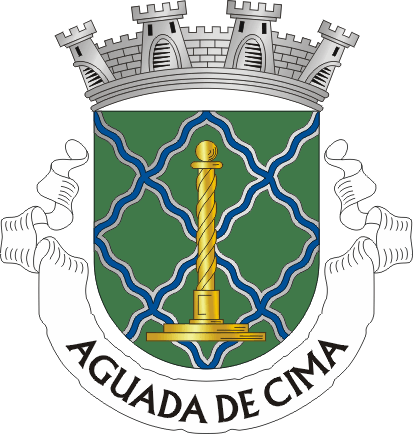
- Coat of arms

- Location in Portugal
- Coordinates: 40.519°N 8.426°W
- Country: Portugal
- Region: Centro
- Intermunic. comm.: Região de Aveiro
- District: Aveiro
- Municipality: Águeda

Area
  - Total: 28.39 km^{2} (10.96 sq mi)

Population (2011)
  - Total: 4,013
  - Density: 140/km^{2} (370/sq mi)
- Time zone: UTC+00:00 (WET)
  - Summer (DST): UTC+01:00 (WEST)
- Postal code: 3750
- Patron: Saint Eulalia
- Website: http://www.jf-aguadadecima.pt/

Aguada de Cima is a civil parish in the Centro Region municipality of Águeda, in Portugal. The population in 2011 was 4,013, in an area of 28.39 km^{2}.

It contains the localities Aguadalte, Almas da Areosa, Bustelo, Cabeço Grande, Cabeço da Igreja, Cabeço de Lama, Cadaval, Canavai, Carvalhitos, Corsa, Engenho, Forcada, Formigueiro, Forno, Garrido, Ilha, Ínsua, Miragaia, Monte Verde, Pisão, Pisão da Forcada, Outeiro, Povoa de Baixo, Povoa de S. Domingos, Povoa do Teso, Povoa de Vale Trigo, S. Martinho, Seixo, Teso, Vale Grande, Vale do Lobo and Vila.

== History ==
Aguada de Cima was a Roman outpost in or about 350 BC.

It was first mentioned in 132 A.D., as Aqualata. It was also mentioned under donation papers referring to the Monastery of Larvão, in 961, when the name of its patron saint (Saint Eulalia) was first indicated. It was later occupied by the monks of the Monastery of Vacarica during the Middle Ages, when they oversaw the agricultural development of the otherwise undisturbed lands in the Aguada De Cima basin.

In 1064, and under pressure, it was given to Dom Sesnando, in the Church of Milreu, in Coimbra, in 1113.

It was later passed onto the Portuguese Crown in 1128. In 1132, Afonso Henriques courted the town to the Cathedral of Coimbra, and was later transferred to the title of the University of Coimbra, where it held a special jurisdiction within the justice system. A foral was conceded on 23 August 1514, during the reign of Manuel I of Portugal, where it was the seat of the Captaincy of the region.

During the Liberal regime, it was under the protection/administration of the Dukes of Lafões, where it served as a region centre with pillory, gallows and court. Aguada de Cima was the municipal seat of its own municipality until 1834, the year in which it was disincorporated and merged into the municipality of Águeda. But, following the administrative reforms of 1835, it was reintegrated from 17 July 1835 until 31 December 1836, when it was finally extinct.

On 12 July 1997 it was elevated to the status of vila (town), and a replica of its historical pillory was installed on 12 July 2007.
