= Belazaima do Chão, Castanheira do Vouga e Agadão =

Civil parish in Portugal

- Civil parish
- Location in Portugal
- Coordinates: 40.583°N 8.360°W
- Country: Portugal
- Region: Centro
- Intermunic. comm.: Região de Aveiro
- District: Aveiro
- Municipality: Águeda
- Established: 2013

Area
  - Total: 88.09 km^{2} (34.01 sq mi)

Population (2021)
  - Total: 1,418
  - Density: 16/km^{2} (42/sq mi)
- Time zone: UTC+00:00 (WET)
  - Summer (DST): UTC+01:00 (WEST)

Belazaima do Chão, Castanheira do Vouga e Agadão is a freguesia in Águeda Municipality, Aveiro District, Portugal. The population in 2011 was 1,611, in an area of 88.09 km^{2}.

== History ==
The freguesia was established in 2013.
