= Águeda =

- Municipality
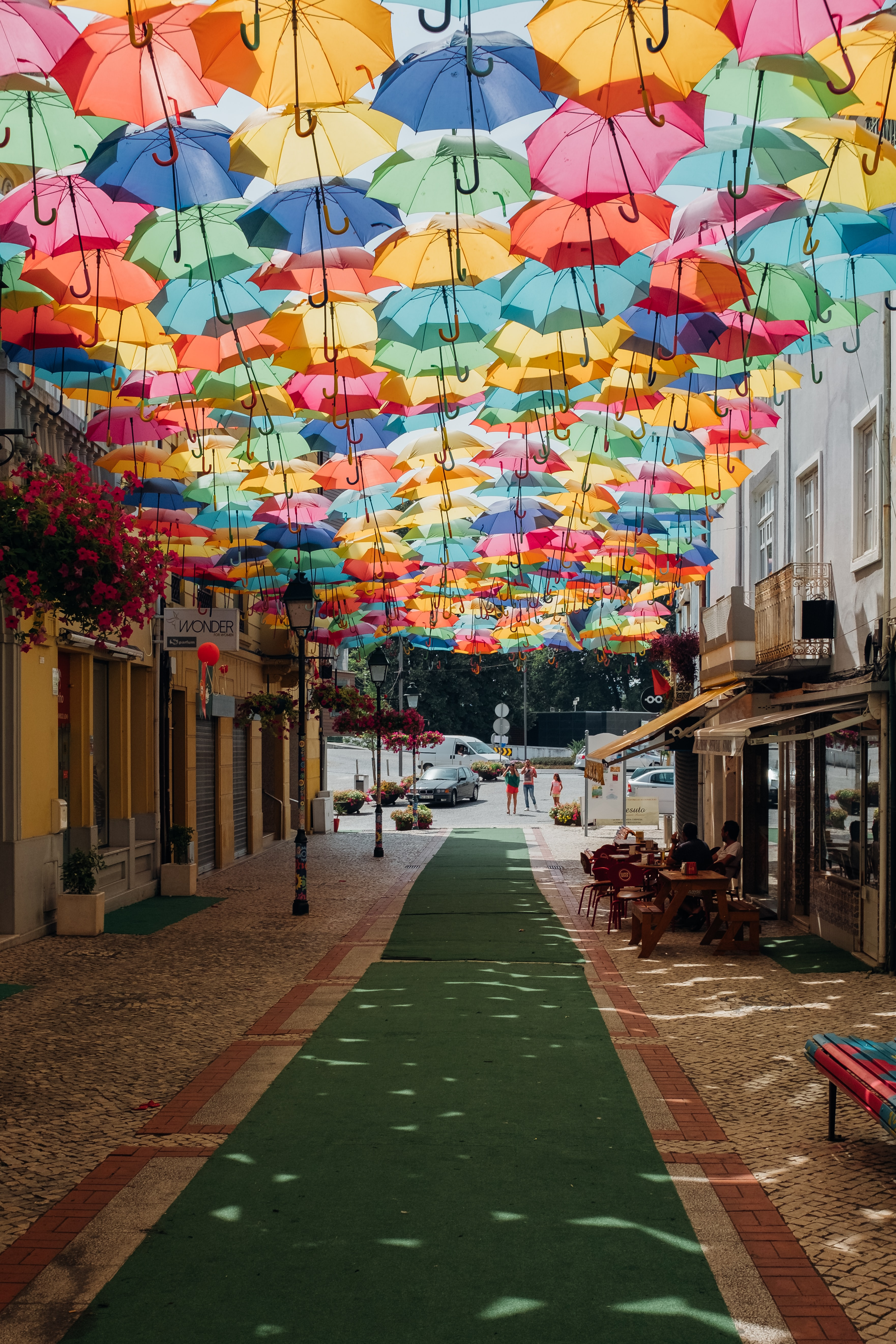
- Luís de Camões Street, Águeda

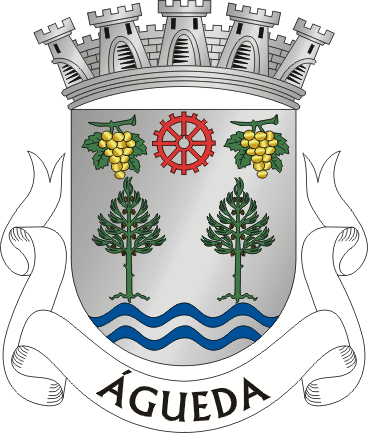
- Flag Coat of arms
- Interactive map of Águeda
- Coordinates: 40°34′28″N 8°26′53″W
- Country: Portugal
- Region: Centro
- Intermunic. comm.: Região de Aveiro
- District: Aveiro
- Parishes: 11

Government
  - President: Jorge Almeida PPD/PSD.MPT

Area
  - Total: 335.27 km^{2} (129.45 sq mi)

Population (2021)
  - Total: 46,131
  - Density: 137.59/km^{2} (356.37/sq mi)
- Time zone: UTC+00:00 (WET)
  - Summer (DST): UTC+01:00 (WEST)
- Postal code: 3750
- Area code: 234
- Patron: Saint Eulalia
- Website: www.cm-agueda.pt

Águeda (pronounced [ˈaɣɨðɐ]) is a city and a municipality in Portugal. According to the Portuguese 2011 census, the municipality of Águeda had 47,729 inhabitants, in an area of 335.27 km^{2} (129.45 sq mi). The city proper had a population of 14,504 (2001 data), while the remainder is distributed in 11 parishes, within the Baixo Vouga Subregion.

== History ==
Águeda has been a municipal seat since 1834 and has had official city status since 1985. It was built on a foundation of successive Celt, Turduli and Lusitanian inhabitants since 370 BC.

Ancient occupation of this area dates back to the Bronze Age, marked by diverse megalithic monuments, including the archaeological site at Cabeço do Vouga, an important Roman military fortification along routes from Olissipo (Lisbon) to Bracara Augusta (Braga).

In the 9th century, Águeda was a prosperous borough, with stable commerce and an active port that supported local and regional businesses. It was mentioned in documents from 1050 to 1077, by its primitive name Casal Lousado (Latin: Casāle Lausātum), or by its anglicized forms: Anegia, Agatha and Ágada; by the 9th century, this settlement was referred to as Ágata. In a document dated 1050, there is mention of several villages situated within the current borders, many with names originating from Arab languages.

Águeda never achieved a foral during the Middle Ages, in contrast to its neighbors, it was considered regal lands and dominions of the monasteries of Lorvão and Vacariça. It functioned as an ancillary center on the road to Santiago de Compostela, and the river-side village was most certainly visited by Queen Isabel (S. Elizabeth of Portugal) in 1325, during her customary pilgrimages to the religious center.

A new phase of settlement occurred after the establishment of the Kingdom of Portugal, from the 11th–12th century: although its inhabitants prospered, and had many privileges, their representatives from Aveiro in the Cortes of Évora (1451), never requested a foral declaration. King D. Manuel I included Águeda in a general foral granted to Aveiro, in 1515, but was only, later, provided a separate charter.

In 1834, Águeda ascended to the category of municipal seat, as a consequence of the Portuguese Liberal Revolution, when major administrative reforms were initiated. Its important political place and strategic politico-military position allowed Águeda to support military troops during the second French Invasion, when it functioned as military hospital. Resulting from the administrative reform, Águeda began its political career in the shadow of great change, and many of its citizens were important land reformers. The municipality of Águeda was established on 31 December 1853, and integrated many older concelhos of medieval origins long since extinct, including Aguada de Cima, Castanheira do Vouga and Préstimo.

As a frontier city located between the sea and land, it occupies a privileged position, serviced by both railroads and an expanding road network. These advancements allowed the economic and social development of the region and placed Águeda in an important position, resulting in its growth and development. On 14 August 1985, Águeda was elevated to the category of city by law.

== Geography ==
The municipality of Águeda is administratively integrated into the district of Aveiro, in the former region of Beira Litoral; it is located 240 kilometres (149 miles) from Lisbon, 72 kilometres (45 miles) from Porto and 20 kilometres (12 miles) from Aveiro.

=== Physical geography ===
It is situated in the hydrographic basin of the River Vouga, limited in the north by the Vouga, the south by the river Cértima, to the east by the Serra do Caramulo (Caramulo mountains) and west by the lowlands of the Ria de Aveiro. These frontiers establish Águeda in a central position, in a transition zone between the coastal zones and interior, thus affording the municipality with various socio-economic advantages. In addition to the mentioned rivers, the area is also delimited by the River Marnel, and the tributaries of the River Águeda: the River Alfusqueiro, Agadão and Dornes ravine.

==== Ecoregions/Protected zones ====
The Pateira de Fermentelos, shortly known as Pateira, is a natural lake located within the triangle of the municipalities of Águeda, Aveiro and Oliveira do Bairro, before the confluence of the Cértima and Águeda rivers. It is the largest natural lake in the Iberian peninsula, rich in diverse species of bird, fish and aquatic plants.

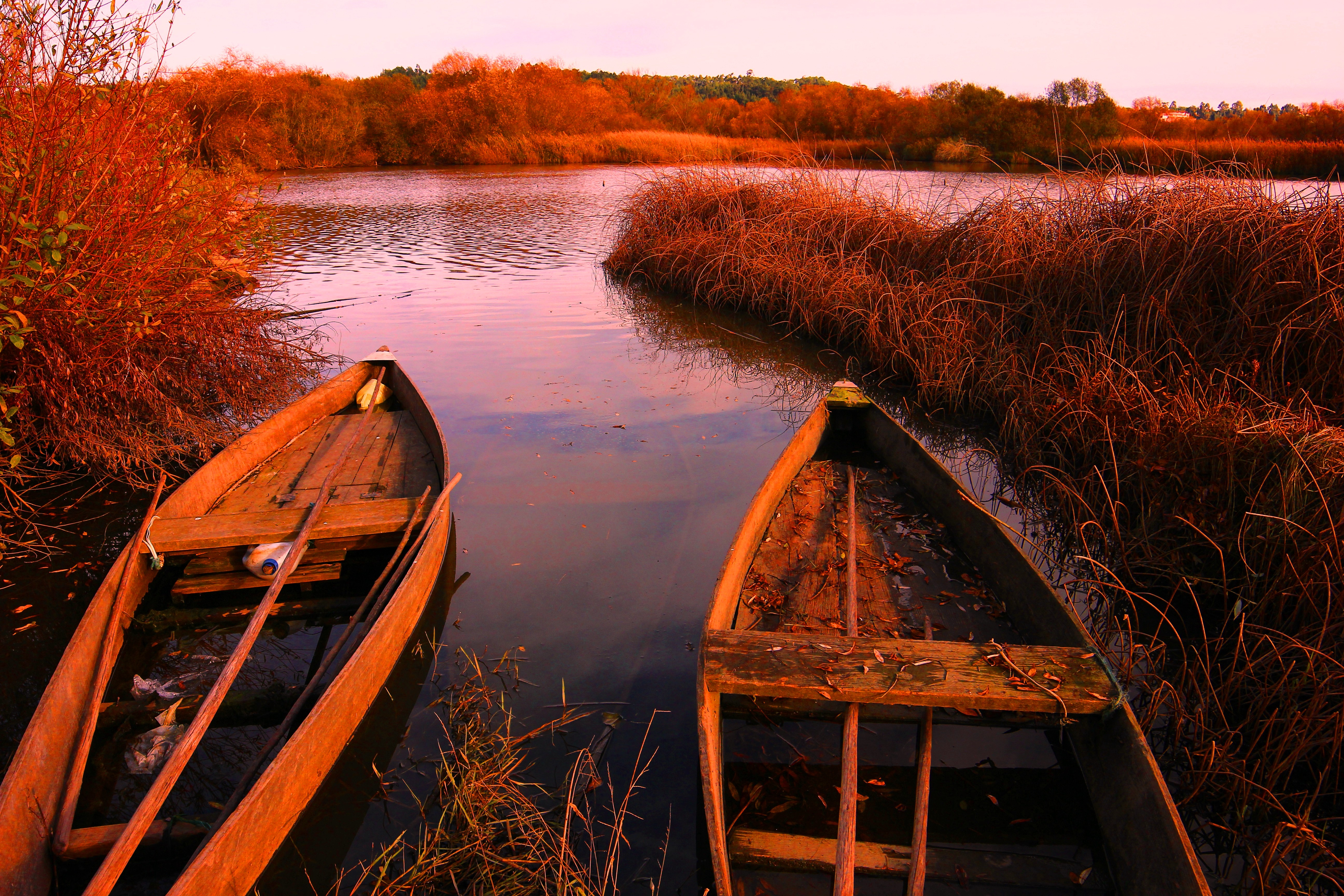
Bateiras (small fishing boats) in Pateira de Fermentelos

=== Human geography ===
Population of the municipality of Águeda (1849–2011)
Year	Pop.	±%
1849	9,247	—
1900	20,416	+120.8%
1930	25,982	+27.3%
1960	35,274	+35.8%
1981	43,216	+22.5%
1991	44,045	+1.9%
2001	49,041	+11.3%
2008	49,857	+1.7%
2011	47,729	−4.3%

Between 1991 and 2001, the population resident in Águeda increased 11.3%; these were primarily in parishes of Segadães (32.9%), Aguada de Cima (32.8%) and Recardães (20.8%), while there was a 32.9% decrease in the population. Population density increased in the parishes of Águeda, Recardães, Aguada de Baixo, Fermentelos and Trofa, while parishes closer to the interior (such as Agadão, Préstimo, Castanheira do Vouga and Macieira de Alcoba) were less concentrated.

Since the implementation of the national administrative reform in January 2013, the municipality includes 11 civil parishes (freguesias), resulting from the politico-administrative fusion of several of the former 20 parishes. These parishes handle local-level administrative tasks, which include provision of municipal and social services and are detailed in the following table:

Name	Area (km2)	Population (2011)	Seat
Aguada de Cima	28.39	4 013	Aguada de Cima
Águeda e Borralha	36.03	13 576	Águeda
Barrô e Aguada de Baixo	10.19	3 209	Barrô
Belazaima do Chão, Castanheira do Vouga e Agadão	88.09	1 611	Castanheira do Vouga
Fermentelos	8.58	3 258	Fermentelos
Macinhata do Vouga	31.95	3 406	Macinhata do Vouga
Préstimo e Macieira de Alcoba	41.73	808	Préstimo
Recardães e Espinhel	19.92	6 036	Recardães
Travassô e Óis da Ribeira	11.12	2 305	Travassô
Trofa, Segadães e Lamas do Vouga	16.07	4 630	Trofa
Valongo do Vouga	43.20	4 877	Valongo do Vouga

== Twin towns - sister cities ==
Águeda is twinned with:

- (Brazil) Rio Grande, Brasil, since 16 November 1993
- Bissau, Guinea-Bissau, since 10 March 1995
- Ferrol, Spain, since 26 August 1999
- Sint-Gillis-Waas, Belgium, since 25 August 2000
- Madalena, Portugal, since 11 April 2016

== Economy ==
Águeda is an important commercial and industrial center, located in an extremely fertile area. The gastronomical and economical region where it is inserted, known as the Bairrada, encompasses many of the local civil parishes and is well known for its vineyards and wine industry, as well as its suckling roasted pig (Leitão Assado à Bairrada).

It has also developed a strong industry, mainly based on the production of motorized and common bicycles and on civil construction. In 2001, 60% of the resident population was employed in the secondary sector, yet between 1991 and 2001 there has been a 53% increase in those employed in tertiary sector, while there has been a 78.4% decrease in secondary sector throughout the municipality.

== Transport ==
Part of the litoral area, the region is crossed by elements of the north-south Porto-Lisbon roadway, and served by intramunicipal roads connecting it with Albergaria-a-Velha (in the north), Oiã (in the south), along the A25 and EN333, and the major EN1/IC2 motorway, that produces the major traffic influx of the region. To reach Águeda, there are essentially three distinct roadways: the EN230 (that connects Aveiro to Caramulo), the EN333 (linking Oiã to the A25, in Talhadas) and the EN336, by way of the EN230 to Mortágua. Still further, the municipality is crossed in the north by the A25, that links Aveiro and Vilar Formoso, resulting in reduced traffic along the EN1/IC2 and EN333.

Even within the municipality, a 21,082 kilometres (13,100 mi) line of railway lines of the Vouga line, that links Aveiro and Sernada do Vouga, provides daily direct commuter service to railstops within the region.

== Architecture ==
There are several sites of cultural significance and landscapes within the municipality that the local authority has attempted to preserve in order to promote tourism; resulting in the establishment of infrastructures and services to preserve these examples of local patrimony.

=== Civic ===
- Archaeological site of Cabeço do Vouga (Portuguese: Estação arqueológica do Cabeço do Vouga), also referred by the Roman Castelium Marnelis, is an archeological excavation of an early Roman civitates in the foothills of the Vouga River (Cabeço da Mina, Cabeço Redonda and Cabeço do Vouga in Lamas da Vouga).

=== Religious ===
- Convent of Santo António (Portuguese: Convento de Santo António) located in Serém, its construction began in 1634 by Diogo Soares, the Count/Duke of Olivares, to house a dozen Franciscans from the province of Santo António. On 16 April 1635, the cornerstone was placed, and construction lasted until December 1640, at the Count's expense. Construction continued in 1641, and lasted until 1658–59, briefly interrupted by the lack of funds, which originally stopped the addition of a cloister, chorus and some monastery offices. With the abolition of the religious orders in 1834, the convent passed into the hands of José Henriques Ferreira, then Augusto Gomes, who improved some of the installations.
- Convent of Santa Maria de Lamas (Portuguese: Convento de Santa Maria de Lamas), was constructed (in 957) in the area of Passal, by Enderquina Pala, who later dedicated it to the Santissimo Salvador of Viseu (Holy Saviour of Viseu), but later donated it to the monastery of Lorvão (in 961). During the 17th century, it was remodeled, to include a commemorative wall, which has since been moved to the parochial church of Lamas do Vouga. In the 18th century, the convent's church was already in an advance state of degradation, resulting in the construction of a new church in the community of Lamas. The only remnants of original convent and church is a non-descriptive niche in the site in Passal.

== Culture ==
Among its traditional artisan products, the region is recognized for its traditional clay pottery, handmade baskets, knitted craft-works and tannery products.

The suckling roasted pig in the style of Bairrada is the most significant contribution to gastronomy in the region, although sweets are not far behind: pasteis de Águeda (English: custard), barriga de freira, fuzis and sequilhos, in addition to the padas da Veiga. Other common dishes in this region: chanfana, rojões, carne à lampantana or caldeirada de peixe (English: fish stew), all great meals that are accompanied by local wines and sparkling drinks from the cellars of the Bairrada region.

Alongside to the handmade production and the gastronomy, Águeda is also known for its cultural traditions. There are several ethnographical groups and cultural associations representing many local civil parishes and also important choirs, such as the Orfeão de Águeda.

== Sport ==
The municipality promotes many sport-related activities in the communities of Águeda, in order to foster participation and improve healthy living throughout its parishes. These initiatives include a walking and running program (Centro Municipal de Marcha e Corrida), support for many athletic clubs and leagues within its borders and the maintenance and operation of a municipal pool for local residents.

=== Major clubs ===
- Associação Atlética Macinhatense
- Associação Desportiva Valonguense
- Associação Recreativa e Cultural da Borralha - BARC
- Desportivo Atlético de Recardães - DAR
- Ginásio Clube de Águeda - GICA
- Liga dos Amigos de Aguada de Cima - LAAC
- Recreio Desportivo de Águeda
- Sporting Clube de Fermentelos
- União Desportiva Mourisquense

=== Notable athletes ===
- António dos Santos Baptista – from Aguada da Cima, António was awarded with a Silver Plate and road named in his honour, for his contributions to cyclism which included several regional championships, participation in the Tour de France, Vuelta a Espanã, Tour de Moroc and Vuelta a Andalucía, where he broke personal records, usually finished in the top-five.
- António Manuel Oliveira Monteiro – natural of the parish of Águeda, participated in several canoeing championships, such as the International Regatt in Ribadesella (Spain), the Milan Regatta, European Junior and Senior Championships, the Iberian Tournament and Barcelona Summer Olympics, and returned several first-place trophies.
- Arnaldo Abrantes – (born 1961), a sprinter who competed in the men's 4 × 100 metres relay at the 1988 Summer Olympics.
- Fábio Cardoso – (born 1994), football player (centre-back).
- Hernâni Ferreira da Silva – (1 September 1931 – 5 April 2001), natural of the parish of Águeda, was a football player. Starting to play at his hometown club Recreio de Águeda, Hernâni quickly drew the attention of F.C.Porto to which he transferred in 1950. He played for the club his whole career until 1964, with the exception of the 1952–53 season in which he played (on a loan) for Estoril Praia, due to the military conscription and under the condition of not playing against F.C.Porto. He also played 28 matches for the Portugal national football team scoring 6 goals. Regarding honours, he was 2 times National Champion and won 2 Portuguese Cups. Considered as an exceptional player, he is amongst the F.C.Porto most notable players list of all times (253 apps, scoring 127 goals for the club) and was chosen by Portuguese sports newspaper Record as one of the best 100 Portuguese football players ever.
- Mario Leandro Silva Galhano – (born 1982), football player (defender) with C.D. Feirense in Liga de Honra.

== Notable citizens ==
Apart from those athletes mentioned above, the municipality has been the residency of many importance citizens, including:

- Manuel Homem de Melo da Câmara, (Wiki PT) (1866–1953), 1st Earl of Águeda
- Manuel Alegre de Melo Duarte (born 1936), a writer, politician and candidate for the Presidency of Portugal in 2006 & 2011
- Nucha (born 1966), a singer who participated in the 1990 Eurovision Song Contest
- João Pedro Matos Fernandes (born 1967) a Portuguese politician, Minister of Environment since 2015
- António de Vasconcelos Nogueira (born 1931) a philosopher, author, dramatist and freelance journalist.
