= Nez Cassé =

Series of locomotives

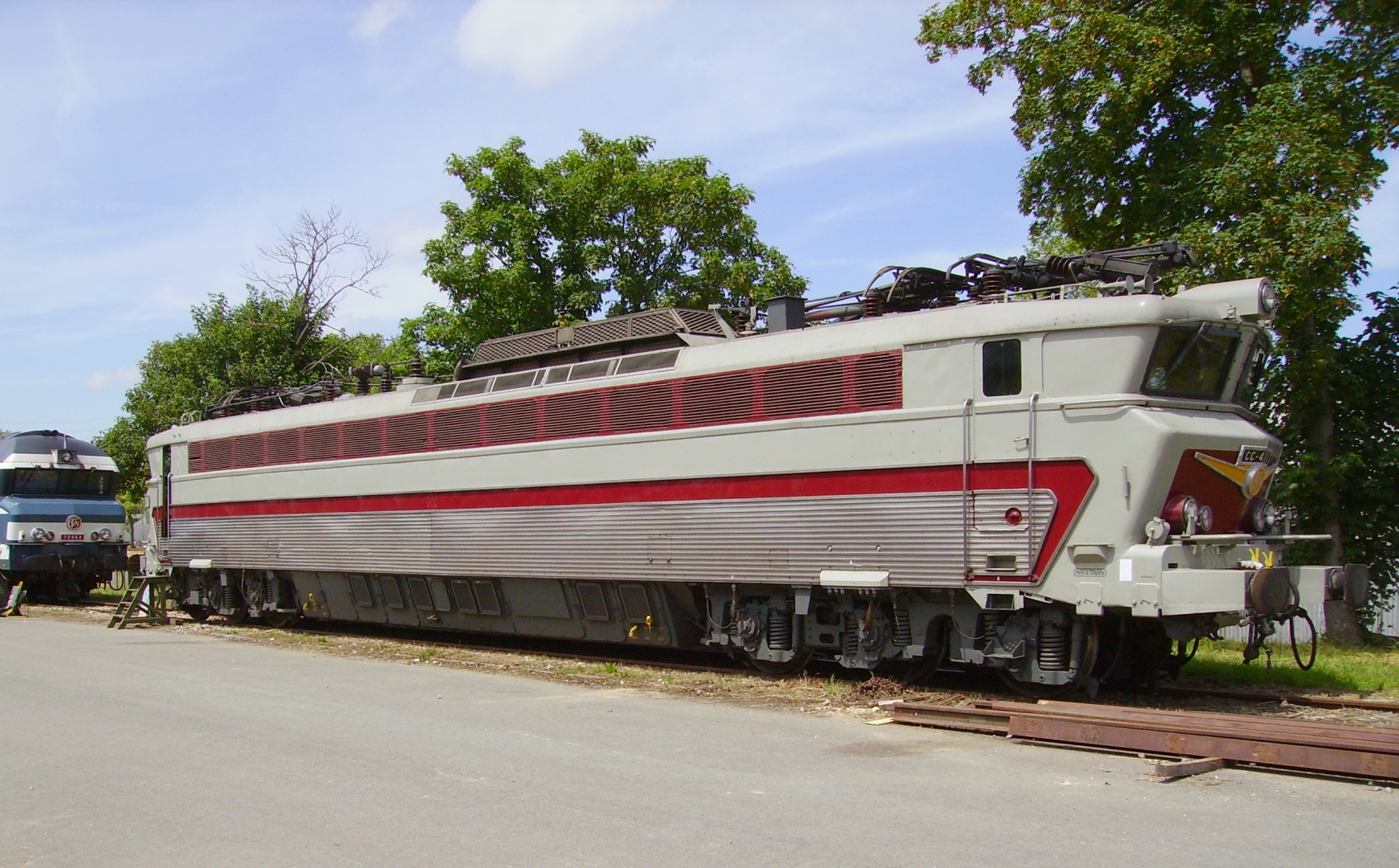
CC 40100 locomotive

The Nez Cassé series of locomotives is a large family of electric and diesel locomotives intended primarily for fast passenger service on the French SNCF railway system. Produced by Alsthom for use under multiple electrification networks and unelectrified lines, they have been in widespread use from the 1960s into the 21st century. Classes produced in the main series were BB 7200/7600 and CC 6500 under 1.5 kV DC, BB15000 under 25 kV 50 Hz AC, BB 22200 (7200+15000) and CC 21000 under dual 1.5 kV DC and 25 kV 50 Hz AC, and the diesel CC 72000/72100.

The locomotive series was developed from the 1964 quadruple-voltage CC 40100, designed by Paul Arzens, which was mainly used for Trans Europ Express international service. The CC 40100 featured a forward-leaning nose and windshield that drew comparisons with a broken-nose facial profile ("Nez Cassé"). A greater emphasis on crash protection for engine drivers in the following series added depth to the nose and changed the broken-nosed profile.

The first versions for the SNCF that were introduced in 1969, the 1.5kV CC 6500 and the 1.5/25kV CC 21000, used a Co'Co' bogie arrangement on account of their substantial weight. The unique BBB 8000 used by Korail from 1972 used a Bo'Bo'Bo' bogie arrangement due to track loading requirements and Korean rail geometry requirements. The later BB 7200, BB 15000 and BB 22200 were substantially lightened, and could use a Bo'Bo' arrangement. These later series, introduced by the SNCF from 1971–1976, were also less costly to procure.

== List of Nez Cassé locomotives ==
Below is a list of locomotives around the world built in this style.

Class	Country	Operator(s)	Build Date(s)	Wheel Arrangement (UIC)	Wheel Arrangement (AAR)	Image
SNCF Class BB 7200	France	SNCF	1976-1985	Bo'Bo'	B-B	
SNCF Class BB 15000	France	SNCF	1971-1978	Bo'Bo'	B-B	
SNCF Class BB 22200; Class 22 (II)	France; United Kingdom (Note: Assigned for BB 22200 locomotives that hauled freight trains through the Channel Tunnel, from 1994 to 1995.)	SNCF	1976-1986	Bo'Bo'	B-B	
SNCF Class CC 6500	France	SNCF	1969-1975	Co'Co'	C-C	
SNCF Class CC 21000	France	SNCF	1995-1996	Co'Co'	C-C	
SNCF Class CC 72000	France	SNCF	1967-1974	Co'Co'	C-C	
SNCF Class CC 40100	France	SNCF	1964, 1969-1970	Co'Co'	C-C	
SNCB Class 18 (Alsthom)	Belgium	NMBS/SNCB	1973-1974	Co'Co'	C-C	
Amtrak X996	United States	Amtrak	1977	Co'Co'	C-C	
CP Class 2600	Portugal	Comboios de Portugal	1974-1975	Bo'Bo'	B-B	
CP Class 2620	Portugal	Comboios de Portugal	1987-1989	Bo'Bo'	B-B	
CP Class 1900	Portugal	Comboios de Portugal	1981	Co'Co'	C-C	
CP Class 1930	Portugal	Comboios de Portugal	1981-1982	Co'Co'	C-C	
NS Class 1600	Netherlands	Nederlandse Spoorwegen; Railion	1981-1983	Bo'Bo'	B-B	
NS Class 1700	Netherlands	Nederlandse Spoorwegen	1990-1994	Bo'Bo'	B-B	
NS Class 1800	Netherlands	Nederlandse Spoorwegen	1981-1983	Bo'Bo'	B-B	
SŽ Series 363	Slovenia	Slovenian Railways	1975-1977	Co'Co'	C-C	
Korail Class 8000	South Korea	Korail	1972-1990	Bo'Bo'Bo'	B-B-B	
FEPASA 2200 ^{(pt)}	Brazil	Ferrovia Paulista	1984	Bo'Bo'	B-B	
ONCF Class DF 100	Morocco	ONCF	N/A	Co'Co'	C-C	
ONCF Class DF 115	Morocco	ONCF	N/A	Co'Co'	C-C	
ONCF Class E 1300	Morocco	ONCF	N/A	Bo'Bo'	B-B	
ONCF Class E 1350	Morocco	ONCF	N/A	Bo'Bo'	B-B	

== Other operators ==
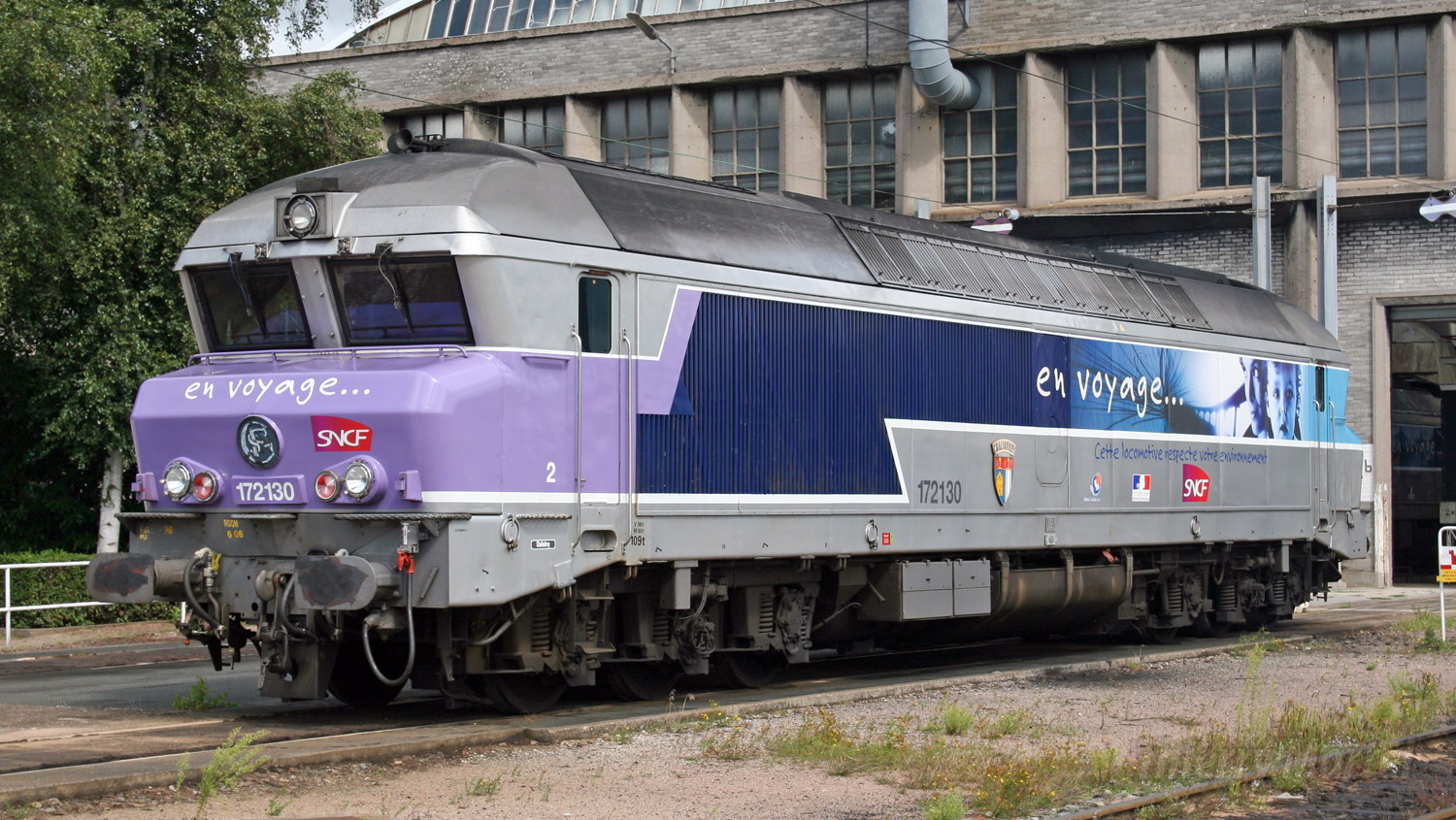
CC 72000 locomotive

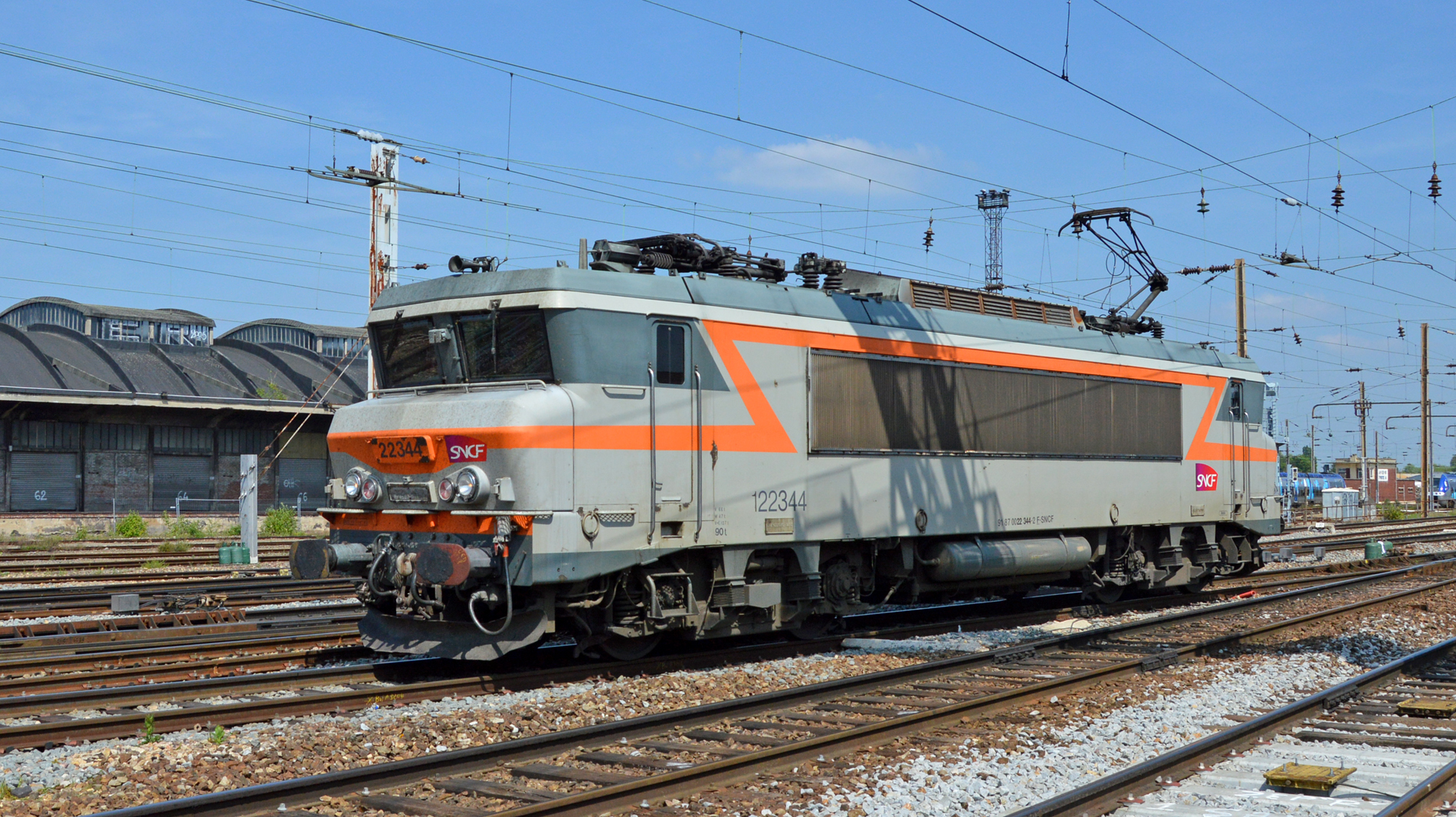
BB 22200 locomotive

The Nederlandse Spoorwegen NS Class 1600 and NS Class 1700 versions of BB 7200 continue in use on the Dutch railway system under 1.5 kV DC. The Belgian Railways Class 18 was the Belgian equivalent of CC 40100, and was in service from 1973 to 1999.

Moroccan operator ONCF uses diesel locomotives similar to CC 72000, the ONCF DF 100. The ONCF E 900 is similar to the CC 6500 and the ONCF E 1300/1350 is similar to the BB 7200, both under 3 kV DC . The Portuguese CP Class 1900 and CP Class 1930 were built under license by Sorefame in 1981 as versions of CC 72000 and CP Class 2600 (electric) as version of BB22200. The South Korean Korail Class 8000 is a development for 25 kV 60 Hz AC with a Bo-Bo-Bo arrangement. Slovenian Railways uses 3 kV DC versions of CC 6500 (identical to the ONCF E900 and using the same transmission) as SŽ series 363.

FEPASA in São Paulo State, Brazil ordered 80 3 kV DC locomotives in the mid-1980s for its metre gauge and Irish gauge network called FEPASA 2200 series (or Alsthom EC-386) for use on the Araguari-Santos Export Corridor and other prospective electrified lines on its network. The locomotives were to be assembled by Brazilian manufacturer EMAQ using knock-down kits imported from France, however, the bankruptcy of said manufacturer and severe financial difficulties at FEPASA meant that only two locomotives were actually completed. Both locomotives were used by FEPASA until its privatization in the late-1990s and were abandoned, because its successor concessionary companies Ferroban and Rumo Logística have largely abandoned further electrification work on the rest of the FEPASA network.

A single CC 21000 locomotive, CC 21003, was temporarily allocated to the U.S. Amtrak system as X996 in 1977 for testing on Amtrak's Northeast Corridor.
