= CP Class 2600 =

Class of 12 Portuguese electric locomotives

CP Class 2600/2620
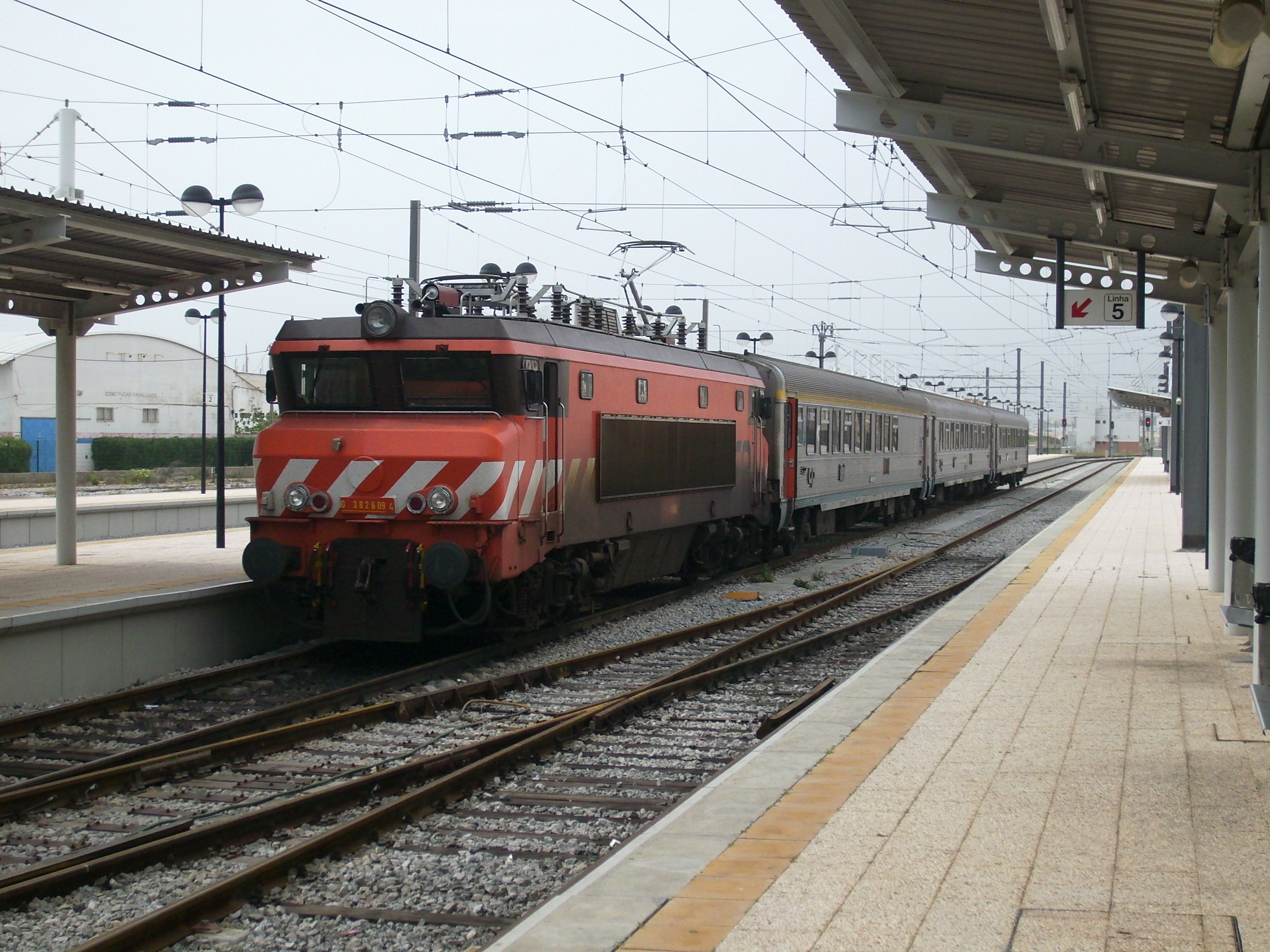
- Locomotive 2609 at Faro station
Type and origin
- Power type: Electric
- Builder: Sorefame (under licence from Groupement 50 Hz/Alsthom)
Specifications
- Configuration
  - UIC: Bo'Bo'
- Gauge: 1,668 mm (5 ft 5 21/32 in) Iberian gauge
- Electric system/s: 25 kV AC Catenary
- Current pickup: Pantograph
Performance figures
- Maximum speed: 160 km/h (High Speed), 100 km/h (Low Speed)
Career
- Operators: Comboios de Portugal
- Class: 2600
- Number in class: 12 (8 2600's and 3 2620's)
- Numbers: 2601–2612; 2621–2629

Série 2600, nicknamed Nez-Cassée ("Broken Nose"), is a type of 25 kV 50 Hz electric locomotive currently used by Comboios de Portugal. They are closely based on the SNCF Class BB 15000 locomotive design. The locomotives are part of the Nez Cassé family of locomotives, a popular locomotive style designed by Paul Arzens, designed by Groupement 50 Hz (a French consortium led by Alsthom) and entered service in 1974 (Série 2600) and 1987 (Śerie 2620) Of the 12 built, 9 were still in service in 2012. They have a top speed of 160 km/h.

Série 2620 is physically identical to Série 2600. Nine locomotives were assembled in Portugal by Sorefame in 1987 (under licence from Groupement 50 Hz/Alsthom); as of 2012 seven remained in service.

The locomotives are less powerful than the newer Série 4700 and 5600 locomotives, sometimes leading to late running on services. As of 2011, CP Carga (the freight division of CP) was able to discontinue using the Série 2600 and 2620 locomotives. As of 2012, it was expected that the remaining locomotives would be withdrawn within the next few years. As of 2013 all had been withdrawn from service.

As part of a June 2019 government plan to reintroduce withdrawn rolling stock, it is expected that this series will re-enter service. In September 2019, a first 2600 locomotive was hauled to Contumil to be repaired, followed by four more in October.

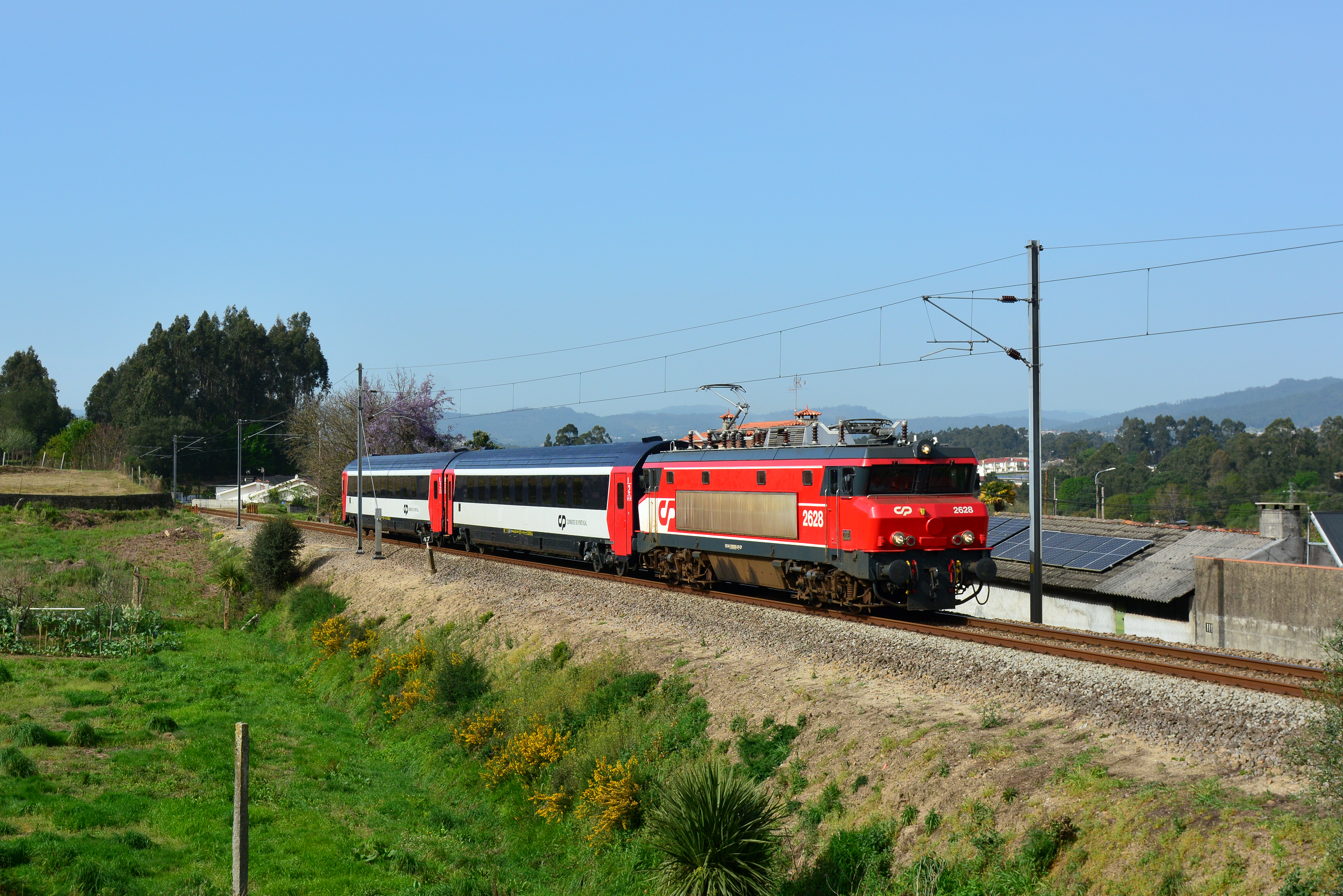
Locomotive 2628 painted with the new livery

As of 2023, CP had introduced a new paint scheme for this class. The new livery was applied to unit 2628 (Part of Série 2620) and recently, 2604 ((Part of Série 2600), based on the first livery of the class 4700 (All sold to Medway). The new livery sports a modern red colour with white markings on the side with the CP logo sticking out.

== Diagram ==
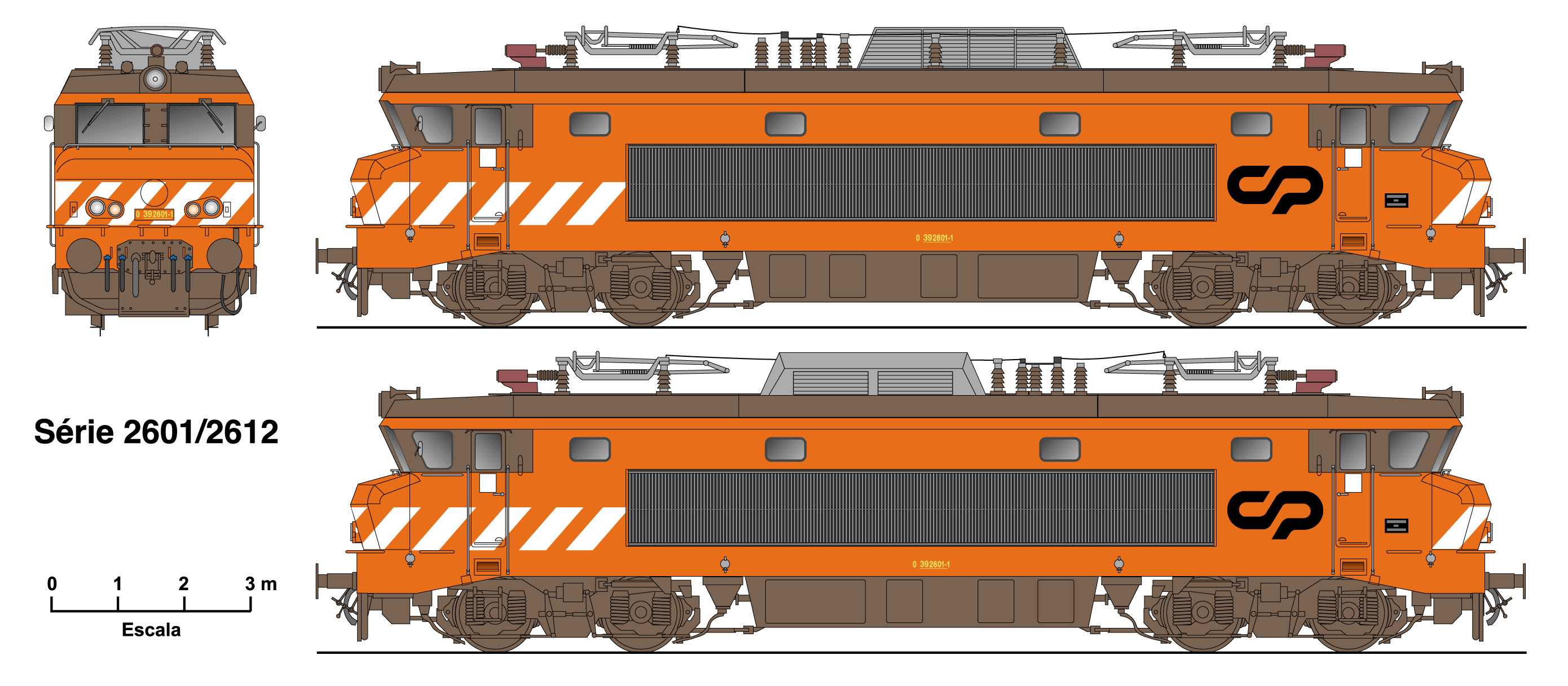

== See also ==
- CP Class 1900
- CP Class 1930
- Netherlands Railways (NS) class 1600 - also derived from the French BB 15000 class
- SŽ series 363
- SNCF Class BB 15000
