= SNCF Class BB 15000 =

Class of 65 French electric locomotives

SNCF BB 15000
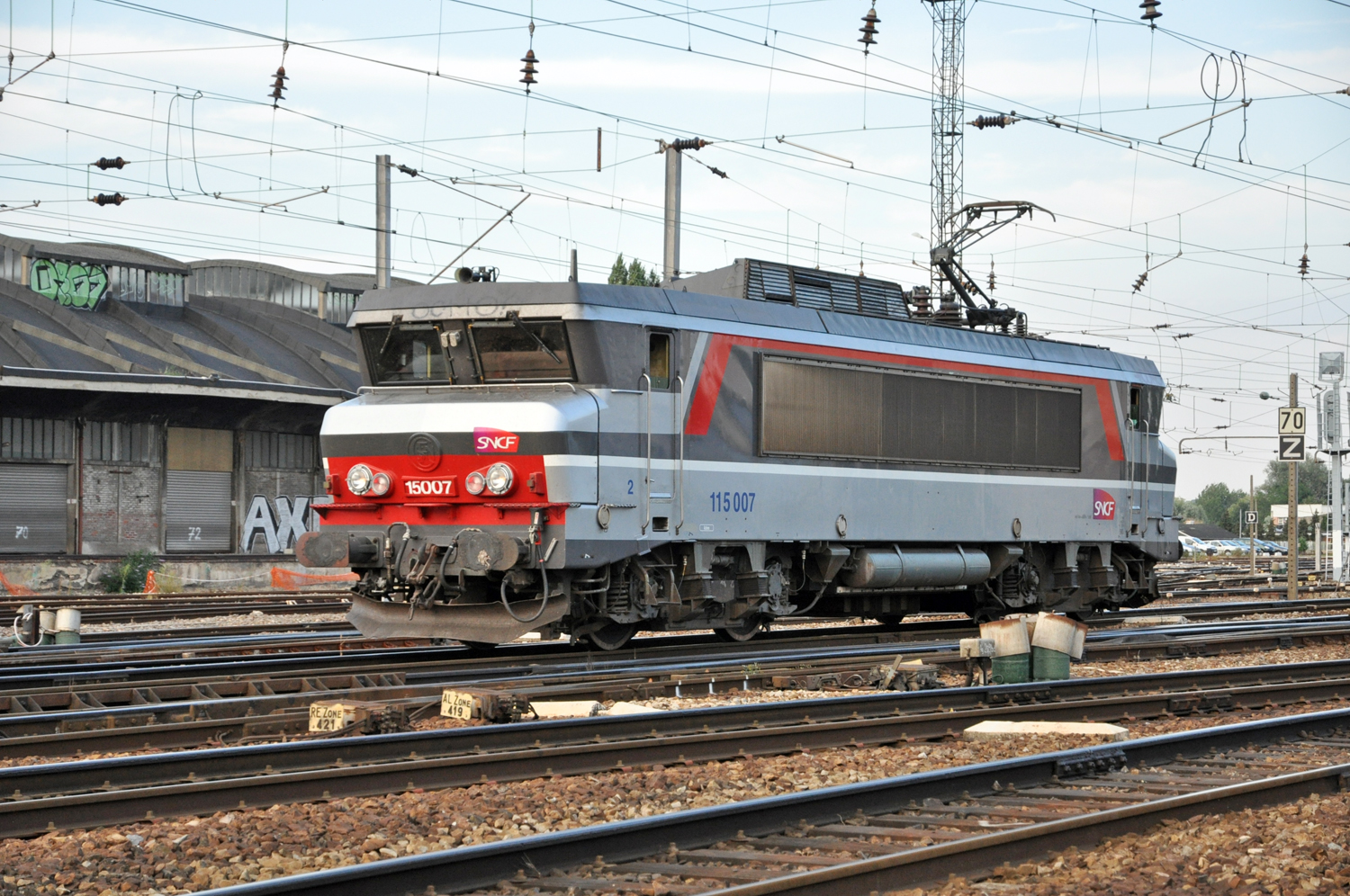
- BB 15007 in Multiservices livery at the Gare d'Amiens in 2010
Type and origin
- Power type: Electric
- Builder: Alstom & MTE
- Build date: 1971 – 1978
Specifications
- Configuration
  - UIC: B'B'
- Gauge: 1,435 mm (4 ft 8 1/2 in) standard gauge
- Length: 17.48 m (57 ft 4 in)
- Width: 3.05 m (10 ft 0 in)
- Height: 4.29 m (14 ft 1 in)
- Loco weight: 82 t (81 long tons; 90 short tons)
- Electric system/s: 25 kV 50 Hz AC catenary
- Current pickup(s): Pantograph
- Traction motors: 1.5 kV DC traction motors controlled by thyristors
- Transmission: 73/44 gear ratio
- Safety systems: Crocodile, KVB. SNCF-VFE locomotives also have Memor II+
Performance figures
- Maximum speed: 160 km/h (99 mph) (service); 180 km/h (110 mph) (design)
- Power output: 4,420 kW (5,930 hp) max; 4,400 kW (5,900 hp) cont
- Tractive effort: 294 kN (66,000 lb_{f}) max; 190 kN (43,000 lb_{f}) cont @ 98 km/h (61 mph); 90 kN (20,000 lb_{f}) regen braking 130 km/h (81 mph)- 0 km/h (0 mph)
Career
- Operators: SNCF-VFE/SNCF-CIC/SNCF-TER
- Number in class: 59
- Nicknames: "Nez cassés", "BB 4400kW"
- First run: 1971
- Disposition: Six scrapped, remainder in service

The SNCF class BB 15000 is a class of 25 kV 50 Hz electric locomotives built by Alstom and MTE between 1971 and 1978. Initially 65 locomotives strong, the class was widely deployed on the whole French 25 kV network before being replaced by TGV trains when the LGV Est went into service in 2007.

== History ==
In the mid-1960s, SNCF sought a new type of dual-current electric locomotives. As thyristor technology advanced rapidly, SNCF decided to adopt the new technology for a new series of locomotives, later known as the Nez Cassés (Broken Noses, due to their cab styling by Paul Arzens) or BB 4400 kW. Given that the need for pure AC-locomotives was greatest, SNCF placed an initial order of five locomotives in 1968. In 1969 a second order of 10 locomotives followed, in 1970 a third order was made for another 10 locomotives. The remaining 40 locomotives were ordered in 1973.

The first five locomotives were delivered in 1971 in the overall-green "Maurienne" livery. The rest followed between 1973 and 1978, painted in the striking TEE-Arzens livery. Initially meant to support BB16000 locomotives on eastern and northeastern lines, which could not keep up with the timetables anymore after top speed on some sections was raised to 160 km/h (99 mph), the BB15000 series would become the most important locomotives on the northern and northeast network.

== Career ==
=== 1970s-2007 ===
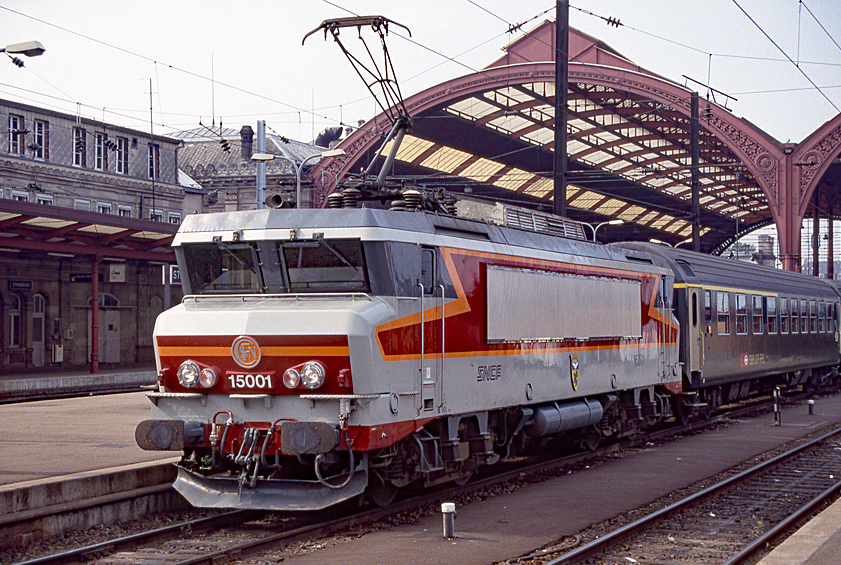
SNCF BB 15001 Gretz-Amainvilliers at Strasbourg-Ville station in 1992

After being tested on the Paris–Épernay main line in 1971, they entered revenue service from 1972. They ran mostly on the northeastern network where they hauled nearly all the principle passenger trains, including the national TEE trains Kléber and Stanislas. Some services extended to the northwest, with workings to Lille, Calais and the Belgian border at Quévy.

Services remained stable throughout the 1970s and 1980s, but the opening of the Ligne-a-Grande-Vitesse Nord in 1993 started a cascade of assignments in which the BB 15000's lost services to either dual-voltage BB 26000 locomotives or to TGV trains. Yet BB 15000 locomotives remained strong in the northeast and hauled Corail Téoz services between Paris and Strasbourg from 2003 until mid-2005, when half of the loco-hauled services were converted to TGV trainsets, albeit still running on the classic line. In mid-2006 the remainder were also converted into TGV services, leaving only some TER trains for the Lorraine and Alsace regions, and the EuroCity trains between Basel and Brussels (loco change at Luxemburg) or Paris and Frankfurt (loco change at Strasbourg).

The partial opening of the LGV Est in June 2007 meant the end of classic locomotive-hauled Intercity trains between Paris and the northeastern regions, with BB 15000 locomotives losing a great deal of importance there.

=== 2007-present ===
Although the end of locomotive-hauled Intercity trains in the northeast marked a downgrading of duties, it did not result in the withdrawal of the class. The remaining 60 locomotives are divided over the following three sectors:

- Twelve locomotives were allocated to SNCF-VFE and worked Basel-Luxembourg EuroCity services, as well as DB AutoZug's night train from Paris-Nord to the Belgian border. These locomotives are fitted with the Memor II+ safety system which enables them to operate in Luxembourg. These locomotives are numbered in the 115000 series. This Basel-Luxembourg EuroCity service ended during the summer of 2016 and the locomotives assigned to it were reassigned at that time.
- Twenty-eight locomotives are allocated to SNCF-CIC (Corail Intercité) and are working medium to long distance regional services between Paris and Amiens/Maubeuge on the one end, and Paris-Caen/Deauville/Le Havre on the other end. Twelve locomotives of this sub-series, called BB215000R (from "Réversible"), are fitted with MUX which enables them to work in push-pull with the Corail B6Dux driving trailers and will be replacing BB216000 locomotives there. This sub-series is numbered in the 215000 series.
- Twenty locomotives are allocated to SNCF-TER Champagne-Ardennes, Haute-Normandie and Picardie, working fast TER services and replacing the remaining BB516000 locomotives. Fifteen locomotives of this sub-series, called BB515000R, are fitted with MUX in able to operate in push-pull mode with V2N driving trailers on Paris-Rouen (Haute-Normandie) and Paris-Amiens (Picardie) and will be replacing BB516100 locomotives there. This sub-series is numbered in the 515000 series.

== Technology ==
The locomotive's body shell is shared with the other members of the "Nez Cassé" (broken nose) family (BB7200, BB22200) and is of the monocoque type.

The cab layout is shared with the BB7200 and BB22200 series and has a great deal in common with cabs of other SNCF locomotives of the 1960s. This class was also the first to introduce the VI ("Vitesse Imposée") cruise control system which is now standard on all SNCF locomotives delivered after 1971.

The electrical equipment consists of a single pantograph (type AM18U) which collects 25 kV from the catenary. Power is passed through a transformer which lowers the voltage to about 1500 V AC and a bridge rectifier controlled by thyristors rectify it into DC, which is then fed into the traction motors.

Brake equipment consists of pneumatic, electro-pneumatic, regenerative and dynamic brakes. The monomotor bogies were derived from the Y217 bogies of BB67400 locomotives and have primary (coil springs) and secondary ("sandwich" blocs) suspension.

The reliability of the locomotives is outstanding, as some locomotives have already passed the 10,000,000 km mark and have less than 2 defects per million kilometres, a number unrivaled by other similar European locomotives.

== Liveries ==
BB15000 locomotives have carried at least six different liveries:

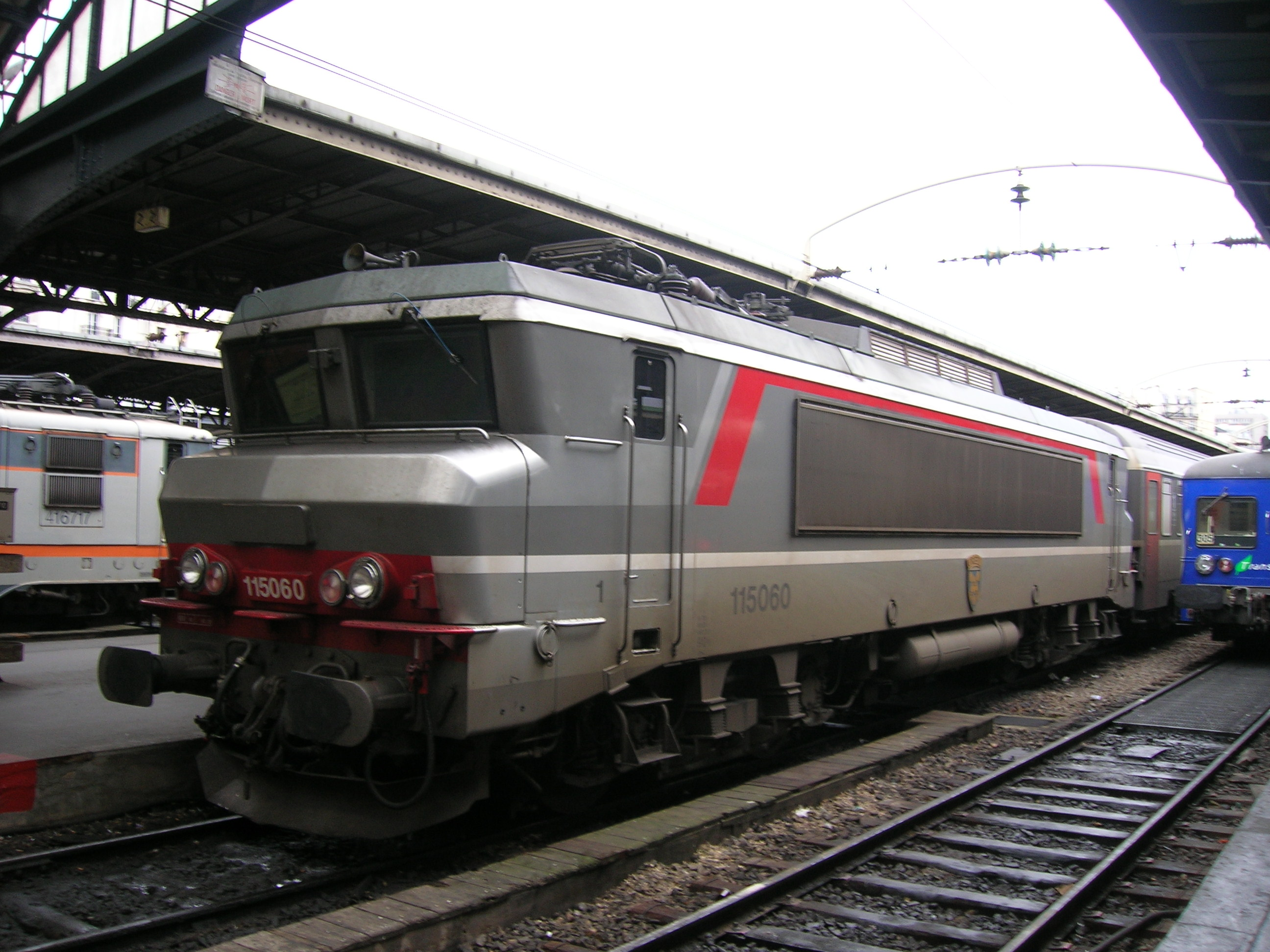
BB 15060 in "Multiservices" livery at Paris-Est.

- The green "Maurienne" livery (so called because CC6500 locomotives also wore this livery and operated in the French Maurienne region) was worn by locomotives BB15001 - BB15005 between their delivery and 1982, when they were repainted into the TEE-Arzens livery.

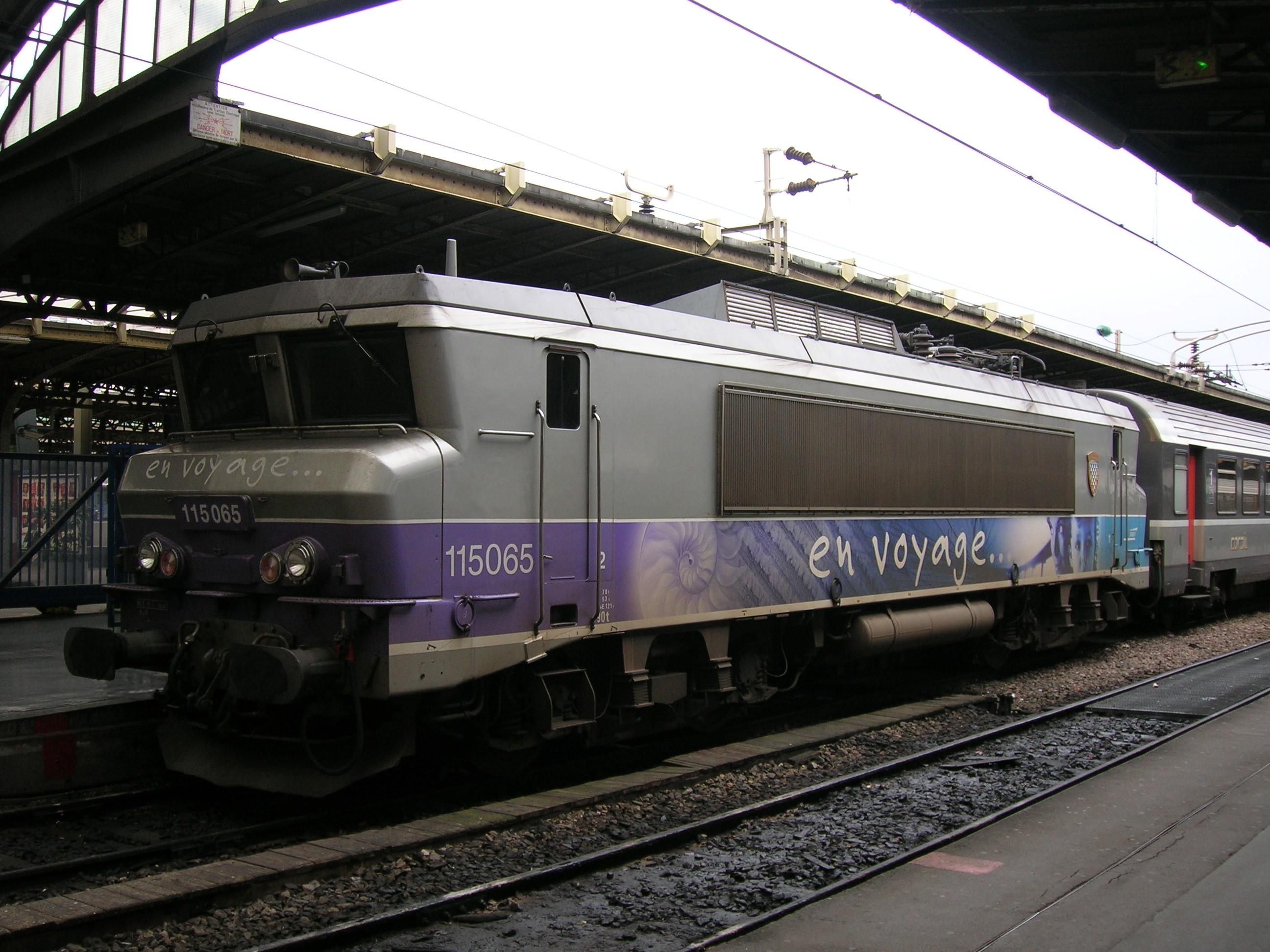
BB 15065 in "En voyage..." livery at Paris-Est.

- The TEE-Arzens livery was worn by locomotives from number BB15006 onwards by delivery; the first five green locomotives were also repainted in this livery in 1982. There were two variants of this livery: the original livery which consisted of silver, red and orange, and the modified one where the silver was replaced with opaque gray. Nowadays a number of locomotives still wear the original livery, the others having another one listed below.
- The "béton" (lit. concrete) livery, which was the standard livery of BB7200 and BB22200 locomotives, was tested on locomotives BB15034 and BB15040 in 1986-87 but was considered a failure as the locomotives got dirty too fast.
- The "Multiservices" livery (former known as Corail+, as on the coaches) was introduced in 1995 on BB15016 and consisted of two shades of gray, silver and red. Nearly half of the class was painted in this livery by 2002, when the new "en voyage..." livery was introduced on the series.
- The "en voyage..." livery was the latest livery of the class. Introduced on BB15063 in 2002. It consists of silver, purple on cab side 1 and cyan on cab side 2, and the "en voyage..." sticker with stylish motifs. The rights to use this design have expired and all locos still wearing it will be repainted in something else upon their next overhaul.
- A number of BB 15000 locos have been repainted in TER liveries of the regions where they run.

== The experimental uses of the class ==
BB 15000 locomotives were popular locomotives for conducting various experiments:

- In 1972, BB 15001 was used for testing a potential speed increase to 200 km/h (120 mph) on the Paris-Strasbourg main line (sections Épernay - Châlons-sur-Marne, Vitry-le-François - Bar-le-Duc and Lunéville - Sarrebourg). While the locomotive had no technical difficulties at those speeds, the project was not continued due to the enormous cost of the infrastructure works which had to be undertaken.
- In 1973, BB15008 was used to test communication interferences on the now defunct Überherrn-Wadgassen line in Germany, exceptionally fed with 25 kV at that time.
- In 1974, BB 15007 was taken out of service and transformed into BB 7003, the prototype for the BB 7200 locomotives. In 1982 the same loco was converted to SNCF Class BB 10003 to trial the development of asynchronous induction traction motors. At the end of the testing in 1997, it reverted to its original configuration as BB 10007.
- In 1976, BB 15015 was tested on the Marseille-Nice main line in order to prepare the line for the arrival of the similar, but bicurrent BB 22200 locomotives.
- In 1977, BB 15041 operated special demonstration rides between Épernay and Châlons-sur-Marne at 200 km/h (120 mph) for Amtrak executives in order to convince them to buy a locomotive based on this design rather than the Swedish-based AEM-7. Eventually six-axle locomotive CC 21003 was rebuilt to US standards and sent to the United States instead.
- In 1978, BB 15012 received the lower-geared bogies of locomotive BB 22201 and was tested on various lines with heavy freight trains with weights up to 2,200 tonnes (2,165 long tons; 2,425 short tons), in order to test the performances against BB 22000 locomotives.
- In 1979, BB 15063 was equipped with the bogies of BB 7248 which had a modified secondary suspension for operating in the Middle East. The Iranian Railways were interested in purchasing a locomotive class based on the BB 15000 design. BB 15063 was tested with heavy trains up to 2,000 tonnes (1,968 long tons; 2,205 short tons) on various 25 kV lines. BB 15063 retains these special bogies even today.
- In 1979 BB 15030 was used for stability tests in the Marne valley region at speeds up to 230 km/h (140 mph).
- In 1980, a BB 15000 locomotive hauled middle cars of a TGV Sud-Est train set at high speeds in preparation of their services on the LGV Sud-Est.
- Later that year, BB 15008 was sent to the Rail Tec Arsenal climatic test chamber in Vienna for thermal tests up to −30 °C (−22 °F).
- In 1981, locomotives BB 15049 and BB 15059 were used for testing the behaviour of the AM18U pantographs at high speeds in tunnels, related to use in the then not yet built Channel Tunnel.
- In 1982, BB 15055 received synchronous motors. Later that year it was renumbered BB 10004. In 1989, it was restored to its original configuration and taken back into service with its original number.
- Also in 1982, BB 15056 received a bimotor bogie with motors similar to the ones used in TGV Sud-Est sets.

== Fleet list ==
Many of the class were named after French communes, towns and cities.

Number	Renumbered	Name	Notes
BB 15001		Gretz-Armainvilliers	
BB 15002		Longwy	
BB 15003		Sarreguemines	
BB 15004		Sedan	
BB 15005		Saint-Louis	
BB 15006		Metz	
BB 15007	BB 7003; BB 10003		Reverted to its original condition and number in 1997
BB 15008		Nancy	
BB 15009		Reims	
BB 15010		Strasbourg	
BB 15011			
BB 15012		Châlons-sur-Marne	
BB 15013		Longuyon	
BB 15014		Thionville	
BB 15015		Biarritz	
BB 15016		Charleville-Mézières	
BB 15017		Saint-Avold	
BB 15018			
BB 15019		Montigny-lès-Metz	
BB 15020		Pau	
BB 15021		Château-Thierry	
BB 15022		Pantin	
BB 15023		Meaux	
BB 15024		Lunéville	
BB 15025			
BB 15026		Épernay	
BB 15027		Creutzwald	
BB 15028		Villiers-le-Bel	
BB 15029		Aurillac	
BB 15030		Forbach	
BB 15031		Moyeuvre-Grande	
BB 15032		Chambley	
BB 15033		Gagny	
BB 15034		Sète	
BB 15035		Nogent-sur-Marne	
BB 15036		Le Perreux-sur-Marne	
BB 15037		La Ferté-sous-Jouarre	
BB 15038			
BB 15039		Rosny-sous-Bois	
BB 15040			
BB 15041			
BB 15042			
BB 15043		Maizières-lès-Metz	
BB 15044			
BB 15045			
BB 15046			
BB 15047			
BB 15048			
BB 15049			
BB 15050		Vitry-le-François	
BB 15051		Aulnoye-Aymeries	
BB 15052		Cambrai	
BB 15053		Trouville	
BB 15054			
BB 15055	BB 10004		Reverted to its original condition and number in 1989
BB 15056		Vannes	
BB 15057			
BB 15058		Épinal	
BB 15059		Tourcoing	
BB 15060		Creil	
BB 15061		Sarrebourg	
BB 15062		Montmédy	
BB 15063		Verdun	
BB 15064		Saverne	
BB 15065		Vaires-sur-Marne	

== Models ==
- This locomotive was reproduced in H0 scale by Jouef, Lima, LS Models, Märklin and Roco.
- This locomotive was reproduced in N scale by Fleischmann and Minitrix.

== See also ==
- China Railways 8K - export variant to China
- CP Class 2600 - similar locomotives built for the Portuguese Railways in 1974, with a 1,668 mm (5 ft 5 21/32 in) track gauge
- Korail Class 8000 - similar locomotives for Korail
- SŽ series 363 - similar locomotives for Slovenske Železnice
- NS Class 1600 - similar locomotives for Nederlandse Spoorwegen
- FEPASA Class 2200 - similar locomotives for Ferrovia Paulista S/A
