= SNCF Class BB 10003 =

SNCF BB 10003
Type and origin
- Power type: Electric
- Builder: Alstom / MTE
- Build date: 1982 (converted from BB 7003)
- Total produced: 1
Specifications
- Configuration
  - UIC: Bo'Bo'
- Gauge: 1,435 mm (4 ft 8 1/2 in)
- Wheel diameter: 1,250 mm (49.21 in)
- Loco weight: 92 t (91 long tons; 101 short tons)
- Electric system/s: 25 kV AC Catenary; For TMST tests (1991-2) : 3 kV DC Catenary, 750 V DC Third rail †
- Current pickup(s): For 25 kV and 3 kV DC, Pantograph; For 750 V DC, Contact shoe (Note: For UK system, on Trans-Manche link.)
- Traction motors: 4 asynchronous motors type AST5B1
Performance figures
- Maximum speed: 160 km/h (99 mph)
- Power output: 5 MW (6,700 hp)
Career
- Withdrawn: 1998
- Disposition: reinstated as BB 15007 in 1998

The locomotive SNCF BB 10003 was an experimental prototype locomotive converted from a SNCF BB 15000 electric locomotive and used to develop the use of asynchronous induction traction motors.

== History ==
The locomotive BB 10003 was created from an earlier experimental machine BB 7003 in 1982. It was used to test the use of asynchronous induction motors in locomotives. (Note: A contemporary prototype, the BB 10004 which was used to test synchronous motors gave better results with the available technology (lower mass, and an easier implementation of regenerative braking) was preferred, and led to the SNCF BB 26000 class.)

From 1986 to 1987 the locomotive was used in experiments testing the viability of a diesel electric locomotive with asynchronous traction motors; the locomotive was coupled to a remotorised SNCF CC 72000 locomotive which acted as an electrical generator.

In 1990/1 the locomotive was used as a test machine for operations of the TGV-TMST on 750 V and 3000 V. In 1998 the locomotive was converted back to a non-experimental class - as SNCF BB 15007. (SNCF Class BB 15000)

=== Legacy ===
The results were not as good as synchronous motor technology; it was not until the introduction of GTO transistor technology that series production of an asynchronous induction motored locomotive began in France, as the Eurostar TGV (1992), and later the BB 36000 Astride (1996).
