= SNCF Class CC 72100 =

Class of 30 rebuilt units from CC 72000 diesel-electric locomotives

Class CC 72100
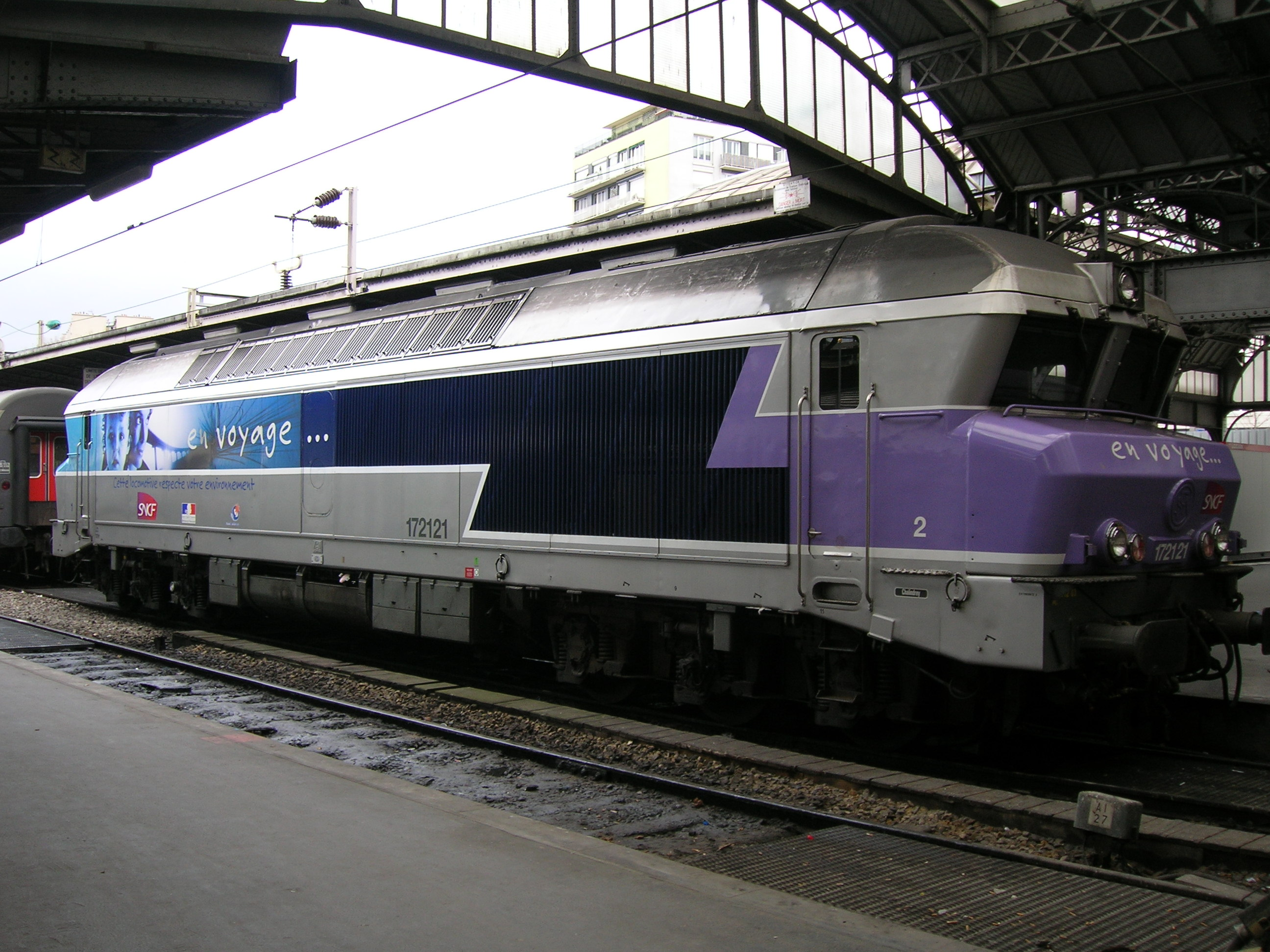
- CC 72121 at Gare de l'Est 26 December 2005.
Type and origin
- Power type: Diesel-Electric
- Builder: Alsthom
- Rebuild date: 2002–2004
- Number rebuilt: 30
Specifications
- Configuration
  - UIC: C′C′
- Gauge: 1,435 mm (4 ft 8 1/2 in) standard gauge
- Bogies: Monomotor
- Wheel diameter: 1,140 mm (44.88 in)
- Length: 20,190 mm (66 ft 3 in)
- Loco weight: 105 tonnes (103 long tons; 116 short tons)
- Fuel type: Diesel
- Prime mover: SEMT Pielstick V16-PA-4-V200-VGA
- Traction motors: TAO 656 B1 1215 V
- Transmission: Electric
Performance figures
- Maximum speed: 160 km/h (99 mph)
- Power output: 2,650 kW (3,554 hp)
Career
- Operators: SNCF
- Class: CC 72100
- Number in class: 30
- Numbers: In range 72127 – 72190
- Locale: Paris - Mulhouse

The SNCF Class CC 72100 is a class of C′C′ diesel-electric locomotives rebuilt from CC 72000 locomotives during 2002–2004.

30 locomotives were converted: 21, 30, 37–41, 43, 45, 47, 48, 51, 56–60, 63, 66, 68, 72, 75–80, 82, 86, 89–90. They find use on the Paris - Mulhouse line and are based at Chalindrey.

The CC 72100 class locomotives were withdrawn from service on August 28, 2017, and replaced by the newer Coradia Liner B 85000.
