= SNCF Class CC 72000 =

Class of 92 French 3550hp B′B′ diesel-electric locomotives

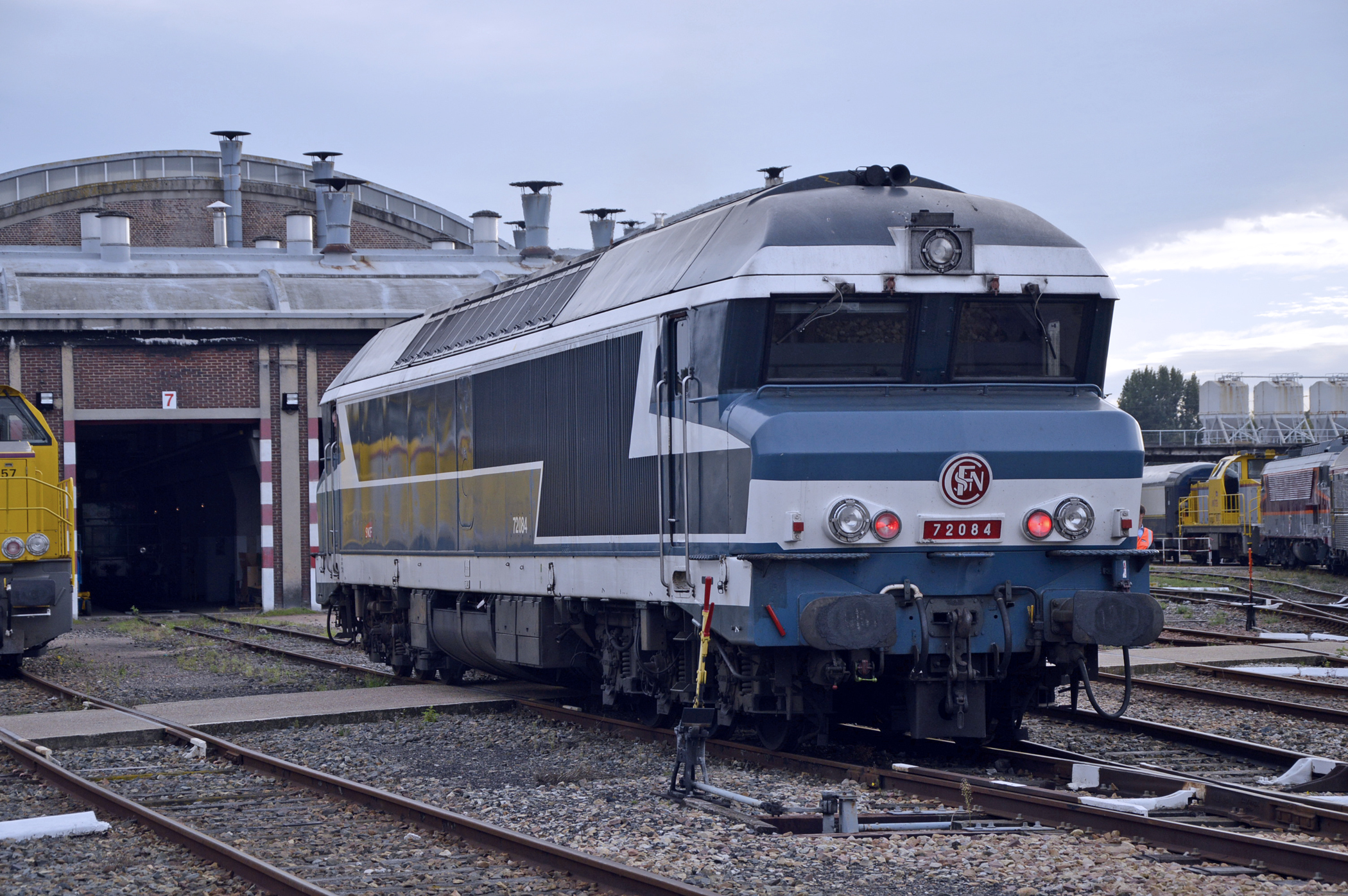
- Preserved CC 72084 at Longueau, on 4 October 2013.
Type and origin
- Power type: Diesel engine
- Builder: Alsthom
- Build date: 1967 - 1974
- Total produced: 92
Specifications
- Configuration
  - UIC: C′C′
- Gauge: 1,435 mm (4 ft 8 1/2 in) standard gauge
- Wheel diameter: 1,140 mm (44.88 in)
- Length: 20.19 m (66 ft 2 7/8 in)
- Loco weight: 114 t (112 long tons; 126 short tons)
- Fuel type: Diesel
- Fuel capacity: 5,500 L (1,200 imp gal; 1,500 US gal)
- Fuel consumption: 3.33 L/km (0.85 mpg_{‑imp}; 0.71 mpg_{‑US})
- Prime mover: SACM AGO V16 ESHR
- Engine type: V16
- Traction motors: Two TAO 656 B1
- Transmission: Electric
- Loco brake: Air
- Train brakes: Air
Performance figures
- Maximum speed: 140 km/h (87 mph) (CC 72001-16, 18-20); 160 km/h (CC 72017, 72021-92)
- Power output: 2,650 kW (3,550 hp); 2,250 kW (continuous)
Career
- Operators: SNCF; ONCF (as its DF 115)
- First run: 1967
- Disposition: 2 preserved, 7 exported to Morocco; 3 in service

The SNCF Class CC 72000 was a class of C′C′ diesel-electric locomotives designed and built by French manufacturing conglomerate Alsthom. They are regarded as being the most powerful class of diesel locomotives to be built in France.

Ninety-two locomotives were produced between 1967 and 1974, numbered CC 72001 to CC 72092. The last regular workings of the type were conducted during August 2019.

== Development and design ==
During the 1960s, French national railway operator SNCF investigated the use of high-power diesel locomotives for heavy express trains on its non-electrified major lines. Following trials of prototype locomotives during the mid-1960s, which were considerably more powerful than any equivalent previously operated by the SNCF, it chose to order 92 locomotives for mixed passenger and high speed freight traffic. Designated CC 72000, the class was a six-axle diesel-electric locomotive.

Each locomotive had one SACM 16 cylinder four-stroke diesel engine of 3,550 horsepower (2,650 KW) driving an alternator whose output was rectified by silicon rectifiers. There were two traction motors, each mounted on a 3-axle monomotor bogie with two-speed gearing. A unique feature of the monomotor design was the choice of two speed settings, which was intended to benefit its dual use on both freight and passenger services; selecting the 85 km/h max speed 'regime marchandises' maximized tractive effort (beneficial when hauling heavy freight trains), while the 140/160 km/h max speed 'regime voyageurs' was suited for higher speed express trains.

The cab design provided enhanced collision protection for its crew, but otherwise followed traditional practices. The exterior of the locomotive originally bore the operator's standard blue and white livery, produced by designer Paul Arzens.

Between 2002 and 2004, 30 were rebuilt with SEMT Pielstick engines, after which they were re-designated as SNCF Class CC 72100. The original power units had been considered to be noisy and smoky, which had led to a ban of the type by Swiss authorities from Basel’s SNCF station in the early-2000s. The rebuilt locomotives are numbers: 21, 30, 37–41, 43, 45, 47, 48, 51, 56–60, 63, 66, 68, 72, 75–80, 82, 86, 89–90.

In addition to the domestic production run, Alsthom marketed the locomotive to the export market. These efforts led to 14 locomotives closely resembling the CC72000 being built for Morocco in 1969, numbering them DF100-114. In 2006, Moroccan operator ONCF procured six redundant CC72000s from SNCF to supplement their existing fleet, renumbering these as DF115-120. In Morocco, they have been operated for freight and passenger services on non-electrified routes.

During the early 1980s, the Portuguese Railways procured a batch of 13 CP Class 1900 and 17 CP Class 1930 locomotives, which had a strong family resemblance to the CC72000. These locomotives were locally manufactured by Sorefame having secured a production license arrangement with Alsthom. The Class 1900s were tasked with heavy freight work, while the slightly faster Class 1930s performed express passenger services.

== Operational history ==
The type was manufactured at Alsthom's works in Belfort, eastern France, between 1967 and 1974. On 20 December 1967, the first CC 72000 was delivered to SNCF. As more examples followed, the locomotive was initially operated upon the main lines to Brittany in the north-west; it soon began to replace both less powerful diesels and many of the remaining express steam locomotives. The type operated services across the national network, including those between Nantes, Bordeaux and Toulouse in the south-west, between Lyon, Mulhouse, Geneva, Annecy and Grenoble in the east; as well as the core Paris to Clermont-Ferrand route. The final unit was delivered on 21 June 1974.

Throughout the 1970s and 1980s, the SNCF continued its policy of railway electrification, which resulted in a gradual but permanent decline in the need for diesel-hauled express passenger services. Accordingly, the CC72000s were often transferred to new areas, as well as being increasingly used for freight traffic. Despite this progression, the type was heavily used well into the 2000s on various lines, including Dijon-Reims, Paris-Laon and Amiens-Calais, for passenger services. After new SNCF Class BB 75000 diesels began arriving in 2006, as well as a general drop in freight traffic around this time, the type began to be permanently withdrawn. By early 2010, only four original CC72000s remained.

Between 1999 and 2005, Nos. CC72061/062/064 were fitted with Scharfenberg couplers, enabling them to haul TGV Atlantique sets along the unelectrified line between Nantes and Les Sables-d’Olonne; this prevented any conventional services being run with these three locomotives as the modification necessitated the removal of their buffers. During August 2019, the CC72000 performed its last regular workings.

== Names ==
Nineteen members of the class were named.

| Number | Name | Number | Name |
|---|---|---|---|
| CC 72001 | Annonay | CC 72056 | La Bourboule |
| CC 72010 | Bourg-Argental | CC 72063 | La Roche-sur-Yon |
| CC 72015 | Paray-le-Monial | CC 72071 | Marseille |
| CC 72022 | Villemomble | CC 72072 | Saint-Malo |
| CC 72024 | Pont-Audemer | CC 72074 | Toulon |
| CC 72026 | Luxeuil-les-Bains | CC 72077 | Noisy-le-Sec |
| CC 72036 | Thann | CC 72080 | Mulhouse |
| CC 72043 | Langres | CC 72082 | Provins |
| CC 72052 | La Baule | CC 72090 | Belfort |
| CC 72053 | Montauban-de-Bretagne | | |

== Preservation ==
CC 72029 is preserved at Cité du Train, Mulhouse.
