= NS Class 1700 =

Class of 81 Netherlands electric locomotives

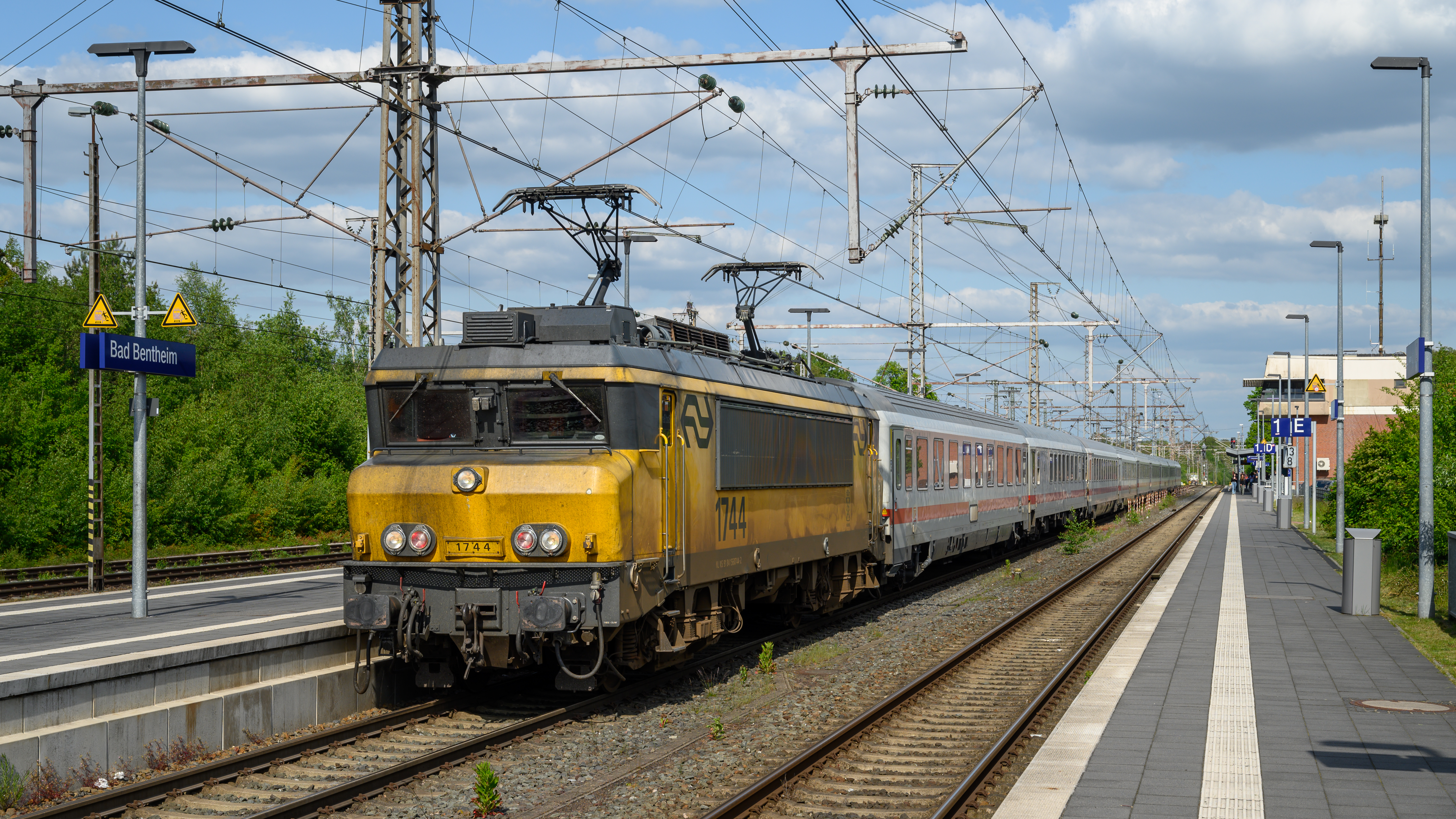
- 1744 at Bad Bentheim station in May 2023
Type and origin
- Power type: Electric 1.5 kV DC OHL
- Builder: GEC-Alsthom
- Build date: 1990-1994
- Total produced: 81
Specifications
- Configuration
  - UIC: B'B'
- Gauge: 1,435 mm (4 ft 8 1/2 in) standard gauge
- Driver dia.: 1,250 mm (49.21 in)
- Length: 17,480 mm (57 ft 4 1/4 in)
- Adhesive weight: 10.375 t (10.211 long tons; 11.436 short tons)
- Loco weight: 83 t (81.7 long tons; 91.5 short tons)
- Electric system/s: 1.5 kV DC Catenary
- Current pickup: Pantograph
- Transmission: 2×Alstom TAB 674 C4 DC Traction motors
- Loco brake
- Train brakes: direct brake, single pipe, e-dynamic brake, e-pneum. brake(?)
- Couplers: BSI-coupler
Performance figures
- Maximum speed: 200 km/h (120 mph) (in practice 160 km/h or 99 mph)
- Power output: 4,600 kW (6,200 hp)
- Tractive effort: 294 kN (66,000 lb_{f})
Career
- Operators: Nederlandse Spoorwegen
- Class: 1700
- Number in class: 81
- Numbers: 1701-1781
- Delivered: 1991-1994
- Current owner: Nederlandse Spoorwegen

The NS Class 1700 is a class of electric locomotives built by Alstom in 1990-1994 for Nederlandse Spoorwegen (NS).

== Description ==
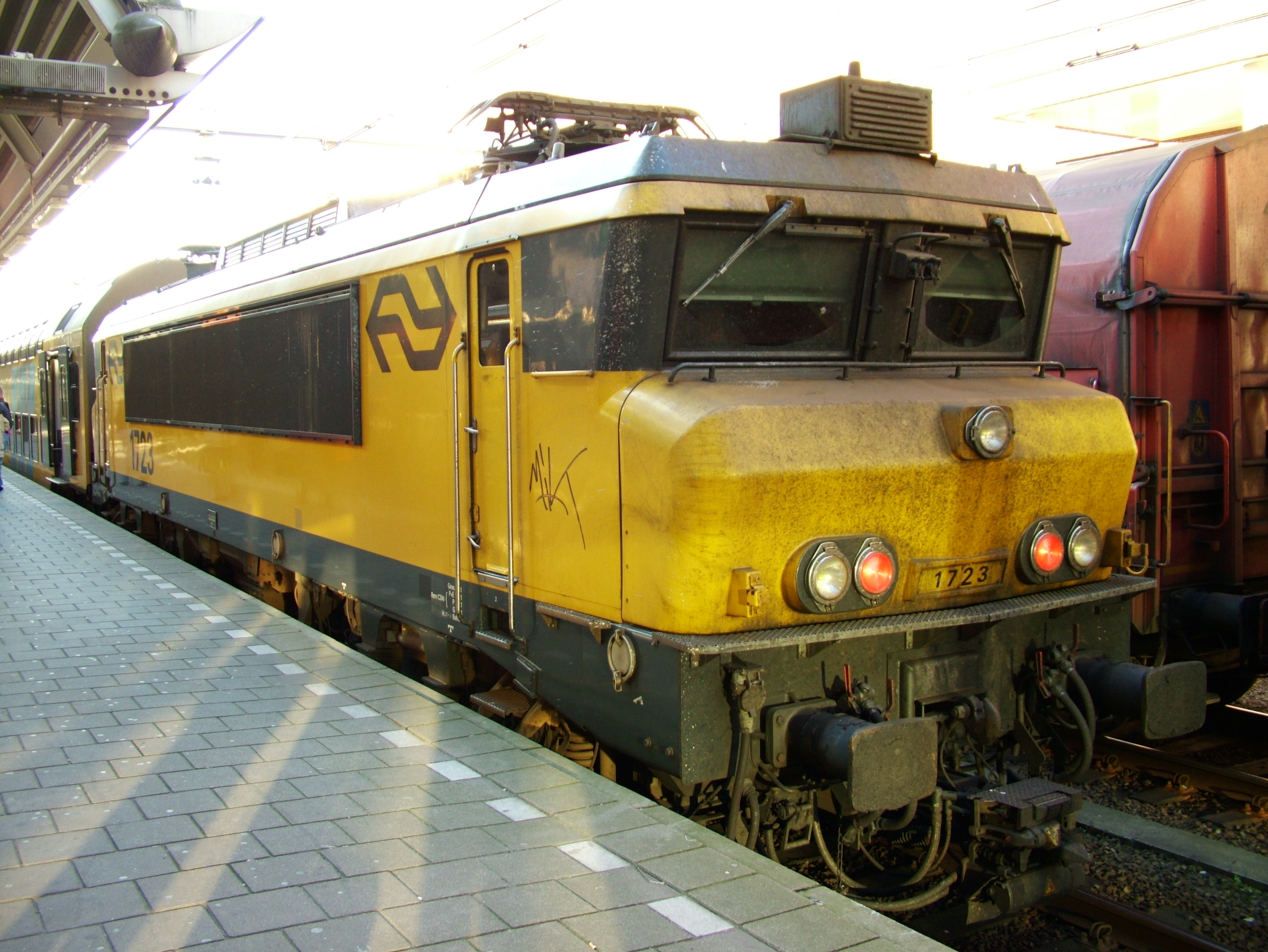
1723 at Amersfoort

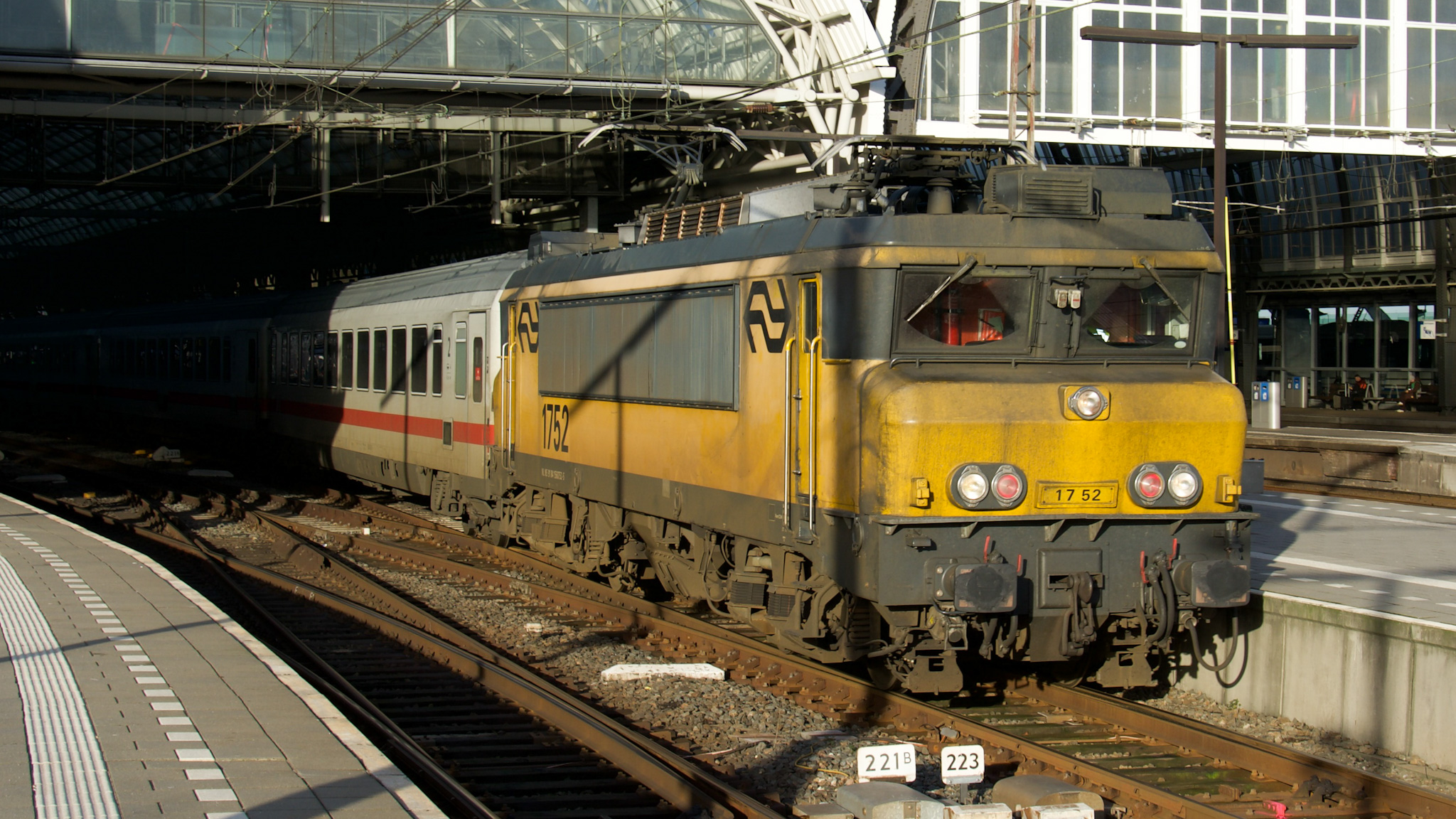
1752 operating on the international service between Amsterdam and Berlin.

The Class 1700 locomotives were built by Alstom in 1990-1994. Eighty-one, numbered 1701-1781, were built.

The Class 1600 was ordered in 1978, after several types of locomotives were tested in the 1970s. One of those was the French Class BB 7200, on which the 1600 is based. The 58 locomotives were delivered between 1981 and 1983. As a result of their delivery, the old Class 1000 and Class 1500 were taken out of service.

Thanks to the electronic power control, these locomotives were the most economical but also the most powerful locomotives that Dutch Railways had.

The Class 1700 are similar but not entirely equal to the Class 1600/1800. The newer 1700 series have updated and extended electronics, a newer safety system (ATB phase 4 vs ATB phase 3 in the 1600 series) and a different braking system. The locomotives are fitted with monomotor bogies.

Most visual difference between the 1700 and 16/1800 series is the automatic coupler on 1701-1728 subseries. These locomotives were used with NS DD-AR double-decker coaches in a push-pull setup and treated as an EMU. The couplers, from BSI (Bergische Stahl Industrie, Germany), allow a mechanical, pneumatic and electrical connection between two DD-AR sets. From the remaining 1729-1781 series a large number are converted to be used in push-pull sets with coaches from the rebuild ICRm series. Several of these coaches have been rebuilt with a drivers cab, allowing the loco to be remotely controlled. When not used in push-pull service, the loco is used in regular trains, available for maintenance or as reserve.

== Fleet list ==
In 2010, the Dutch Railways took a few class 1700 out of service because there wasn't enough work for all locomotives. Number 1735 has been scrapped, due to a devastating fire, which occurred on 24 February 2000 in Venlo. Refurbishment was too expensive, so the locomotive was scrapped in 2002. Some locomotives carry names of towns and cities in the Netherlands, the table below shows which engines. In 2018, 1772, 1775 and 1781 were sold to Railpromo.

- 1701^{t} -
- 1702^{t} -
- 1703^{t} -
- 1704^{t} -
- 1705^{t} - Dalfsen
- 1706^{t} -
- 1707^{t} -
- 1708^{t} -
- 1709^{t} -
- 1710^{t} -
- 1711^{t} - Emmen
- 1712^{t} -
- 1713^{t} -
- 1714^{t} - Veenendaal
- 1715^{t} -
- 1716^{t} -
- 1717^{t} -
- 1718^{t} -
- 1719^{t} - Voorhout
- 1720^{t} - Beilen
- 1721^{t} -
- 1722^{t} -
- 1723^{t} -
- 1724^{t} - Anna Paulowna
- 1725^{t} -
- 1726^{t} -
- 1727^{t} -
- 1728^{t} -
- 1729^{t} -
- 1730 -
- 1731 - Purmerend
- 1732 - Zevenbergen
- 1733 - Boxtel
- 1734^{t} -
- 1735 - Soest † Scrapped after a fire
- 1736 - Gilze en Rijen
- 1737^{t} -
- 1738 - Duivendrecht
- 1739 - Dalen
- 1740 - Baarn
- 1741 - Putten
- 1742 - † Scrapped after a fire
- 1743 - Wolvega
- 1744 - Wijchen
- 1745 -
- 1746 - Castricum
- 1747 - † Scrapped after a fire
- 1748 - 't Harde
- 1749 -
- 1750 -
- 1751 -
- 1752 -
- 1753 -
- 1754 - Diemen
- 1755^{t} -
- 1756 -
- 1757 -
- 1758 -
- 1759 - Best †
- 1760 - Holten
- 1761 -
- 1762 -
- 1763 - †
- 1764 -
- 1765 -
- 1766 -
- 1767 - † Scrapped after a fire
- 1768 - Akkrum
- 1769 -
- 1770^{t} -
- 1771^{t} - Abcoude
- 1772 -
- 1773 - Enkhuizen †
- 1774 - Gramsbergen
- 1775^{t} -
- 1776 -
- 1777 -
- 1778 -
- 1779 -
- 1780 -
- 1781 -
- ^{t} = These engines have been taken out of service and are not expected to return in service in the near future.
- † = This engine has been scrapped
