= SŽ series 363 =

Class of Slovenian electric locomotives

SŽ 363
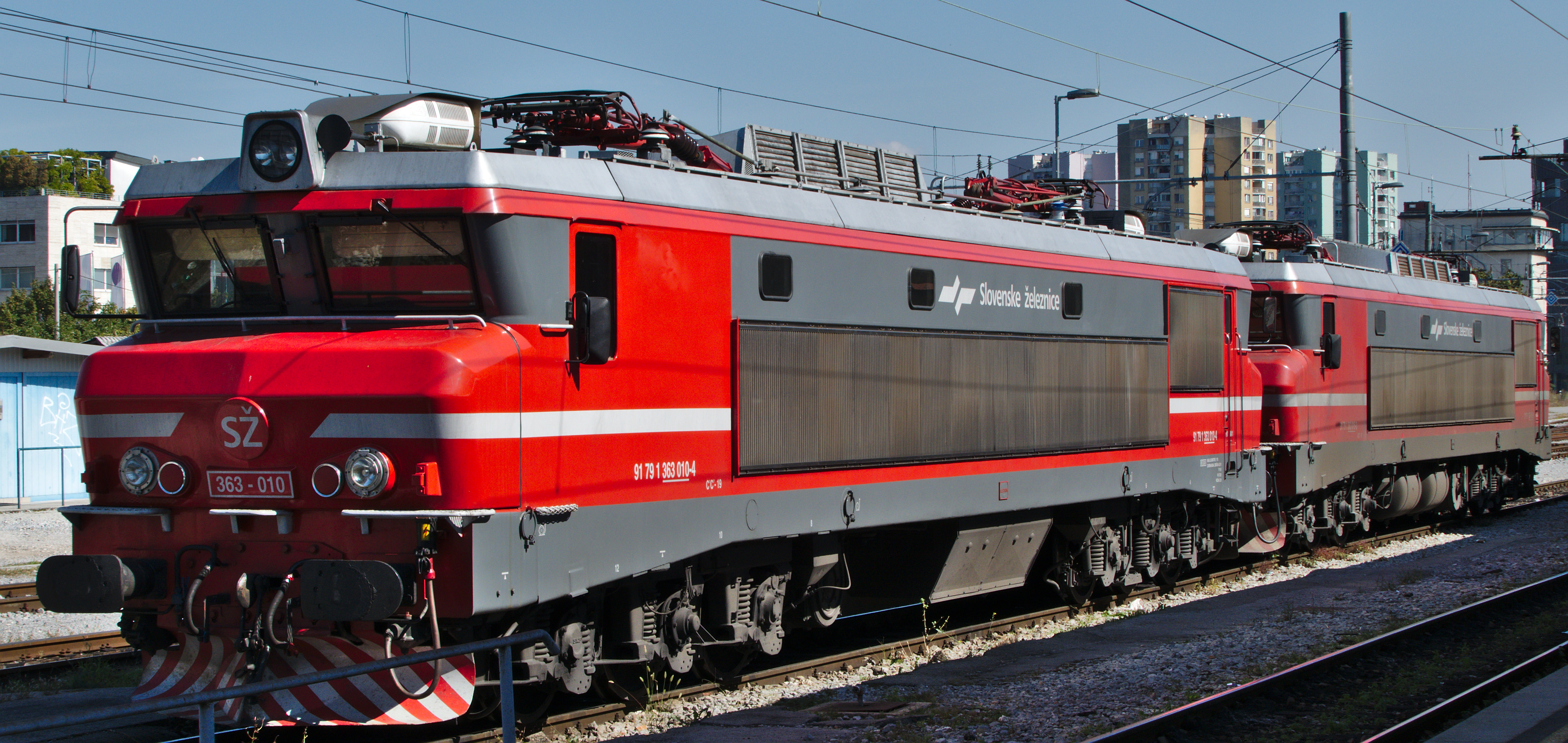
- SŽ series 363 locomotive at Ljubljana railway station
Type and origin
- Power type: Electric
- Builder: Alstom
- Build date: 1975-1977
- Total produced: 39
Specifications
- Configuration
  - UIC: C′C′
- Gauge: 1,435 mm (4 ft 8 1/2 in) standard gauge
- Length: 20.1 m (65 ft 11 in)
- Width: 3.058 m (10 ft 0.4 in)
- Loco weight: 115 tonnes (113.2 long tons; 126.8 short tons)
- Electric system/s: 3000 V DC Catenary
- Current pickup: Pantograph
Performance figures
- Maximum speed: 125 km/h (78 mph)
- Power output: 2,970 kW (3,980 hp)
Career
- Nicknames: Brižita
- Locale: Slovenia

The SŽ series 363 is a class of 3 kV DC electric locomotives operated by Slovenian Railways.

They were built in 1975-1977 by the French manufacturer Alstom. They have a typically Alshom C′C′ wheel arrangement with monomotor bogies. They share their "Nez Cassé" body design with SNCF Class CC 6500 and NS Class 1600, with their electrical system adapted for the Italian-developed 3 kV DC catenary. Their distinctive French styled bodywork led to them acquiring the nickname Brižita after the French actress Brigitte Bardot. Most 363 series locomotives bear the standard red and white livery of SŽ, but 363-005 has been repainted back into the original mustard yellow/brown/green colour scheme.
