= CP Class 1930 =

Class of 17 diesel-electric locomotives that was used by Portuguese Railways

Class 1930
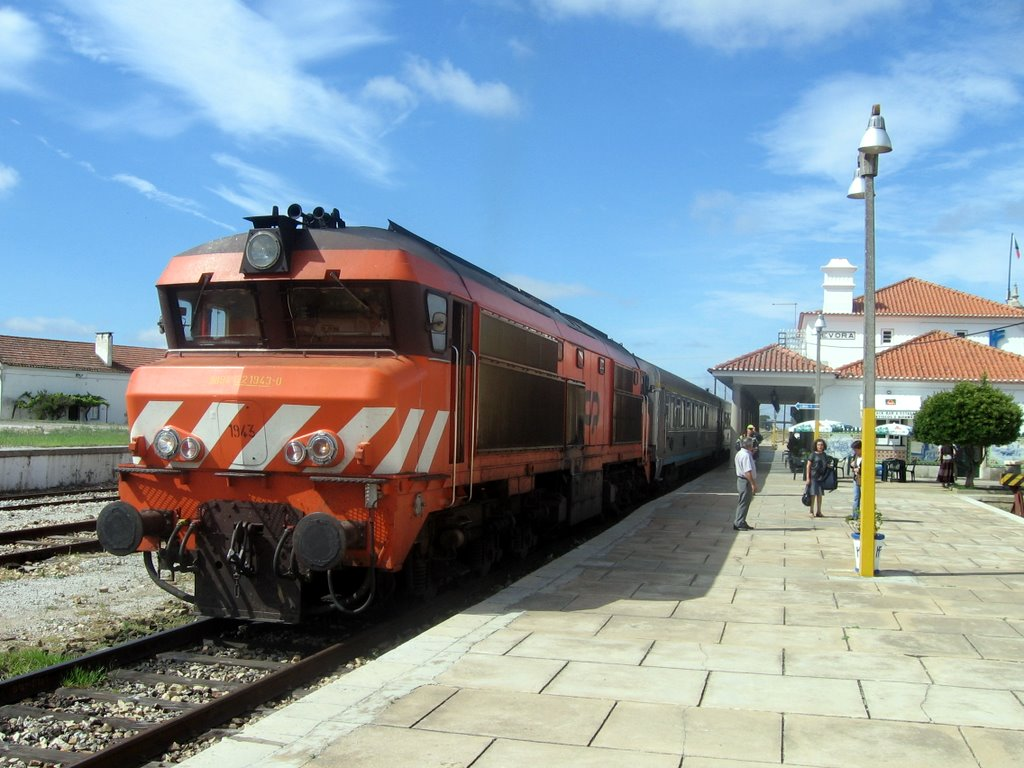
- Locomotive 1943 heading an Inter City passenger train at Évora station (before the electrification of the line)
Type and origin
- Power type: Diesel-electric
- Designer: Alsthom
- Builder: Sorefame
- Build date: 1981
- Number rebuilt: 17
Specifications
- Gauge: 1,668 mm (5 ft 5 21/32 in)
Performance figures
- Maximum speed: 120 km/h (75 mph)
Career
- Operators: Comboios de Portugal
- Class: Série 1930
- Withdrawn: 2018

The Série 1930 are a class of diesel-electric locomotives formerly used by Portuguese Railways (CP). They are visually very similar to the Série 1900 locomotives, but have a higher top speed of 120 km/h. They were assembled in Portugal by Sorefame, under licence from the French company Alstom and entered service in 1981. The final locomotive in service was withdrawn following failure in October 2018.

They are mainly used on passenger train services. When first introduced, they displaced the Série 1800 locomotives from express passenger trains between Barreiro and the Algarve, but their duties have been reduced since the electrification of the main line between Lisbon and Faro, and now also to Évora.
