= SNCF Class BB 7200 =

Class of 240 French electric locomotives

SNCF BB 7200
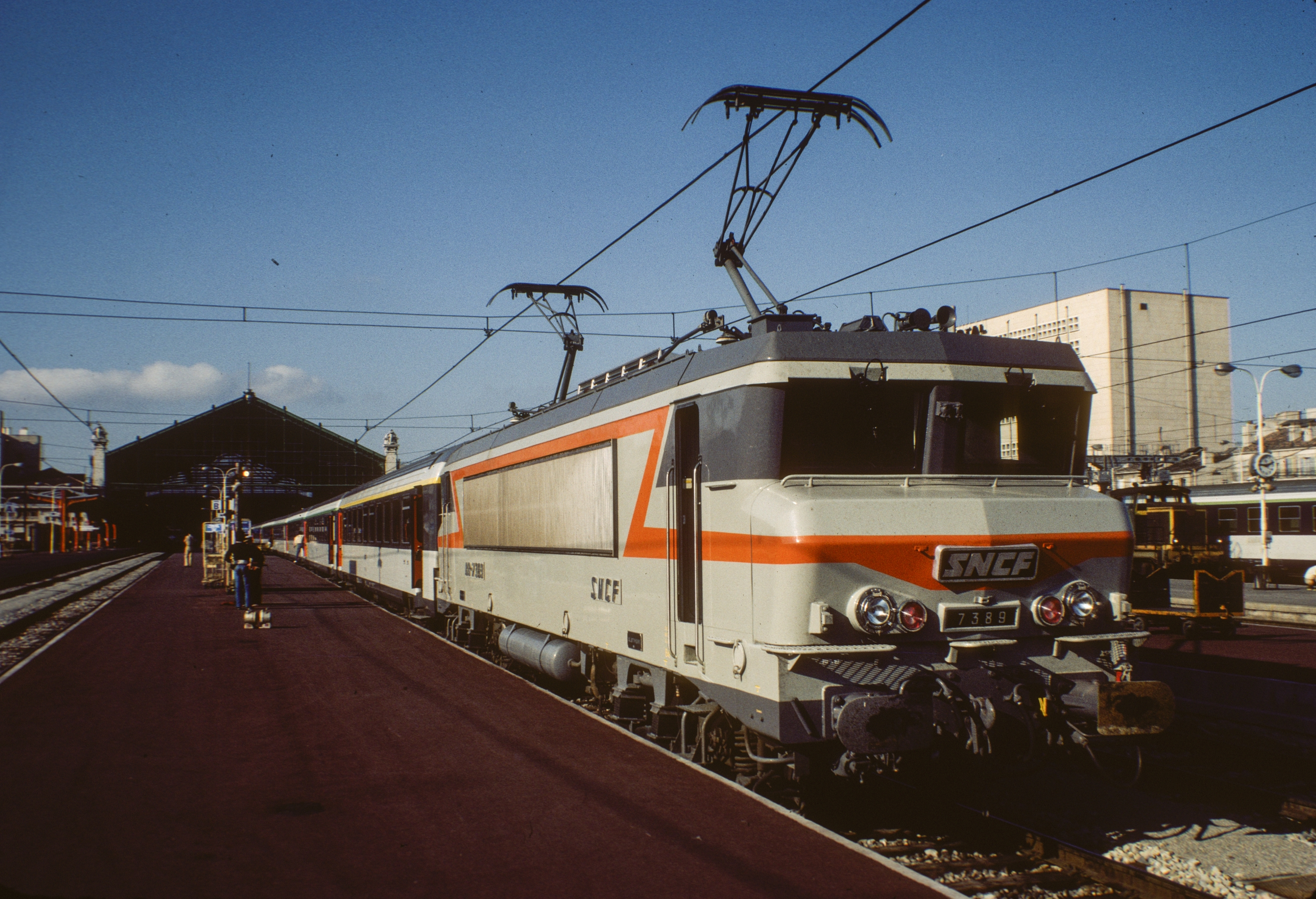
- BB 7389 running passenger service in Marseille, 1982
Type and origin
- Power type: Electric
- Builder: (France) Alsthom (France) MTE
- Build date: 1976-1985
- Total produced: 240
Specifications
- Configuration
  - AAR: B-B
  - UIC: B'B'
- Gauge: 1,435 mm (4 ft 8 1/2 in) standard gauge wheeldiameter = 1,250 mm (49 in)
- Length: 17.48 m (57 ft 4 in)
- Width: 3.053 m (10.02 ft)
- Height: 4.295 m (14.09 ft)
- Loco weight: 89 t (98 short tons)
- Electric system/s: 1.5 kV DC Catenary
- Current pickup(s): Pantograph
- Traction motors: 2x TAB 674 DC
- Transmission: Electric
- Loco brake: Air and Electrical regenerative
- Train brakes: Air
- Safety systems: ETCS
Performance figures
- Maximum speed: 160 km/h (99 mph), 100 km/h (62 mph) (7201 - 7235, 7343 - 7380, 7411 - 7440), 200 km/h (120 mph) (7261 - 7263)
- Power output: 4,040 kW (5,420 hp)
- Tractive effort: 288 kN (65,000 lb_{f}), 300 kN (67,000 lb_{f}) (7201 - 7235, 7261 - 7263, 7343 - 7380, 7411 - 7440)
Career
- Operators: SNCF, SNCF-FRET
- Class: BB 7200
- Number in class: 236 (2008)
- Numbers: 7201-7208, 7211-7307, 7309-7347, 7349-7440
- Locale: Mainly South-East France
- Disposition: in service

The SNCF Class BB 7200 is a 1.5 kV DC electric locomotive operated by the SNCF in France. It is the DC version of the 'Nez Cassé' family of locomotives built between 1976 and 1985 by Alstom. They are rated for 4,040 kW (5,420 hp) of continuous power. SNCF Class BB 15000 is the AC version while the Class BB 22200 is a dual-voltage version. Another relative is the NS Class 1600 operated in the Netherlands, a DC locomotive based on the BB 7200. Intended primarily for passenger service, increasing numbers are being allocated for freight service with lower-geared bogies as passenger services are taken from locomotive-hauled coaches by TGV services. BB 7200 operations are limited to the French 1.5 kV DC electrified network in southeastern France, from Paris southwards. In 2016 48 were allocated to freight, 58 to intercity passenger service, 50 to regional passenger service, and two to auto-train service.

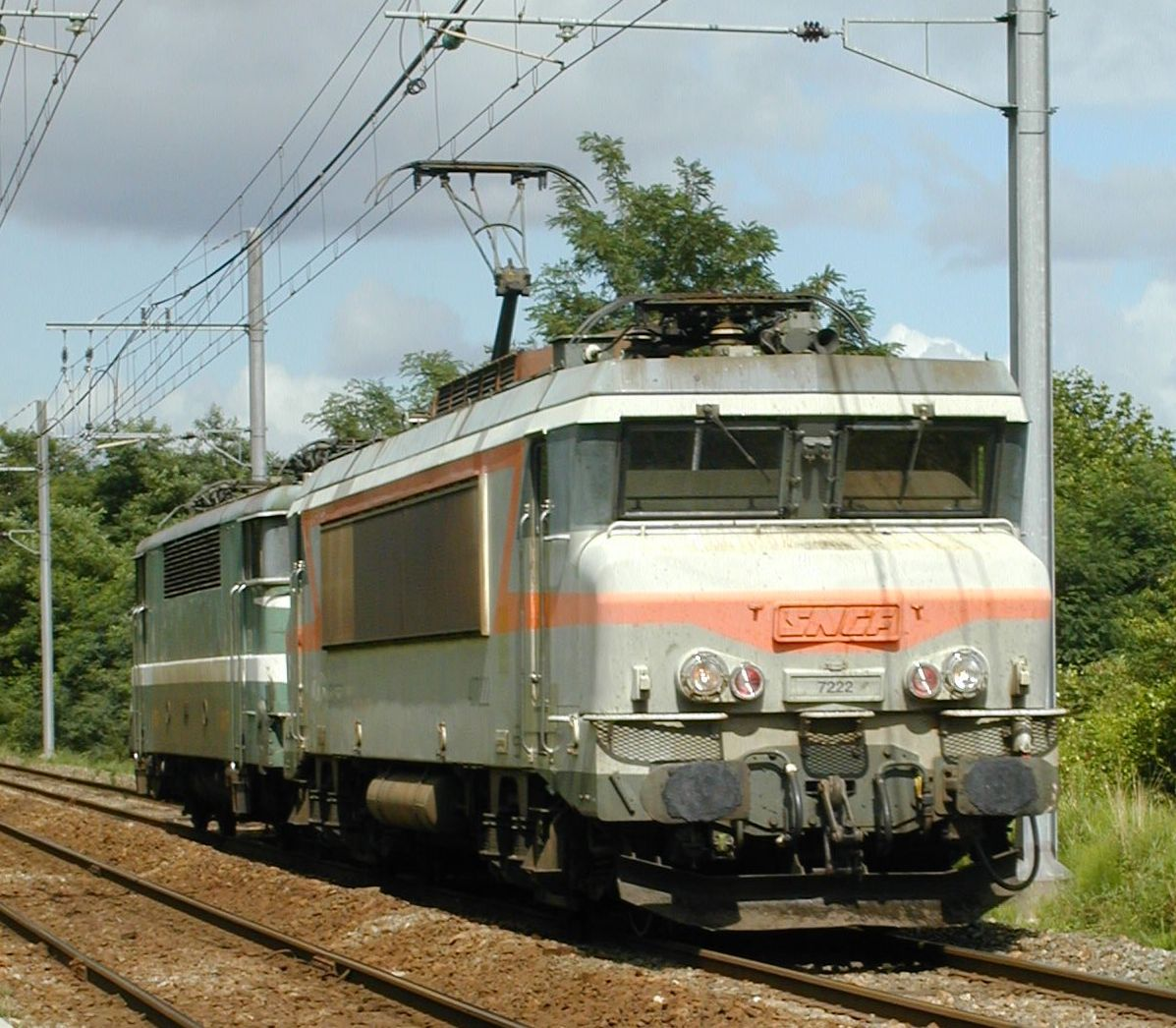
BB 7222 hauling another electric locomotive on 19 August 2002 near Bayonne

7209, 7210, 7308 and 7348 have all been destroyed in accidents. The class was originally numbered 7201 - 7440. Some have cast plates. 7411-7440 are fitted with regenerative brakes for use on the steep Maurienne line in the Alps.

Fourteen locomotives numbered 7311, 7312, 7314, 7325, 7326, 7327, 7330, 7331, 7332, 7335, 7337, 7339, 7341 and 7342 were modified for push-pull operation and become BB 7600 locomotives, to be operated on Transilien Line N.

== Names ==
Some of the class carry the name of a city in France:

Number	City
7203	Saint-Flour
7221	Saint-Amand-Montrond
7223	La Souterraine
7232	Souillac
7236	Chambéry
7237	Pierrelatte
7238	Thonon-les-Bains
7239	Saint-Pierre-d'Albigny
7240	Saint-Étienne
7241	Villeurbanne
7242	Vienne
7243	Villeneuve-Saint-Georges
7244	Vernou-la-Celle-sur-Seine
7253	Montréjeau
7256	Valenton
7270	Entraigues-sur-Sorgues
7410	Fontenay-sous-Bois
7411	Lamure-sur-Azergues

== Models ==
- This locomotive was reproduced in H0 scale by Jouef, Lima, Märklin and Roco.
- This locomotive was reproduced in N scale by Fleischmann and Minitrix.
