= SNCF Class CC 21000 =

Class of 4 French dual-voltage electric locomotives

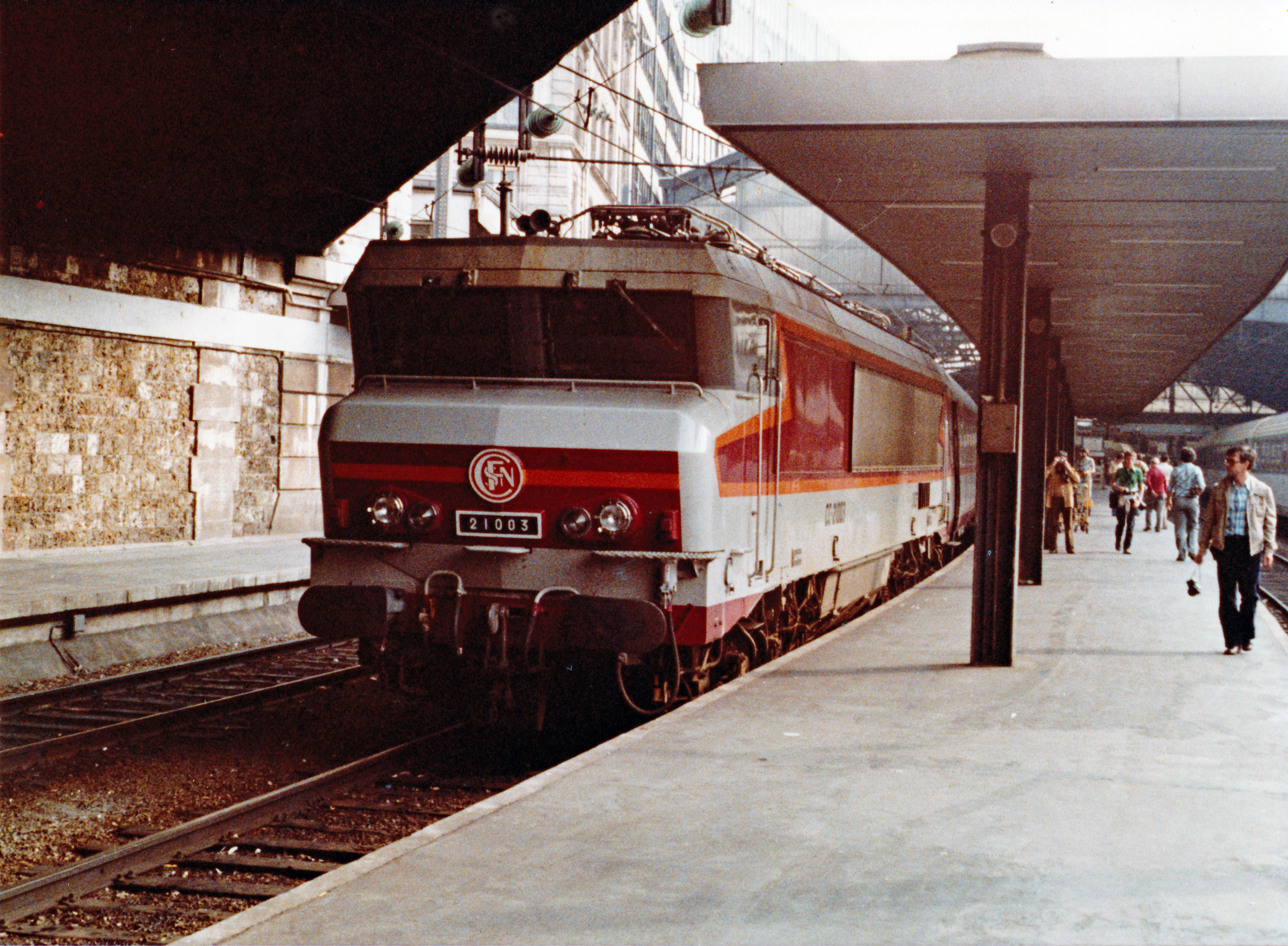
- CC 21003 at Gare Saint-Lazare
Type and origin
- Power type: Electric
- Builder: Alsthom/MTE
- Build date: 1969; 1974
- Total produced: 4
- Rebuild date: 1995–1996
- Number rebuilt: 4
Specifications
- Configuration
  - AAR: C–C
  - Commonwealth: Co-Co
- Gauge: 1,435 mm (4 ft 8 1/2 in) standard gauge
- Bogies: 2
- Wheel diameter: 1,140 mm (45 in)
- Length: 20.19 m (66.2 ft)
- Loco weight: 124 t (122 long tons; 137 short tons); 128 t (126 long tons; 141 short tons)
- Power supply: 1500 V DC/25 kV AC
- Electric system/s: Catenary
- Current pickup: Pantograph
Performance figures
- Maximum speed: 100 km/h (62 mph); 200 km/h (120 mph)
- Power output
  - 1 hour: 5,900 kW (7,900 hp)
- Tractive effort: 288 kN (65,000 lb_{f}); 131 kN (29,000 lb_{f})
Career
- Operators: SNCF; Amtrak
- Class: CC 21000
- Numbers: CC 21001–CC 21004; X996
- Nicknames: Nez Cassés

The CC 21000 was a class of electric locomotives in service with the French railways SNCF, built by Alsthom in 1969 and 1974. It was a dual voltage version of the CC 6500 class working off both 1500 V DC and 25 kV 50 Hz AC. Initially allocated to Dijon, the first two, CC 21001 and CC21002, were fitted with cab signalling to allow them to operate test trains on the new high speed lines.

== Amtrak ==
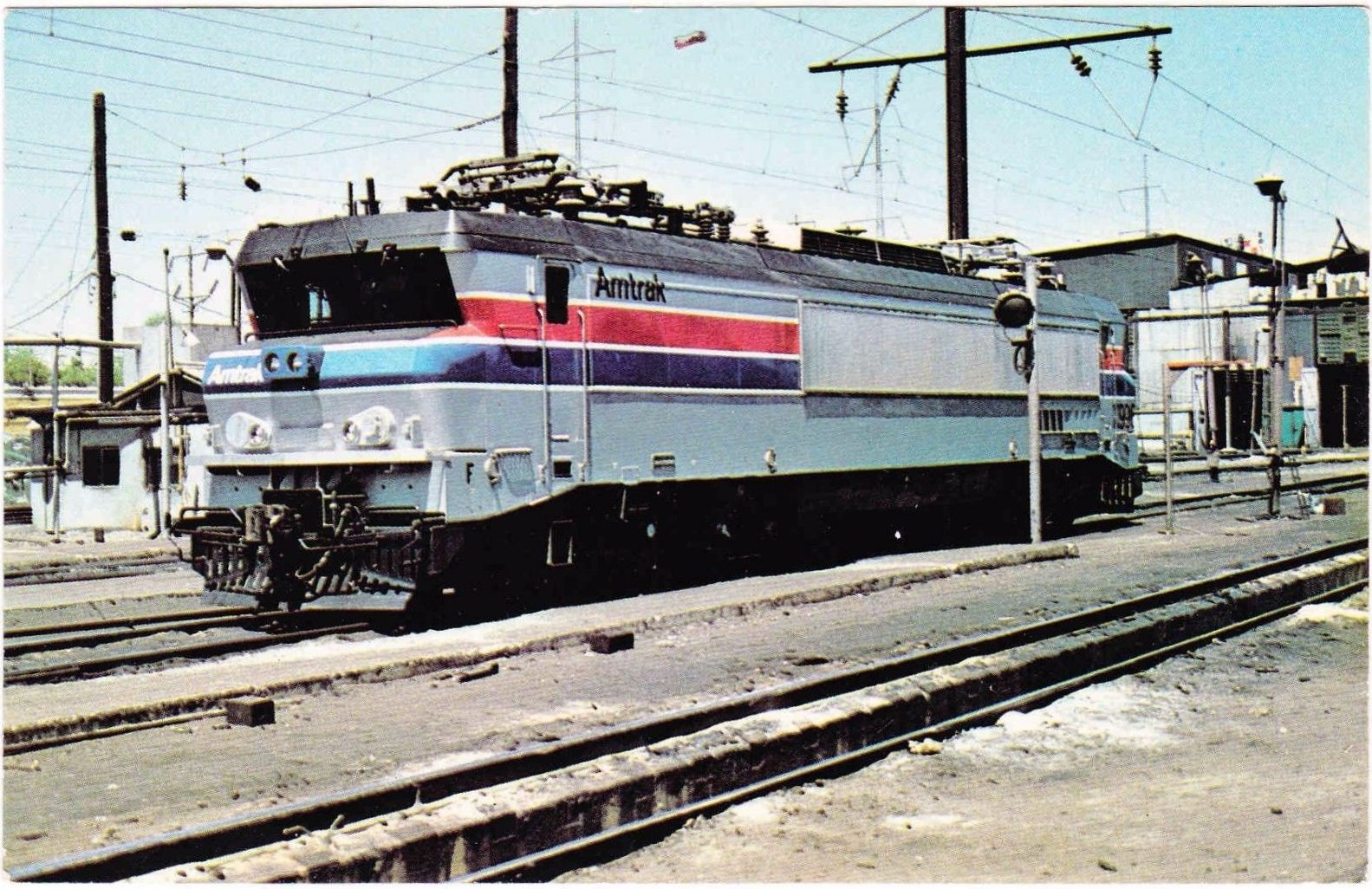
Amtrak X996 at Wilmington in May 1977

In 1977, Amtrak borrowed SNCF CC21003 for testing purposes. This engine was rebuilt by Alstom with its transformer and electrical components replaced with those compatible with Amtrak's 25 Hz traction power system, taller pantographs, Amtrak's cab signaling system, US style couplers, a bell, and other components required by the AAR for operation on US railroads, including a Nathan P01235 air horn used on the more well known E60s. This engine and a Swedish SJ Rc4 were imported and tested by Amtrak to determine the best design to replace the aging PRR GG1's operating on their Northeast Corridor. They were numbered by Amtrak as X996 and X995 respectively. However, the X996's suspension system proved unsuitable for the relatively rough US track construction, and despite modifications made over the course of testing, the engine's performance was deemed unsatisfactory for Amtrak's use. Thus, Amtrak favored the Rc4 design, which would serve as the basis for their EMD AEM-7. After testing was completed, X996 was returned to France, reverted to its pre-Amtrak appearance and specifications, and continued to operate on the SNCF until withdrawn and scrapped in 2005.

== Disposal ==
The CC 21000's were rebuilt into class CC 6500 in 1995 and 1996, taking the numbers CC 6575–CC 6578. All were withdrawn by 2005. CC 6575 (Formerly 21001) is preserved on static display at the SNCF Nimes Depot in Nîmes, Languedoc-Roussillon, France, approximately 45.6km Northeast from Montpellier, France.
