= CP Class 1900 =

Class 1900
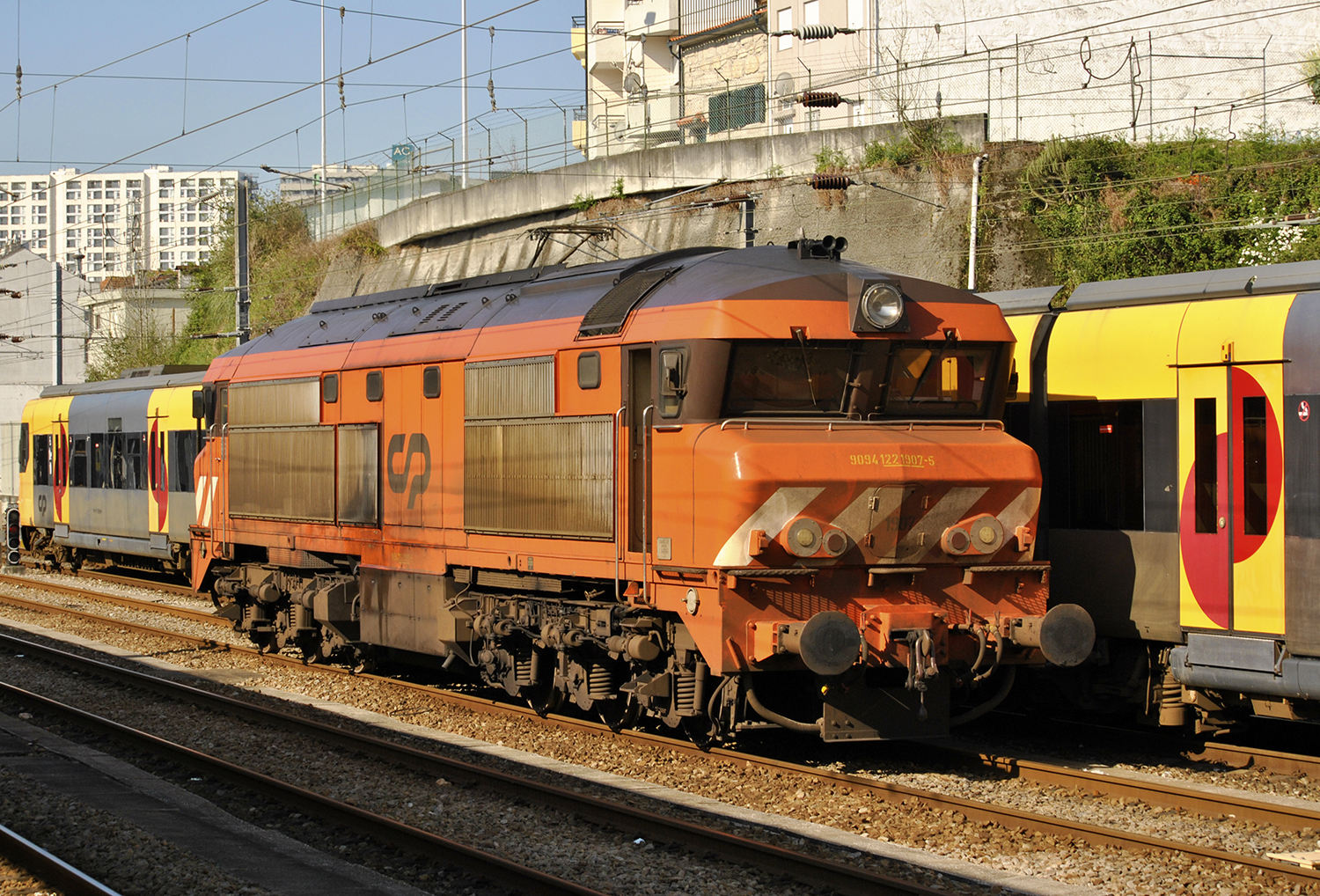
- Locomotive number 1907 in 2013
Type and origin
- Designer: Alsthom
- Builder: Sorefame
- Build date: 1981
- Number rebuilt: 13
Specifications
- Gauge: 1,668 mm (5 ft 5 21/32 in)
Performance figures
- Maximum speed: 100 km/h (62 mph)
Career
- Operators: Comboios de Portugal
- Class: Série 1900
- Locale: Portugal

The Série 1900 locomotives of Portuguese Railways are 13 diesel-electric locomotives built in 1981 for freight duties. Prior to electrification, coal trains were hauled by triple-headed Série 1900 locomotives inland from the Port of Sines. The locomotives were built by Sorefame under licence from the French company Alsthom and are visually similar to SNCF Class CC 72000. They have a top speed of 100 km/h (62 mph).

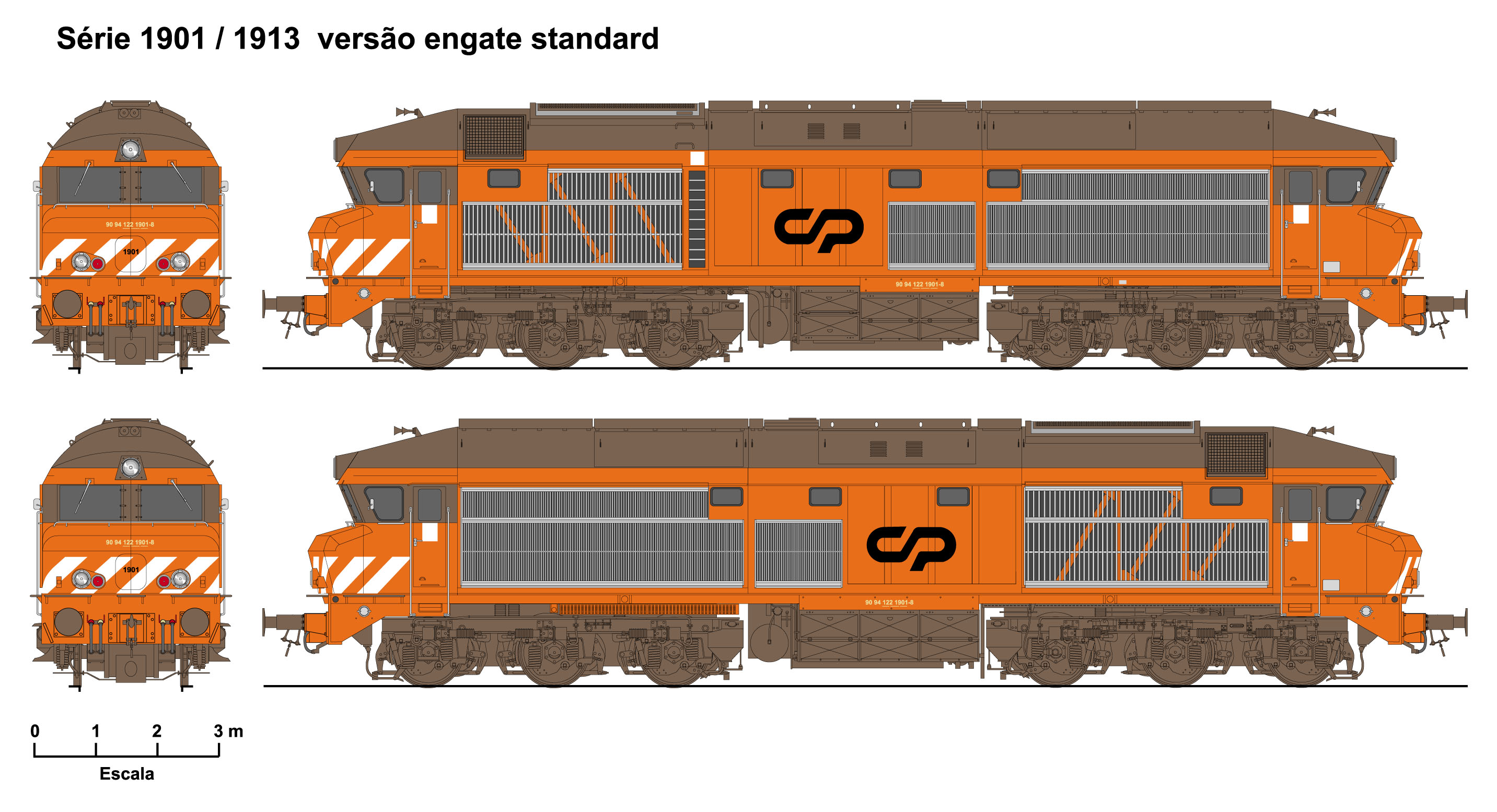
line diagram of CP Class 1900 locomotives
