= NS Class 1600 =

Class of Netherlands electric locomotives

NS Class 1600 NS Class 1800
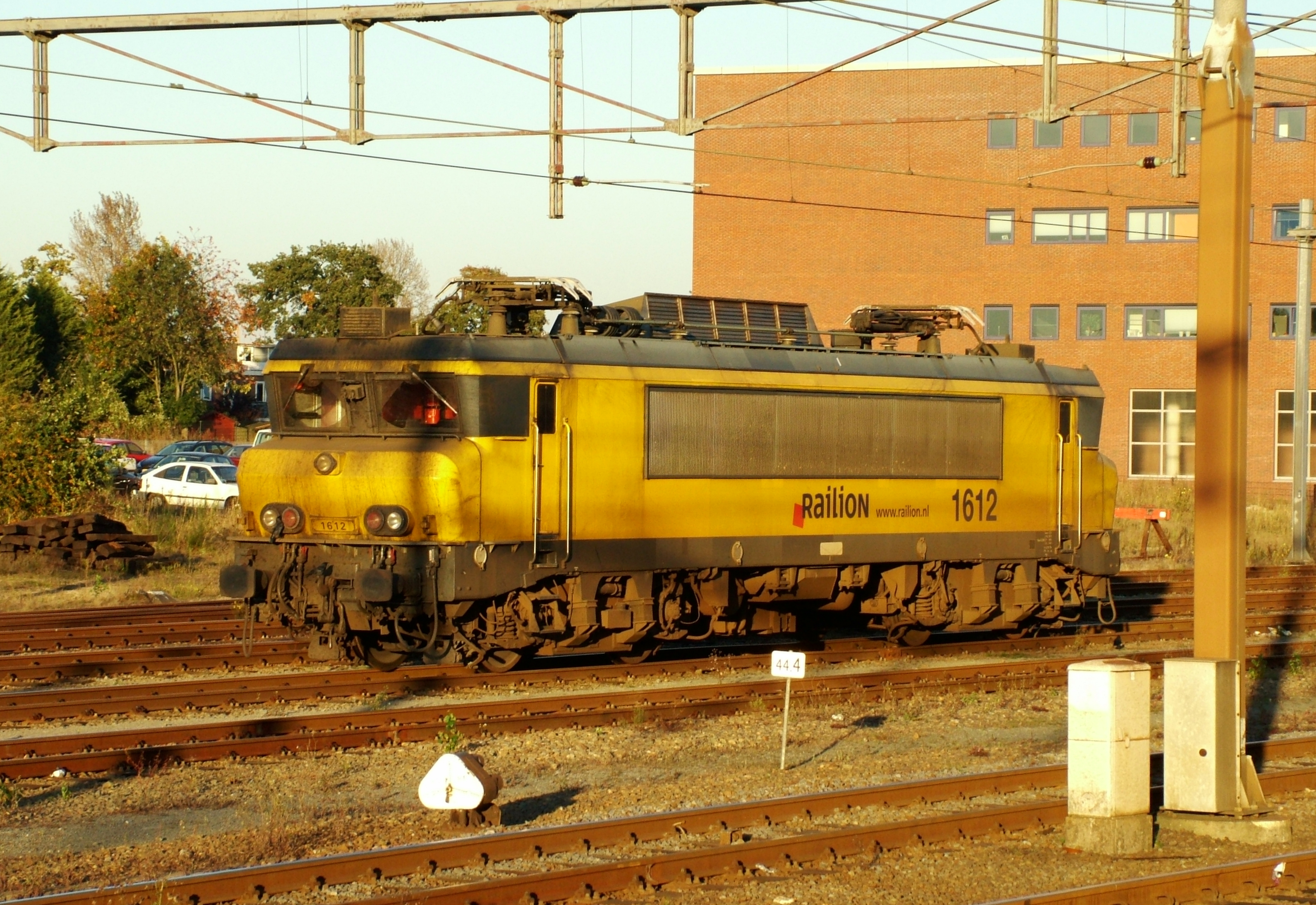
- Railion 1612 at Amersfoort
Type and origin
- Power type: Electric
- Builder: Alsthom-Atlantique, MTE Creusot-Loire
- Build date: 1981-1983
- Total produced: 58
Specifications
- Configuration
  - UIC: B′B′
- Gauge: 1,435 mm (4 ft 8 1/2 in) standard gauge
- Length: 17,600 mm (57 ft 8 7/8 in)
- Loco weight: 83 t (82 long tons; 91 short tons)
- Electric system/s: 1.5 kv DC Catenary
- Current pickup: Pantograph
- Loco brake: Railway air brake
- Train brakes: Railway air brake
Performance figures
- Maximum speed: 200 km/h (120 mph) (in practice 160 km/h or 99 mph)
- Power output: 4,600 kW (6,200 hp)
- Tractive effort: 294 kN (66,000 lb_{f})
Career
- Operators: Railion Nederland, NS Reizigers
- Class: 1600/1800
- Number in class: 1600=23, 1800=34
- Numbers: In the ranges 1601-1622, 1823-1824, 1625, 1826-1858
- Disposition: Active

The NS Class 1600 is a type of B′B′ electric locomotive built by Alstom between 1980 and 1983 based on the SNCF Class BB 7200, and in use by Nederlandse Spoorwegen. They were styled by the French industrial designer Paul Arzens.

The Class 1600 was ordered in 1978, after several types of locomotives were tested in the 1970s. One of those was the SNCF BB 7200, on which the 1600 is based. Forty-eight 1600s were delivered in 1980 followed by a further 10 between 1981 and 1983, the latter being fitted with push pull equipment for use with DDM-1 double deck carriages.

As a result of their delivery, the old Class 1000 and Class 1500 units were taken out of service.

Thanks to the electronic power control, these locomotives were not only the most economical but also the most powerful locomotives that Dutch Railways had.

== NS/Railion Class 1600 ==
In 1999 the freight division of NS, NS Cargo, was sold to Deutsche Bahn became part of Railion as Railion Nederland. The locomotives that became the property of Railion kept their old number (1601–1637). No. 1637 was repainted red as an advertisement for the Dutch brewery Heineken and was repainted in NS yellow in 2004. In 2000, NS Reiziger acquired 1634 to 1637 from Railion.

Currently, Railion Nederland is looking to replace the Class 1600 locomotives with new multi-current locomotives type BR 189 from Germany. In early 2008 these started running into the Netherlands from Germany.

== NS Class 1800 ==
The locomotives that went to NS-Reizigers (1638–1658) had their numbers raised by 200, thus keeping their number but now in the 1800 series. In later years 10 more of the 1600 locomotives were sold to NS-Reizigers and subsequently renumbered to the 1800 series. The 1800 series was now 1823, 1824 and 1826 to 1858. Retaining the last 2 digits of their number. No. 1838 was involved in a heavy but non-fatal train crash at Amsterdam Central Station in 2005 and due to the extensive damage later scrapped. In 2014 ten (1824, 1827, 1828, 1829, 1830, 1831, 1833, 1834, 1836 and 1837) were sold to Locon.

== Names ==
All the 1600s and 1800s carry names and crests of Dutch towns and cities.

- 1601^{t} - Amsterdam
- 1602 - Schiphol
- 1603^{t} - Zutphen †
- 1604 - Dordrecht
- 1605 - Breda †
- 1606^{a} - Harderwijk
- 1607^{t} - Vlissingen †
- 1608^{t} - 's-Hertogenbosch †
- 1609^{a} - Hoofddorp
- 1610^{sp} - Hengelo †
- 1611 - Venlo
- 1612 - Goes
- 1613 - Roermond
- 1614 - Schiedam
- 1615 - Zandvoort
- 1616 - Oldenzaal
- 1617^{t} - Assen †
- 1618^{t} - Almelo
- 1619^{a} - Maastricht
- 1620^{t} - Arnhem †
- 1621^{a} - Deventer
- 1622 - Haarlem †
- 1823^{t} - Hilversum
- 1824^{t} - Alkmaar
- 1625 - Sittard †
- 1826 - Meppel †
- 1827^{l} - Gouda
- 1828^{t} - Apeldoorn
- 1829^{t} - Ede
- 1830^{t} - Zwolle
- 1831^{l} - Voorburg
- 1832^{HSL} - Nijmegen
- 1833^{t} - Bergen op Zoom
- 1834^{l} - Lelystad
- 1835^{h} - Enschede
- 1836^{l} - Heerenveen
- 1837^{t} - Amersfoort
- 1838 - Groningen †
- 1839^{t} - Leiden †
- 1840^{t} - Steenwijk
- 1841 - Almere †
- 1842^{t} - Weert †
- 1843^{t} - Heerlen †
- 1844^{t} - Roosendaal †
- 1845^{t} - Middelburg †
- 1846^{t} - Leeuwarden †
- 1847^{t} - Delft †
- 1848^{t} - Valkenburg †
- 1849^{t} - Oss †
- 1850^{t} - The Hague †
- 1851^{t} - Tilburg †
- 1852 - Utrecht †
- 1853^{t} - Den Helder †
- 1854^{t} - Geleen †
- 1855^{t} - Eindhoven †
- 1856^{m} - Hoogeveen
- 1857^{t} - Rotterdam †
- 1858^{t} - Zaandam †
- ^{a} = These engines have been sold to Husa Transportation - Railway Services Nederland BV.
- ^{l} = These engines have been sold to Locon Benelux.
- ^{h} = This engine is on hire to the Bentheimer Eisenbahn AG.
- ^{sp} = Engine sold for spare parts to Shunter (maintenance company).
- ^{t} = These engines have been taken out of service and are not expected to return in service in the near future.
- † = These engines have been scrapped, due to an accident or because they were taken out of service.
- ^{m} = This engine is now part of the Railway Collection from the Railway Museum in Utrecht.

== See also ==
Class 1700, similar to the 1600/1800 class. Some of the Class 1700 have automatic couplers (so they can quickly couple the NS DD-AR double-decker trains they are used for), which is missing on the 1600/1800 (which have never been used for these trains). The Class 1700 is a modernised version, is heavier than the 1600/1800, and has different (i.e. more modern) systems for braking and "Automatische Trein Beinvloeding ATB" (Automatic Train Control).
