= Sorefame =

Portuguese railway rolling stock and industrial equipment manufacturer

Coordinates: 38.75332°N 9.22281°W

- Logo embedded on a locomotive.
- Type: S.A.
- Industry: Metalworking
- Founded: 23 July 1943
- Founder: Ángelo Fortes
- Defunct: 2005; 21 years ago (rolling stock division)
- Fate: Split into two companies Nova Sorefame and Hidrosorefame, Sorefame factory in Amadora closed 2005
- Headquarters: Portugal
- Area served: Worldwide
- Products: Railway rolling stock Hydro-electric dam equipment

Sorefame (an abbreviation of Sociedades Reunidas de Fabricações Metálicas, meaning "Reunited Society of Metalwork Fabrications" or United Metal Manufacturing Companies) was a Portuguese manufacturer of railway rolling stock and industrial equipment, such as dam gates equipment. It was an iconic Portuguese metalworking company.

Established in 1943, the company was in the 1990s split into a rolling stock company, Nova Sorefame, and a dam equipment company, Hidrosorefame. Nova Sorefame became part of ABB's rail transport division, later Adtranz, and in 2001 part of Bombardier transportation and was closed in 2005. Hidrosorefame was acquired by Alstom.

== Company history ==
Sorefame, founded in 1943, initially manufactured equipment for dams, including the Castelo de Bode and Belver projects. Later, it also produced metal structures, equipment for the energy, chemical, and oil industries, and components for major public works. It was capitalised using state funds but run as a private business. The company had two main product lines: railway equipment such as rolling stock, and equipment for hydro-electric reservoirs, such as dam gates.

Starting in the 1950s, Sorefame began manufacturing rolling stock for the then CP — Caminhos de Ferro Portugueses (Portuguese Railways). Its production lines turned out locomotives, diesel and electric multiple units, passenger coaches, baggage cars, and freight wagons. The company also supplied the Lisbon Metro, the Porto Metro, the Cascais Line, and railway operators in Portuguese-speaking African countries. Sorefame also participated in landmark projects such as the 25 de Abril Bridge and the Cahora Bassa project in Mozambique. In the 1990s, the company came under the control of the Swiss firm ABB and was involved in producing trains for Fertagus, new trains for the Sintra Line, and CP’s Alfa Pendular tilting trains. In the early 21st century, ABB sold its stake to the Canadian company Bombardier, which ultimately closed the Amadora plant in 2004.

In 1987, Sorefame underwent restructuring with MOMPOR to form a new company Sociedade de Montagens Metalomecânicas (SMM). In 1990, SMM merged with Sorefame, MAGUE and SEPSA resulting to form Grupo SENETE in which ABB Group had a 40% share.

In the 1990s, the company was split into two entities: a rolling stock company and the dam equipment company Hidro-sorefame. By 1994, ABB had a 70% share of SENETE, and the following year, Hidro-Sorefame became ABB-hidro. SENETE was fully acquired by ABB in 1997, and in 1999, ABB's power business included a power generation joint venture with Alstom: ABB ALSTOM POWER. In 2000, Alstom acquired ABB's stake in the joint venture, with the former 'Hidro-sorefame' still as a subentity of the firm.

ABB merged its rail transportation division with that of Daimler-Benz to form Adtranz and divested itself of the interest in 1999. Adtranz was eventually sold to Bombardier Transportation, which became the owner of the manufacturing facility in Amadora. Under ABB and later Adtranz and Bombardier, the rolling stock company became increasing an assembly plant, resulting in loss of many jobs.

In 2001, during Bombardier's restructuring after the acquisition of Adtranz, the plant in Amadora was decided to be one of Bombardier's last seven manufacturing plants in Europe, and it would also be used for assembly if there was undercapacity elsewhere. The limited demand and the overcapacity in rolling stock manufacturing capacity across Europe resulted in the closure of the Sorefame railway factory in 2004.

In 2005, part the Amadora plant was expropriated by Refer, with Bombardier being offered approximately €7million for less than half of the site; the site was to be used for training and development of railway related skills and technology, and the expropriation was justified as being in the public interest. In 2008, the land formally became the property of Comboios de Portugal (CP), to be occupied by CP subsidiary EMEF (Empresa de Manutenção de Equipamento Ferroviário) The remainder of the site was sold to the glass container manufacturer Sotancro. An investment of €500 million is expected to re-establish a rail vehicle business in Portugal, to be built in Médio Tejo.

Sorefame’s closure marked the end of over six decades of domestic railway equipment production and left Portugal without the industrial capacity to manufacture locomotives and rolling stock. Among the company's final projects were trainsets for the Porto Metro and electric suburban trains for the Northern region. At the time, the closure was viewed by many observers as the loss of a strategic industrial sector.

Later announced, Portugal is set to resume train manufacturing, nearly 25 years after the closure of the historic Sorefame plant in Amadora, a facility that for decades symbolized the nation's industrial capacity in the railway sector.

== Products ==
=== Railway rolling stock ===
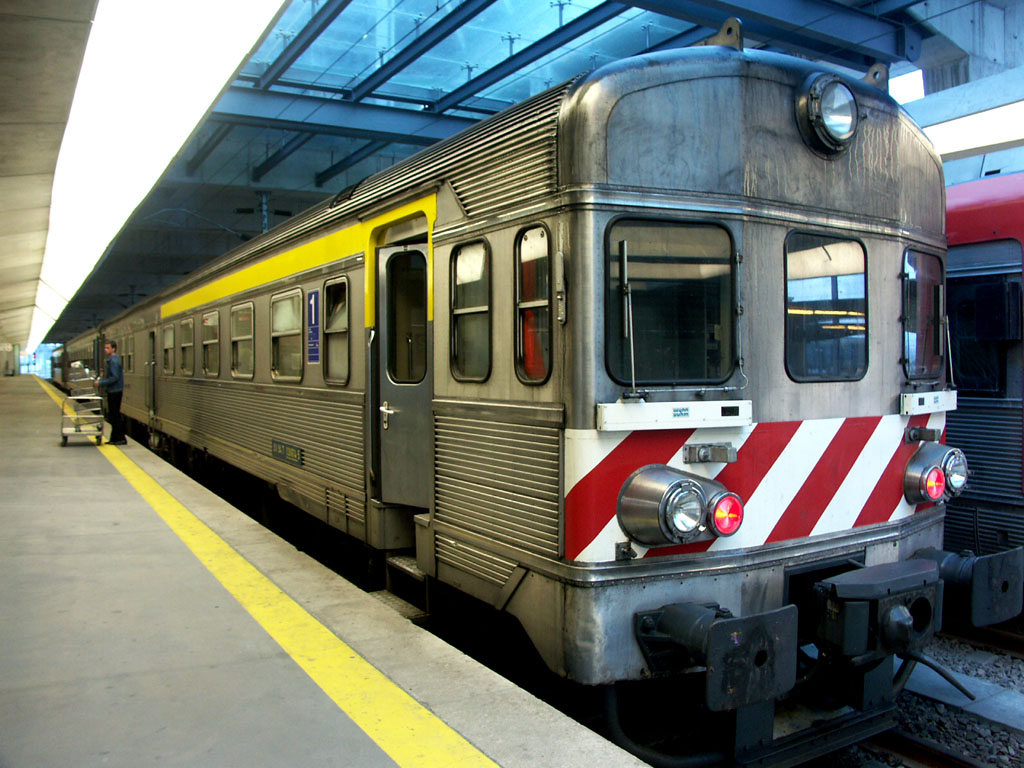
Stainless steel diesel railcar 0614, built by Sorefame, at Porto Campanhã station.

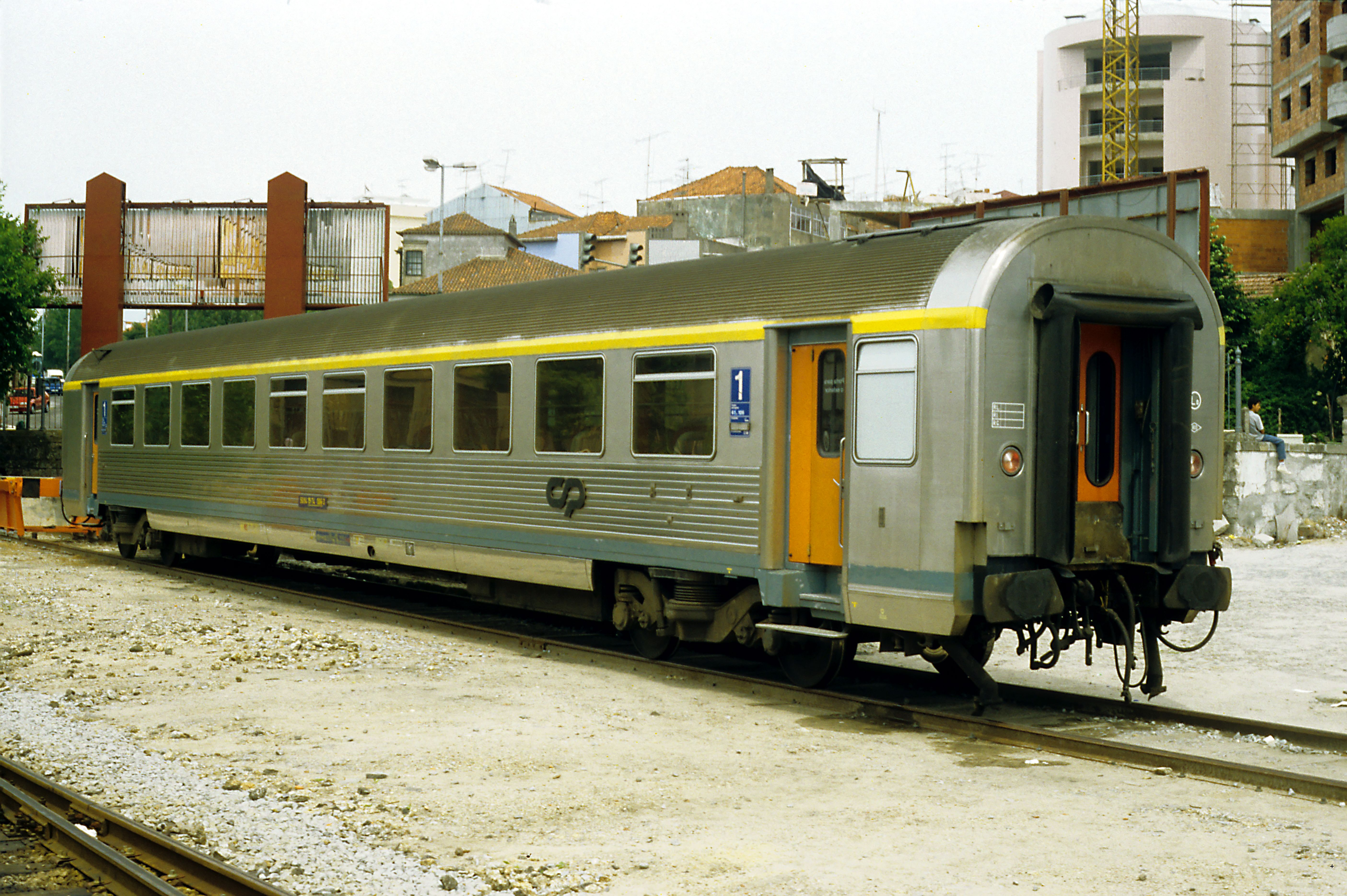
A Sorefame-built carriage based on the French Corail design, at Braga

From the 1960s, the company specialised in the manufacture of stainless steel carriages, principally for the Portuguese Railways (CP), but also for the Lisbon Metro (ML). The stainless steel carriages were built at the company's factory in Amadora under licence from the Budd Company of the US. During the years of the Salazar regime (the Estado Novo), Sorefame supplied the vast majority of Portugal's railway rolling stock (as well as for Portugal's colonies), but the Carnation Revolution of 1974 and economic liberalisation, especially following Portugal's entry to the European Union in 1986, resulted in far greater international competition. Sorefame also assembled diesel and electric locomotives for CP (such as the Série 1900 in 1981), notably using components designed and supplied by the French company Alstom.

The firm had also made shells for American rapid transit rolling stock, most notably for Boeing Vertol's 2400 series railcars constructed for the Chicago Transit Authority in 1976, as well as for the N-5 railcars constructed by ABB Traction for SEPTA's Norristown High Speed Line.
