= Mirandela railway station =

Railway station in northern Portugal

Mirandela Station Estação Ferroviária de Mirandela
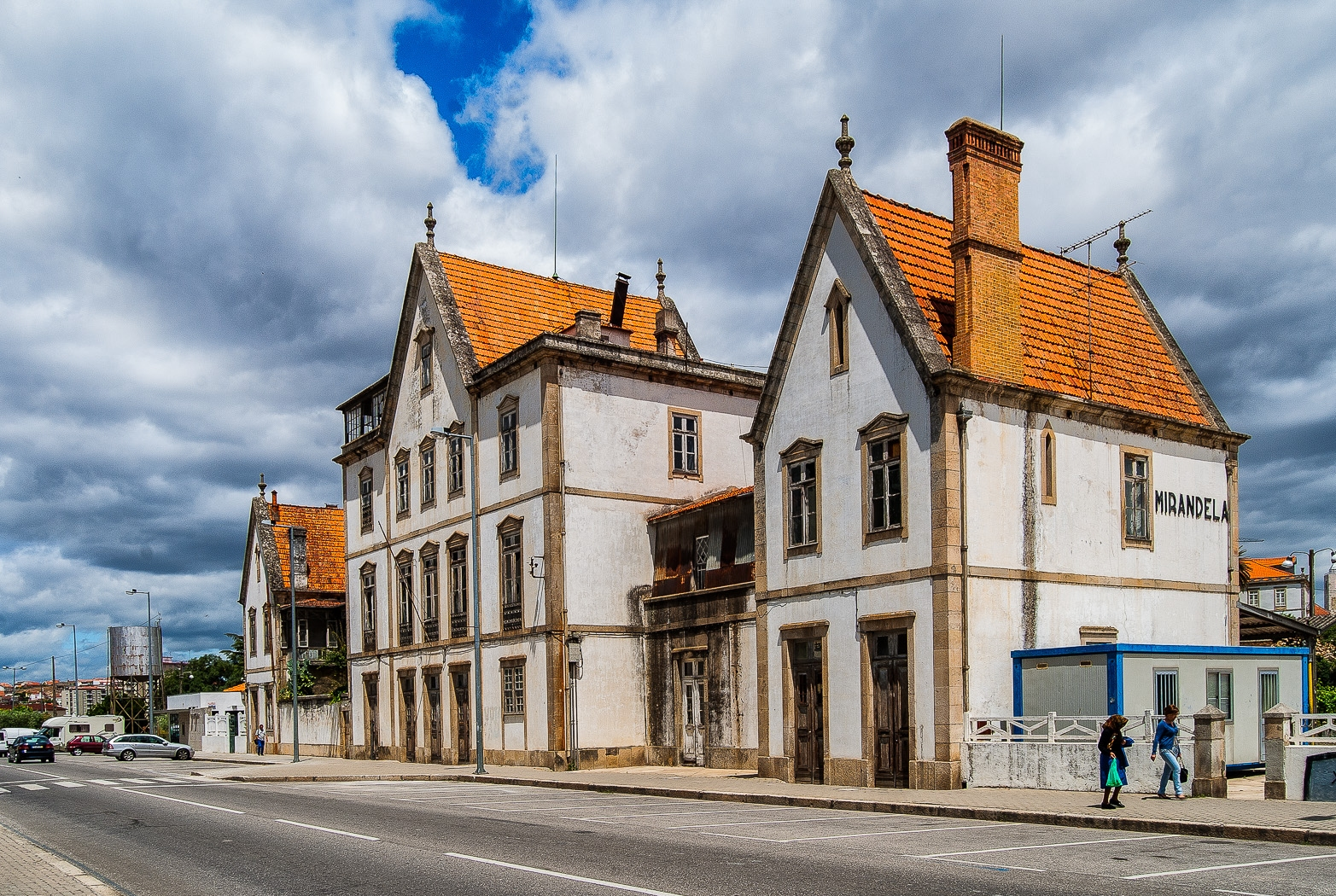
- The old Mirandela railway station in 2013

General information
- Location: Mirandela; Portugal
- Coordinates: 41°28′56″N 7°10′57″W
- Elevation: 230 m (750 ft)
- Lines: Old station: Tua line (1887-1991); New station: Tua line (1995-2009), Metro de Mirandela (1995-2018)
- Connections: Tua line: Carvalhais railway station, Cachão railway station; Metro de Mirandela: Tarana halt, Latadas halt

History
- Opened: 29 September 1887
- Closed: December 14, 2018; 7 years ago
Location
- Location within Portugal

The Mirandela railway station (previously spelled as Mirandella), was a station on the Tua line, which served the town of Mirandela, in the Bragança District of Portugal.

== History ==
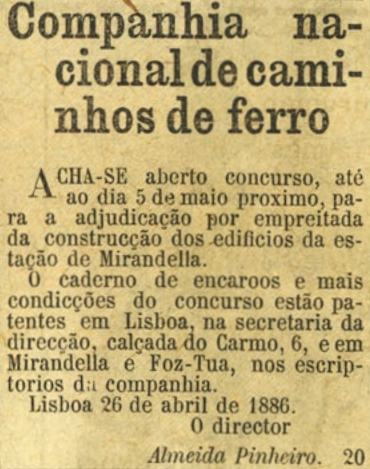
Announcement of the tender for the construction of the Mirandela Station, in April 1886

=== Inauguration ===
The section of the Tua Line between the stations of Tua and Mirandela was inaugurated on 27 September, 1887, and a special train was organized for the ceremony, which was welcomed at the station by a large crowd of people from Mirandela and the surrounding region. The royal family got off the train and walked in a procession to the town hall, while the locomotive went to the turntable to reverse, in order to tow the train in the opposite direction. When it passed the workshops, the stoker opened the doors to clean the smoke box, an operation that impressed the people gathered there. At the ceremony, which was also attended by the Minister for Public Works, Commerce and Industry, Barjona Freitas, several speeches were made and verses were recited, written by Joaquim Belchior de Azevedo and dedicated to both the king and the Tua line. A brass band also played, firecrackers were launched and dinner was also served in the station's goods depot. This section opened for operation two days later, by the Companhia Nacional de Caminhos de Ferro. The first stationmaster at Mirandela was Jerónimo Maria Cardoso.

The passenger building was on the southwest side of the road (right-hand side of the uphill direction to Bragança). The construction of the line to Mirandela was part of a period of great development of narrow gauge lines in Portugal, which began in the 1880s and also included the railway lines of the Dão, Vouga, Tâmega, Corgo, and the Sabor.

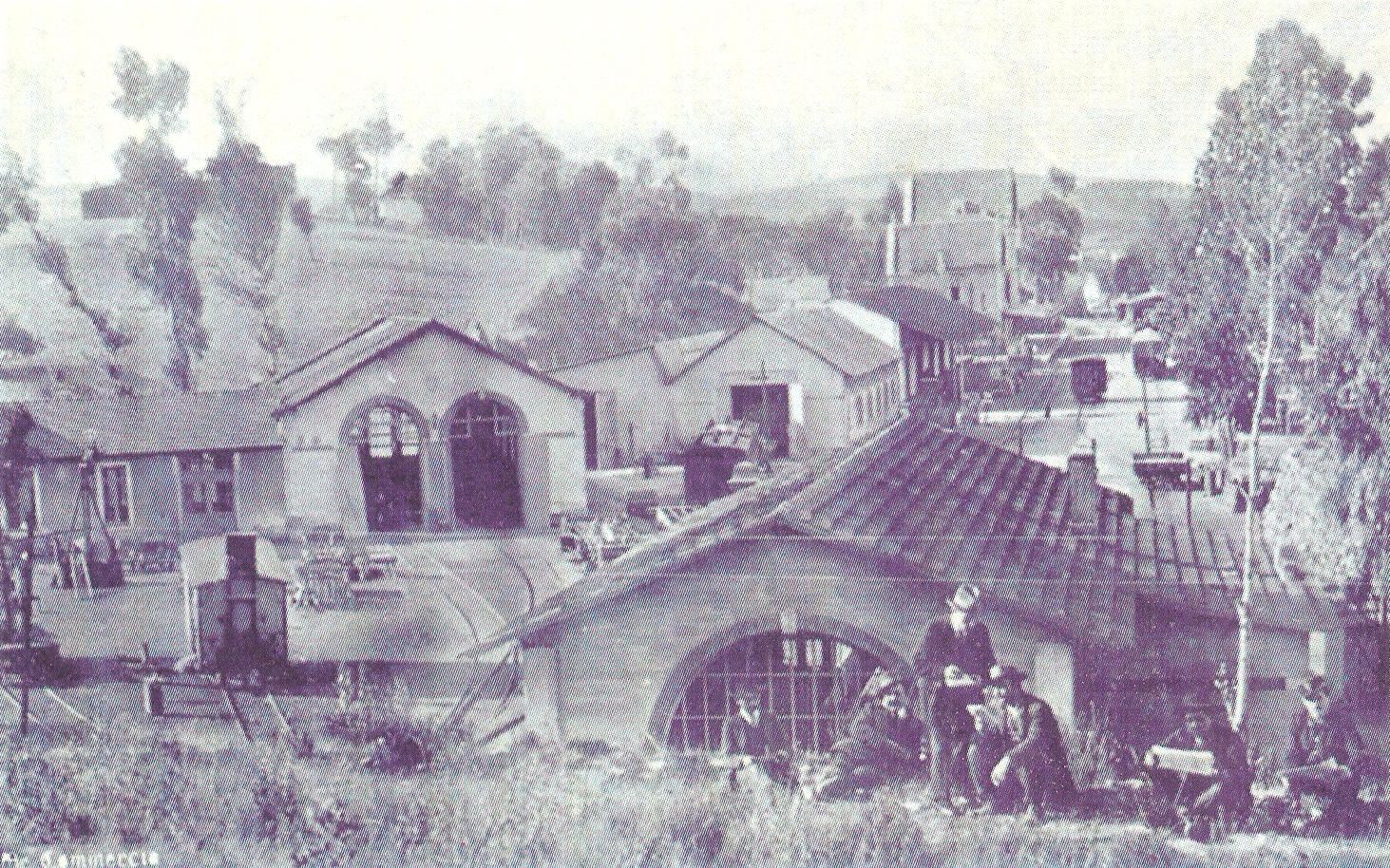
Postcard from the late 19th century, showing the passenger building and workshops of the Mirandela station

=== 20th century ===
==== 1900s and 1910s ====
In 1897, businessman Moses Zagury proposed the construction of a narrow gauge railroad from Mirandela to Bragança.

At the end of 1904, work was already underway on the section of the railway between Mirandela and Bragança. On 16 June, 1905, the Gazeta dos Caminhos de Ferro reported that the inauguration of the first section of the line, up to Quintela, was expected to take place soon.

In fact, on 28 July of that year, the government authorized the Companhia Nacional de Caminhos de Ferro to provisionally open the first section of the line beyond Mirandela, but it only went as far as Romeu. This section went into service on 2 August, 1905. On 17 October, 1905, the next section went into service, to Macedo de Cavaleiros, with the first train leaving this station at around 8 o'clock in the morning, bound for Mirandela. The train arrived at Sendas on December 18 of the same year, and at Rossas on 14 August, 1906, and finally the Bragança on 1 December, 1906, completing the Tua line.

At the beginning of the 20th century, Companhia Nacional created a fast service from Bragança to Tua, with stops at various stations, including Mirandela, the aim was to connect to the Porto - Medina Train, which ran along the Douro line on its way between São Bento and the Spanish city of Medina del Campo.

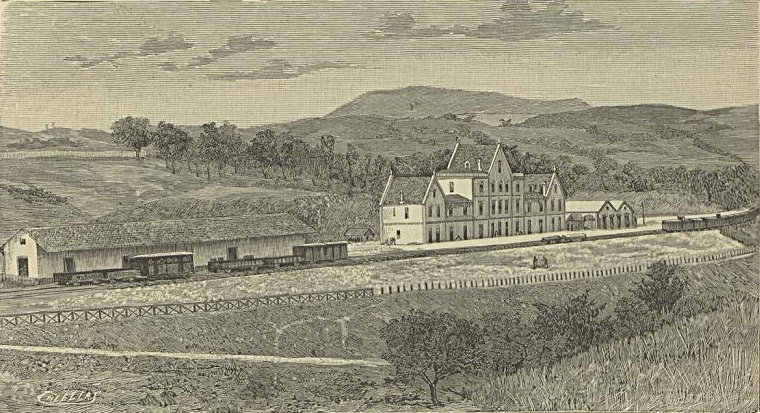
Mirandela railway station, in its early years (1887-1892)

In 1913, there were stagecoach services linking the Mirandela station to Torre de Dona Chama, Valpaços, Vilarandelo, Chaves and Boticas.

==== 1930s ====
The General Railway Network Plan, introduced by Decree no. 18:190 of 28 March 1930, alluded to the need to build a network of tracks linking the various narrow gauge lines north of the River Douro to each other and to the Leixões, in order to expand the area of influence of that port and improve operating conditions. This network, which was to extend from Caniços to Mirandela, was known as the Transversal de Trás-os-Montes, and one of its sections would be the Transversal de Valpaços, about 67 kilometres long, which would connect Mirandela to the Corgo line at the stations of Vila Pouca de Aguiar or Pedras Salgadas, according to later studies.

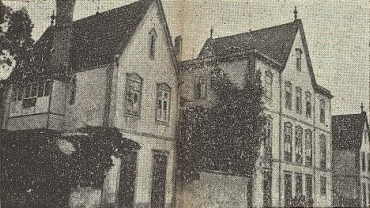
Old Mirandela railway station building, 1937

In 1933, Companhia Nacional carried out various interventions at Mirandela station, including covering and paving the uncovered quay, building a fence wall, landscaping the site, building a hangar for the rolling stock overhaul service, modifying part of the second floor of the building to house the Operating Services and extending the level crossing guard's house to house the general foreman of the 1st Track and Works Section. The following year, an access road to the coal wharf was laid, and in 1935 conservation work was carried out on the station building.

In 1939, the building was again the subject of work, with the residence of the director of operations being modified, various repairs being made to the public rooms and the offices of the operation; repairs were also made to the level crossing guard's house and the railway staff's dormitory, the chauffeur's room was enlarged, and a porch was built to serve as a storage room for firewood and a mechanical sawmill.

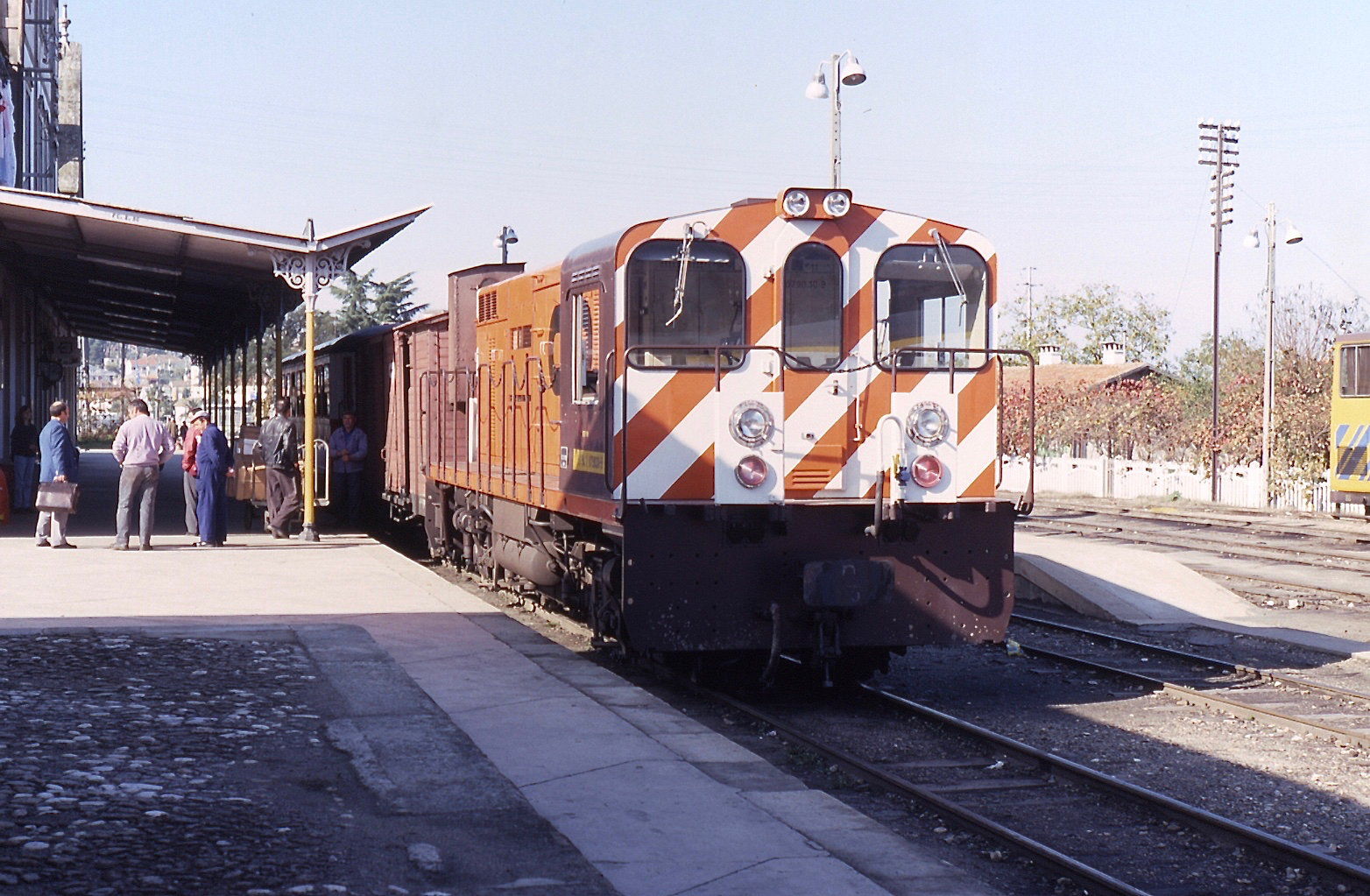
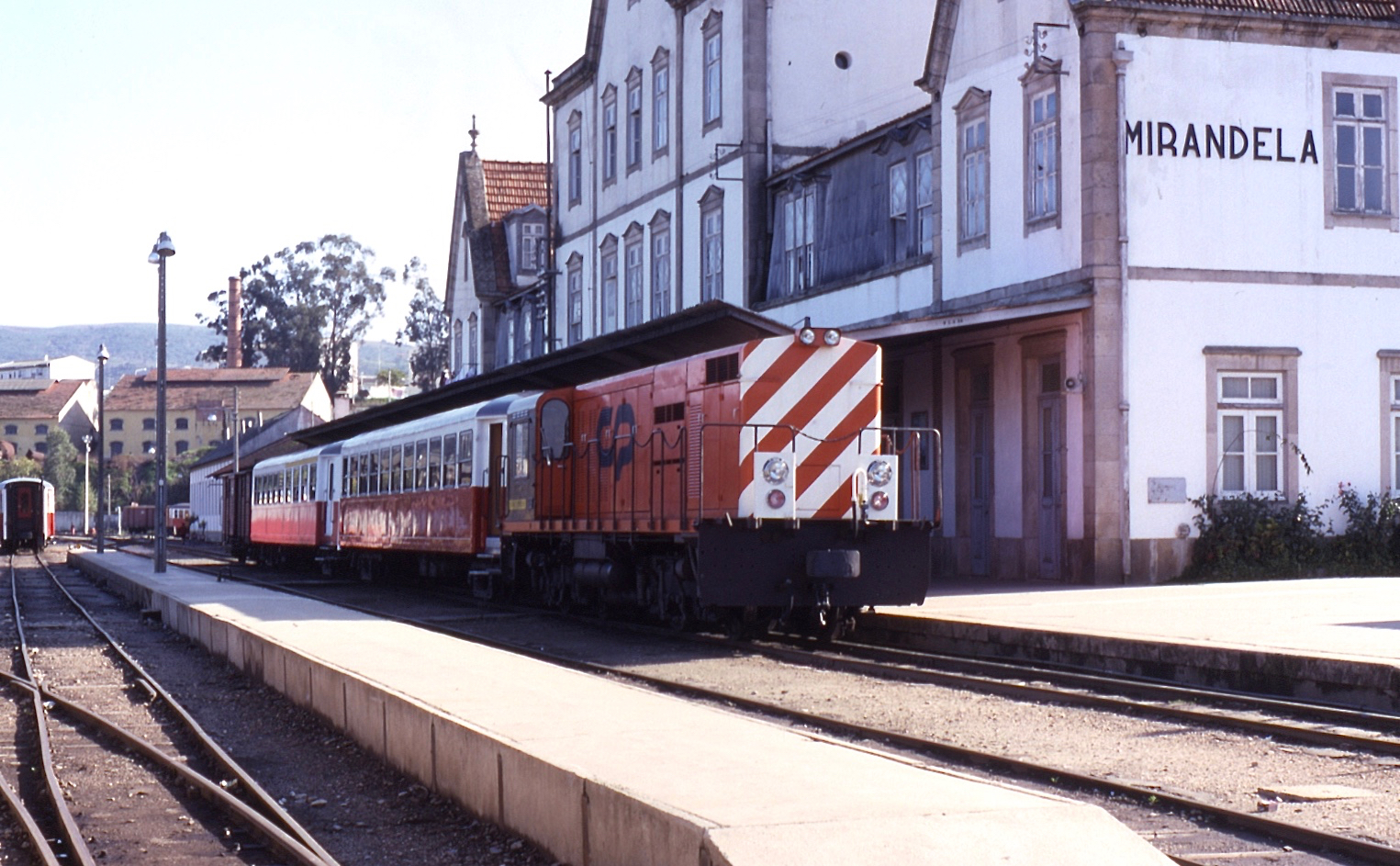
Composition led by the locomotive 9028 circulating at the Mirandela railway station in November 1993: ascending and descending service

In 1938, the first diesel locomotive in Portugal was assembled in the Mirandela workshops, baptised Lydya.

==== 1940s ====
On 1 January 1947, Companhia Nacional was integrated into the Portuguese Railway Company.

==== 1990s ====
In 1990, the locomotive 9006 was awarded to the Mirandela depot. On 15 December 1991, the operator Comboios de Portugal closed the section between Mirandela and Bragança, and on 13 October the following year it removed the rolling stock from that station and took it to Mirandela, in an operation that attracted considerable controversy.

In the 1990s, the Metro de Mirandela programme began, with the aim of using part of the Tua line for a light rail system. The first section, from Carvalhais to Mirandela, was inaugurated on 28 July 1995.

Since the closure of the section of the Tua line between Bragança and Mirandela in 1991, the city's entire railway heritage has been abandoned, including the new infrastructure that was built for the Metro de Mirandela, including the new Mirandela railway station, which has since been closed like the entire Tua line in 2009.

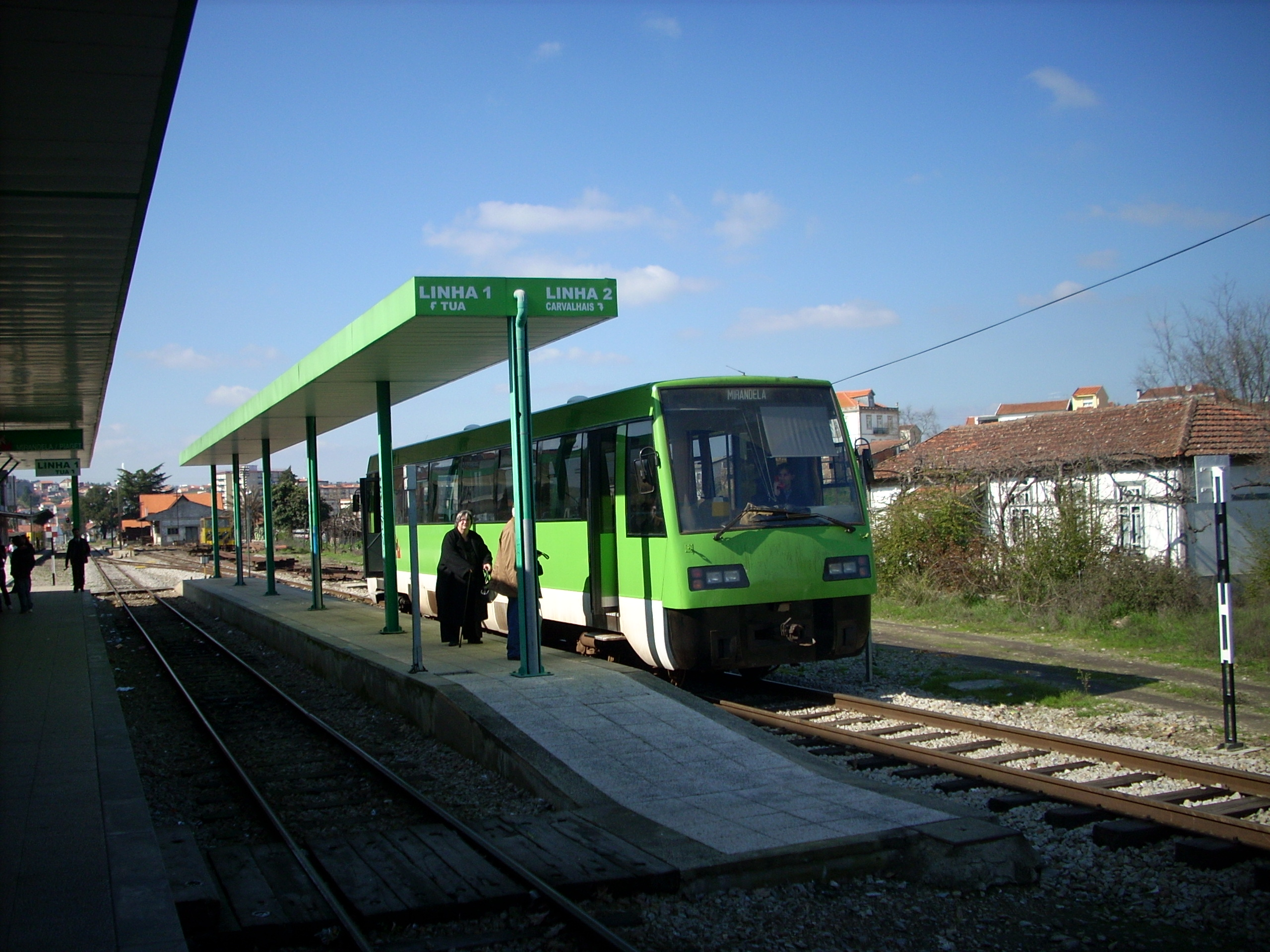
Platforms of the new Mirandela railway station, 2008

=== 21st century ===
The services of the Metro de Mirandela were extended to the Tua railway station on 21 October 2001. However, on 22 August 2008 train traffic was suspended on the section between the stations of Cachão and Tua, due to a serious accident.

On 26 March 2010, a group of citizens sent a request to the Direção-Geral do Património Cultural, proposing the classification of the section of the line between and Mirandela as a Heritage Site of National Interest, claiming its importance as a unique component of Portugal's railway heritage, and that it was at risk of being flooded with the future construction of the Tua Dam. This process was not followed up and was shelved by IGESPAR on 4 November of that year, thus leaving the Tua line without legal protection.

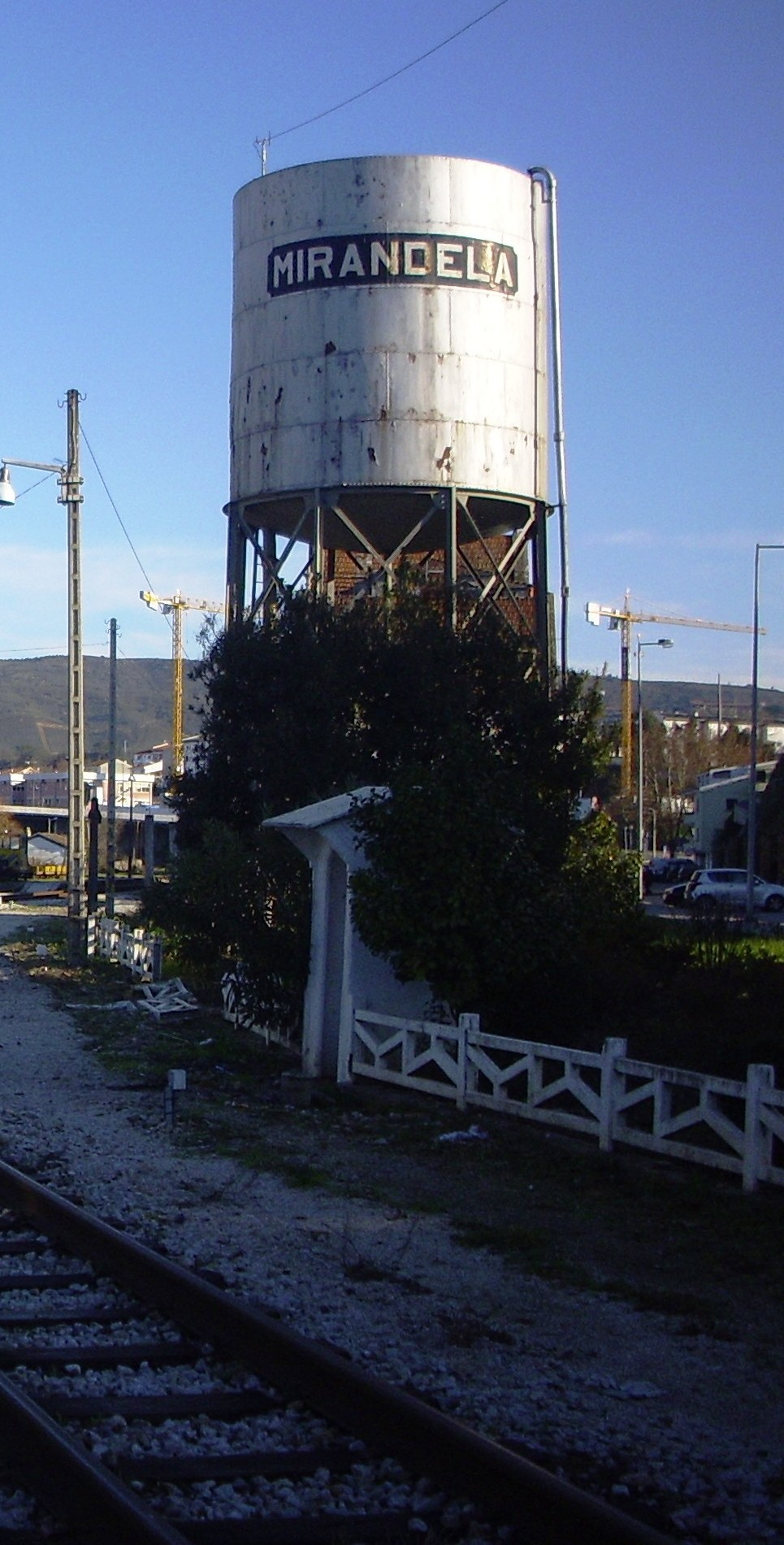
Mirandela station's water tank before the restoration works, 2009

On 14 December 2018 the rail services of the Metro de Mirandela were suspended, and as of 2023 it hasn’t been reopened yet.

In June 2021, the old Mirandela station began to undergo restoration and rehabilitation work, with first phase of the intervention being completed in the end of 2020, with the rehabilitation of the station's water tank.

The work, worth 2.5 million euros and 85 per cent subsidised by the European Regional Development Fund, includes restoring the building and improving the surrounding areas (Azenha valley). The rehabilitation of the old Mirandela railway station was seen as urgent due to the need to enhance the value of this historic building through a new functional programme, which aims to reconcile its use as a museum space (upper floors) and a space related to daily mobility and tourism on the Tua Line (lower floor). The architectural project focuses on the preservation of details, traces of memories of a legacy of the Tua line and the city of Mirandela.

The old Mirandela railway station is planned to become a Art house.

== See also ==
- Tua line
- Comboios de Portugal
- Infraestruturas de Portugal
- Rail transport in Portugal
- History of rail transport in Portugal

== Bibliography ==
- JACOB, João; ALVES, Vítor, S. A. e Comissão Nacional para as Comemorações do Centenário da República (2010). Bragança: Roteiros Republicanos. Matosinhos: Quidnovi, Edição e Conteúdos. p. 127. ISBN 978-989-554-722-7.
- MARTINS, João; BRION, Madalena; SOUSA, Miguel et a (1996). O Caminho de Ferro Revisitado: O Caminho de Ferro em Portugal de 1856 a 1996. Lisboa: Caminhos de Ferro Portugueses. p. 446.
- REIS, Francisco; GOMES, Rosa; GOMES, Gilberto; et al. (2006). Os Caminhos de Ferro Portugueses 1856-2006. Lisboa: CP-Comboios de Portugal e Público-Comunicação Social S. A. p. 238. ISBN 989-619-078-X.

== Recommended reading ==
- FONTE, José Rodrigues da; PEREIRA, Hugo Silveira Pereira, D.L. (2015). A linha de Foz-Tua a Bragança. Projecto FozTua. Vila Nova de Gaia: Inovatec. p. 150. ISBN 978-150-77884-0-0.
- LAGE, Maria Otília Pereira; VISEU, Albano; BEIRA, Eduardo, D.L.; et al. (2016). Memória oral e história do Vale do Tua: materiais de um projeto. Projecto FozTua. Vila Nova de Gaia: Inovatec. p. 168. ISBN 978-153-01709-0-6.
- LAGE, Maria Otília Pereira (2016). Tua: colectânea literária: o vale, o rio e a linha férrea. Projecto FozTua. Vila Nova de Gaia: Inovatec, D.L. p. 241. ISBN 978-989-98659-7-6.
- LOPES, Roger Teixeira (2002). Mirandela. Mirandela: João Azevedo. p. 148. ISBN 972-9001-55-3.
- McCANTS, Anne; et al. (2016). Railroads in historical context: construction, costs and consequences / FOZTUA International Conference. Projecto FozTua. Vol. 1 de 3. Vila Nova de Gaia: Inovatec, D.L. p. 462. ISBN 978-989-97134-5-1.
- McCANTS, Anne; et al. (2016). Railroads in historical context: construction, costs and consequences / FOZTUA International Conference. Projecto FozTua. Vol. 2 de 3. Vila Nova de Gaia: Inovatec, D.L. p. 490. ISBN 978-989-97134-8-2.
- McCANTS, Anne; et al. (2016). Railroads in historical context: construction, costs and consequences / FOZTUA International Conference. Projecto FozTua. Vol. 3 de 3. Vila Nova de Gaia: Inovatec, D.L. p. 538. ISBN 978-989-98659-6-9.
- McCANTS, Anne; et al. (2016). New uses for old railways: Tua. Projecto FozTua. Vila Nova de Gaia: Inovatec, D.L. p. 277. ISBN 978-153-36963-0-4.
- MONTEIRO, António; LOPES, Roger Teixeira (2003). Guia de Mirandela. Mirandela: Câmara Municipal de Mirandela. p. 122. ISBN 972-9021-09-0.
- SALES, Ernesto Augusto Pereira de (1983). Mirandela: apontamentos históricos. Bragança: Junta Distrital de Bragança. p. 297.
