= Tua =

Tua may refer to:

- Tua River, a river in Portugal
- Tua (Papua New Guinea), a river in Papua New Guinea
- Tuʻa, also known as Alo, a chiefdom in Wallis and Futuna in Oceania
- Tua line, a railway line in Portugal
- Tua railway station, in Portugal
- David Tua (born 1972), Samoan-New Zealand boxer
- Tua Forsström (born 1947), Finnish Swedish-language writer
- Tua Tagovailoa (born 1998), American football quarterback
- "Tua", the Māori language version of the song Bigger by Stan Walker

== See also ==
- Toua, a given name and surname
- Tuatua, a species of edible clam
- TUA (disambiguation)
- Twa, hunting castes in Africa
- Tuva (disambiguation)
