= Vila Real railway station =

Closed railway station in Portugal

Vila Real Station Estação Ferroviária de Vila Real
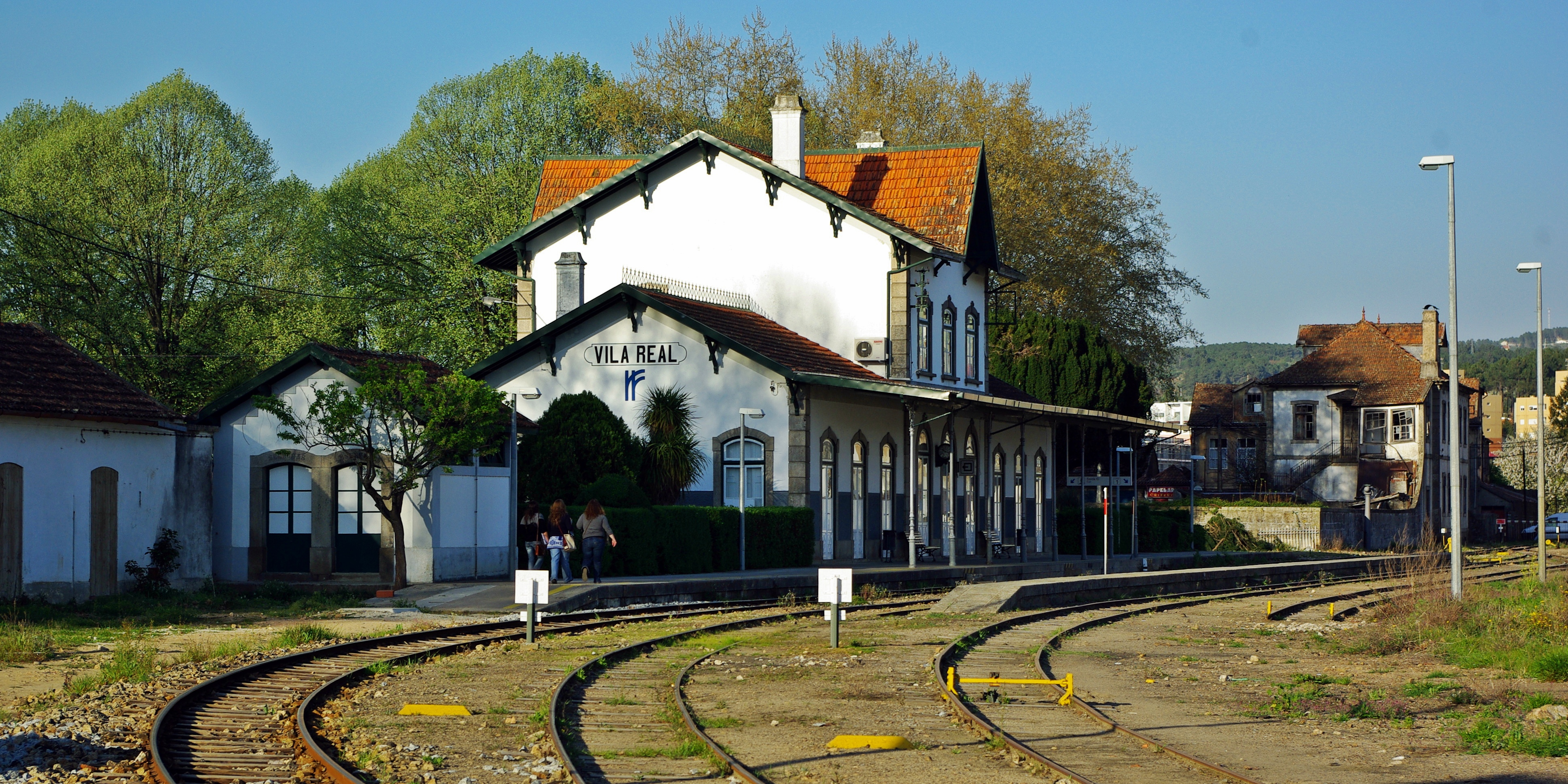
- Main building of the Vila Real station, in 2009

General information
- Location: Vila Real; Portugal
- Coordinates: 41.293849°N 7.739057°W
- Elevation: 425 m (1,394 ft)
- Owner: Infraestruturas de Portugal
- Line: Corgo line (1906-2009)
- Tracks: 2

Other information
- Classification: Station
- Website: "Monumentos". www.monumentos.gov.pt.

History
- Opened: 12 May 1906
- Closed: 25 March 2009
Location
- Location within Portugal

The Vila Real railway station is a closed interface of the Corgo line, which used to serve the city of Vila Real, in Portugal. It was inaugurated on 12 May 1906, and closed on 25 March 2009.

== Description ==
The station includes the passenger building, the railway track area and some technical support buildings, such as a covered warehouse, workshops and rolling stock depots. The passenger building has a rectangular plan made up of three bodies, arranged parallel and regularly to the line, the central one slightly higher and with two floors and the lateral ones with just one. Staggered volumes with differentiated roofs with hipped roofs on the central body and gable roofs on the sides, with ridges crowned by intersecting metal railings, painted green, and with raised chimneys on the central body and on the left side.

The façades are plastered and painted white, with a stonework base and another in curled cement, painted grey, the cornerstones are apilasted in split stonework, with frieze ends, painted grey and eaves on a very advanced wooden flap, made of green-painted wood on wooden beams, some with button ends. The façades are regularly divided by depressed lintel openings, with mouldings cut out on the outside and a protruding key, the windows with lower angles forming false right earrings and with ashlar sills, and, on the ground floor of the central body, with a round arch, with a protruding phytomorphic motif at the close, all with two-leaf frames and a flag.

The main façade faces northwest, with the central body advanced, ending in an acute gable, with an ashlar frieze separating the floors, opening three doors on the first and three balcony windows on the second, with ashlar guards forming false balusters; above, there is a circular clock with an ashlar frame. A similar round-arched door is cut into the centre of the side body. Two doors and a central sill window are cut into the side bodies; an inscribed bronze plaque is affixed to the left side body. Symmetrical side façades, divided by two doors, surmounted by the painted inscription VILA REAL and the Refer sign; in the central body, there is a narrow, lintelled sill window on the second floor. The rear façade faces the railway line and is divided in the central body, on the first floor, by three doors and, on the second floor, by three windows identical to those on the main façade, but without a stone guard, and on the sides by another three doors; along the entire ground floor there is an advanced, slightly inclined metal paling, resting on six iron columns, with phytomorphic capitals and angles decorated with plant elements; next to the central doors there is an advanced clock, painted green.

Next to the right-hand side façade are the sanitary facilities, rectangular in plan, with a single body and a gable roof over an advanced wooden gable. The façades are plastered and painted white, with a grey base, cornerstones, side window mouldings and upper frieze; they end in a gable, with the frieze forming a pine cone. The main façade has a door with a depressed lintel and a curved frame, surmounted by a tombstone inscribed men and, on the opposite side, two similar, twinned portals, with a lintel inscribed ladies and reserved, surmounted by the inscription retreats. The side façades are divided at the top by two rectangular openings with a wooden grille forming an X. Next to the toilets is a small garden area with boxwoods and a circular fountain. It is followed by a rectangular body and, further on, a covered storeroom with a rectangular plan and a gable roof. On the opposite side, there are other buildings and the water tank.

== History ==
=== Background ===
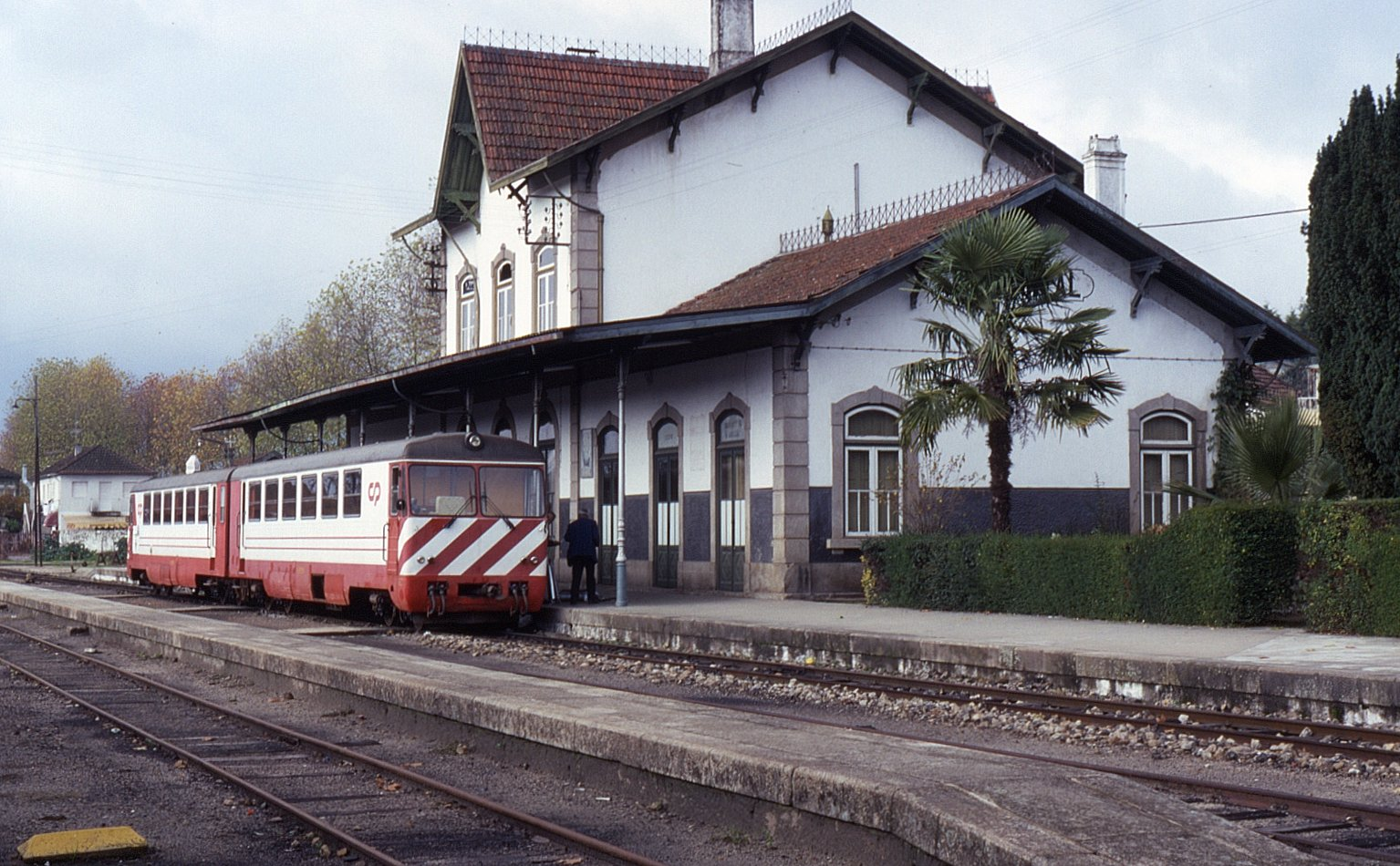
Vila Real station, 1993.

During António Cardoso Avelino's term as Minister of Public Works, Commerce and Industry (1871-1876), the German industrialist Maximiliano Schreck presented a project for a railway between Vila Real, Régua, Lamego and Viseu, which was not followed up.

In the 1870s, businessman and politician Oliveira Martins planned the continuation of the Póvoa line to Vila Real and Chaves.

=== Planning and inauguration ===
When the plans to build and operate the Corgo line were published by the government on 24 May 1902, the line was divided into 5 sections, the first from Régua to Vila Real, and the second from this point to Vila Pouca de Aguiar. The Vila Real station, according to the plans, was to be installed in the Monte da Raposeira area, next to the city.

The Corgo line was built by the Minho e Douro division of the Caminhos de Ferro do Estado, starting on 24 August 1903. In May 1904, work on the stretch to Vila Real was ahead of schedule.

The train first arrived in Vila Real station on 1 April 1906, but the station was only inaugurated on 12 May 1906 as a temporary terminus of the Corgo line. A special train was built for the inauguration ceremony, hauled by a locomotive from the CP Series E161 to E170.

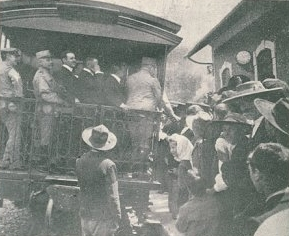
Arrival of King Carlos in Vila Real, 14 July 1907.

To connect the metal bridge to the station, an avenue was installed, which after the inauguration was renamed D. Carlos Avenue. After the implantation of the Portuguese Republic, the name was changed to 5th of October Avenue.

=== Continuation to Pedras Salgadas ===
On 1 March 1905, work was already underway on the next section, from Vila Real to Pedras Salgadas.

On 14 July 1907, King Carlos I travelled along the Corgo line to inaugurate the section to Pedras Salgadas. As he passed through the Vila Real station, he was greeted by two opposing demonstrations, one in favour of the monarchy and the other against the dictatorship of João Franco. This section went into service the following day.

On 5 September 1909, Bernardino Machado visited Vila Real and was welcomed at the station by the republicans of the town, Sabrosa and Santa Marta de Penaguião.

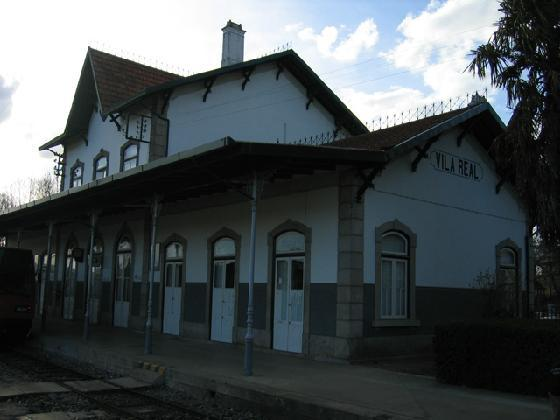
Main building of the Vila Real station, 2009.

On 26 September 1910, the civil governor issued a letter to the local authorities in Vila Real, asking them to come to the station to prepare for the future visit of King Manuel II to the town. This trip was supposed to take place on 5 October of that year, but it didn't happen because of the Republican revolution.

== First Republic ==
In 1913, there was a stagecoach route between Sabrosa and Vila Real station.

On 21 April 1917, the Battalion of Infantry Regiment No. 13, based in Vila Real, left for Lisbon in two special trains, and then embarked for France. On 6 January 1919, Major Alberto Margaride's column from the Northern Military Junta arrived in Peso da Régua with the aim of conquering Vila Real. The Republican resistance was led by Colonel Ribeiro de Carvalho, who ordered the suspension of train traffic on the stretch between Régua railway station and Vila Real. On 25 January, the monarchists caused several disturbances in the town, so inspector Francisco d'Almeira Guimarães withdrew the rolling stock to Vidago to hinder the royalist advance on Chaves.

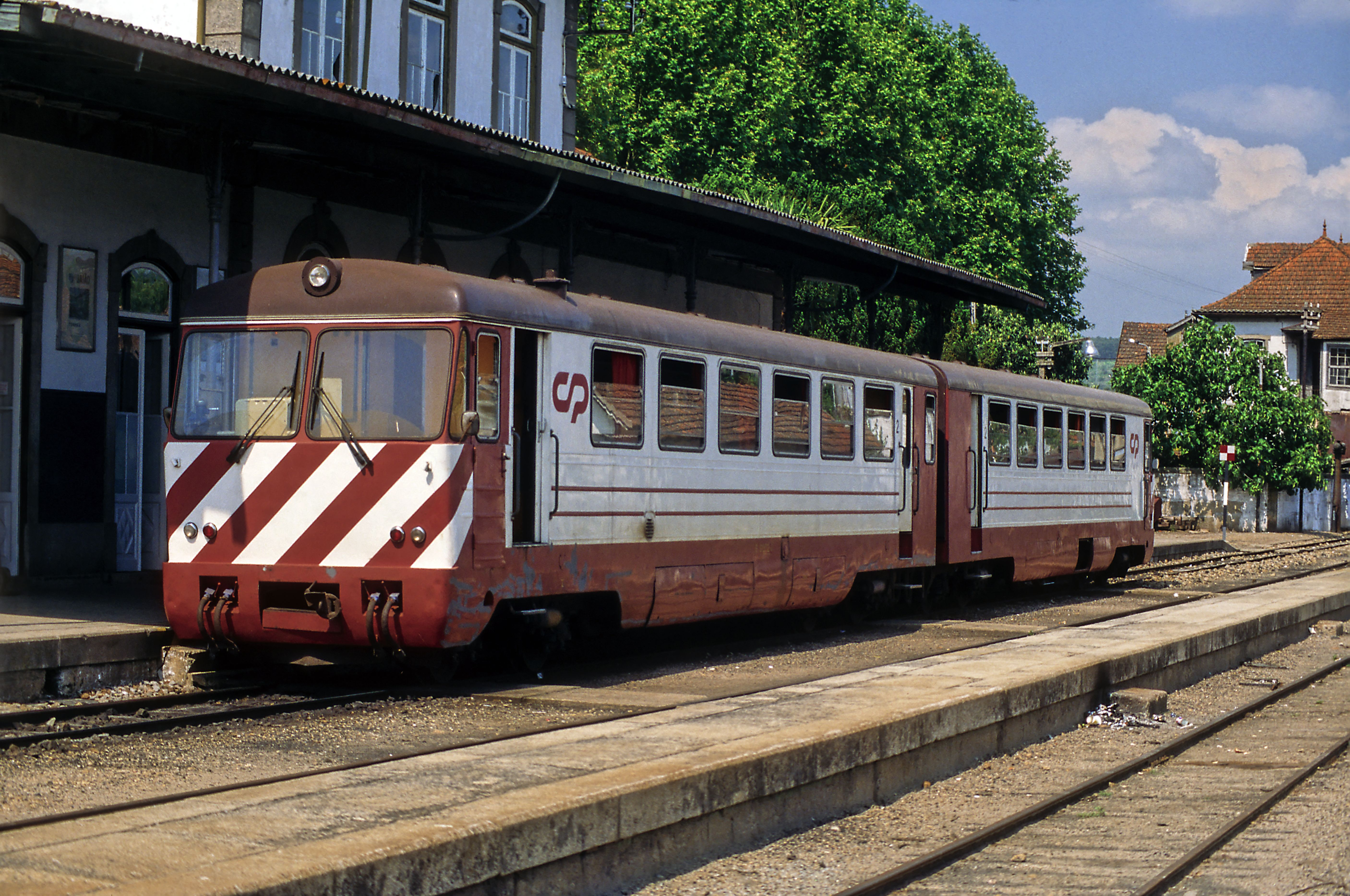
CP Class 9700 railcars at Vila Real station in 1996.

In October 1921, the body of António Granjo, who had been murdered during the 19 October uprising, was transported by rail to Chaves. When the funeral train passed through Vila Real, the town's shops closed their doors in his honour. During the Revolution of 28 May 1926, the 13th Infantry Regiment occupied several buildings in Vila Real, including the railway station.

== Decline and closure ==
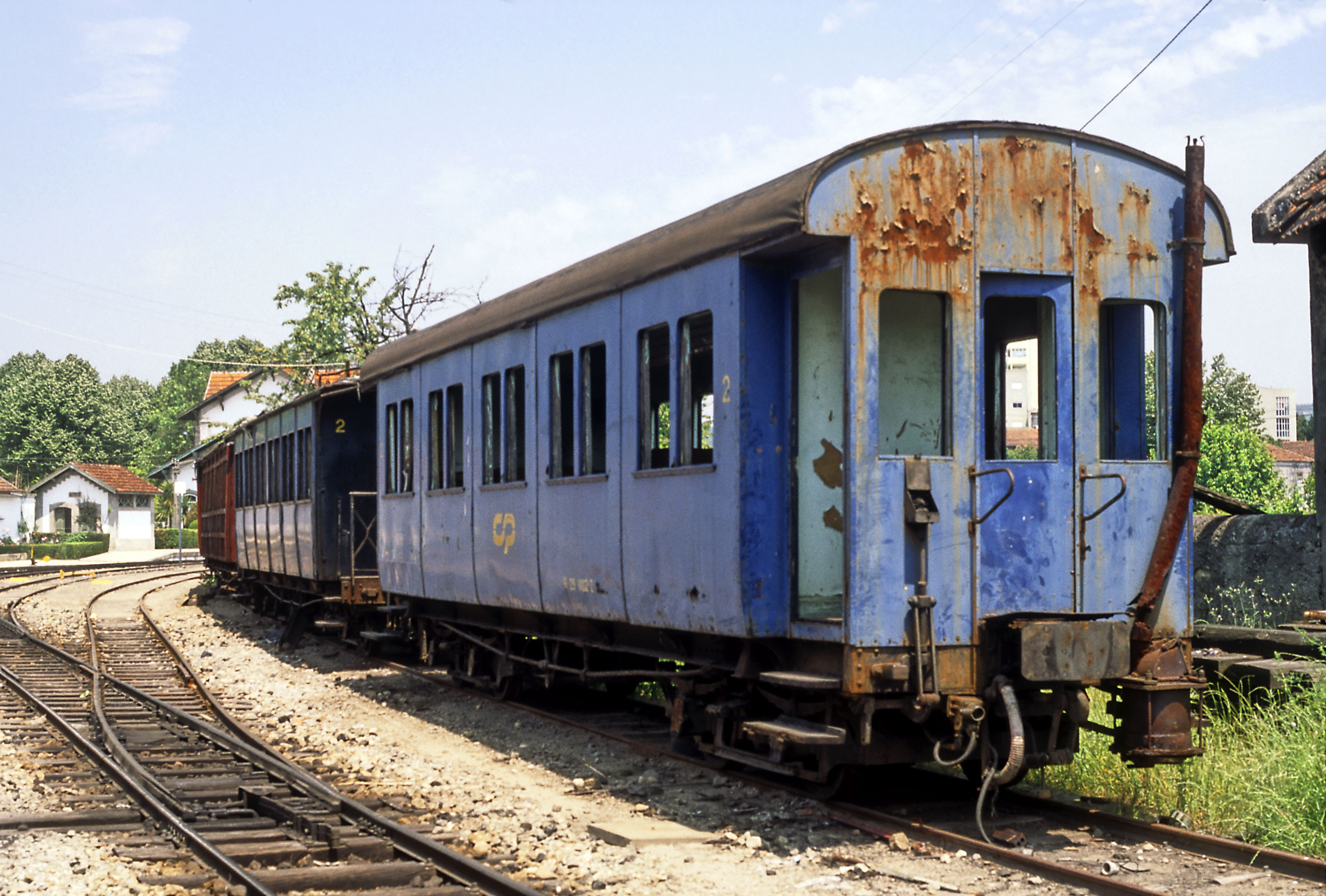
Abandoned carriages at Vila Real station, 1996

The section of the Corgo line between Chaves and Vila Real was closed on 2 January 1990 as part of a restructuring programme by the company Comboios de Portugal.

On 25 March 2009, train traffic between Vila Real station and Régua was suspended to carry out work, and the National Railway Network closed it for good in July 2010.
