= Class 9500 =

Class 9500 may refer to:

- CP Class 9500, diesel railcars
- NS Class 9500, electric multiple units
