= CP Class 9700 =

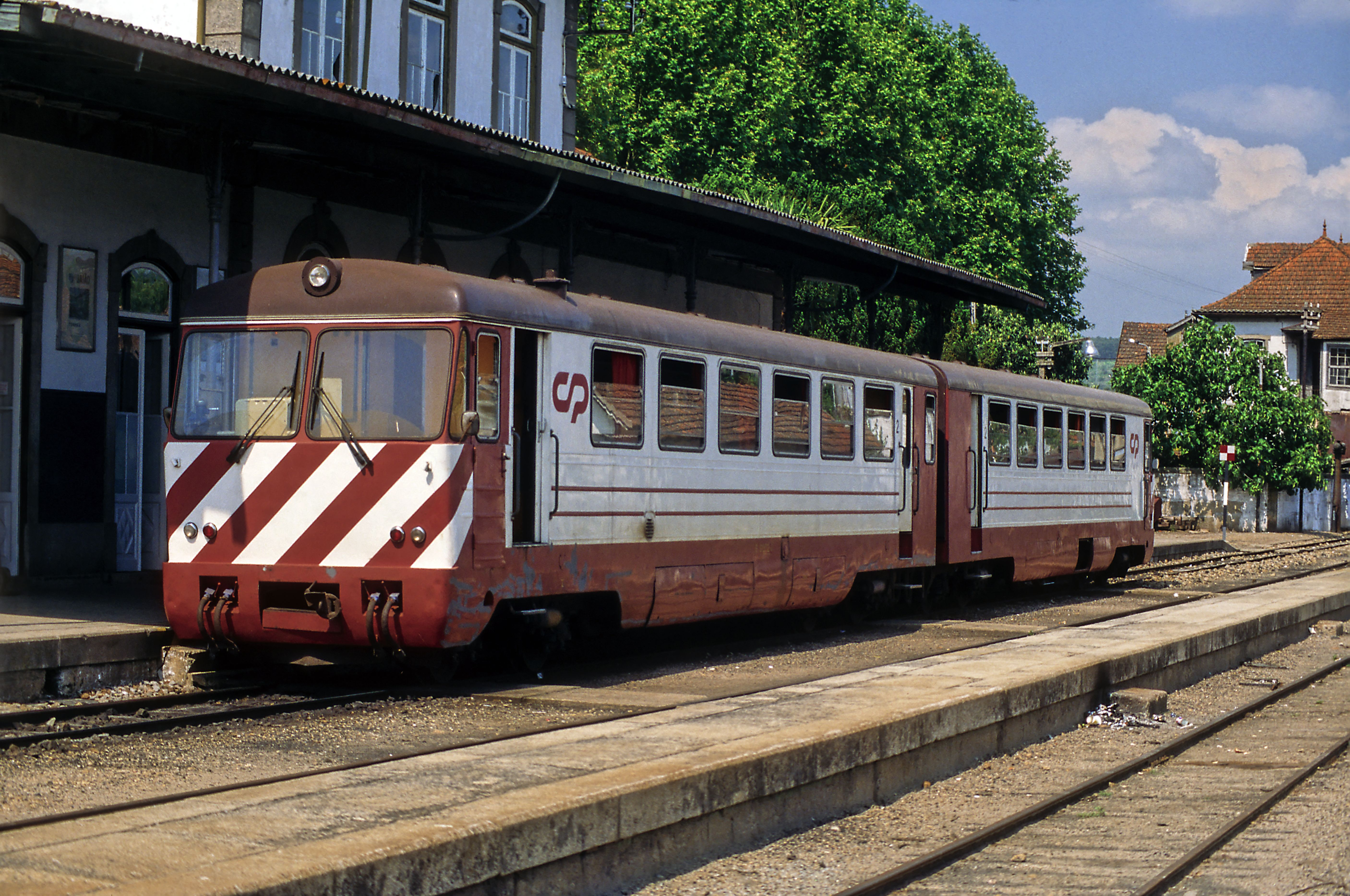
A Série 9700 diesel multiple unit train at Vila Real station on the Corgo line

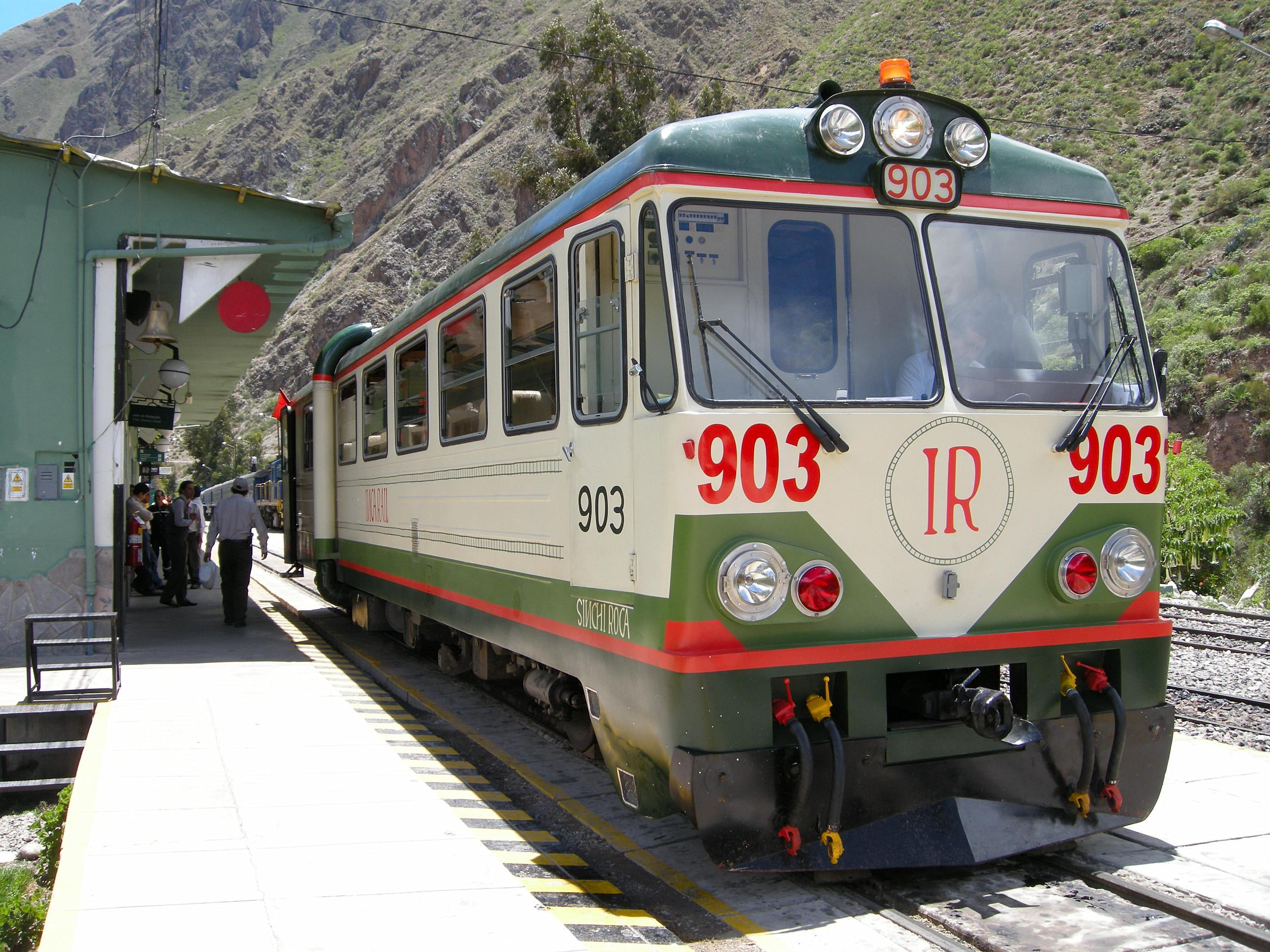
New life in Peru: three three-coach-consists are now bringing tourists to the Mach Pichu site

The Série 9700 were a type of diesel multiple unit train used by the Portuguese Railways (CP) on metre gauge lines, including the Tua line and Corgo line. They were originally built by Đuro Đaković in the 1960s for use on 760 mm (2 ft 5 15/16 in) gauge railways in Yugoslavia, and while used there bore the class name JŽ 802. They were purchased secondhand by CP from the Yugoslav Railways in 1980; for use in Portugal they had to be regauged.

They frequently proved unreliable in service and several were substantially rebuilt, with new engines. The trains were nicknamed Xepas, after the unfortunate principal character on the Brazilian comedic soap opera Dona Xepa broadcast on Portuguese television. The chassis of several vehicles have survived and were extensively rebuilt in the mid-1990s, with new bodywork, and were reclassified as Série 9500. These rebuilt railcars are now used on the Metro de Mirandela. The rest of the fleet have been withdrawn, with some vehicles being exported to Peru (Inca Rail 903...925) and Mozambique. The units were further regauged to either 914 mm (3 ft) (Peru) or 1,067 mm (3 ft 6 in) gauge (Mozambique).

== See also ==
- Inca Rail
- Narrow gauge railways in Portugal
- Narrow-gauge railways in Bosnia and Herzegovina, where these units originally operated
