= Tuva (disambiguation) =

Tuva is a federal subject of Russia.

Tuva may also refer to:

== Geographical locations ==
=== Political entities ===
- Tuvan People's Republic (People's Republic of Tannu Tuva, 1921–1944)
- Tuvan Autonomous Oblast (1944–1961)
- Tuvan Autonomous Soviet Socialist Republic (1961–1992)

=== Other locations ===
- Tuva Depression, a region in Siberia
- Tuva River, a river in Fiji

== People ==
- Tuva Semmingsen (born 1975), Norwegian opera singer (mezzo-soprano)
- Tuva Novotny (born 1979), Swedish actress and singer

== Other uses ==
- Tuva or Bust!, a book by Ralph Leighton
- Tuva Silver Vole, a rodent found in Russia and Mongolia
- Tuvan throat singing, a form of overtone singing
- Project Tuva, a project by Microsoft Research and Bill Gates designed to teach people about the core of physics

== See also ==
- Tua (disambiguation)
