= Toua =

Toua is a Papua New Guinean name. Notable people with this name include:

== Surname ==
- Aidan Toua (born 1990), Papua New Guinean rugby player
- Dika Toua (born 1984), Papua New Guinean weightlifter
- Isabel Toua (born 1995), Papua New Guinean cricketer

== Given name ==
- Toua Tueni (born 1997), Tuvaluan football player
- Toua Udia (born 1992), Papua New Guinean weightlifter

== See also ==
- Tua (disambiguation)
