= CP Class 9500 =

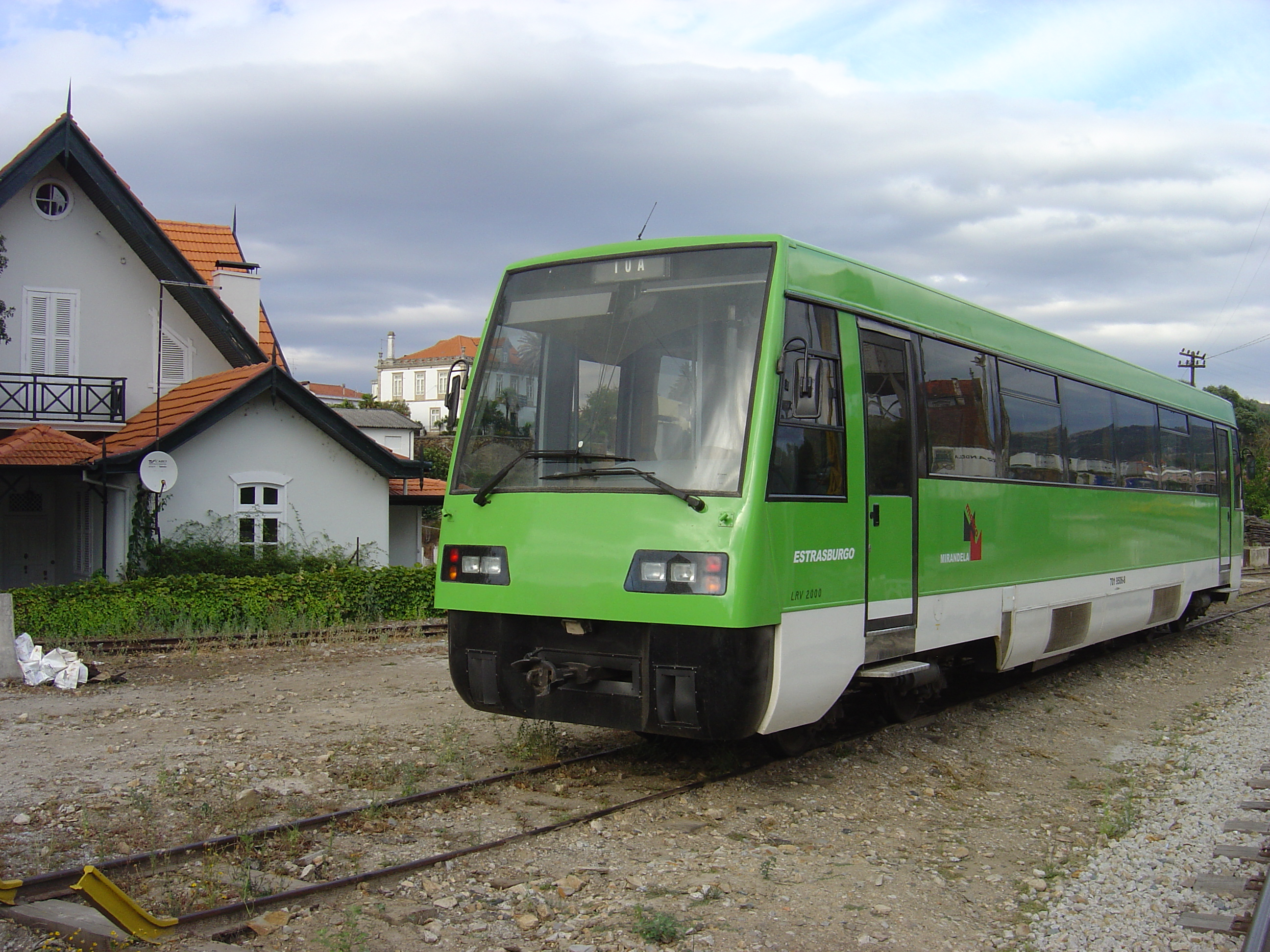
A Série 9500 railcar used on the Metro de Mirandela

The Série 9500 are a class of lightweight diesel railcars formerly used by Comboios de Portugal on the metre gauge railways in northern Portugal. They are also known as LRV2000.

Nine were constructed in the late 1990s (with new bodywork and new Volvo engines) from the chassis of Yugoslav-built, former Série 9700 railcars. Four railcars intended for the Metro de Mirandela were given a bright green livery, the other five carried a red livery.

With the closure of most of the Tua line in 2008 and the entirety of the Corgo and Tâmega lines in 2009, as of 2012 only two of the nine railcars built remain in use, although they are currently out of service for maintenance after the closure of the Metro de Mirandela. Given that funding for the Metro de Mirandela project had been given by the European Union the railcars were named Lisboa, Paris, Estrasburgo (Strasbourg) and Bruxelas (Brussels). The railcar Bruxelas was subsequently destroyed in an accident in January 2007. The other five railcars have been sold to Inca Rail in Peru and regauged to 914 mm (former 3 ft gauge).

== See also ==
- Narrow gauge railways in Portugal
