= Metro de Mirandela =

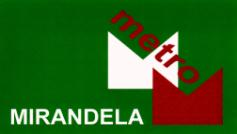

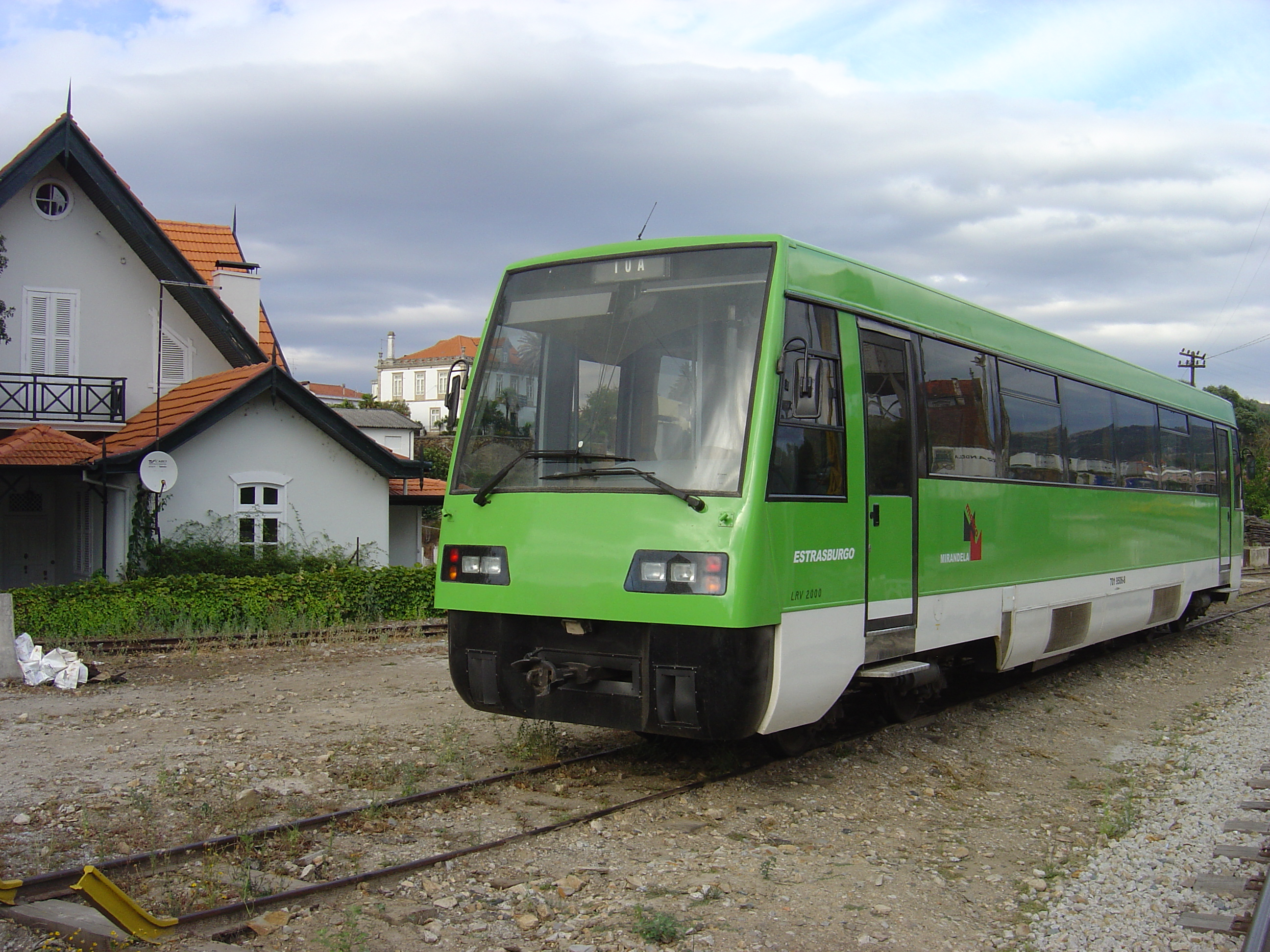
- Série 9500 railcar used on the Metro de Mirandela

Overview
- Status: Closed
- Locale: Mirandela
- First service: 28 June 1995; 29 years ago
- Last service: 14 December 2018; 6 years ago

Route
- Termini: Carvalhais: Mirandela (1995–2001); Tua (2001–2008); Cachão (2008–2018)
- Stops: 6 (1995–2001); 18 (2001–2008); 8 (2008–2018)
- Distance travelled: 3.9 km (2.4 mi) (1995–2001); 58.1 km (36.1 mi) (2001–2008); 16.2 km (10.1 mi) (2008–2018)
- Line(s) used: Linha do Tua

Technical
- Rolling stock: Série 9500
- Track gauge: 1,000 mm (3 ft 3 3/8 in) metre gauge

The Metropolitano Ligeiro de Mirandela or simply Metro de Mirandela was a metre gauge suburban rail service in Mirandela Municipality, northern Portugal. The service was closed on 14 December 2018.

During the day, trains ran with frequencies between of 26–160 minutes, operating between 7:45 to just past 18:00.

The service was operated between Carvalhais and Mirandela by two Série 9500 (LRV2000) diesel railcars.
