= TUA =

TUA may stand for:

- Theological University of Apeldoorn, a theological university in the Netherlands
- Tokyo University of Agriculture, a private university in Japan
- Tokyo University of the Arts, a national university in Japan
- TOW Under Armor, armored missile systems
- Trinity University of Asia, a university in Quezon City, Philippines
- Tulcan Airport in Tulcán, Ecuador
- Turkish Space Agency, (Türkiye Uzay Ajansı, TUA)
- The Umbrella Academy, a comic series by Gerard Way
- Lemony Snicket: The Unauthorized Autobiography, a 2002 novel

== See also ==
- Tua (disambiguation)
