= CP Class 9020 =

Portuguese diesel locomotive

Class 9020
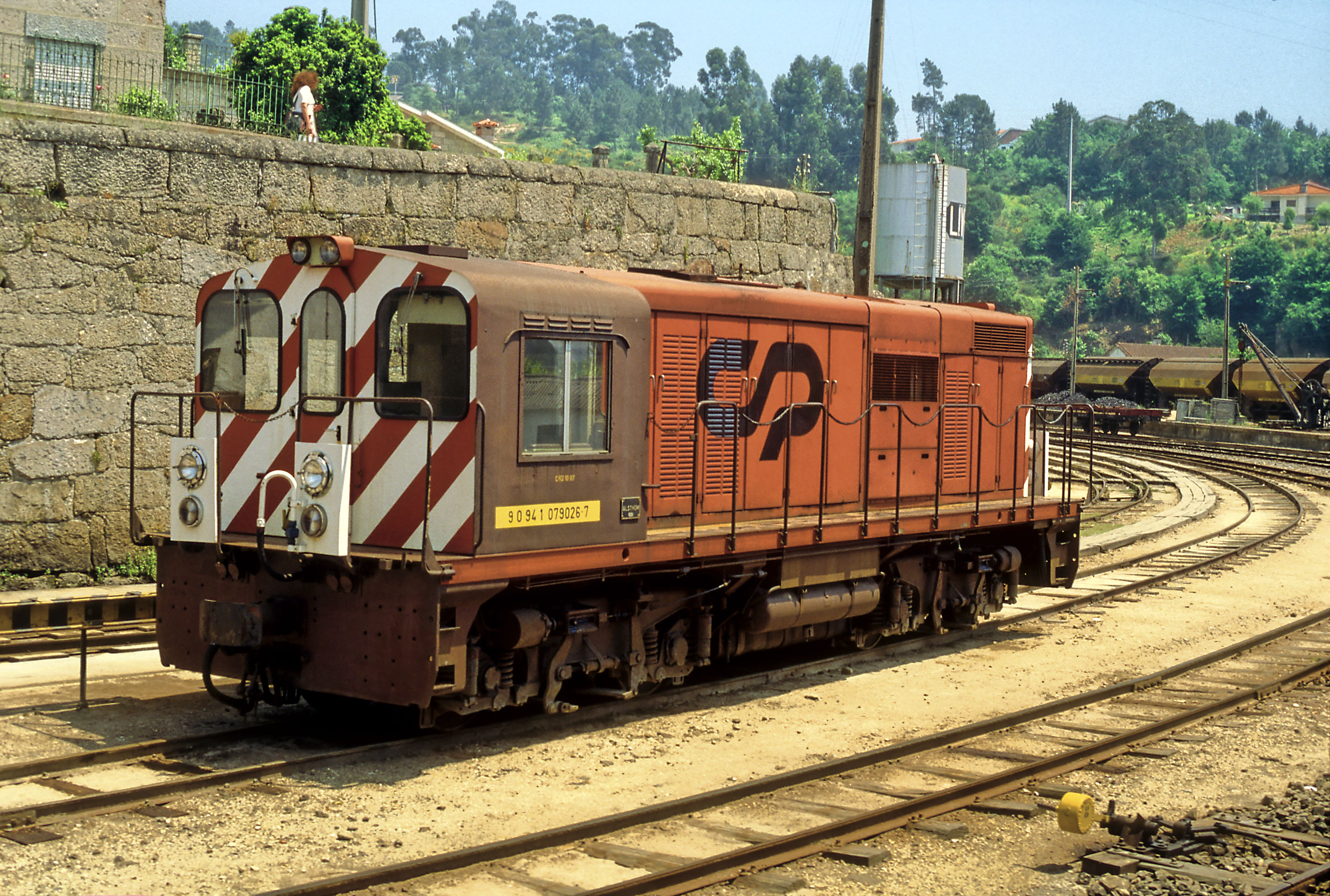
- A locomotive of Série 9020, at Livração station in May 1996
Type and origin
- Builder: Alsthom
- Total produced: 4
Specifications
- Configuration
  - AAR: B-B
  - UIC: B' B'
- Gauge: 1,000 mm (3 ft 3 3/8 in)
- Wheel diameter: 950 mm (37.4 in)
- Prime mover: S.A.C.M MGO V 12 ASHR
- RPM range: 1.500 RPM
- Engine type: 4-stroke Diesel
- Displacement: 54 L (54,000.0 cc)
- Generator: Alsthom CC 830 H 10
- Traction motors: Alsthom TA 641 M
- Cylinders: V12
- Cylinder size: 175 mm × 192 mm (6.9 in × 7.6 in)
- Transmission: Diesel-Electric
- Gear ratio: 79:14
- MU working: Within class, up to 3
- Train brakes: Westinghouse air brake, Vacuum brake
- Safety systems: VACM dead mans switch
Performance figures
- Maximum speed: 70 km/h (43.5 mph)
- Power output
  - Starting: 1,050 hp (783.0 kW)
  - Continuous: 1,000 hp (745.7 kW)
- Tractive effort
  - Starting: 11,500 kgf (25,353.2 lbf)
  - Continuous: 10,600 kgf (23,369.0 lbf)
Career
- Operators: Comboios de Portugal
- Class: Série 9020
- Numbers: 9001 - 9004
- Locale: Portugal
- First run: 1975
- Disposition: seven sold to Madarail

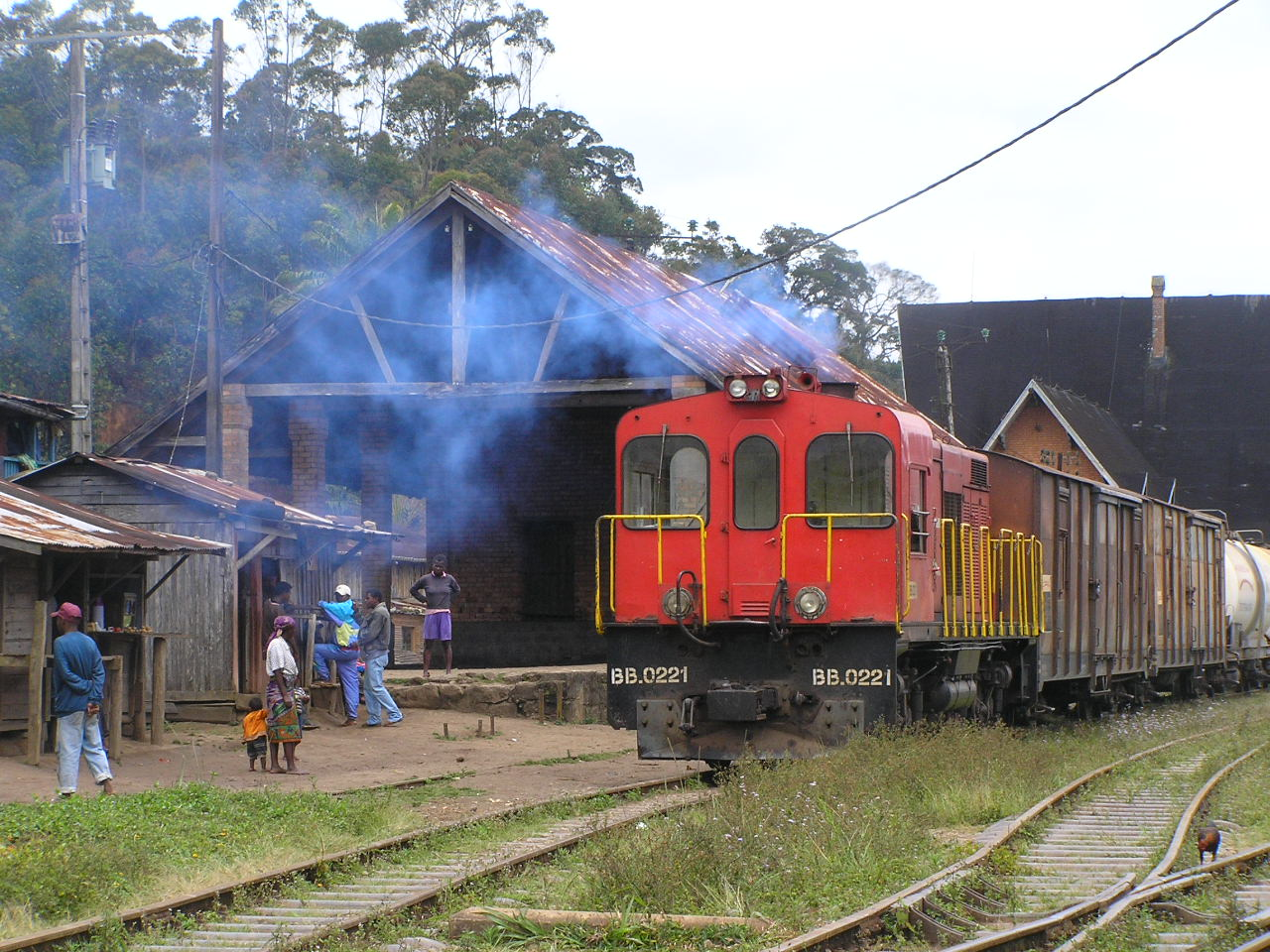
A former CP Class 9020 locomotive at Andasibe in Madagascar in 2005

Série 9020 was a class of metre-gauge diesel locomotives built by Alsthom for the Portuguese Railways (CP). They entered service in 1975. By the early years of the 21st century the metre-gauge lines on which they operated (such as the Corgo line and the Tua line) have now almost all been closed, resulting in the withdrawal of the locomotives. After their withdrawal, some of the locomotives were sold to Madarail in Madagascar.

== See also ==
- Narrow gauge railways in Portugal
