= Corgo line =

Portuguese closed railway line

Linha do Corgo
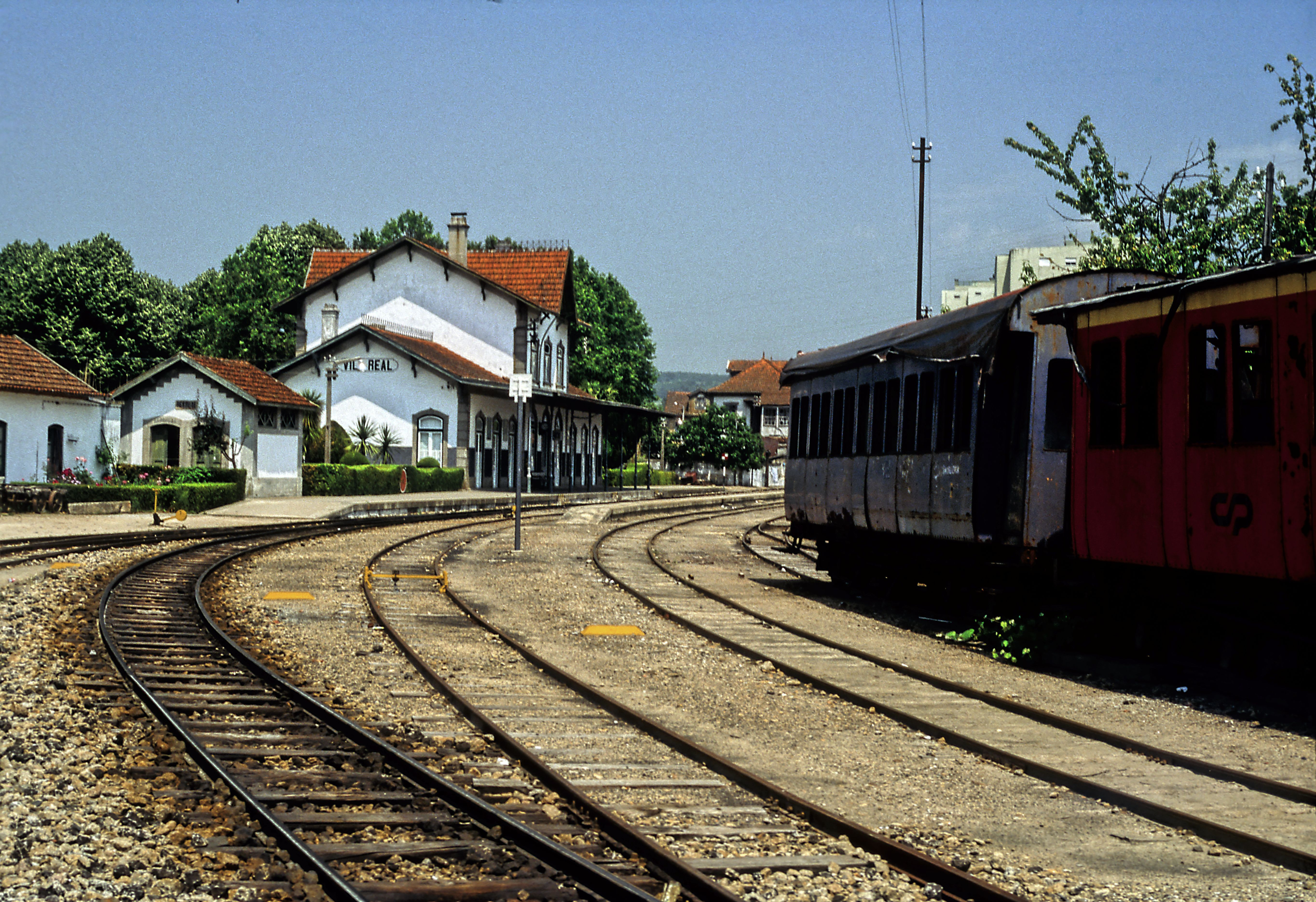
- Vila Real railway station.

Overview
- Status: Closed
- Termini: Régua; Chaves

Service
- Operator(s): Comboios de Portugal

Technical
- Line length: 71.4 km (44.4 mi)
- Track gauge: 1,000 mm (3 ft 3 3/8 in) metre gauge
Route map
Location on the network

The Corgo line (Portuguese: Linha do Corgo) was a 1,000 mm (3 ft 3 3/8 in) metre gauge railway line in northern Portugal. It closed in 2009. It ran north from Régua (a junction station on the main Douro railway line running along the Douro Valley) to Vila Real and Chaves. The line was latterly operated by Comboios de Portugal.

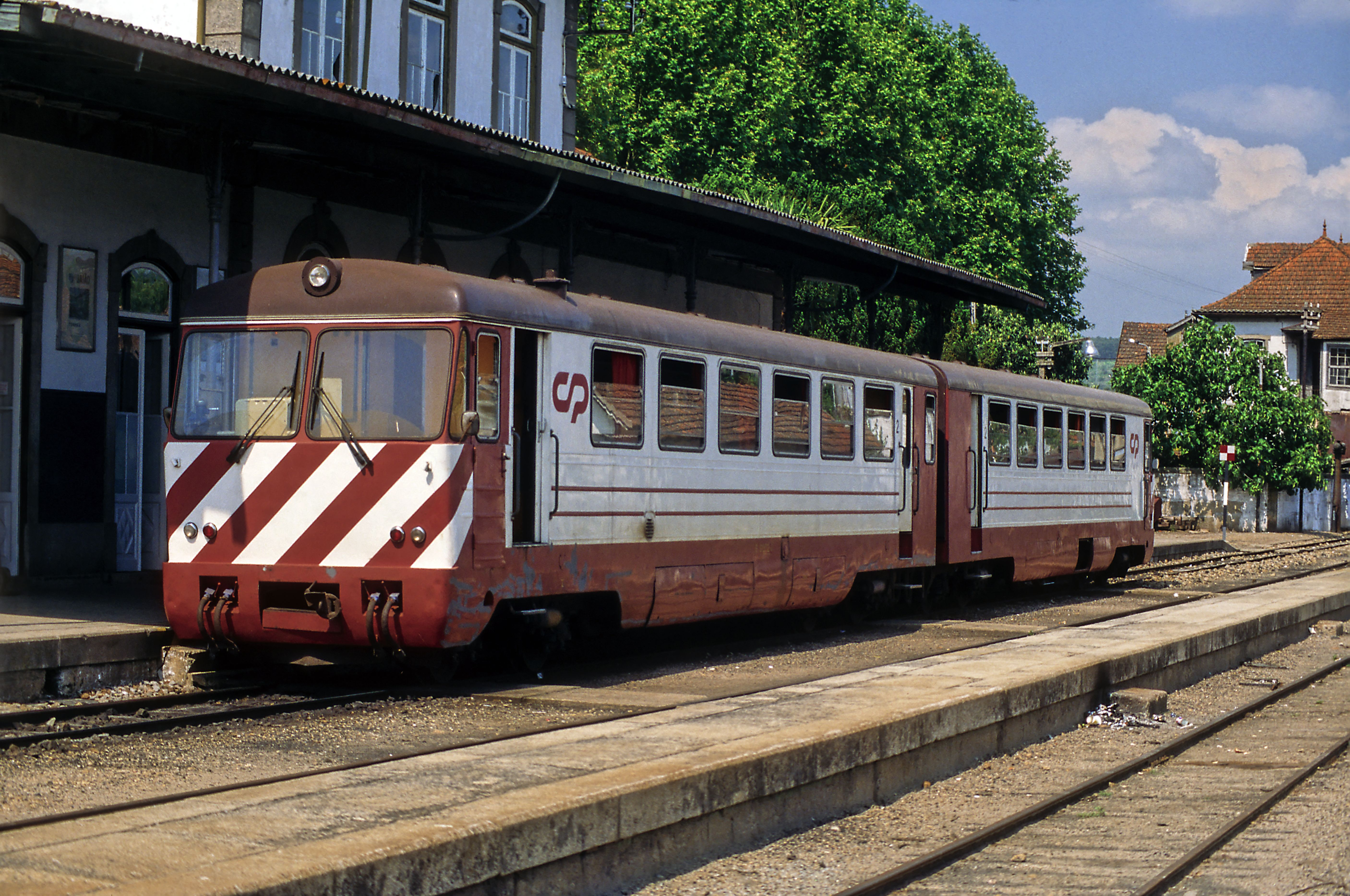
A diesel multiple unit train (secondhand from ex-Yugoslavia) of CP's Série 9700 at Vila Real station

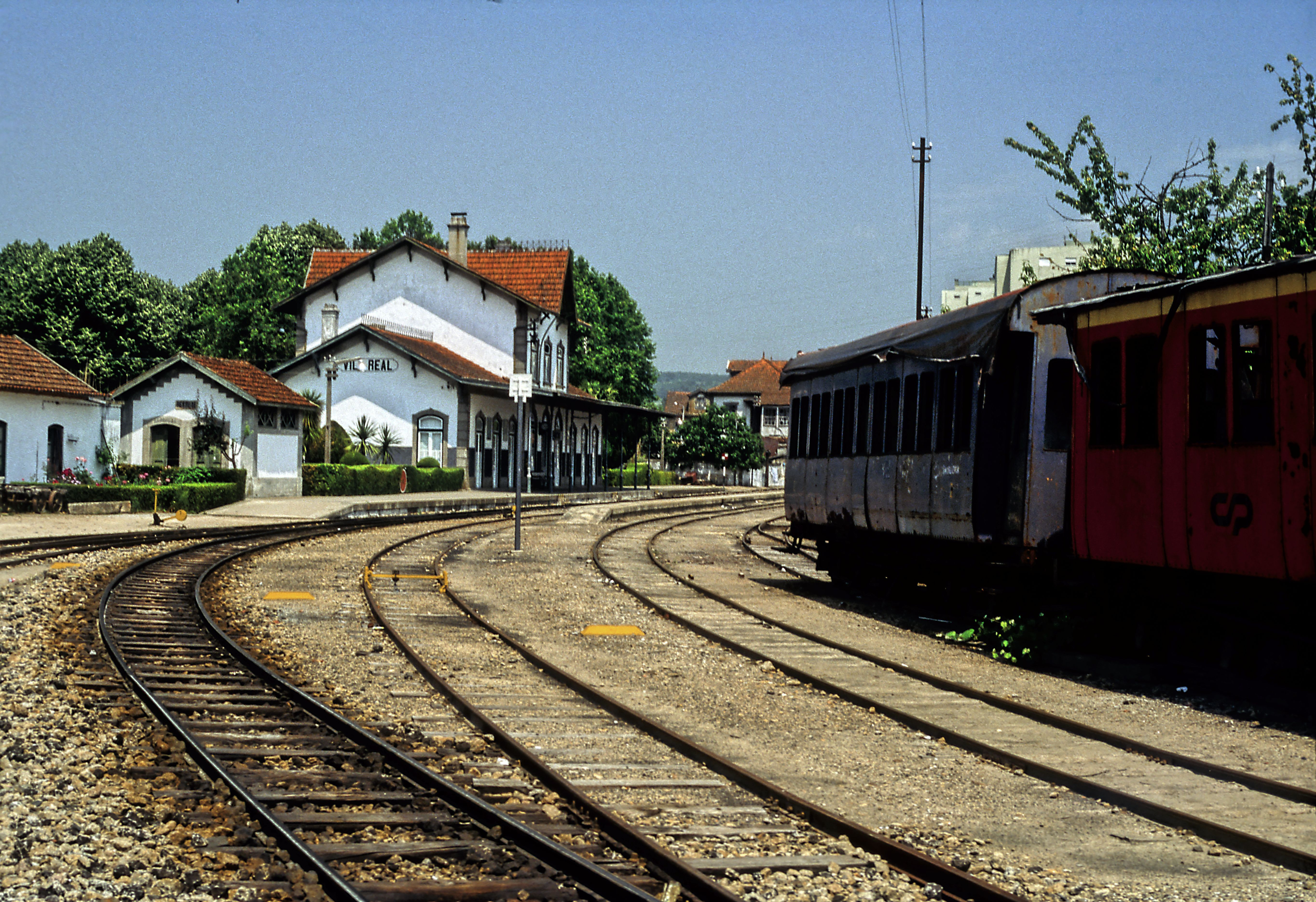
Vila Real station in 1996

== Early years ==
The section from Régua (also known as Peso da Régua) to Vila Real was 1,000 mm (3 ft 3 3/8 in) metre gauge opened in 1906. The extension to Chaves was built in stages, but not completed until 1921. The distance from Regua to Chaves was 97 kilometres. The first short section of track north from Regua was dual gauged (including a large metal girder bridge over the Corgo River), shared with the main Iberian gauge Douro railway line.

In its early years the line was operated by the CF do Estado (State Railways). Following privatisation of the CF do Estado in 1928, the line came under the Companhia Nacional (CN) until taken over by the CP in 1947. CP introduced economy measures, such as diesel railcars and eventually diesel locomotives in place of steam traction (notably a small fleet of Mallet locomotives built by Henschel).

== Final years and closure ==
The Corgo line was steam operated until the 1970s, with steam shunting engines continuing in limited use until the 1980s. The introduction of the Série 9000 and later the Série 9020 diesel locomotives replaced steam working on the line. In 1982 the line featured in an episode of the BBC television series Great Little Railways.

Due to road improvements and falling passenger numbers, the northern section of the line between Vila Real and Chaves was closed in 1990.

On 25 March 2009 the remaining service on the line (between Regua and Vila Real) was suspended due to the condition of the track. Repairs were promised and the line was expected to reopen by 2011. In practice, due to budgetary constraints, the repairs have not been forthcoming and the replacement bus service was itself withdrawn with effect from 1 January 2012. The tracks were lifted from Vila Real station by 2011.

== Other narrow gauge railways in the Douro Valley ==
- Sabor line - closed 1988
- Tâmega line - closed 2009
- Tua line - closed 2018

== See also ==
- Narrow gauge railways in Portugal
- List of railway lines in Portugal
- List of Portuguese locomotives and railcars
- History of rail transport in Portugal
