= Tua railway station =

Railway station in Portugal

Coordinates: 41°12′25.9″N 7°25′9.5″W

Tua
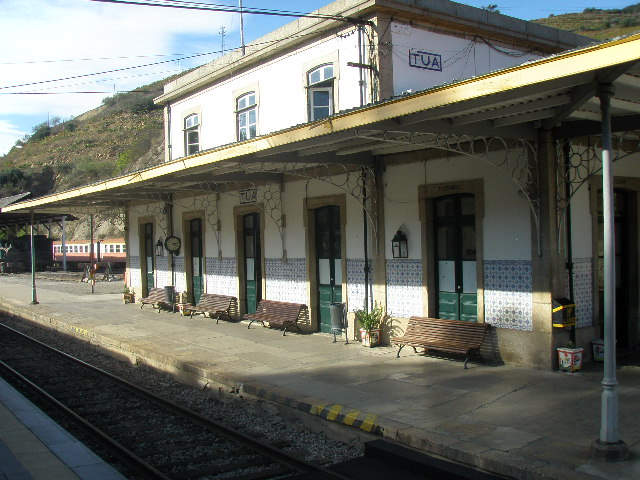
- A view of the station at Tua, with its azulejo tiles lacing the lower quarter of the building

General information
- Location: Carrazeda de Ansiães; Portugal
- Lines: Douro line (1883-present) and Tua line (1887-2008)
- Platforms: 2
- Tracks: 3

History
- Opened: 1 September 1883

Services
Preceding station	Comboios de Portugal	Following station
Pinhão towards Porto-Campanhã	InterRegional	Alegria towards Pocinho
Pinhão towards Porto-São Bento	InterRegional	Alegria towards Pocinho
Pinhão towards Régua	Regional	Alegria towards Pocinho
Location
- Location within Portugal

The Tua Railway Station (Portuguese: Estação Ferroviária do Tua) is a railway station located in the civil parish of Castanheiro do Norte e Ribalonga, in the municipality of Carrazeda de Ansiães, close to the confluence of the Douro River and the Tua River. The station is served by Comboios de Portugal (CP) main line trains on the Douro line to/from Porto.

== History ==
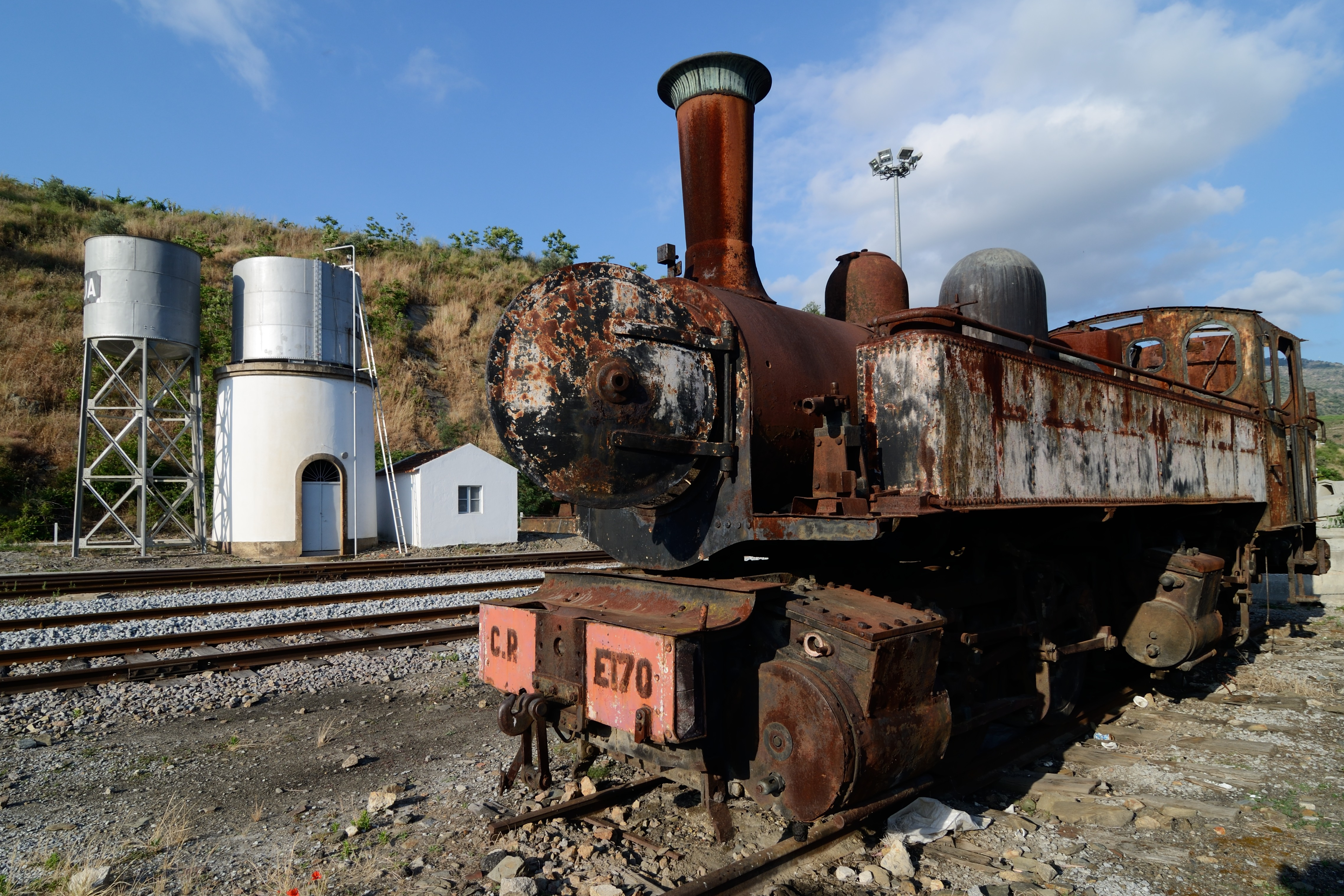
The remnants of the old locomotive were sold to an entrepreneur

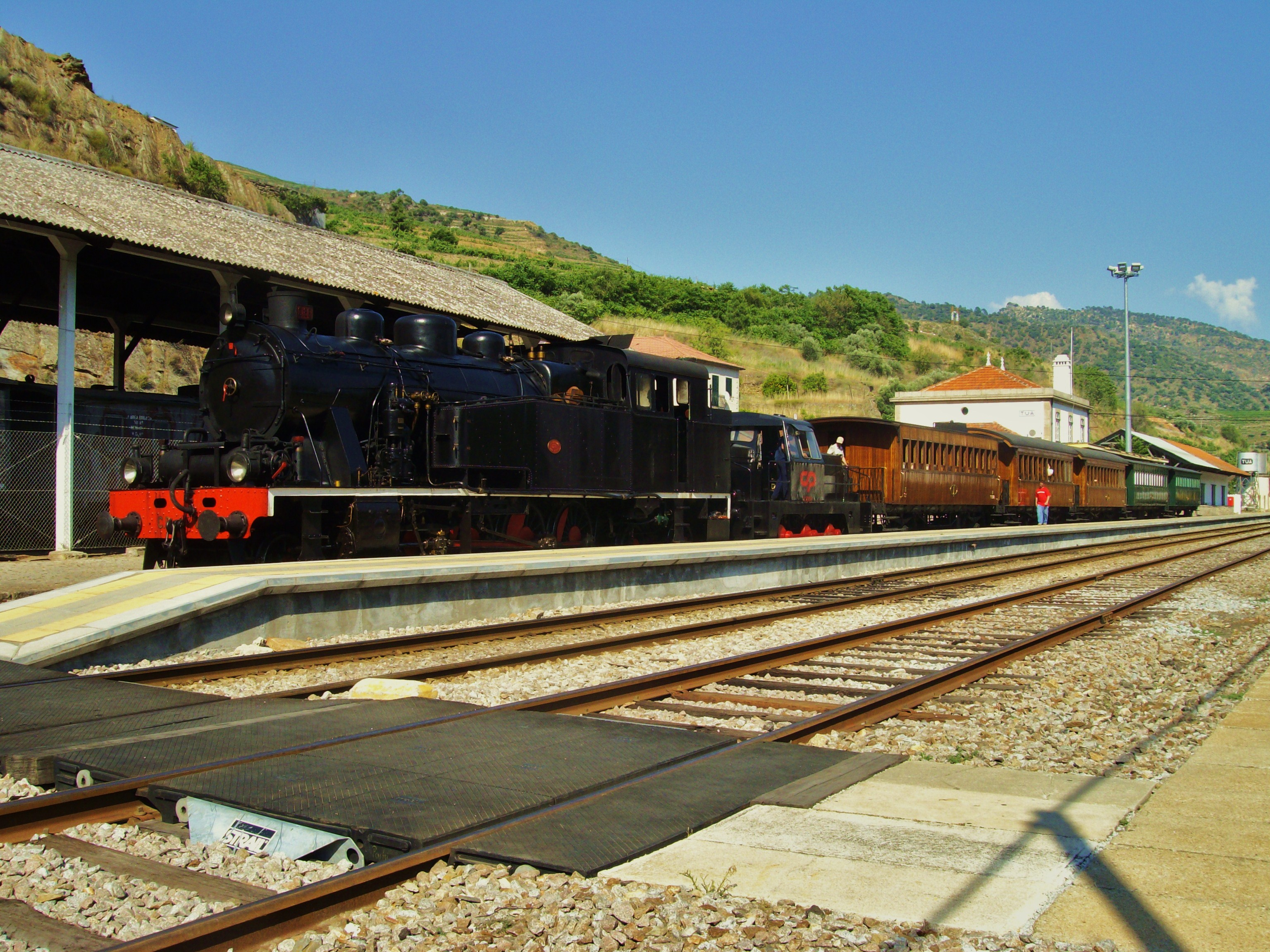
Every weekend, from March to October, a historic train runs from Régua to Tua

The station opened in 1883 as the eastern terminus of the Douro line, serving this role until the line was extended to the Spanish border in 1887.

In 1926, the Tua station served the municipalities of Vila Flor, Carrazeda de Ansiães and São João da Pesqueira, and was a test line for the Companhia Nacional para Bragança (Braganca National Company), which was of significant importance.

The line was important for transitory services of wine, wood, olive oil, cork and livestock, principally from Porto, Vila Nova de Gaia and Régua. These services consisted of exporting 2600 tons annually in refined material and receiving 14,000 tons of raw materials. In addition, the site was a passenger hub for 15000 passengers on average, especially from Porto, Régua, Lisbon, Pinhão and Ferradosa.

By 1929, it was a transshipment hub for the Foz do Tua to Bragança line, serviced by Companhia Nacional (CN), although it was one of the worst stations along the Douro line. It was formerly the junction for the scenic, narrow-gauge Tua Line between Mirandela and Bragança. The Tua Line closed in 2008.

In 2016, Comboios de Portugal decided to sell the historic locomotive stationed at the Tua station to a foreigner, a decision that generated some controversy. On 11 March, the president of the municipal council of Carrazeda de Ansiães asked that the government step in and reverse its sale.

== Architecture ==
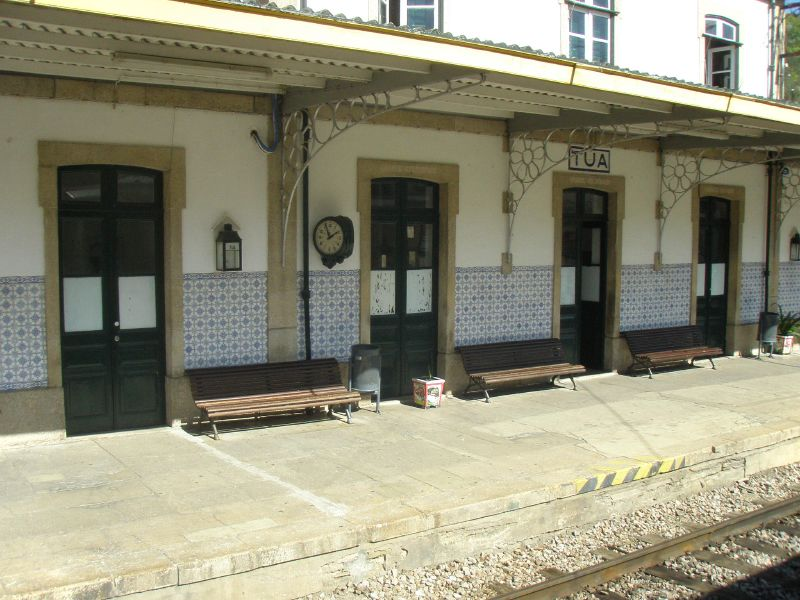
The front facade of the railway station

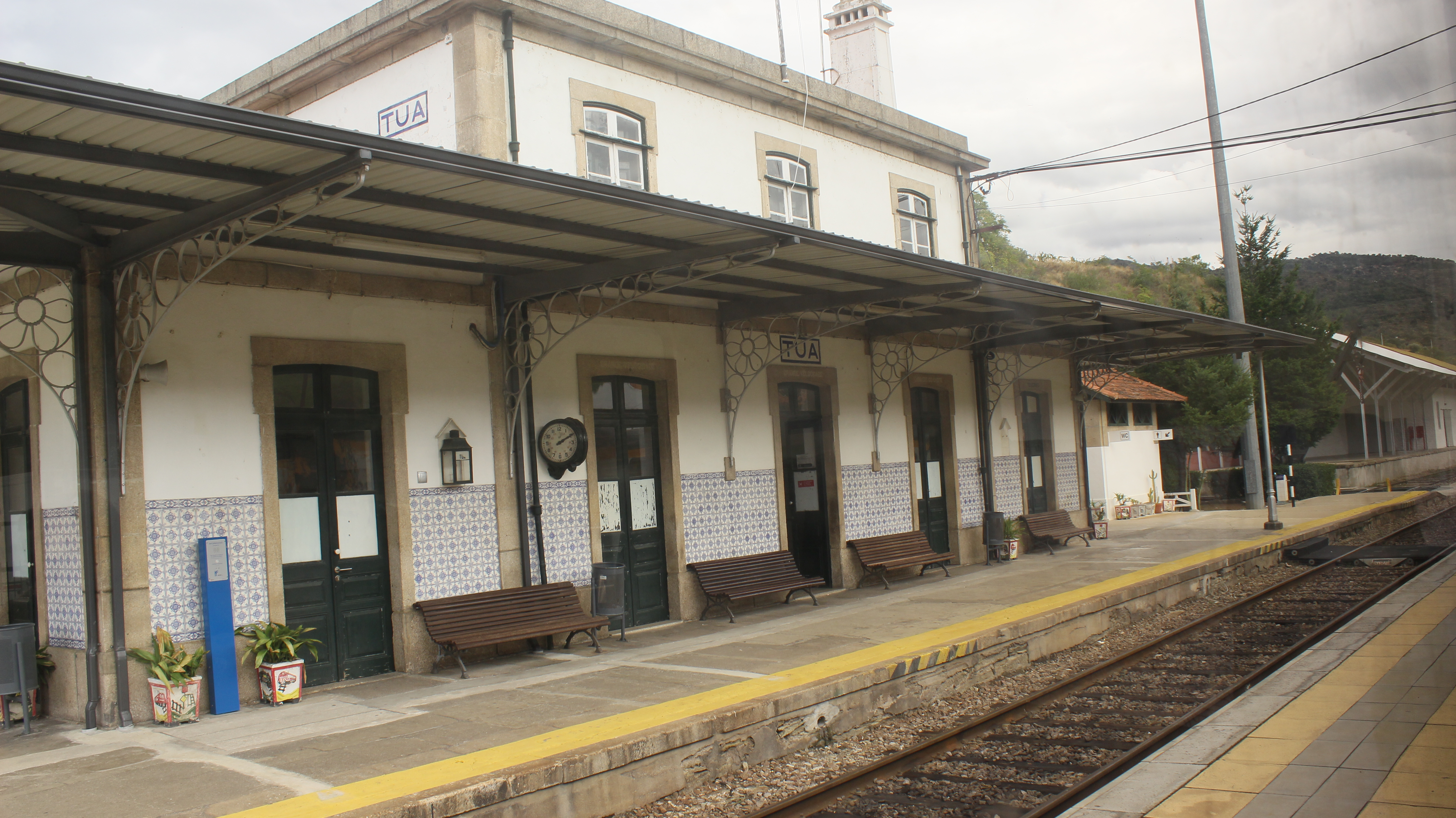
The passenger platform at the Tua station

The station is situated in an isolated position along the riverway. A little distance from the station, implanted to the east, is the old train roundhouse/terminal.

The platform is quite small; it is about 50 metres (160 ft) and is situated between a hilltop and gentle surface that descends to the riverbank. Between the station and the river is a roadway. According to a report, it was difficult (without affecting the departures at the site) to enlarge the slope side, without excavating a trench on ground of compact shales. The work would be very expensive due to the volume of excavating the material. Expanding to the riverside, requiring landfill and installation of supporting walls, would not provide enough space, because the Douro was quite close (and would result in blocking the riverway in the process. The solution at the time was to dig from the sides and side of the river, exploiting the stone and debris to build a supporting wall and embankment. In this way, the surface of the station would be widened 30 by 40 metres (98 ft × 131 ft) sufficiently for the station lines. The work required prior agreement with C.N., the Junta Autónoma das Estradas (Autonomous Roads Board) and Direcção dos Serviços Hidráulico (Hydraulic Services Directorate), and an estimated cost of 2100 contos: excavations to the rock (240 contos), supporting wall, embankment and diverting the road (1060 contos), new rail lines (140 contos), extensions of the pier and warehouses (10 contos), new platforms (140 contos), extending the building (150 contos), equipment (scales, etc.) (40 contos), fencing (20 contos), various and unforeseen tasks (200 contos).
