= Linha do Tua =

Former rail line in Portugal

Coordinates: 41.203957°N 7.420906°W

Tua line
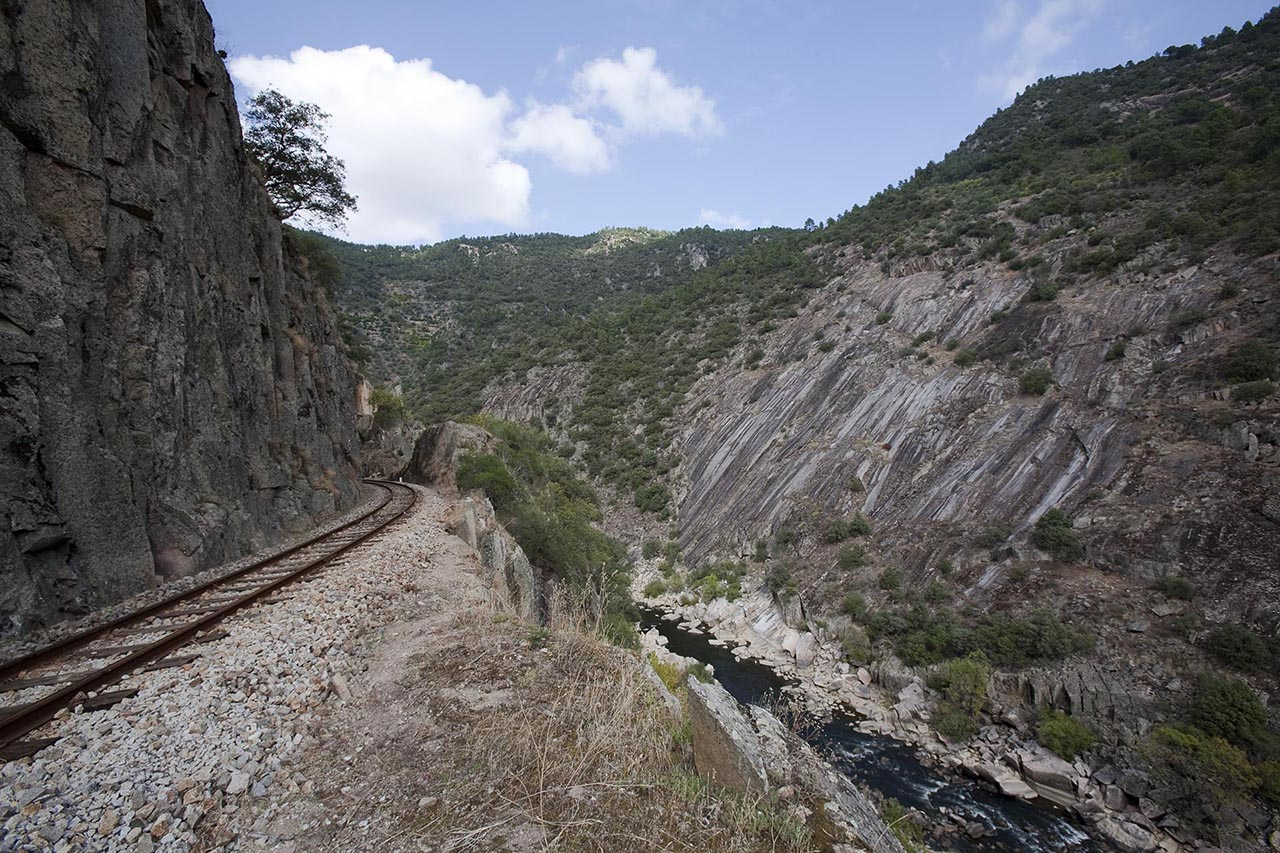
- Tua line between Foz Tua and Mirandela, along Tua River

Overview
- Native name: Linha do Tua
- Locale: Portugal
- Termini: Tua; Bragança

History
- Opened: 1887
- Closed: 2008

Technical
- Line length: 133.8 km (83.1 mi)
- Track gauge: 1,000 mm (3 ft 3 3/8 in) metre gauge

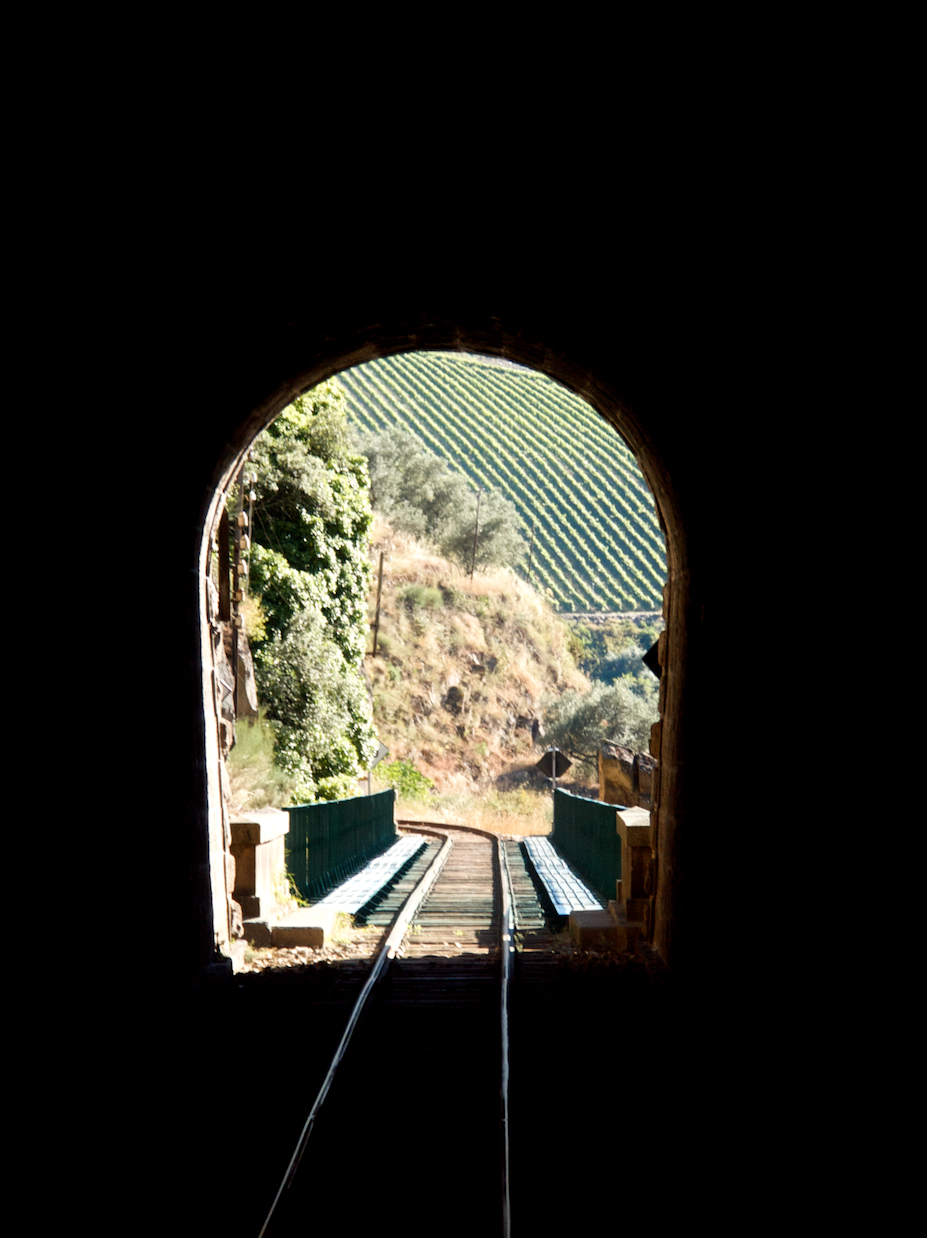
Tunnel on the Tua line

The Tua line was a metre gauge railway line in northern Portugal, which connected Tua to Bragança. The line was opened in 1887 and closed in 2018. The section from Mirandela to Brunheda is planned to be reopened in 2019.

== History ==
This highly scenic line ran north from a junction with the main Douro line at Tua Station, closely following the banks of the Tua River to the towns of Mirandela and Bragança. The railway opened in 1887. It was the first and longest (at 133.8 km) of all the narrow gauge railways built to serve the area north of the River Douro. It was originally operated by Companhia Nacional de Caminhos de Ferro (CN). From 1947 onwards, until closure, the line was operated by CP.

Trains on the line were hauled by steam locomotives for much of the line's existence. From the 1970s onwards trains on the line were hauled by CP Class 9020 diesel locomotives, which were withdrawn when the line closed. Diesel railbuses, such as the Série 9300 and finally the Série 9500, were also used on some passenger trains.

Part of the route of the Tua line was submerged in 2016 after the conclusion of Foz Tua Dam.

Other narrow gauge railways in northern Portugal included the Corgo line and the Tâmega line (both closed in 2009) and the Sabor line (closed in 1988).

== Closure ==
The northern section of the line between Mirandela and Bragança was suddenly closed in December 1991, with the closure being formalised in 1992. The southern section between Tua and Mirandela remained in use.

Most of the remaining 54 km section south of Mirandela was closed abruptly in August 2008 on grounds that emergency track repairs were necessary. This followed the derailment of a railcar near Brunheda, resulting in the death of a passenger and 25 injuries.

A twice-daily taxi service replaced the train service, but was withdrawn on 1 July 2012 thus appearing to mark the final and formal closure of the line. However, the taxi service was restarted on 9 July 2012 for a further initial three-month period, later extended indefinitely. Though actual train services had been withdrawn, it was possible to travel as a passenger with a CP ticket using the replacement road service. In May 2016 the Mirandela local authority decided to withdraw funding for the replacement road service due to financial constraints.

Budget cuts by the Portuguese Government led to a decision to permanently close the line, as announced in the Government's Strategic Transport Plan 2011–2015, published in October 2011. Actual train services were effectively withdrawn in 2008, apart from a short section around Mirandela which was operated as the Metro de Mirandela until December 2018.

== Future developments ==
As of 2018, the possibility of reopening the railway between Brunheda and Mirandela as a tourist attraction is being explored. The trackbed south of Brunheda will be submerged by the Foz Tua Dam scheme.

A visitor centre for the Tua Valley (including features on the railway line) has been developed on the former Tua line platform at Tua station.

== See also ==
- List of railway lines in Portugal
- List of Portuguese locomotives and railcars
- History of rail transport in Portugal
