= Tua River =

River in northern Portugal

Coordinates: 41.212°N 7.431°W

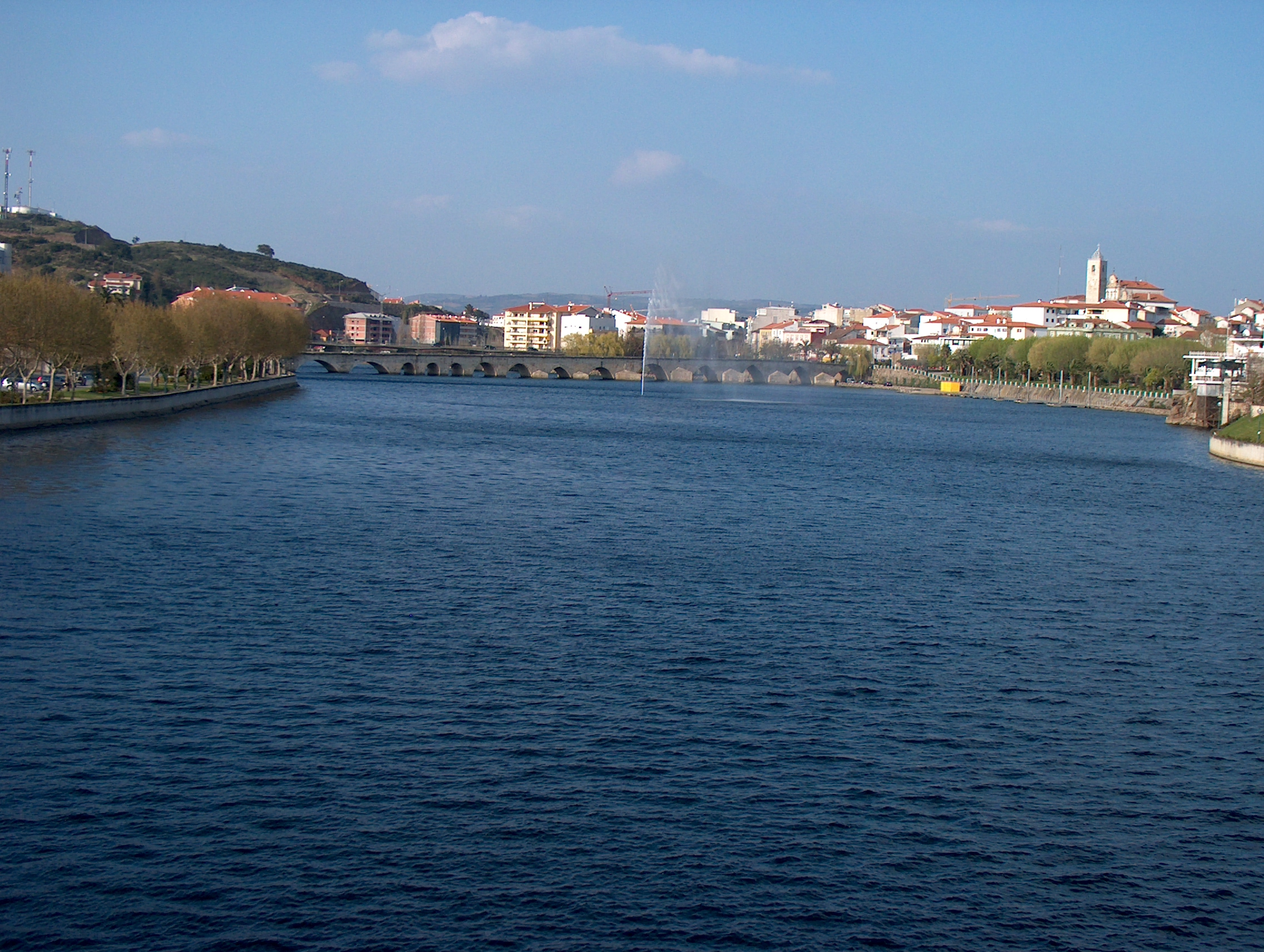
The Tua as it crosses Mirandela

Tua (Portuguese pronunciation: [ˈtuɐ]) is a river in northeastern Portugal, flowing by the border of Vila Real District and Bragança District. It is a tributary of the Douro River. The biggest and most important city it flows through is Mirandela.

The Tua line was a narrow gauge railway which closely followed the banks of the river and was closed in 2008.

In 2017 the Foz Tua project, which includes a dam built near the mouth of the Tua River (at the confluence with the Douro River), started producing energy, after a long controversial process between Portuguese government and environmental organizations.

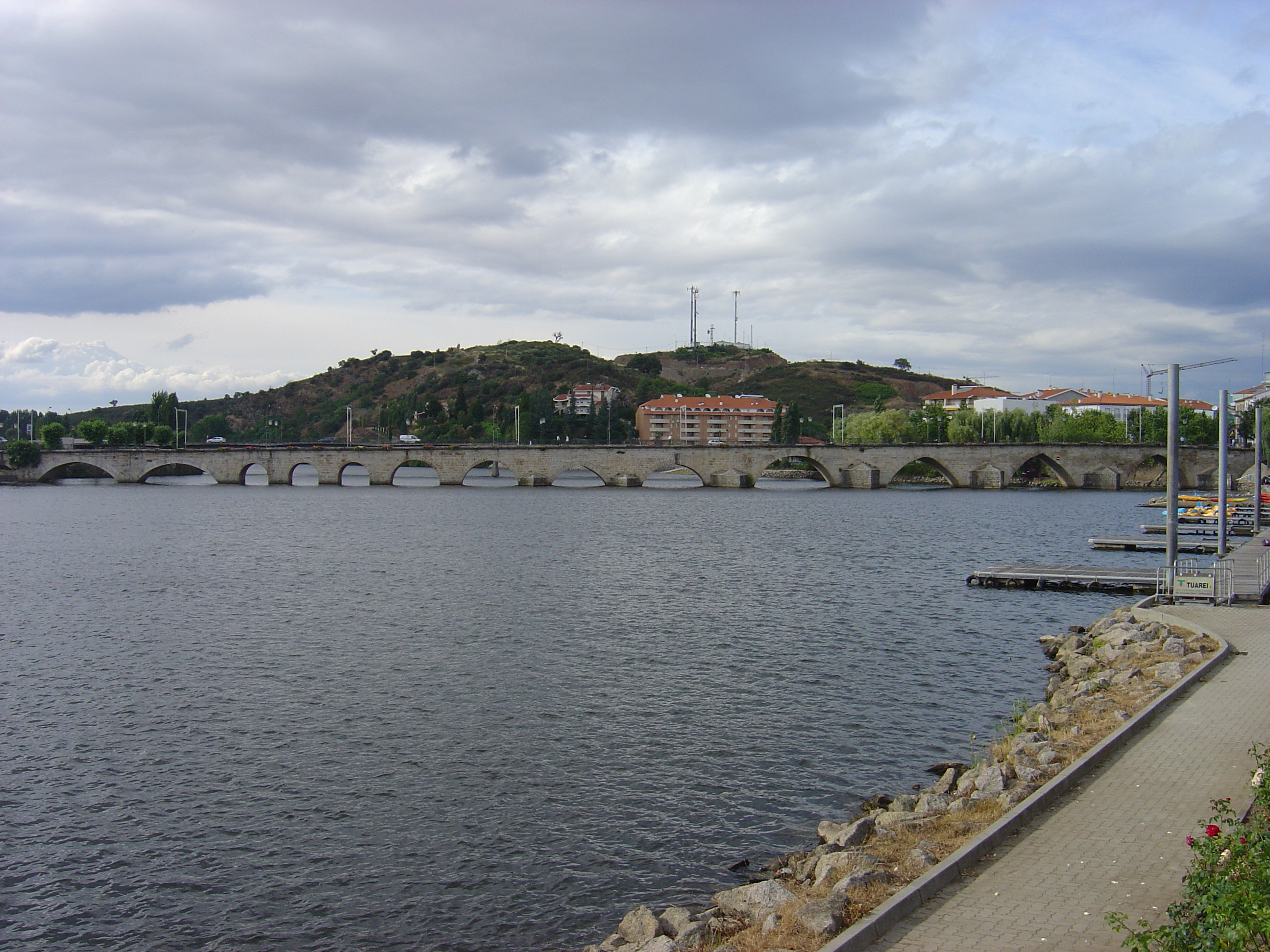
The Tua in Mirandela

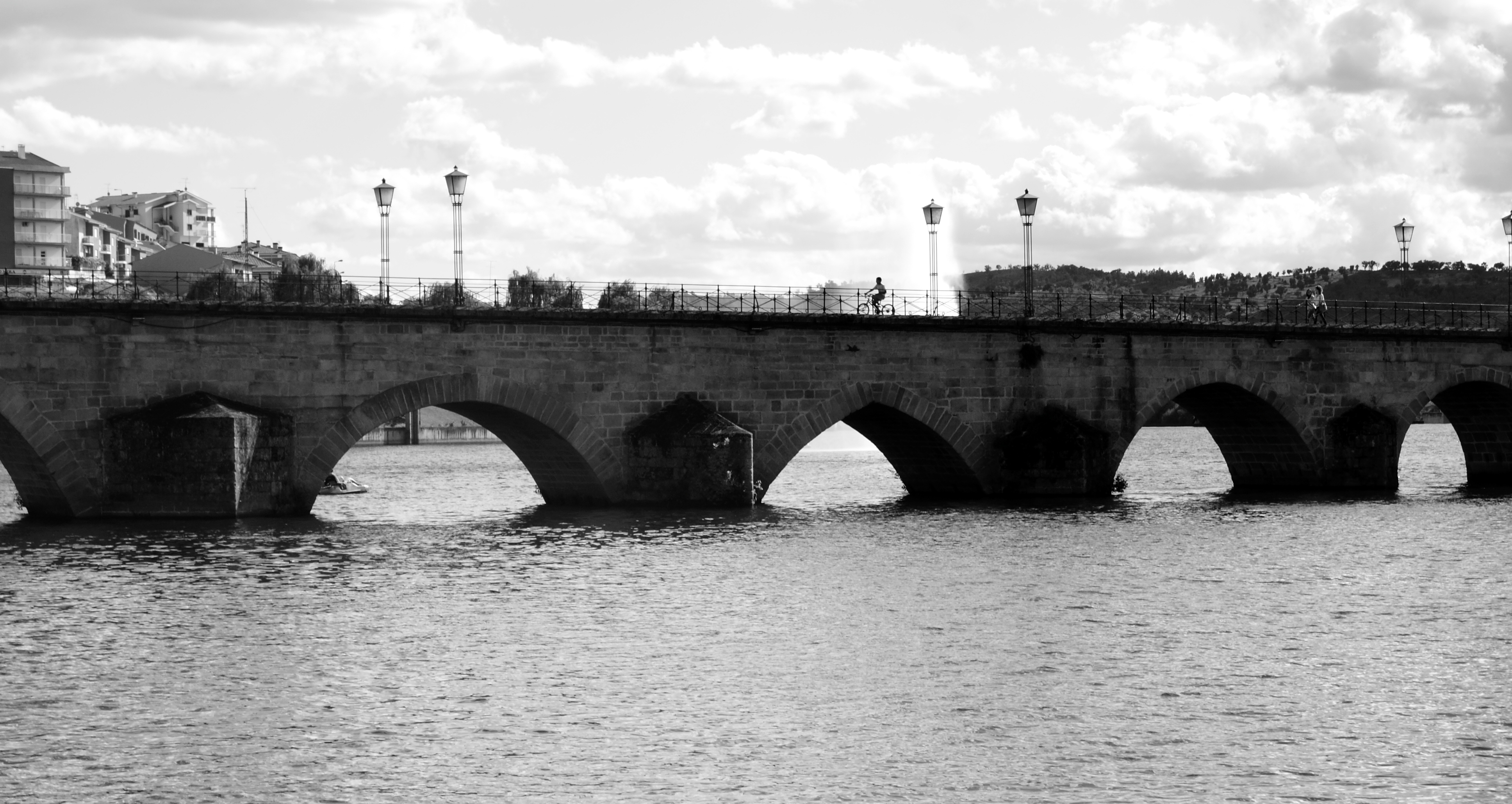
Tua River

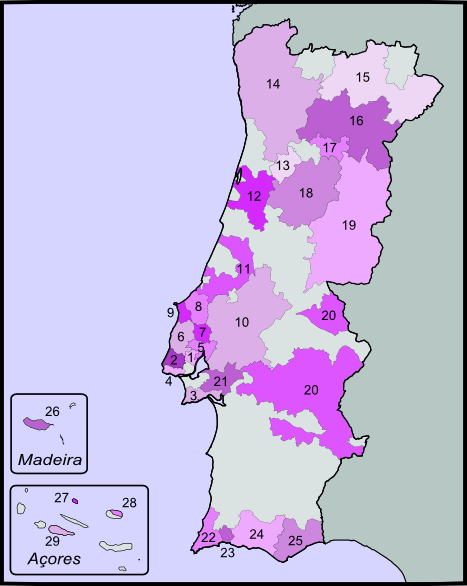
Wine Regions of Portugal

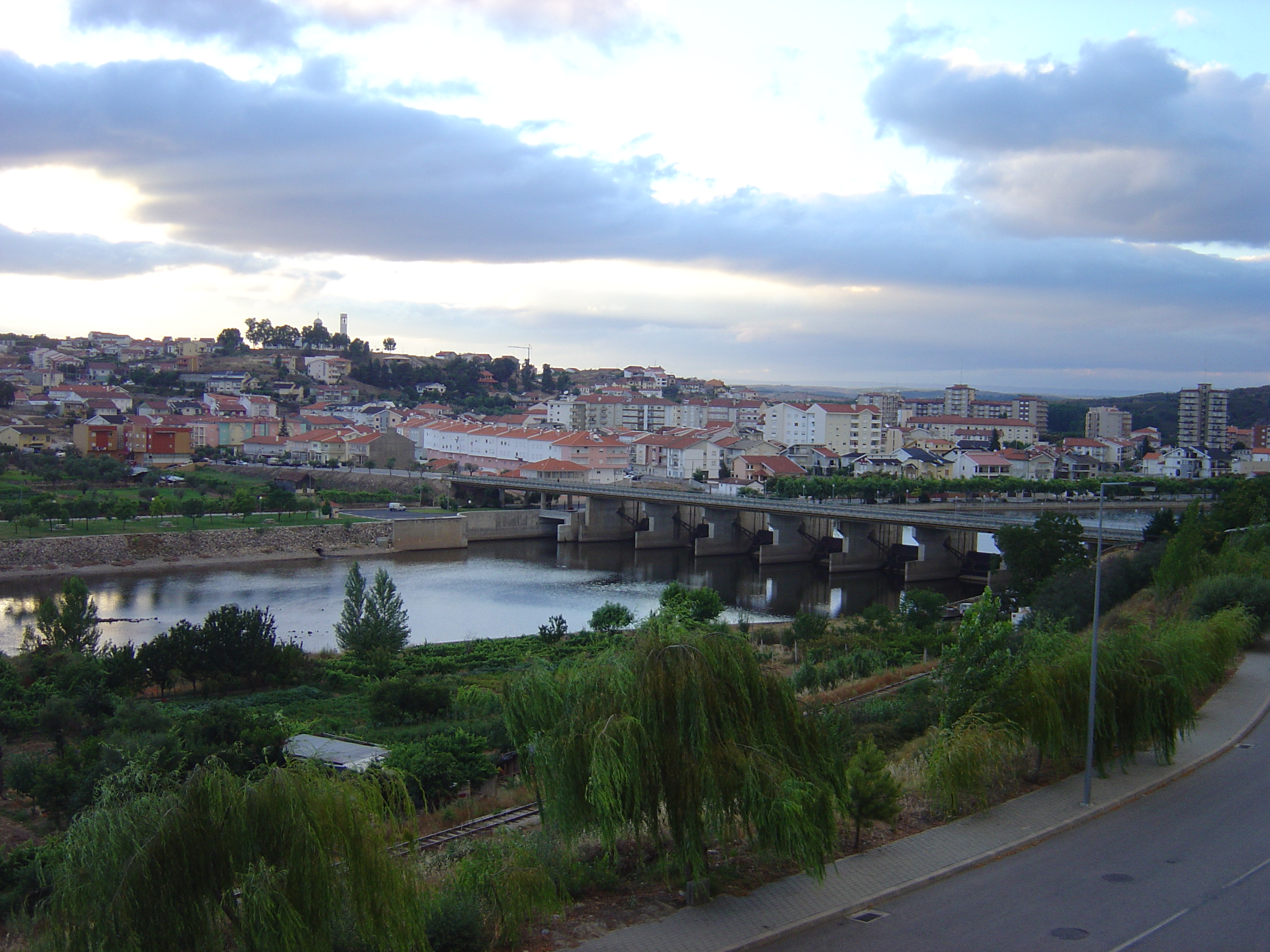
The Tua River passing near the town of Mirandela.

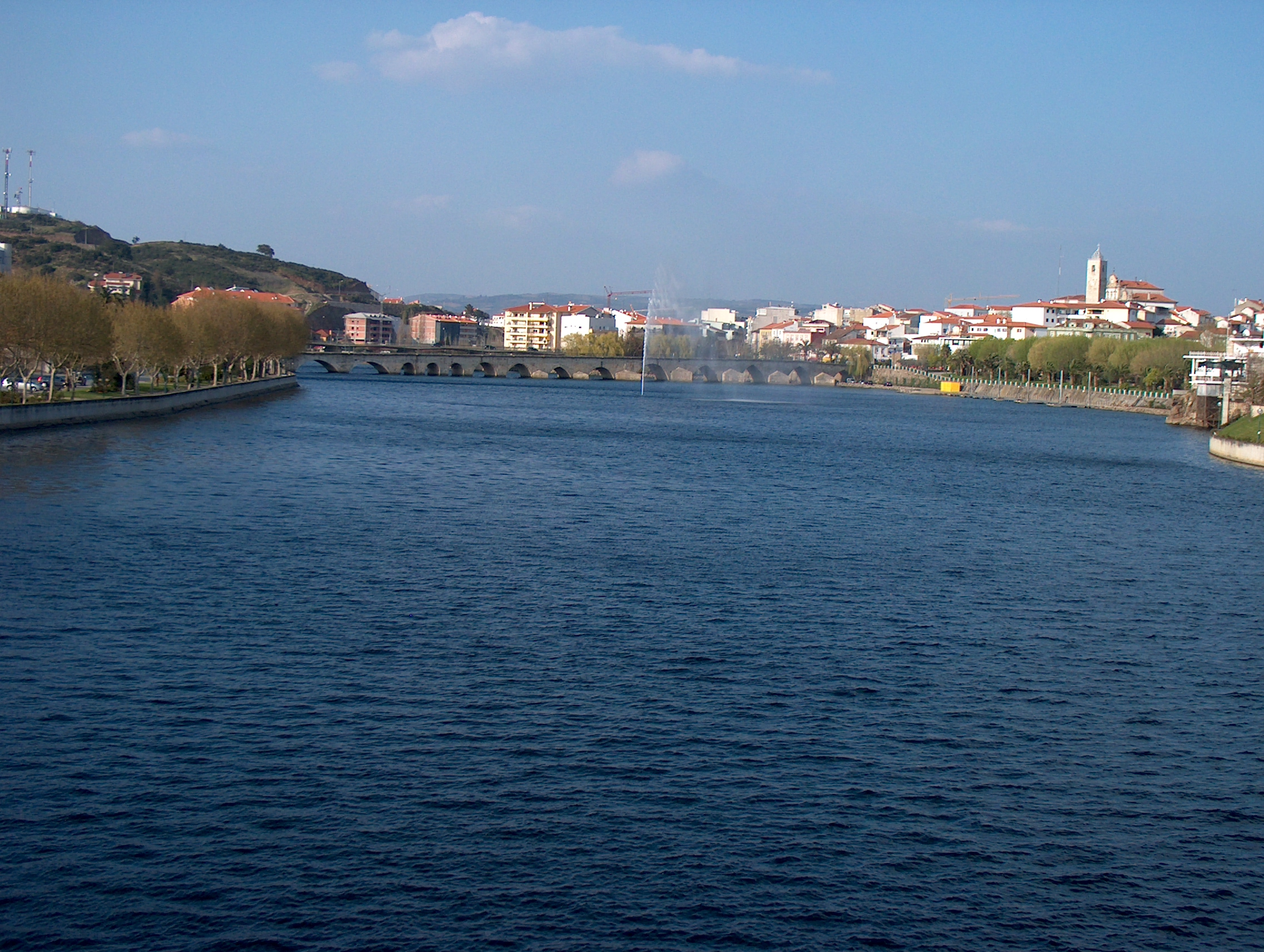
Tua River
