= List of Portuguese locomotives and railcars =

This list provides an overview of the locomotives and railcars of the Portuguese railways, that is, the traction stock of earlier private railways, the state-owned Comboios de Portugal (CP) and its predecessor, the municipal Metropolitano Ligeiro de Mirandela and the two private transport companies Fertagus and Takargo Rail.

== Broad gauge steam locomotives ==
=== Companhia Central e Peninsular dos Caminhos de Ferro em Portugal (CCeP) ===
Originally 1440 mm gauge; taken over by the Companhia Real dos Caminhos de Ferro Portugueses in 1857; regauged to 1672 mm in 1860.

Number	First Name	CP No.	Type	Manufacturer	Year(s) made	Notes
1	Portugal	—	1A1	Alcard & Buddicom ?	?	
2–3	Santarem, Badajoz		1A1	R & W Hawthorn	1854	
4	Elvas		1A1	William Fairbairn & Sons	1855	
5–7	Lisboa, Porto and Azambuja		1A1	Société l'Expansion	1845–1846	ex Compagnie du chemin de fer de Paris à Orléans
8–9	Camoes and Madrid		B	Dodds	?	
10	Coimbra		1B	Egestorff	1855	Sold to CP in 1856
11–14	Alamquer, ?, ?, Estremoz	5–7	1A1 t	William Fairbairn & Sons	1856–1857	Estremoz sold to MD in 1874
15–16	Setubal and Castado	101–102	C	Sharp, Stewart & Company	1861	

=== South Eastern of Portugal Railway (SEPR) ===
==== 1440 mm gauge ====
Built by British investors; also known by its Portuguese name Companhia dos Caminhos de Ferro do Sul e Sueste (SeS). Regauged to 1672 mm in 1869; nationalised and renamed Caminhos de Ferro do Estado (CFE) in 1869

Number	First Name	Number from 1873	CP No.	Type	Manufacturer	Year(s) made	Notes
1–7	Barreiro, ?, ?, ?, ?, ?, Evora	05–07		1B t	EB Wilson & Company, Manning Wardle	1856–1859	
8	D. Luiz	01	1001	1A1	Beyer, Peacock & Company 328	1862	Preserved in the Santarem Museum
9	Ourique	34	1134	C	Beyer, Peacock & Company 244	1861	
10–15	Alentejo, ?, ?, ?, ?, Algerva	08–13		B1	Beyer, Peacock & Company 322–327	1863	

==== 1672 mm gauge ====
Number	First Name	CP No.	CP No. from 1950	Type	Manufacturer	Year(s) made	Notes
SeS 02 to 04	Crato, Estremoz and Faro	01002–01004		C t	James Cross & Company	1865	
14–31, 34–53		1114–1131, 1134–1153	41–79	C	Hanomag, Neilson & Company, Beyer, Peacock & Company, Grafenstaden, Sharp, Stewart & Company	1861–1902	
61–66		1261–1266	281–286	2′C	Henschel & Son	1910	
71–72		BeDymf 1001–1002		(Bh2)'2' also (Bn2)'2'	Borsig	1906	Steam railcars
81–99		1281–1289, 1292–1299	221–237	2′C n4v	Borsig, Esslingen	1903–1923	90: Contumil
101–119		1701–1719	701–719	1′D h2	Berliner Maschinenbau, North British Locomotive Company	1912–1921	
151–158		1161–1168	141–148	C	Henschel & Son	1928	
201–206		1201–1206	291–296	2′C	Henschel & Son	1913	204: Vila Nova de Gaia
301–310		1501–1510	551–560	2′C1′	Henschel & Son	1924	303: Santarem
401–410		01201–01210	0181–0190	1′D2′ t	Henschel & Son	1924	404, 410: Vila Nova de Gaia, 406: Regua, 407: Entroncamento

=== Caminhos de Ferro Estado Minho e Douro (MD) ===
1672 mm gauge

Origin	Number	First name	Later number	CP No.	CP No. from 1950	Type	Manufacturer	Year(s) made	Notes
	1–4	Porto, Braga, Ave, Lima		2001–2004		1B	Beyer, Peacock & Company 1466–69	1875	
	5–6	Viana, Valença		2005–2006,		1B	Beyer, Peacock & Company 1790–71	1878	
CF Douro 1–3	8–10	Bragança, Villa Real, Regua		2008–2010	9	1B	Beyer, Peacock & Company 1470–72	1875	9: Nine
MZA 21, 23, 25, 30	11–12		47–48	2047–2048		1B	Sharp, Stewart & Company	1855	
CCeP 14	13		49	02049		1A1 t	William Fairbairn & Sons	1854	Nine
	12–13 (2nd)	Famalicão, Nina,		02012–02013		1B t	Beyer, Peacock & Company 4583–84	1904	
	14 (2nd)	Mirangaïa		02014		1B t	Beyer, Peacock & Company 3855	1896	
	15–16	Vizella, Mira		02015–02016		1B t	Beyer, Peacock & Company 1797–98	1878	
	17–18	Fox, ?		02017–02018	011–012	C1 t	Hanomag 3807–08	1902	
	19–20	?, Leca		02019–02020	013–014	C1 t	Beyer, Peacock & Company 3021–22	1889	
	5–7	Douro, ?, Tua	21–23	2121–2123	21–23	C	Beyer, Peacock & Company 1473–75	1875	7: Valença
	24–28	?, ?, ?, ?, ?		2124–2128	24–38	C	Beyer, Peacock & Company 1792–96	1878	7: Valença
	29–30	?, ?		2129–2130	29–30	C	Beyer, Peacock & Company 2114–15	1881	
	31–32	?, Aqueda		2130–2132	30–32	C	Beyer, Peacock & Company 2809–10	1887	
SeS	11–13 (2nd), 14	Geres, ?, ?, Tamel	33–36	2133–2136		C	Sharp, Stewart & Company	1875	
	37–39	Chaves, ?, ?		2187–2189	175–177	C1	Beyer, Peacock & Company 3856–58	1897	
	40–41	?, Penafiel		2190–2191	178–179	C1	Hanomag 3805–06	1902	
	51–56			2251–2256	238–243	2′C n4v	Borsig 5359–64	1904	51: Entroncamento,
	57–60			2257–2260	244–247	2′C n4v	John Cockerill & Cie 2606–09	1907	
SeS	61			2261	248	2′C n4v	Borsig 5620	1906	Contumil
SeS	62			2262	249	2′C n4v	Esslingen 3449	1908	
	63–65			2263–2265	250–252	2′C n4v	Borsig 11679–81	1923	
	81–82			02081–02082	041–042	1′C1 t	John Cockerill & Cie 2610–11	1907	82: Entroncamento
	101–103			2701–2703	751–753	1′D h2	North British Locomotive Company 19335–37	1912	
	104–106			2704–2706	754–756	1′D h2	Berliner Maschinenbau 5239–41	1913	104: Entroncamento
	107–116			2707–2716	757–766	1′D h2	Berliner Maschinenbau 8264–73	1924	

=== Companhia dos Caminhos de Ferro Portugueses da Beira Alta (BA) ===
1672 mm gauge; absorbed by Companhia dos Caminhos de Ferro Portugueses in 1947.

Number	No. after 1925–30 rebuilding	CP No. from 1948	CP No. from 1950	Type	Manufacturer	Year(s) made	Notes
1–8	11–16	108–109	61–62, 141–144	C n2	Schneider	1879	
21–28		24–27		1B n2	Wiener Neustadt	1881	
51–55		281–285	201–205	2C	Henschel & Son	1909	
61–65		291–295	211–215	2C	Henschel & Son	1924	61: Pampilhosa
101–103			801–803	2′D	Henschel & Son	1930	101: Vilar Formosa
BA 201–202			859–860	1′D1′	American Locomotive Company	1945	855 - Entroncamento

=== Companhia Real dos Caminhos de Ferro Portugueses (CP) ===
Renamed Companhia dos Caminhos de Ferro de Portugueses in 1910. 1672 mm gauge

Origin	First name	CP No. until 1927	CP No. from 1927	CP No. from 1950	Type	Manufacturer	Year(s) made	Notes
	Amalia Rodrigues, Deolinda Rodrigues and Balalaika	1–4	001–004	001–004	B n2t	Hartmann, John Cockerill & Cie	1882, 1890	1: Estremoz, 2: Nine, 3–4: Entroncamento
	Maria Alice	5	005	005	B t	John Cockerill & Cie	1901	Estremoz
		01–08	01–08	01–08	C n2t	Esslingen	1887	
MD 17–20	Fox, ?, ?, Leca		02017–02020	011–014	C1 t	Beyer, Peacock & Company 3021–22, Hanomag	1889, 1902	012: Entroncamento, 013: Lagos, 014: Nine
		09–026	09–026	021–029	C1 t	Beyer, Peacock & Company	1890–1891	020: Entroncamento; remainder rebuilt as 031–039
rebuilt from 011–025		031–039	031–039	031–039	1C1 t	Beyer, Peacock & Company	1890–1891	033: Lagos
MD 81–82			02081–02082	041–042	1C1 t	John Cockerill & Cie	1907	042: Entroncamento
		071–085	070–097	070–097	1′C2′ t	SLM, Henschel & Son, CP Lisbon workshops	1916–1944	070: Estremoz, 072: Porto, 094: Entroncamento
		051–058	0151–0158	0151–0158	1′D1′ h2t	Berliner Maschinenbau	1913, 1920	
CFE 401–410			01201–01210	0181–0190	1′D2′ t	Henschel & Son	1924	0184, 0190: Vila Nova de Gaia, 0186: Regua, 0187: Entroncamento
		0101–0124	0201–0224	0201–0224	1D2 t	Henschel & Son	1924	0201: Entroncamento
CCeP 11–13	Alamquer, Leiria and Vila Franca	5–7			1A1	William Fairbairn & Sons	1857	
MD 1–10	Porto, …, Regua		2001–2010	3–10	1B	Beyer, Peacock & Company	1875, 1878	9: Nine
		17–37	17–37		1B n2	Evra, Schneider	1861, 1864	23–31: Manufacturer unknown
MD 21–32	Douro, …, Aqueda		2121–2132	21–32	C	Beyer, Peacock & Company	1875–1887	23: Valença
		41–52	41–52		2′B n2	Hartmann, Société Alsacienne de Constructions Mécaniques, John Cockerill & Cie	1879–1890	
CFE 14–31			1114–1131	41–54	C	Hanomag, Neilson & Company	1885–1895	
BA 3, 8			108–109	61–62	C n2	Schneider	1879	
CFE 34–53			1134–1153	71–79	C	Beyer, Peacock & Company, Grafenstaden, Sharp, Stewart & Company, Hanomag	1861–1902	
		81–84	81–84		2′B	Beyer, Peacock & Company	1889	
		91–98	91–98		2′B	Beyer, Peacock & Company	1891	
		101–135	103–135	110, 113–118, 120, 124–125, 127–128, 131–135	C	Sharp, Stewart & Company, Evra, Kitson & Company, Graffenstaden, Batignolles, Köchlin, Hartmann	1861–1881	135: Entroncamento
CFE 151–158			1161–1168	141–148	C	Henschel & Son	1928	
		151–172	152–159, 161–162, 164–168, 171–172	152–159, 161–162, 164–168, 171–172	C	Société Alsacienne de Constructions Mécaniques, John Cockerill & Cie	1887–1890	remainder rebuilt as 182–186; 167: Entroncamento
MD 37–41	Chaves, …, Penafiel		2187–2191	175–179	C1	Beyer, Peacock & Company, Hanomag	1897, 1902	
CP 151, 160, 163, 169–170		181–186	181–186	181–186	1C	CP Lisbon workshops	1910	rebuilt
CFE 81–99, MD 51–65			1281–1299, 2251–2265	221–252	2′C n4v	Borsig, Esslingen, John Cockerill & Cie	1903–1923	238: Entroncamento, 248: Contumil
		61–72	261–272	261–272	2′C	Fives Lille	1899–1904	262: Entroncamento
SeS 61–66			1261–1266	281–286	2′C	Henschel & Son	1910	282: Vila Nova de Gaia
SeS 201–206			1201–1206	291–296	2′C	Henschel & Son	1913	294: Vila Nova de Gaia
		301–305	366–370	301–305	2′C	Société Alsacienne de Constructions Mécaniques	1905	
		351–365	351–365	351–365	2C	Henschel & Son	1911–1913	357: Entroncamento
		401–406	401–406	401–406	2C	JA Maffei	1908	
		601–608	501–508	501–508	2′C1	Henschel & Son	1925	
CFE 301–310			1501–1510	551–560	2′C1	Henschel & Son	1924	553: Santarem
		201–214	601–614	601–614	D	Société Alsacienne de Constructions Mécaniques	1887–1890	
CFE 101–119			1701–1719	701–719	1′D h2t	Berliner Maschinenbau, North British Locomotive Company	1912–1921	701: Vila Nova de Gaia
MD 101–116			2701–2716	751–766	1′D h2t	North British Locomotive Company, Berliner Maschinenbau	1912–1924	754: Entroncamento
Origin	First name		CP No. from 1948	CP No. from 1950	Type	Manufacturer	Year(s) made	Notes
BA 51–55			281–285	201–205	2′C	Henschel & Son	1909	
BA 61–65			291–295	211–215	2′C	Henschel & Son	1924	211: Pampilhosa
BA 101–103			801–803	801–803	2′D h4v	Henschel & Son	1930	801: Vilar Formosa
				831–836	2′D h2	MTM (2), Babcock & Wilcox (2), Macosa (2)	1947	
BA 201–202			851–860, 1851–1856, 2851–2856	851–872	1D1	American Locomotive Company	1945	855: Entroncamento
		501	951		CC	CP Lisbon workshops		

== Narrow Gauge Steam Locomotives ==
=== Companhia dos Caminhos de Ferro do Norte de Portugal (NP) ===
1000 mm gauge

Origin	NP No.	CP No.	UIC-No.	Type	Manufacturer	Year(s) made	Notes
PPF 7–9		E 31–E 33		C n2t	Fives Lille	1876–1890	Originally 900 mm gauge
CF Guimaraes 1–3	21–23	E 11–E 13			Hudswell Clarke	1882	
PPF 10–11		E 61–E 62		C1 n2t	Krauss (Munich)	1897	Originally 900 mm gauge
CF Guimaraes 4–5	24–25	E 71–E 72		1C n2t	SLM	1884	
PPF 14–15	31–32	E 151–E 152		B′B n4vt	Henschel & Son	1905	E 151: Lousado museum
PPF 16–17	41–42	E 181–E 182	3 079 181-6 – 182-4	(1'B)C2	Henschel & Son	1923	E 181: Macinhata Museum
CF Guimaraes 6–8	51–53	E 101–E 103	3 059 101-8 – 103-4	1′C n2t	Esslingen	1907	E 101: Lousado museum
	101–104	E 141–E 144	3 079 141-0 – 144-4	1′D1′ h2t	Henschel	1931	E 143: Santarem aufg., E 144: Mus. Lousado museum

=== Companhia National de Caminhos de Ferro (CN) ===
1000 mm gauge

Origin	First Name	CN-No.	CP No.	UIC-No.	Type	Manufacturer	Year(s) made	Notes
Linha do Dão	Beira Alta	1–6	E 51–E 56	3 059 051-5, 3 059 054-2 – 056-4	C n2t	Kessler	1889	E 52: Macinhata aufg., E 55: Mus. Bragança museum, E 54: Darque (Santoinho)
Linha do Tua	Tras-Os-Montes	11–16	E 81–E 86	3 069 081-0 – 083-6	1′C n2t	Kessler	1886	E 81, E 82: Bragança museum, E 83: Lousado aufg., E 86: Macinhata aufg.
	Vilalva	21–24	E 111–E 114	3 089 111-1, 3 089 113-7 – 114-5	1C t	Kessler	1904, 1908	E 111: Macinhata aufg., E 113, E 114: Sernada aufg.

=== Caminhos de Ferro do Estado Minho e Douro (MD) ===
1000 mm gauge

MD No.	CP No.	UIC-No.	Type	Manufacturer	Year(s) made	Notes
201	E 1	3 049 001-3	B n2t	Henschel & Son	1922	Peso da Regua aufg.
301	E 41	3 039 041-1	C t	Hohenzollern Locomotive Works	1904	Chaves museum
401–410	E 161–E 170	3 069 161-0 – 166-9, 168-5 – 170-1	B'B n4vt	Henschel & Son	1905, 1908	tw. in museums, tw. abg., tw. in service
451–466	E 201–E 216	3 079 201-2, 203-8 – 216-0	1'BC n4vt	Henschel & Son	1911–1923	tw. in museums, tw. abg., tw. in service

=== Companhia de Caminho de Ferro do Valle de Vouga (VV) ===
1000 mm gauge

VV No..	CPNo.	UIC No.	Type	Manufacturer	Year(s) made	Notes
1–7	E 91–E 97	3 059 092-9, 094-5, 096-0 – 097-8	1C t	Orenstein & Koppel, Decauville	1910	E 91: Porto museum; E 92: Pocinho vorh.; E 96: MVTS, France; Pocinho vorh.; E 97: Sernada vorh.
12–13	E 21–E 22		C n2t	Corpet-Louvet	1904, 1907	E 21: Sernada vorh., E 22: Macinhata aufg.
21–24	E 121–E 124	3 059 121-6 – 124-0	2′C n2t	Borsig	1908	E 121, E 123: Macinhata aufg., E 122: Lousado museum, E 124: Torredeita aufg.
31–33	E 131–E 133	3 089 131-9 – 132-7	1'D1' h2t	Henschel & Son	1924	E 131, E 132: Macinhata museum

=== Porto - Povoa e Famalicão (PPF) ===
900 mm gauge

PPF No.	NP No.	CP No.	UIC No.	Type	Manufacturer	Year(s) made	Notes
1–2					Vulcan	1875	
3–6					Black, Hawthorn & Co.	1874	6: Lousado museum
7–9		E 31–E 33		C n2t	Fives Lille	1876, 1890	
10–11		E 61–E 62		C1 n2t	Krauss (Munich)	1897	
12–13				1B t	Ateliers de Tubize	1888	
14–15	31–32	E 151–E 152		B′B n4vt	Henschel & Son	1905	
16–17	41–42	E 181–E 182	3 079 181-6 – 182-4	(1′B)C2	Henschel & Son	1923	E 181: Macinhata museum

== Electric Locomotives ==
Image	Class	Model	Manufacturer	Year(s) made	Service	Notes
	2500		Sorefame/Alstom	1956	Freight	
	2550		Sorefame/Alstom	1963	Freight	Similar to 2500-series. Units 2552, 2567 and 2570 had the same appearance as the 2500's
	2600		Alstom/MTE	1974/1987	Long distance and regional; formerly freight	
	2620		Sorefame/Alstom	1987	Long distance and regional; formerly freight	Same exterior as 2600-class; Similar to SNCF Class BB 15000;
	4700		Siemens	on order	Freight	Based on Siemens EuroSprinter
	5600		Siemens	1993	Long-distance and Freight	Same as Renfe Class 252

== Diesel Locomotives ==
Image	Class	Model	Manufacturer	Year(s) made	Service	Notes
	1000		Drewry	1948	Shunting	1002 Preserved at FMNF Remainder scrapped
	1020		Gaston Moyse	1968	Shunting	All scrapped
	1050		Gaston Moyse	1955	Shunting	1056 and 1067 stored Remainder scrapped
	1100		General Electric	1949	Shunting	1104 Preserved at FMNF Remainder scrapped
	1150		Sentinel Sorefame	1966/67	Shunting	1154 and 1184 Preserved at FMNF Some Operational Remainder sold or scrapped
	1200		Brissonneau et Lotz Sorefame	1961-64	Regional Freight	Similar to SNCF Class BB 63000 1225 Preserved at FMNF Several sold to Argentina (9) and others (9) 1211, 1214 and 1216 stored and 2 scrapped
	1300		Whitcomb Locomotive Works	1952	Express Regional Freight	1311 Preserved at FMNF Remainder scrapped
	1320	ALCO DL535S	Alco		Freight	Acquired from Renfe in 1989 Sold back to Renfe and others
	1400		English Electric Sorefame	1967	Regional Freight Shunting	Based on British Rail Class 20 Some sold to Argentina Several scrapped Remainder stored or Operational
	1500	ALCO RSC-2	Alco	1948	Express Regional Freight	1501 Preserved at FMNF and 1505 stored Most scrapped and 3 sold
	1520	ALCO RSC-3	Alco		Express Regional Freight	1525 sold to Somafel Remainder scrapped
	1550	ALCO MX620	Montreal Locomotive Works	1973	Express Regional Freight	9 Stored, 3 Operational and 1561 scrapped Remainder sold Captrain Portugal (4) and Somafel (3)
	1800		English Electric	1968	Express Regional Freight	Similar to British Rail Class 50 1805 Preserved at FMNF Remainder scrapped (9)
	1900	Nez-Cassé	Sorefame/Alstom	1981	Freight	Similar to SNCF Class CC 72000 1901, 1908 and 1912 stored Remainder sold to Medway Portugal (8)
	1930	Nez-Cassé	Sorefame/Alstom	1979	InterCity Regional Freight	Similar to 1900-class but without Dynamic braking Some sold to Argentina (4) and Medway (3) Remainder stored (10)
	1960	ALCO MX627	Bombardier	1979	Regional Freight	Sold to Medway (4) or Stored (8) 1961 scrapped after Alcafache crash
	6000	Vossloh Euro 4000	Vossloh	2008–09	Freight	Captrain Portugal (7) Remaining registered in Spain as 335 Series
	9000		Alsthom	1958	Regional Freight Heritage	Meter gauge Acquired from Tajuña Railway (Spain) in 1974 9004 and 9005 Operational and 9006 stored Remainder sold to Benin (3)
	9020		Alsthom	1976	Regional Freight	Metre gauge All sold to MadaRail (7) and Guinea (4)

== Electric Multiple Units ==
Image	Class	Manufacturer	Year(s) made	Formation	Service	Notes
	2000	Sorefame	1956	DMSO - TSO - DTSO	Suburban Regional	Sold to Argentina (2) Remainder scrapped Driving Trailer 2013 at FMNF
	2050	Sorefame	1962	DMSO - TSO - DTSO	Suburban Regional	Development of 2000 Series Sold to Argentina (5) 2057 (FMNF), 2064 and 2073 Stored Remainder scrapped
	2080	Sorefame	1966	DMSO - TSO - DTSO	Suburban Regional	Development of 2050 Series Sold to Argentina (6) 2082 and 2086 Stored Remainder scrapped
	2100	Sorefame	1970	DTSO - MSO - DTSO	Regional	All rebuilt as 2240 Series
	2150	Sorefame	1977	DTSO - MSO - DTSO	Regional	Development of 2100 Series All rebuilt as 2240 Series
	2200	Sorefame	1984	DTSO - MSO - DTSO	Regional	Development of 2150 Series All rebuilt as 2240 Series
	2240	Alstom EMEF	2003/5	DTSO - MSO - DTSO	Suburban Regional InterCity	Modernized 2100, 2150 and 2200 Series 2 scrapped Remainder Operational
	2300	Sorefame Siemens	1992	DMSO - TSO - TSO - DMSO	Suburban	Built without air-conditioning (added after 2400 built) All units Operational (42)
	2400	Sorefame Siemens	1998	DMSO - TSO - TSO - DMSO	Suburban	Development of 2300 Series Built with air-conditioning All units Operational (14)
	2700	Stadler	2025	DMSO - PP - TSO - DMSO DMSO - TSO - DMSO	Regional	Delivered from December 2025 2701 to 2712 BMU and 2713 to 2722 EMU
	3100	Cravens RC&W Sorefame	1950 1959	DTSO - MSO - DTSO	Suburban	1500V DC (Cascais Line) All Cravens units scrapped (3101 - 3111) All Sorefame units rebuilt as 3150/3250 Series
	3150	Sorefame EMEF		DTSO - TSO - MSO - DTSO	Suburban	1500V DC (Cascais Line) Modernized 3100/3200 Series (Sorefame batches)
	3200	Sorefame	1960	DTSO - MSO - DTSO	Suburban	1500V DC (Cascais Line) Second batch of Sorefame units for Sociedade do Estoril All rebuilt as 3150/3250 Series
	3250	Sorefame EMEF		DTSO - TSO - MSO - DTSO	Suburban	1500V DC (Cascais Line) Modernized 3100/3200 Series (Sorefame batches)
	3400	Bombardier Siemens	2002	DTSO - MSO - MSO - DTSO	Suburban	Viriatus Model All units Operational (34)
	3500	CAF Alstom	1999/2000	DMSO - TSO - TSO - DMSO	Suburban	X'TRAPOLIS Tagus Model (similar to Renfe 450) All units Operational: CP (12) and Fertagus (18)
	4000	Fiat Ferroviaria	1999	DMFO - MFO - PTR - PTSO - MSO - DMSO	InterCity Express	Pendolino Model (similar to FS ETR 460) 1 unit severely damaged 9 Operational

== Diesel Multiple Units ==
Image	Class	Manufacturer	Year(s) made	Service	Notes
	0050	Nydqvist & Holm	1947/48	Regional	All scrapped
	0100	Nydqvist & Holm	1948	Regional	6 sold to Argentina 0111 Preserved at FMNF Remainder scrapped
	0300	Allan Rotterdam	1954/55	Regional	0301 Rebuilt as VIP Railcar 0304 Preserved at FMNF 0309 and 0311 scrapped Remainder rebuilt as 0350 Series
	0301 Allan VIP	Allan Rotterdam EMEF	1992	Catenary Inspection Vehicle	Former VIP Railcar Sold to Infraestruturas de Portugal
	0350	Allan Rotterdam EMEF	2000/04	Regional	Modenized 0300 Series Most scrapped or stored 6 units operacional
	0400	Sorefame	1965	Regional	All rebuilt as 0450 Series
	0450	Sorefame EMEF	1999	Regional	Modernised 0400 Series All units Operational (19)
	0500	Fiat Ferroviaria	1953	InterCity Regional	Most scrapped 0503 Stored at Contumil
	0592	MACOSA ATEINSA	1981/84	Regional	On loan from Renfe
	0600	Sorefame	1979	Regional	Built as 2-car units Center trailler added in 1989 0607 and 0612 stored Remainder scrapped
	0650	Sorefame	1989	Regional	Built as 3-car units 0651 + 0655 stored Remainder scrapped
	0750	Waggonfabrik Uerdingen CAF	1966	Regional	Uerdingen railbus Acquired from Renfe in 1979 All scrapped
	9100	Nydqvist & Holm	1950	Regional	Metre gauge (similar to 0100 Series) 9101 scrapped 9102 and 9103 stored
	9300	Allan Rotterdam	1954	Regional	Metre gauge (similar to 0300 Series) Most scrapped 9301 Preserved at Azpeitia (Spain) 9305 / 9306 / 9310 stored
	9400	Đuro Đaković EMEF	1992/93	Regional	Metre gauge Rebuilt from 9700 Series Sold to IncaRail (3) and Mozambique (3)
	9500	EMEF	1996	Regional	Metre gauge Rebuilt from 9700 Series 9505 + 9506 stored and 9502 scrapped Remainder sold to IncaRail
	9600	Alsthom	1976	Regional Suburban	Metre gauge Sold to Argentina (17) and Cameroon (5)
	9630	CAF Sorefame	1990	Regional Suburban	Metre gauge All Operational (7) at Vouga Line
	9700	Đuro Đaković	1963	Regional	Metre gauge Acquired from JŽ in 1980 (ex JŽ 802) 9701, 9710 and 9711 stored Remainder rebuilt as 9400 or 9500 Series
