= Narrow-gauge railways in Portugal =

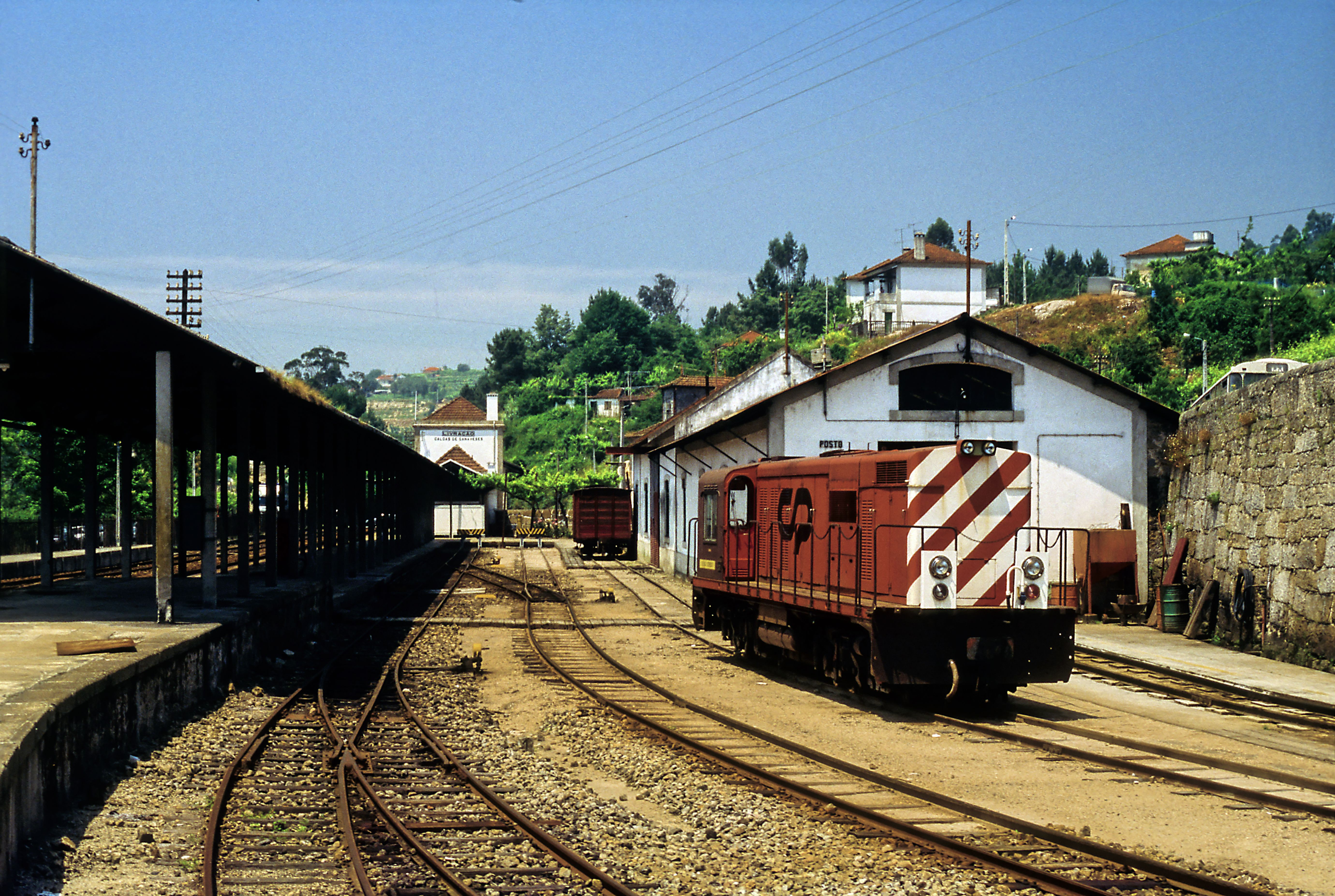
A Série 9020 diesel locomotive at Livração station on the Tâmega line

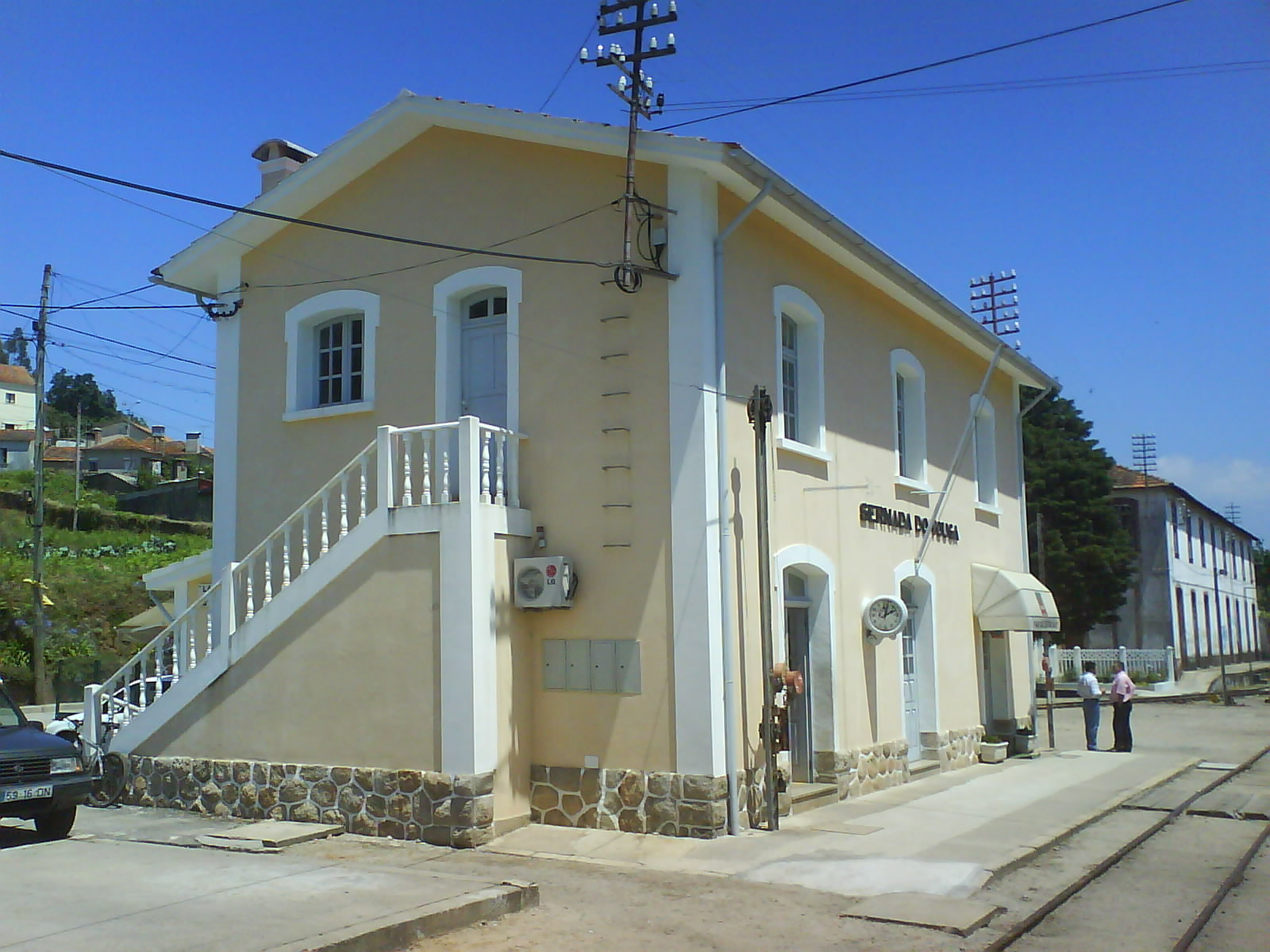
Sernada do Vouga railway station on the Vouga line

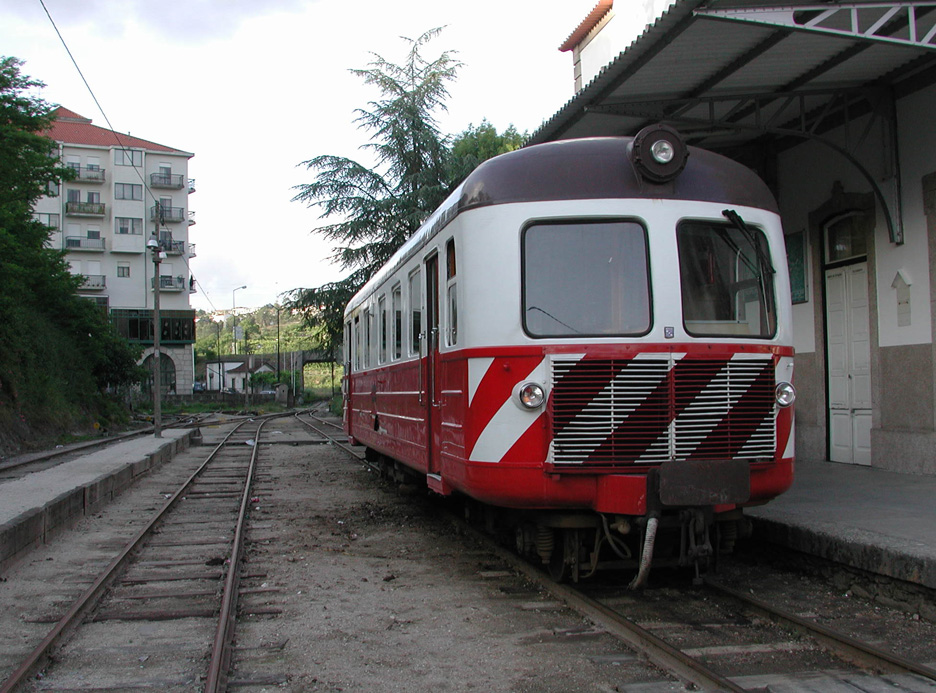
A Série 9100 diesel railcar at Amarante station on the Tâmega line in 2002

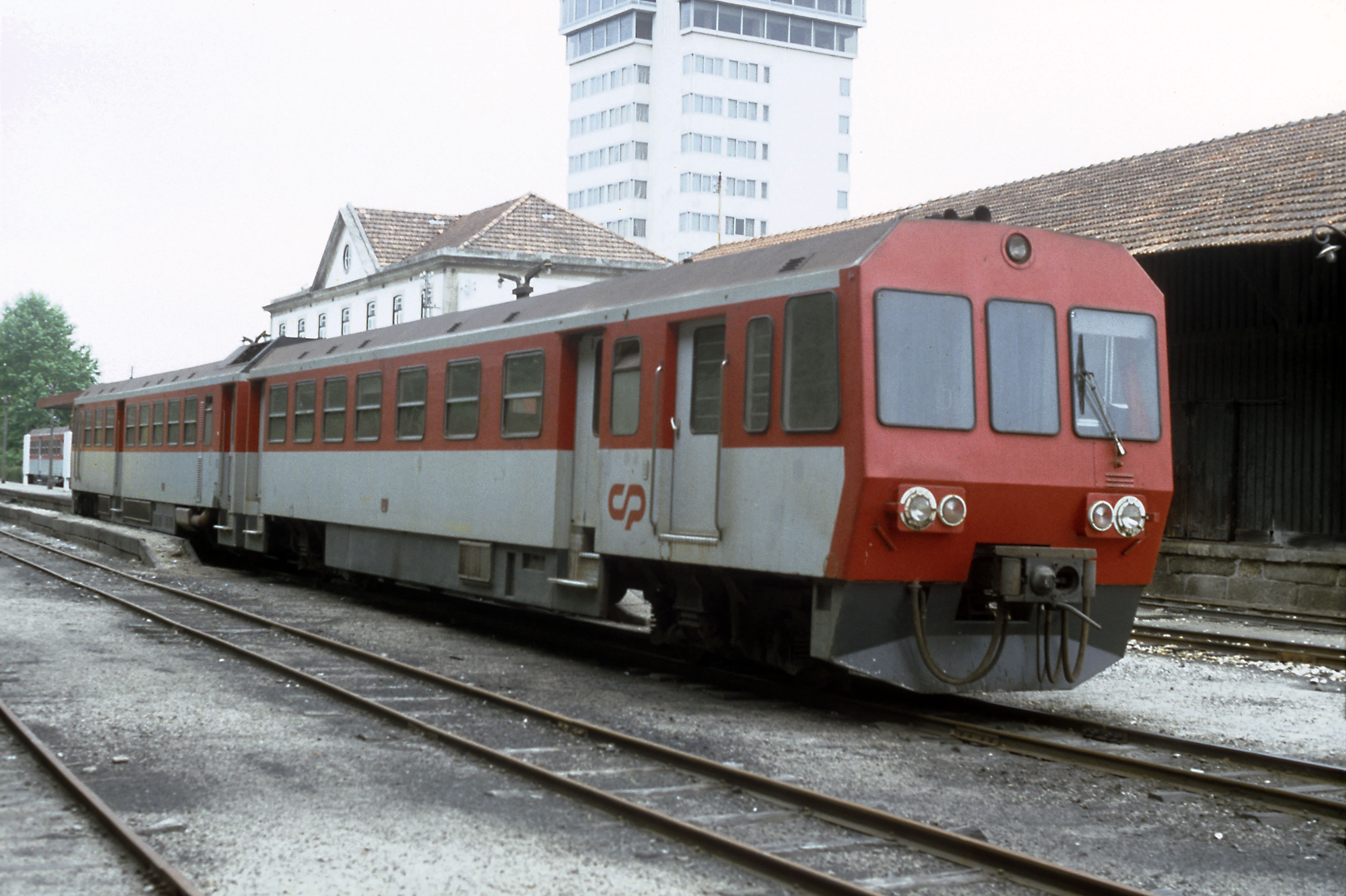
A Série 9600 narrow-gauge diesel multiple-unit train at Guimarães station in 1996. The line was electrified and rebuilt as a 1668 mm gauge railway between 2002 and 2004.

Portugal formerly had several hundred kilometres of narrow-gauge railways, but by 2010 only two lines were still in operation – the Vouga line and the Metro de Mirandela. The lines were operated by Comboios de Portugal and maintained by REFER (or the predecessor CP).

== History ==
The majority of railway lines in Portugal were built to 1,668 mm (5 ft 5 21/32 in) Iberian gauge. To reduce construction costs, some lines (notably in rural and mountainous parts of the country) were built to narrow gauge. Portugal's narrow gauge railways were largely built to metre gauge. The lines were mostly constructed from the 1880s onwards, with the final line not completed until as late as 1949. The first major wave of closures took place in the 1980s, notably the Sabor line and the Dão line. The northern extremities of the Corgo, Tâmega and Tua lines (all running north from the main Douro line through the Douro Valley) were closed in 1990/1, with the rest of these lines closing in 2008/9.

== Operational lines ==
- Vouga Line (Linha do Vouga) is the sole remaining narrow-gauge line still classified as part of the Portuguese National Rail Network. The Vouga Railway network originally had three sections, a main line, between Espinho and Sernada do Vouga, and two branch lines, one to Viseu and the other to Aveiro, starting at Sernada where the workshops are located. Since the mid-1970s, the network has been under constant threat of closure, especially due to the poor infrastructure condition. Closure would eventually come to the Viseu branch on 1 January 1990, with the remaining line continuing under constant threat of closure throughout the 1990s, 2000s and 2010s (the line was almost closed at the height of the European debt crisis). Passenger services in the core section between Sernada do Vouga and Oliveira de Azeméis ceased in the mid-2010s, due to low ridership numbers and poor infrastructure conditions which limit the maximum speed to only 10 km/h. As of 2021, the future of the line is less uncertain with the EU economic recovery package financing the infrastructure overhaul. Comboios de Portugal operates a regular passenger service on two routes: Aveiro to Sernada and Espinho to Oliveira de Azeméis, using a fleet of seven 2 car 9630 Series DMUs. CP also provides seasonal heritage services between Aveiro and Macinhata do Vouga (where a small railway museum occupies the former carriages shed) using either steam (only in winter due to wild fire risk) or diesel locomotives with 1900s or 1930s cars.
- Linha do Tua is closed, but the section between Mirandela and Brunheda is planned to be reopened. Until 1991, the line had extended to Bragança, but had then closed north of Mirandela. The Metro de Mirandela operated over a short part of the line until 2018; the rest of the line closed in 2008.

== Closed lines or converted to broad gauge ==
=== Closed in the 20th century ===
- Dão line: this line ran between Santa Comba Dão and Viseu. It was closed to freight in 1972 and passengers in 1988.
- Penafiel to Lixa and Entre-os-Rios line: this line, which met the Douro line at Penafiel, closed in the late 1920s after less than 20 years of service.
- Sabor line: this line ran from Pocinho to Duas Igrejas, passing through very rural areas in the north-east of the country. The line closed in 1988.

=== Closed in the 21st century ===
- Tâmega line: this line ran between Livração and Amarante in the District of Porto, near the Tâmega River. In 1949 the line was extended as far north as Arco de Baúlhe; it was projected that the line would continue along the Tâmega river valley until the Chaves and Corgo line, but this extension was never built. The section between Amarante and Arco de Baúlhe closed in 1990. The remaining part of the line closed in 2009.
- Corgo line: this line ran from Regua, on the Douro River to Vila Real. The line previously ran further north to Chaves (until 1990). The line closed in 2009. There is a small Railway Museum at Chaves.

=== Converted to broad gauge ===
- Guimarães line: this line (Porto-Guimarães-Fafe) was built as a metre-gauge line. It closed between Guimarães and Fafe in 1986; the trackbed was converted into a cycle way. The rest of the Guimarães line (west of Guimarães to Porto) was converted to broad 1,668 mm (5 ft 5 21/32 in) Iberian gauge in 2004.

=== Converted to standard gauge (metro) ===
- Porto to Póvoa and Famalicão line: this formed the basis of the narrow-gauge section of Porto's suburban railway system, starting from Trindade station in Porto along with the Guimarães line. The narrow-gauge lines are no longer in operation, but part of the trackbed of this system has been rebuilt for use by the Porto Metro.

== Rolling stock ==
The narrow-gauge lines were steam-operated, predominantly by Mallet locomotives, for much of their existence. Diesel railcars were introduced as an economy measure in the 1940s, notably the Série 9100 built in Sweden for the Tâmega line in 1949 and the Dutch-built Série 9300 railcars used on several other lines from the early 1950s onwards. The Série 9700 diesel multiple units were purchased secondhand from the Yugoslav Railways in 1980, but frequently proved unreliable.

Metre-gauge diesel locomotives were built to replace steam haulage, especially on freight or mixed trains, notably the Série 9020 built in 1976. Steam remained in use on some lines until the 1980s.

== Trams ==
The tram system in Lisbon, operated by Carris, is also narrow gauge – with 900 mm (2 ft 11 7/16 in) track gauge.

== See also ==
- FEVE (narrow-gauge railways in Spain)
- History of rail transport in Portugal
- List of Portuguese locomotives and railcars
- Rail transport in Portugal
