= 2500 class =

2500 class or Class 2500 may refer to:

- CP Class 2500, electric locomotives
- Illinois Central 2500 Class, 4-8-2 steam locomotives
- PNR 2500 class, diesel-electric locomotives
- South Australian Railways Redhen railcar#2300/2500 class ("Superchook") variant
