= CP Class 0100 =

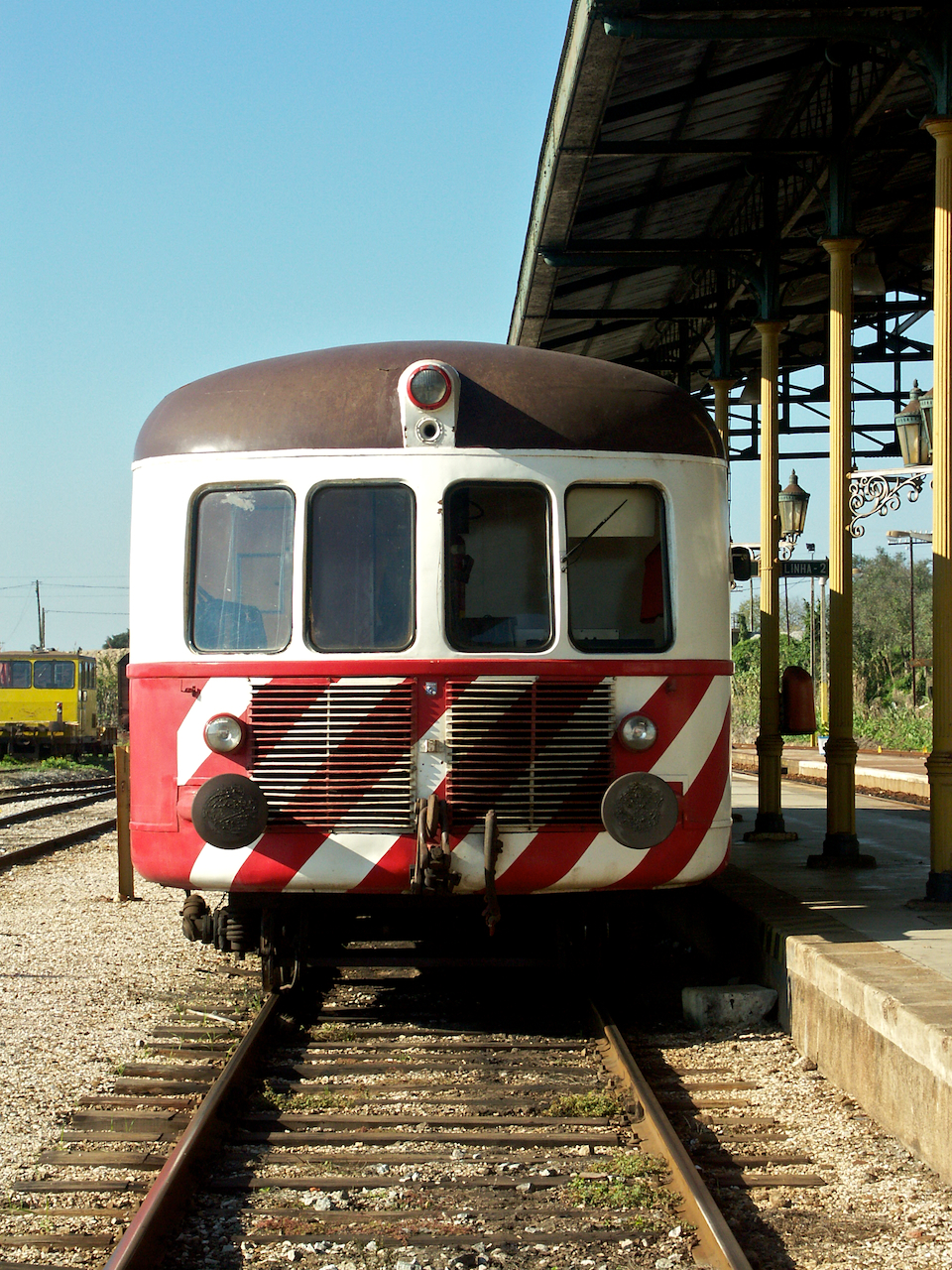
- 0113 at Casa Branca station

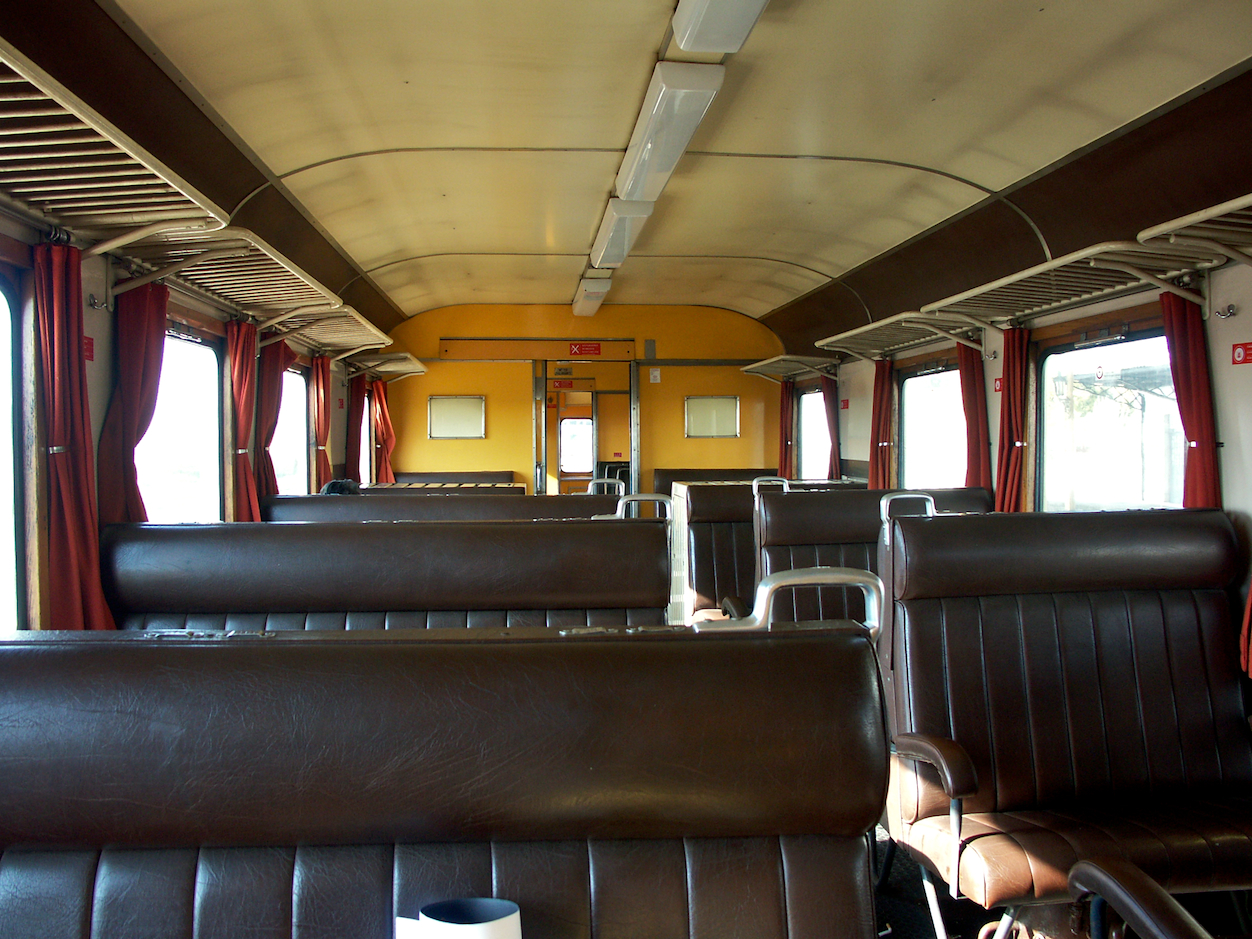
- Interior
- In service: 1948–2005
- Manufacturer: NOHAB
- Constructed: 1948
- Number built: 15
- Formation: 1 car per trainset, 1 trailer (optional)
- Capacity: 1st class: 24 seats 2nd class: 70 seats
- Operators: Comboios de Portugal

Specifications
- Car body construction: Steel
- Maximum speed: 100 km/h (62 mph)
- Weight: 34.23 t (33.69 long tons; 37.73 short tons)
- Traction system: Diesel-hydraulic
- Prime mover(s): Two per car, Saab-Scania D11 - 01 A 11
- Power output: 182 hp (136 kW)
- Transmission: Two Voith DIWA 506-380/VTS
- Braking system(s): Air
- Track gauge: 1,668 mm (5 ft 5 21/32 in) Iberian gauge (Portugal), 1,676 mm (5 ft 6 in) (Argentina)

The Série 0100 are a type of single carriage diesel railcar built for Portuguese Railways (CP). They were built by NOHAB of Trollhättan in Sweden in 1948. They were extensively refurbished in 1980. As of 2012 only six units are still in Portugal; the other six were sold to Argentina and the rest were destroyed by fire or accidents. As of 2013 none are in service in Portugal.

Three similar, but smaller, Série 9100 railcars were also supplied by NOHAB in 1949 for use on the metre gauge Tâmega line in northern Portugal.
