= CP Class 0450 =

Série 0450
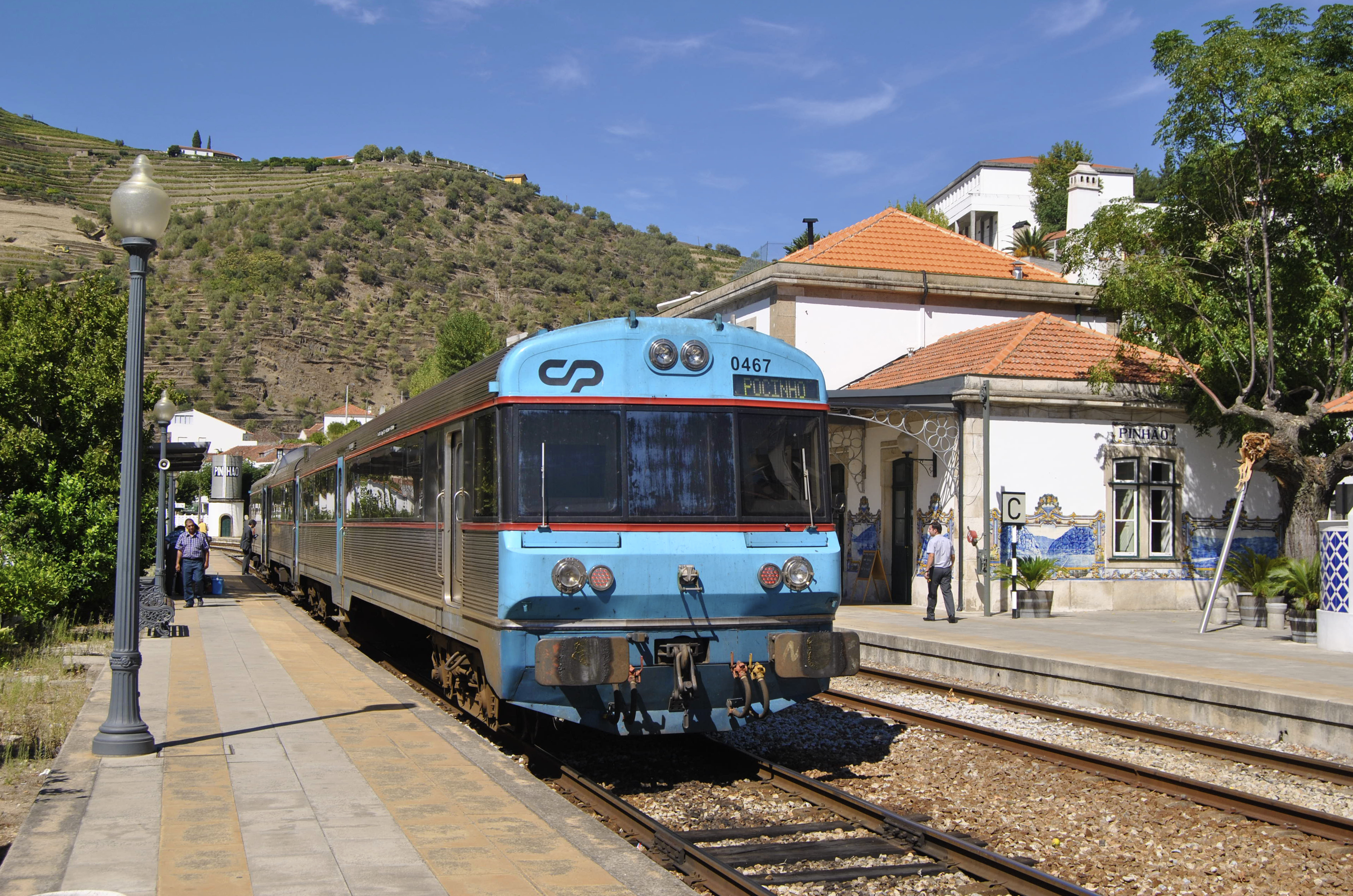
- Série 0450 train (number 0467) at Pinhão station, 2009

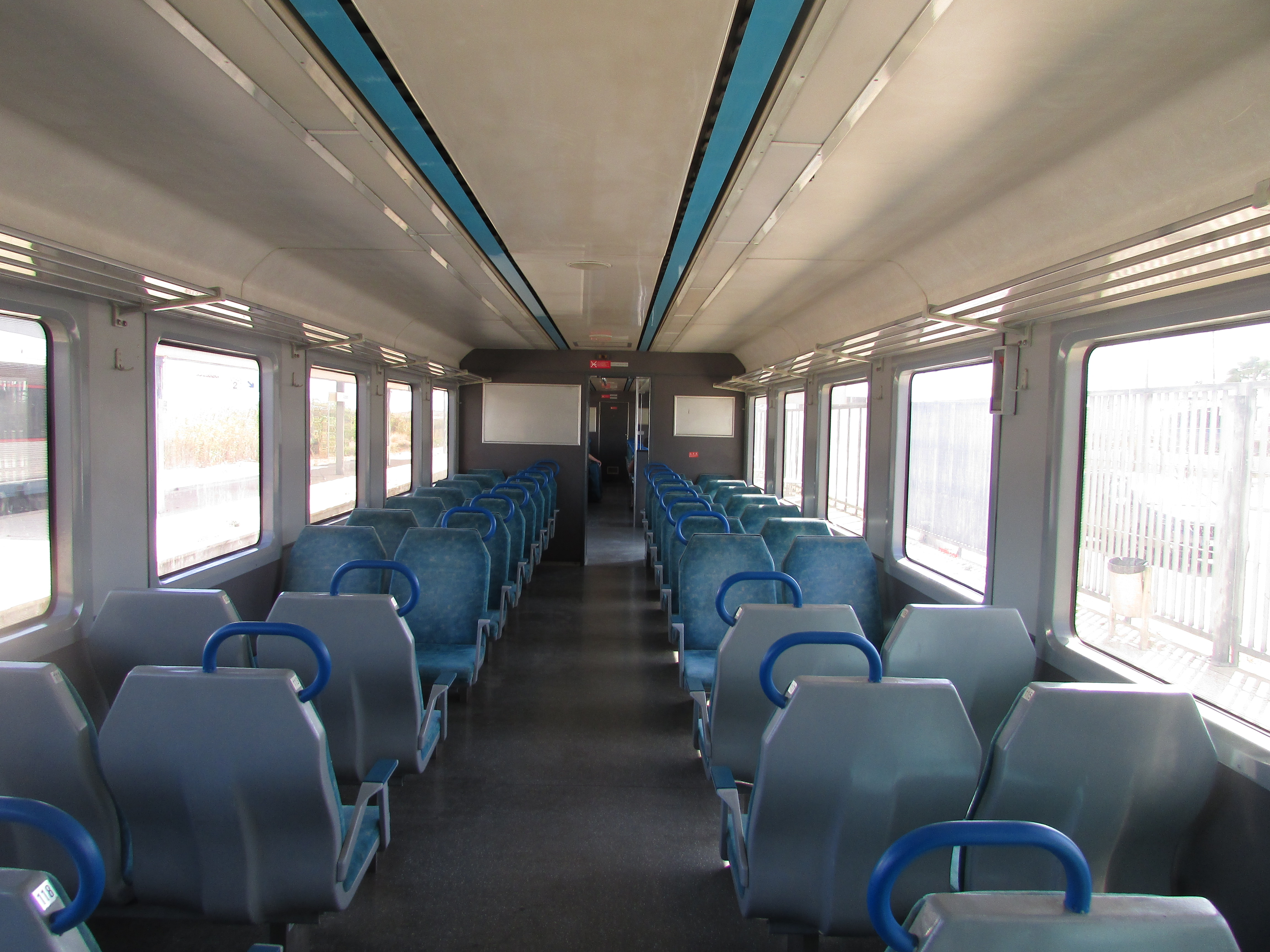
- Interior
- In service: 1965 - present
- Manufacturer: Sorefame
- Constructed: 1965-66
- Entered service: 1965
- Refurbished: 1999
- Number built: 19
- Fleet numbers: 0451–0469
- Capacity: 388
- Operator: Comboios de Portugal
- Depots: Guifões, Faro, Lisboa - Santa Apolónia

Specifications
- Train length: 51.96 metres (170.5 ft)
- Width: 2.97 metres (9.7 ft)
- Height: 4.39 metres (14.4 ft)
- Floor height: 1.33 metres (4.4 ft)
- Doors: Electric doors, 3 on each side
- Wheel diameter: 850 millimetres (2.79 ft)
- Maximum speed: 120 kilometres per hour (75 mph)
- Prime mover: 2 × Cummins
- Engine type: NTA 855 - R3
- Cylinder count: 6
- Power output: 405 CV
- Transmission: Hydro-mechanical
- HVAC: Air conditioning
- Braking system: Electro-pneumatic
- Track gauge: 1,668 mm (5 ft 5 21/32 in)

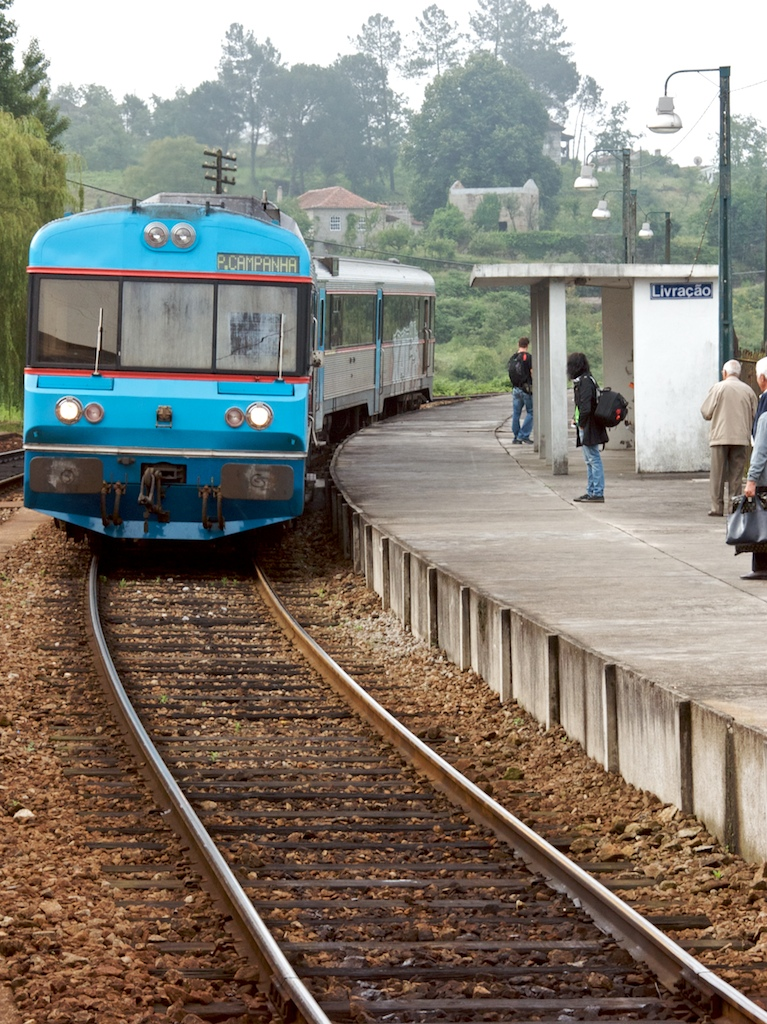
A CP Série 0450 at Livração station in the Douro Valley, formerly the junction for the Tâmega line

The Série 0450 is a type of diesel multiple unit train used by the Portuguese Railways (CP). They were originally built in 1965-66 as the Série 0400. Following extensive modernisation and refurbishment in 1999 they were redesignated Série 0450; 19 units are in service.

They are used on numerous services, including the international service between Porto and Vigo.
