= NOHAB =

Swedish manufacturing company (1916–1979)

- Industry: Engineering
- Predecessor: Trollhättans Mekaniska Verkstad (1847)
- Founded: 1916
- Defunct: 1979
- Fate: Sold to Electro Motive Division
- Successor: Electro Motive Division
- Headquarters: Trollhättan, Sweden
- Products: Locomotives, aircraft, turbines

NOHAB (Nydqvist & Holm AB) was a manufacturing company based in the city of Trollhättan, Sweden.

== History ==
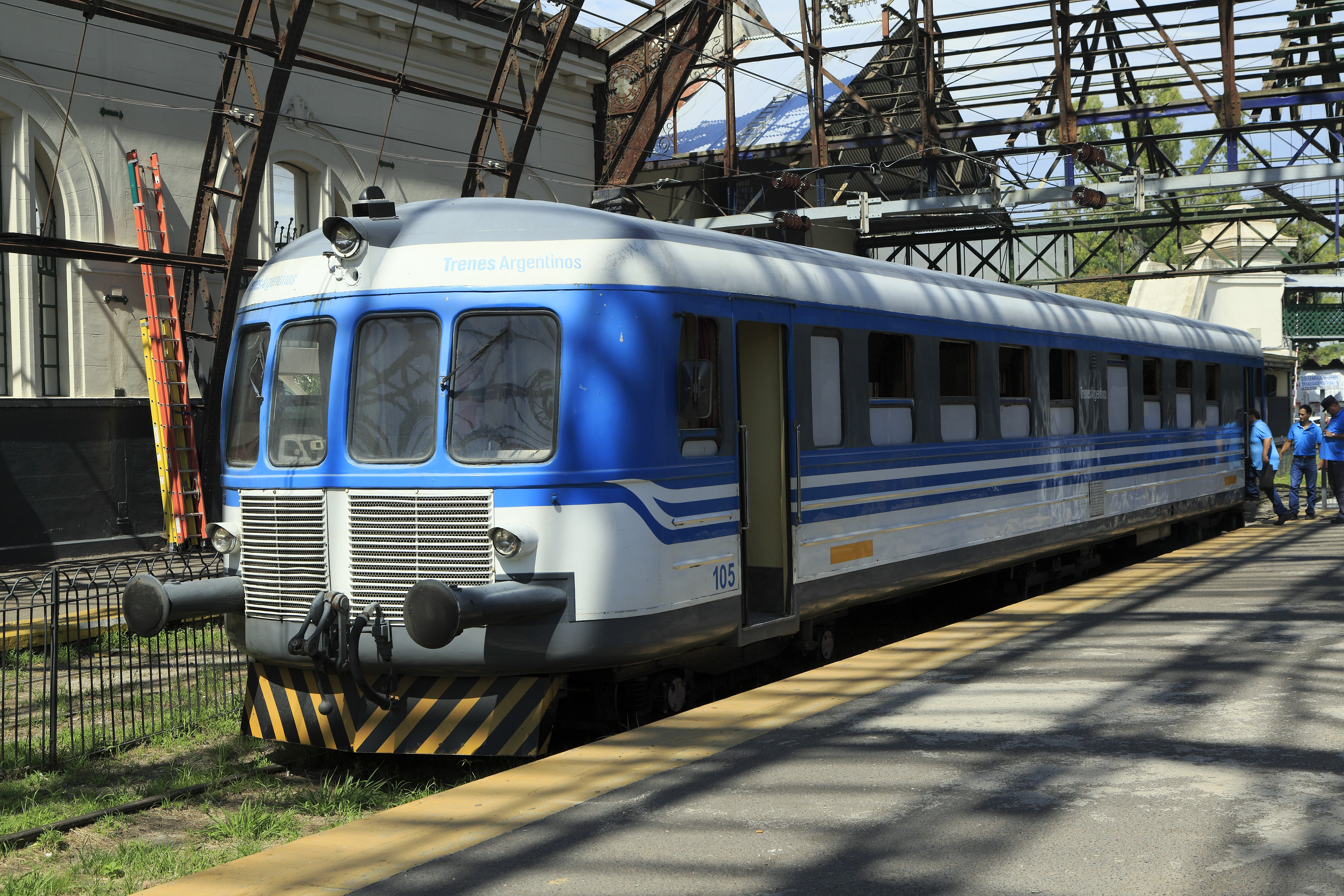
NOHAB broad gauge railcar operated by Ferrocarriles Argentinos on the University train of La Plata.

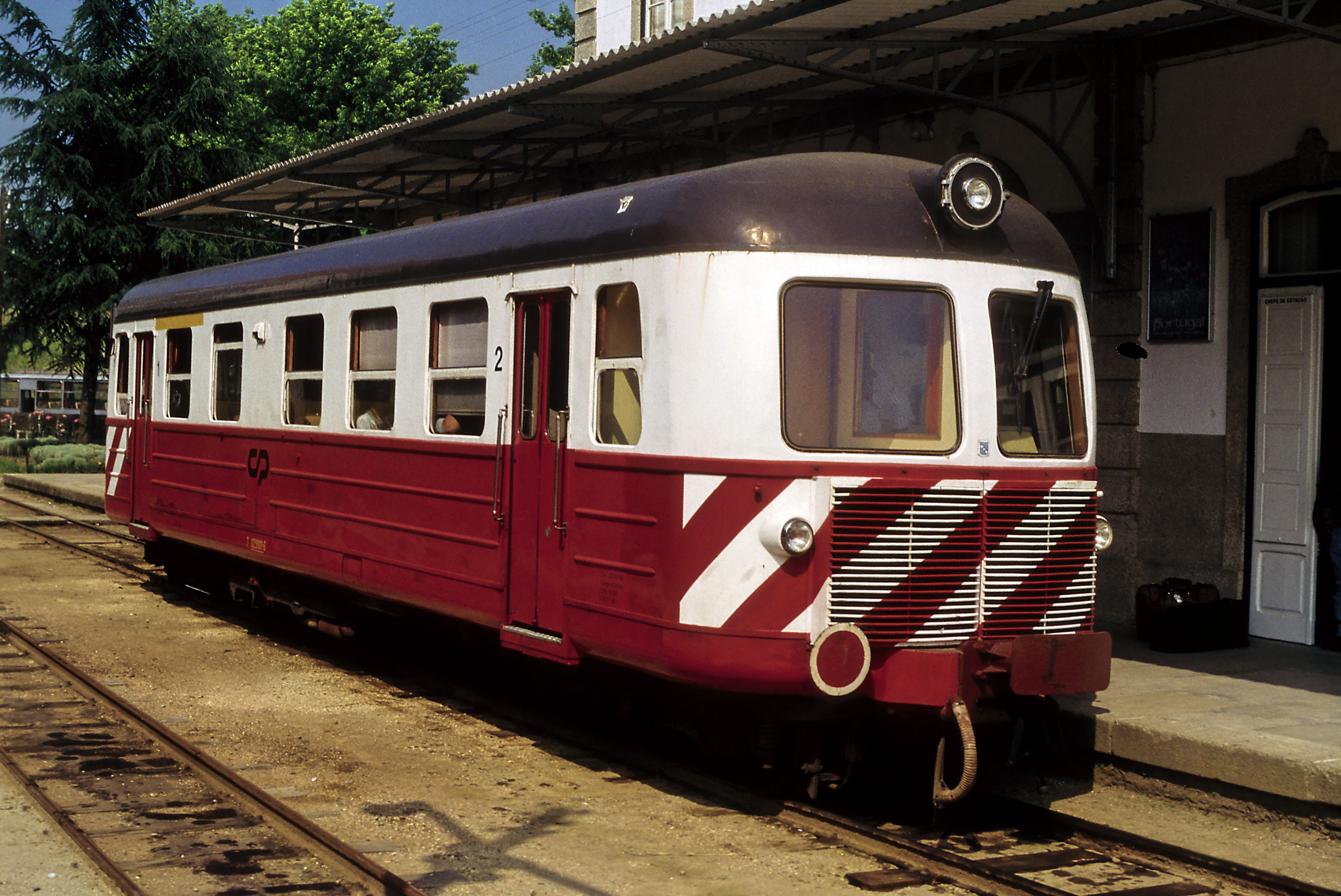
A NOHAB-built metre gauge Série 9100 diesel railcar of the Portuguese Railways at Amarante station on the Tâmega line, northern Portugal (1996)

The company was founded by Antenor Nydqvist, Johan Magnus Lidström and Carl Olof Holm in 1847 as Trollhättans Mekaniska Verkstad (Trollhättan's Mechanical Workshop) as a manufacturer of turbines for hydraulic power plants. In 1865, the company made its first steam locomotive and in 1912 the 1,000th locomotive steamed out of the factory. In Nohab's anniversary book "The Thousand Locomotive" from 1912, it's mentioned that the company also manufactured davits for Titanic's lifeboats.

In 1916 the company was reconstituted as a limited company and became NOHAB. In 1920, NOHAB received an order of 1000 locomotives from Soviet Russia. Only 500 were delivered between 1921 and 1924.

In 1924, Nohab built three steam locomotives, 4-6-0 ones for 1,000 mm (3 ft 3 3/8 in) metre gauge with the respective builder's plates #1727, #1728 and #1729 for Estrada de Ferro Rio d'Ouro in the state of Rio de Janeiro (Brazil). According to E.F. Rio d'Ouro's surviving records, they would not have arrived in Brazil before 1926.

In 1930, NOHAB started manufacturing the Bristol Jupiter aircraft engine, under licence from the Bristol Aeroplane Company. A couple of years later the aircraft engine division of NOHAB and AB Svenska järnvägsverkstäderna (Swedish Railway Workshop Limited), in Linköping, formed the aircraft manufacturer SAAB.

1930-1936 they built the Ljungström steam turbine locomotives.

In 1948 NOHAB supplied diesel railcars to the Portuguese Railways (CP), in both 1,668 mm (5 ft 5 21/32 in) Iberian gauge (the Série 0100) and 1,000 mm (3 ft 3 3/8 in) metre gauge versions (the Série 9100).

In the 1950s, NOHAB started manufacturing diesel locomotives under licence from Electro-Motive Division of General Motors.

The Danish State Railways were a major customer. 35 Di 3 were also delivered to the Norwegian State Railways.

In addition to locomotives and aircraft NOHAB was a major manufacturer of turbines for power plants and well known for medium size ship engines. NOHAB also manufactured the hulls for the S-tank.

In the 1970s, the diesel engine manufacturing facility was sold to Wärtsilä and became known as Wärtsilä Nohab.

The company went bankrupt in 1979.

=== NOHAB in Hungary ===
In the early 1960s twenty NOHAB diesel engines were built for Hungarian State Railways (MÁV), but due to the Iron Curtain, further imports were stopped in favour of M62 locomotives made in Soviet Union. The Swedish locomotives were classified by MÁV as type M61 and proved versatile, highly reliable as well as economical to run. They were even used to haul non-stoppable radioactive waste transport trains from the Paks Nuclear Power Plant to Soviet reprocessing facilities, despite the availability of Soviet-made M62 engines.

The M61 type has achieved a cult status in Hungary because they were used to haul most express trains to holiday resorts around the Lake Balaton region, especially on railway no. 29. Their images became closely associated with teenage summer camps, exploration and family recreation during the socialist era, when foreign travel was highly restricted for the average citizen. During this time, the locomotives were based at the Tapolca depot, which led to their association with the town. In recognition of this, locomotive 004 received the name "Tapolca".

Scrapping of the locomotives started in 1989, and the class was withdrawn from regular passenger service in December 2000. Locomotives 003, 005, 007, 008, 009, 011, 012, 013, 014, 015, 016 and 018 were scrapped, most had only minor mechanical problems, some were cut up in operational status.

Nowadays, we can find 9 operational and 3 inoperable examples in Hungary. They are:

- M61 001, 006, 019, 020: All operational, owned by MÁV Rail Tours Kft. (formerly MÁV Nosztalgia Kft.). Locomotives 001, 006 and 020 are painted in the 1963 paint scheme, 019 is painted in the later orange-grey paint scheme. They forward special trains, and can also be found on work trains and freight trains around the country.
- M61 010 » 618 010: Operational, currently undergoing overhauls as of July 2025. Owned by the Nohab-GM Foundation, it operates under the aegis of Komplex Rail. Forwards special trains, alongside work and freight trains. Painted in a unique maroon livery, similar to the original 1963 one.
- M61 017 » A61 017 » 2761 017 » M61 017: Operational, property of the MÁV Track and Engineering Facilities Directorate. Locomotive equipped with a central energy supply generator (1500 V~) and modified traction gear, capable of speeds of 120 km/h. It transports gauge trains and other maintenance-of-way trains. Painted in a modified 1963 scheme with a dark blue stripe on its sides.
- M61 002: Inoperable since 1998, stripped of parts and partially scrapped in 2001. Owned by the Nohab-GM Foundation, renovation planned in the future. Stored for many years at Budapest-Keleti station, it has been moved to the former Tapolca depot for storage in October 2023.
- M61 004: Inoperable. Named after the town of Tapolca. Selected for museum preservation after planned withdrawal. In 1993, it was painted back to its original 1963 paint scheme. On June 4, 1999, it was damaged beyond repair in an accident at Badacsonylábdihegy. Partially scrapped, its "B" cab has been preserved, and was on display at the front of the Hungarian Transport Museum until 2015, when it was moved to Tapolca railway station.
- 459 021: Former DSB MY 1125. Operational. Built in 1957, owned by Kárpát Vasút ("Carpathian Railways") since 2012. Forwards freight trains and work trains. Nicknamed "Ketty". Recognizable by its Santa Fe Warbonnet livery.
- 459 022: Former DSB MY 1156. Operational. Built in 1965, owned by Kárpát Vasút ("Carpathian Railways") since 2015. Forwards freight trains and work trains. Nicknamed "Gunhild". It had several paint schemes over the years, it is currently painted similar to the MÁV 1963 livery.
- M61 000: Former NSB Di3.623. Inoperable, undergoing restoration. Owned by the Nohab-GM Foundation. Nohab demonstrative locomotive in Eastern Europe (1960).
- 618.629: Former NSB Di3.629. Built in 1965, owned by Komplex Rail since 2020. Forwards freight trains. Recognizable by its dark green livery.

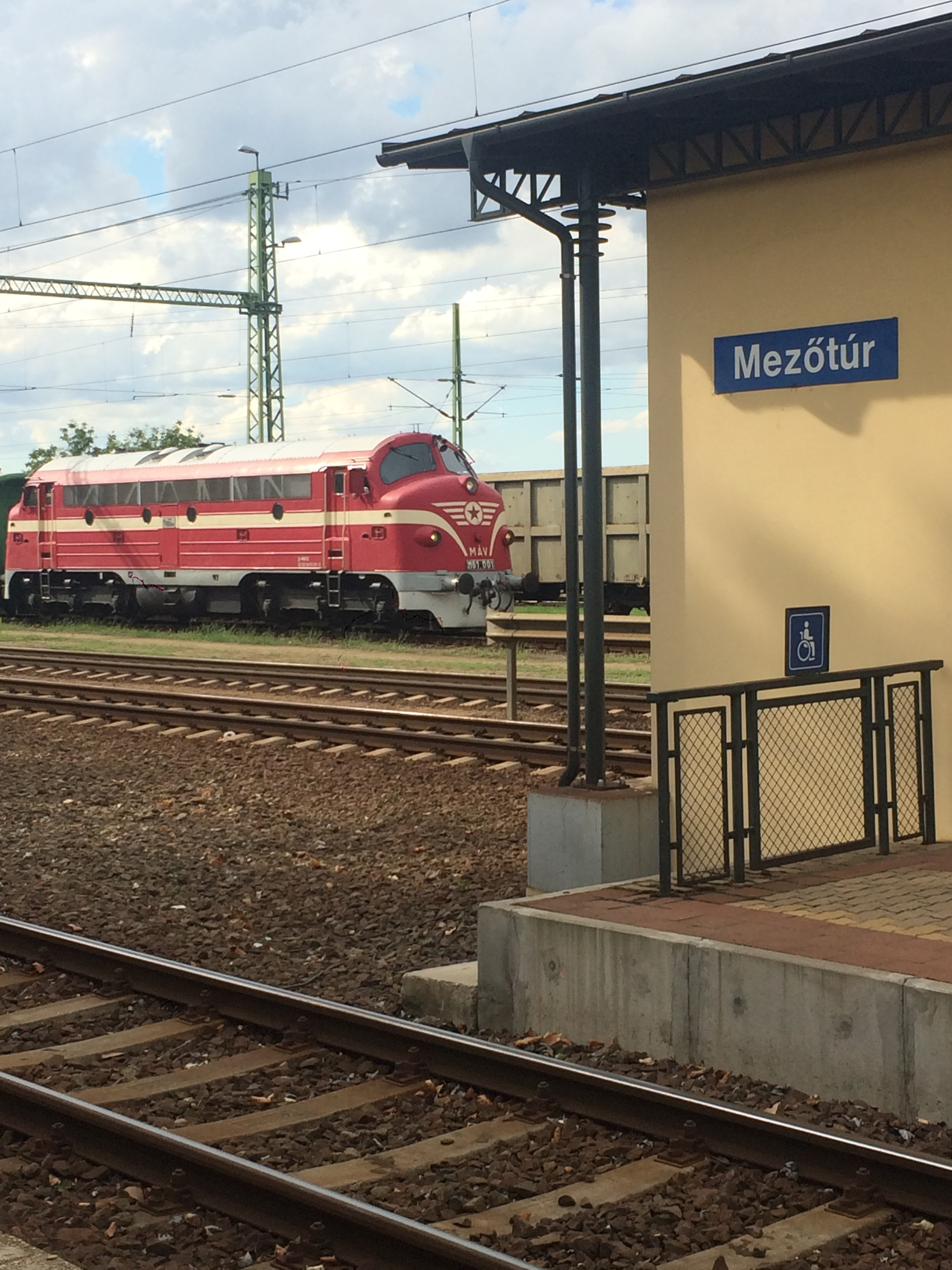
NOHAB near Mezőtúr carrying track laying material (2017)

Locomotive production
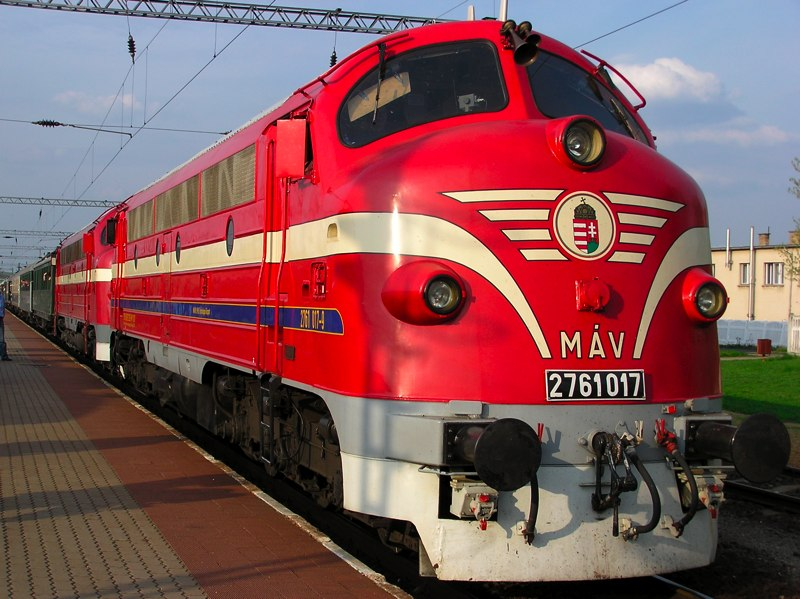
Hungarian NOHAB M61 (MÁV M61 017)

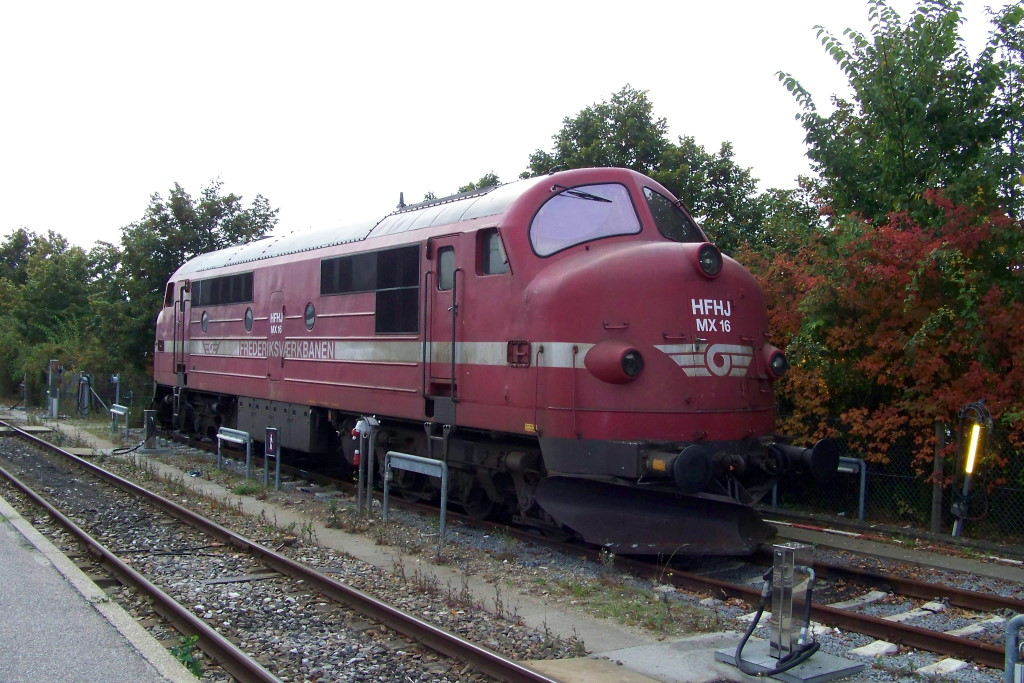
NOHAB Ex-DSB class MX owned now by HFHJ

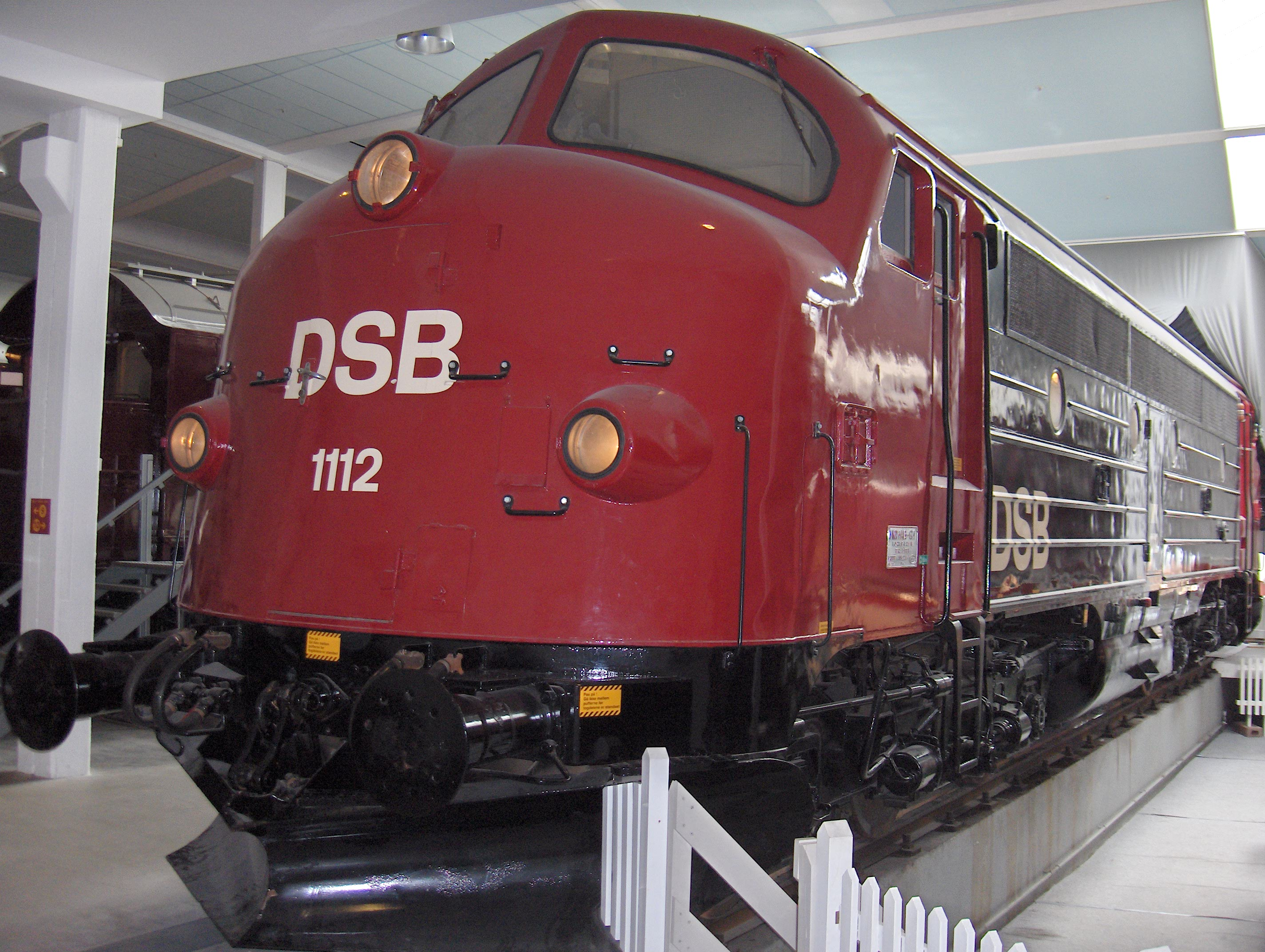
NOHAB DSB class MY

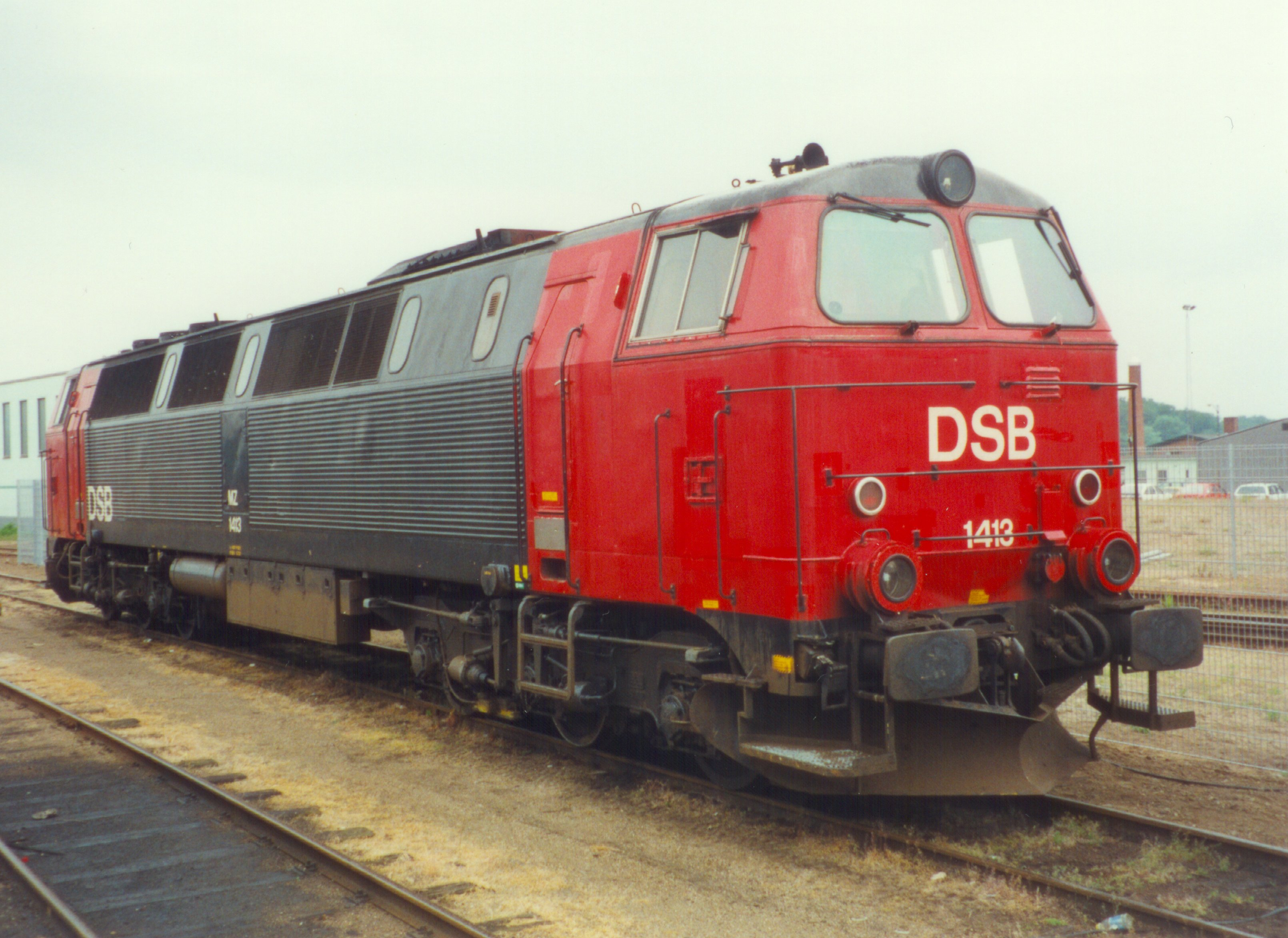
NOHAB DSB class MZ
