= CP Class 9100 =

Portuguese railcar

CP Class 0100
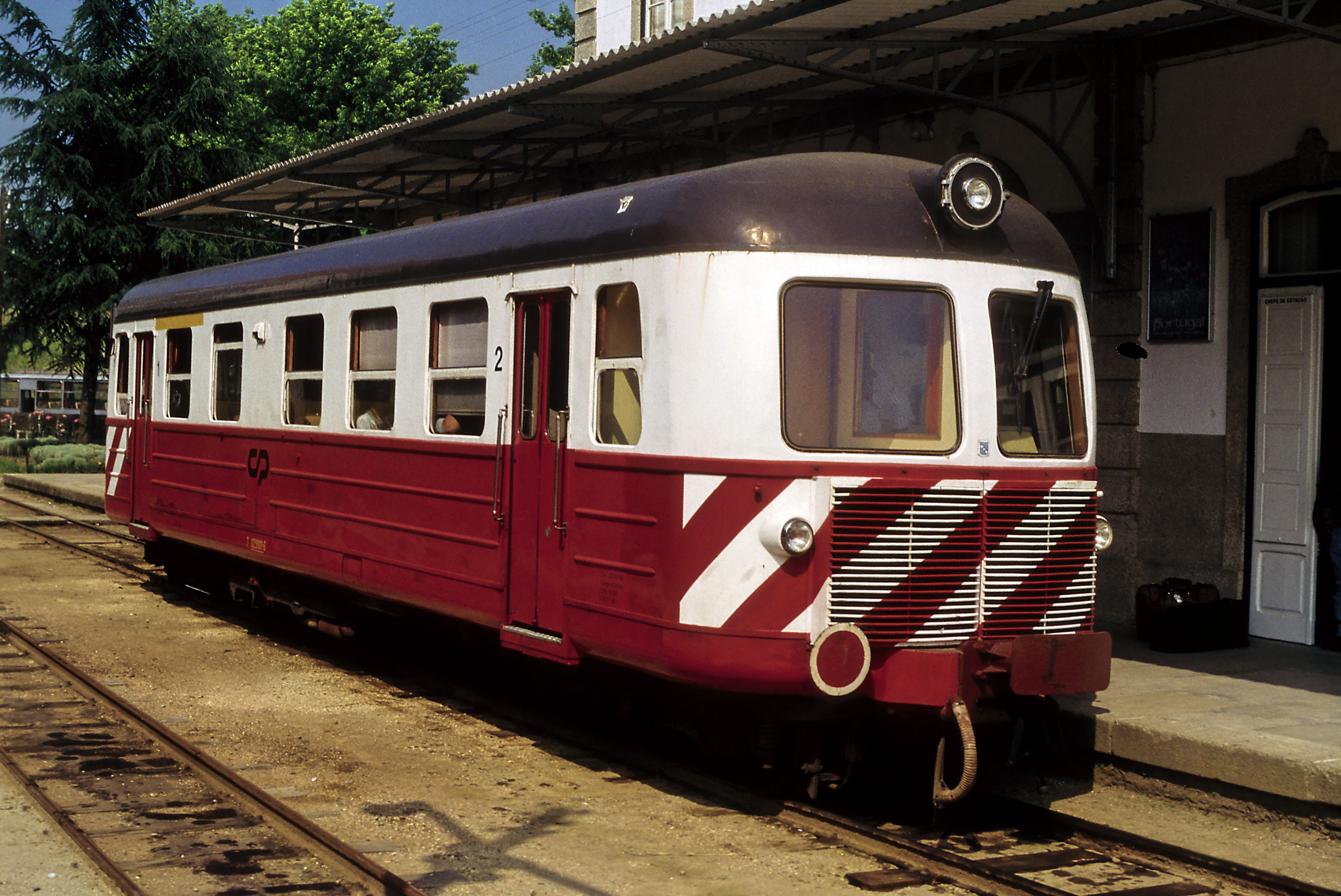
- A CP railcar of Série 9100 at Amarante station on the Tâmega line, May 1996
- In service: 1949-2002
- Manufacturer: NOHAB
- Constructed: 1949
- Number built: 3
- Capacity: 1st class: 8 seats 2nd class: 28 seats standing: 20 places
- Operators: Comboios de Portugal
- Lines served: Tâmega line

Specifications
- Car body construction: Steel
- Wheel diameter: 700 mm (27.6 in)
- Maximum speed: 70 km/h (43 mph)
- Weight: 26,125 kg (57,595.8 lb)
- Traction system: Diesel-hydraulic
- Prime mover(s): 2 × Scania-Vabis D-802 4 stroke 8-cylinder diesel
- Power output: 2 × 150 hp (110 kW)
- Tractive effort: 3,680 kgf (8,113.0 lbf)
- Transmission: 2 × A.B Atlas Diesel D F B-10-Lysholm-Smit
- UIC classification: B' B'
- Braking system(s): Knorr compressed-air
- Safety system(s): Dead man's switch
- Track gauge: 1,000 mm (3 ft 3 3/8 in) metre gauge

Notes/references
- primary reference

The Série 9100 were a class of metre gauge diesel railcars built for use by the Portuguese Railways (CP) on the Tâmega line.

Three 9100 series railcars were built in 1949 by Swedish manufacturer NOHAB of Trollhättan. They were essentially a narrow gauge version of CP's larger Iberian broad gauge Série 0100 diesel railcars. They were in revenue service until 2002, when they were withdrawn and replaced by the new CP Série 9500 railcars.

== Gallery ==
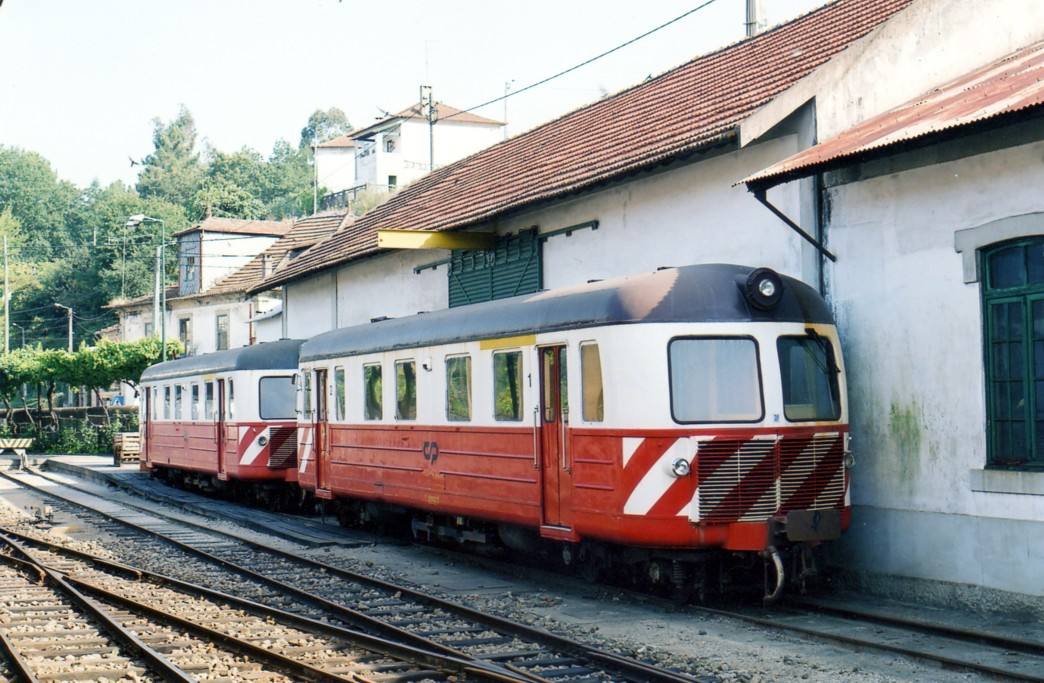
two CP 9100 railcars in Livração in 2003

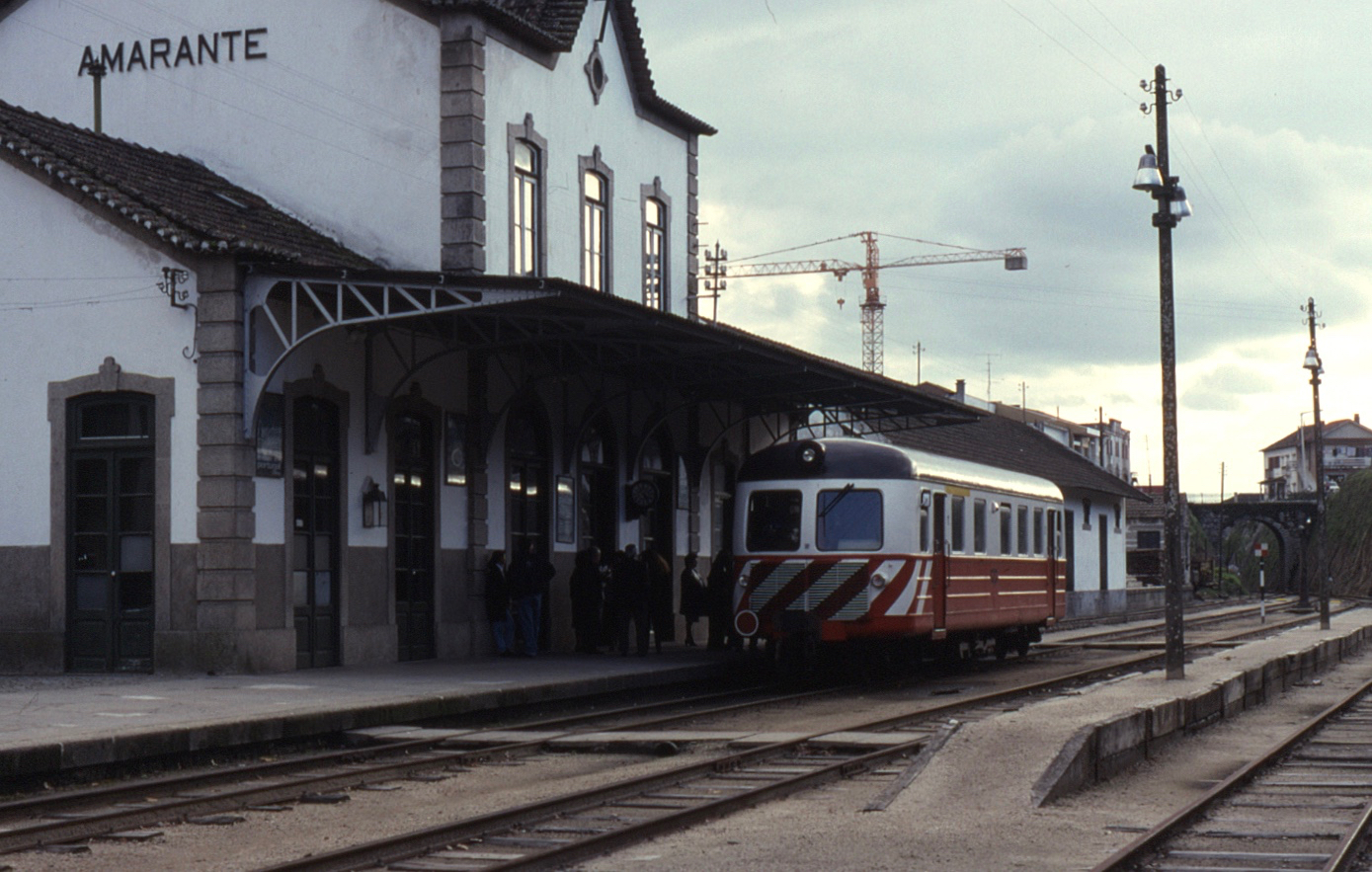
CP 1901 at Amarante on 7 November 1993

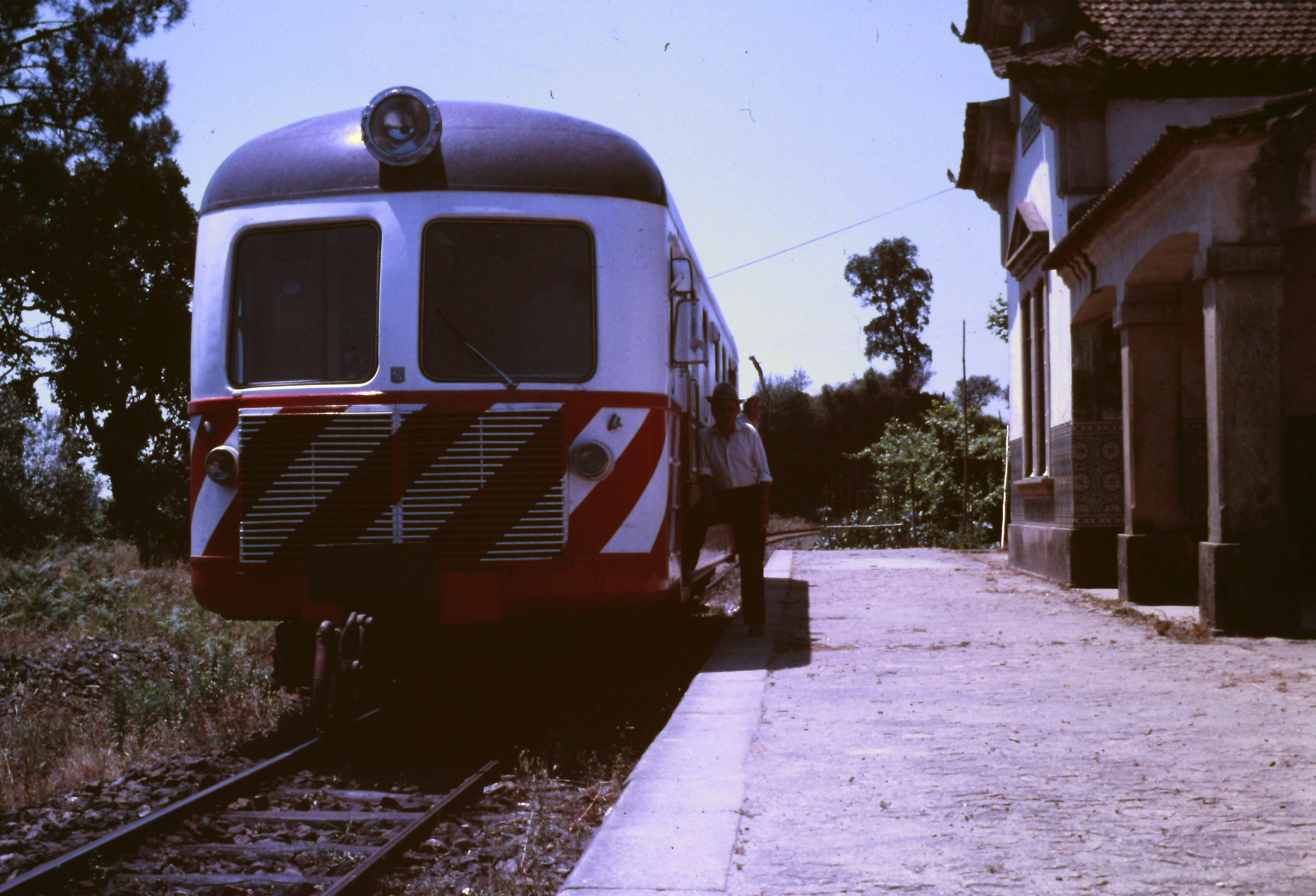

== See also ==
=== Related articles ===
- Narrow gauge railways in Portugal

=== External links ===
- Website with extra technical data
