= CP Class 0400 =

Portuguese train

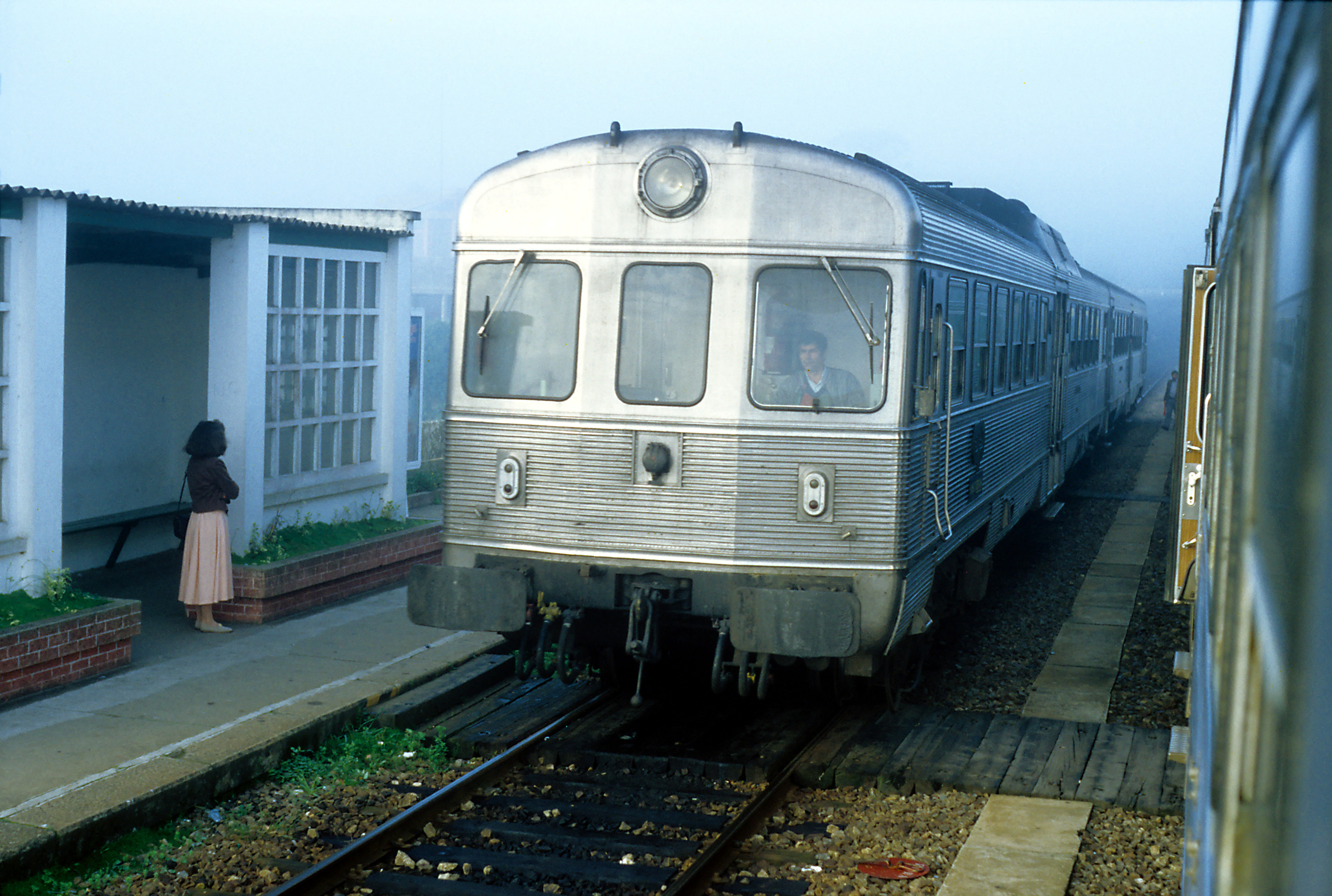
CP Class 0400 railcar travelling on the Minho line in 1998.

The CP Class 0400, commonly called by the nickname Rolls Royce, refers to a type of railcar that was used by the Portuguese Railway Company and its successor, between 1965 and 2001.

== History ==
They entered service with the operator Portuguese Railway Company in 1965, having been built on the premises of the company Sorefame.

In 1994, the remodelling of the railcars in this series was already being planned in the Porto workshops of the Rail Equipment Maintenance Company, with various changes to the interiors and the replacement of the original engines with more recent ones manufactured by Volvo; it was also planned to build a prototype for the operator Portuguese Railway Company. They were refurbished there between 1994 and 1995 and underwent several changes; inside, the wooden dividers were made of glass and new curtains, seats and side panels were introduced, in different colours to the previous ones. One of the toilets was also removed in order to provide more seating, and the light sources were changed to produce more illumination. In the driving cabs, the colour scheme was also changed, and the seat for the co-driver was removed and a more ergonomic seat for the driver was added.

All the units in this series after being remodelled were integrated into the CP Class 0450 series, becoming extinct in 2001.
