= CP Classes 0600 and 0650 =

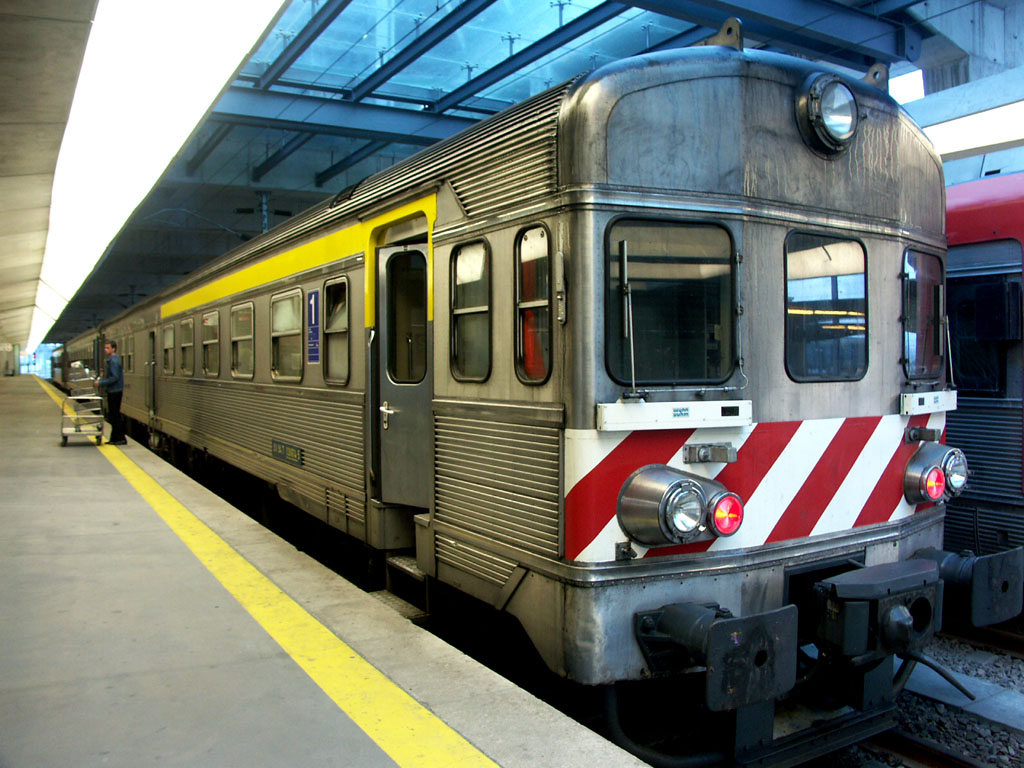
Série 0600 diesel multiple unit 0614 at Campanhã station in Porto.

The Série 0600/0650 are a type of train formerly used in Portugal. Introduced in two batches in 1979 (Série 0600) and 1989 (Série 0650), they were a class of three-carriage diesel multiple units with diesel-hydraulic transmission used by Comboios de Portugal (CP). They were built in Portugal by Sorefame, using Sorefame's usual stainless steel bodywork. They had both first and second class seating. The last examples were withdrawn from service in 2012.

Triple Car Unit 0655, 0625 and 0661 are preserved at The National Railway Museum in Entroncamento.
