= CP Class 2550 =

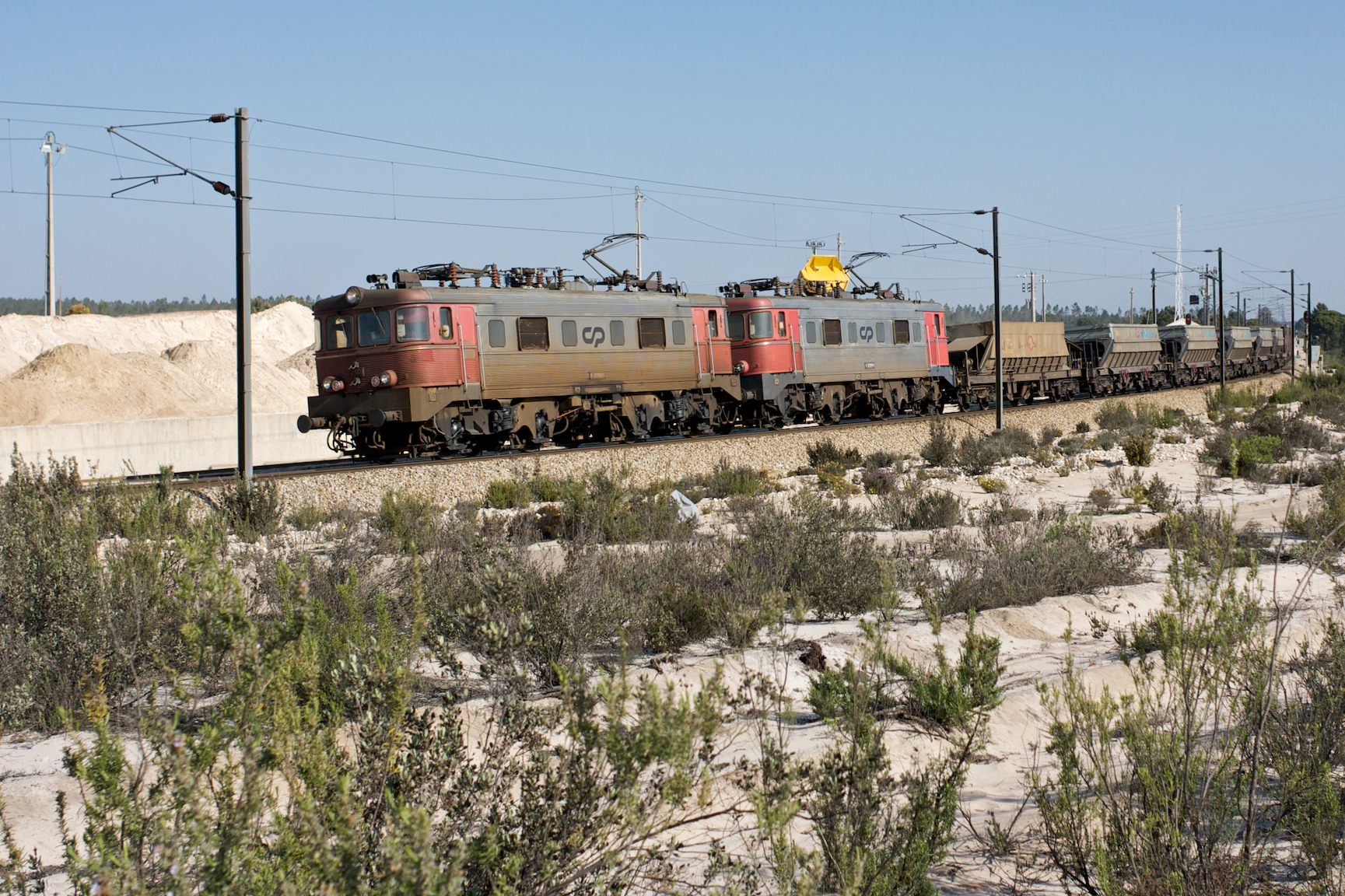
- Two Série 2550 locomotives hauling a freight train
Type and origin
- Power type: Electric
- Builder: Groupement d'Étude d'Électrification Monophasé 50 Hz; Henschel; Alstom; Sorefame
- Build date: 1963–1964
- Total produced: 20
Specifications
- Configuration
  - UIC: Bo′Bo′
  - Commonwealth: Bo-Bo
- Gauge: 1,668 mm (5 ft 5 21/32 in) Iberian gauge
- Wheel diameter: 1,300 mm (51 in)
- Length: 15.38 m (50 ft 5.5 in)
- Width: 3.00 m (9 ft 10.1 in)
- Height: 4.45 m (14 ft 7.2 in)
- Loco weight: 72.0 t (70.9 long tons; 79.4 short tons)
- Electric system/s: 25 kV 50 Hz AC Catenary
- Current pickup: Pantograph
- Traction motors: 709 hp (529 kW) Alstom TAO-645 A1, 4 off
- Train heating: None
- Loco brake: Air
- Train brakes: Air
- Safety systems: Convel
Performance figures
- Maximum speed: 120 km/h (75 mph)
- Power output: 2,790 hp (2,080 kW)
- Tractive effort: 191 kN (43,000 lb_{f})
Career
- Operators: Comboios de Portugal
- Numbers: 2551-2570
- Retired: 2009
- Disposition: 1 preserved, 19 scrapped

The Série 2550 were the second batch of 25 kV electric locomotives built for Portuguese Railways (CP). They entered service in 1964 and were used on the main line between Lisbon and Porto. Twenty locomotives were built with all withdrawn by 2012. Unlike the earlier Série 2500, the Série 2550 were built with unpainted stainless steel bodywork. They were built by Sorefame, with components from Alstom.

The Série 4700 were built in 2007-2009 as a replacement for the Série 2550.
