= Linha do Dão =

Railway line in Portugal

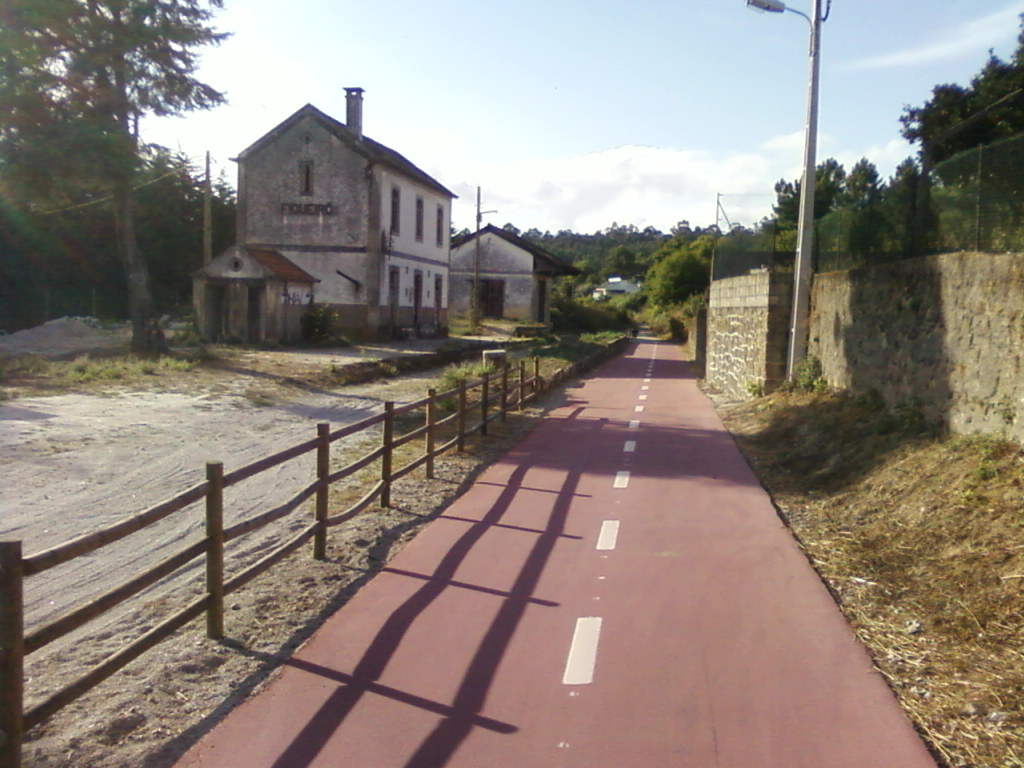
- Figueiró railway station.

Overview
- Status: Closed
- Termini: Santa Comba Dão; Viseu

Technical
- Line length: 49.2 km (30.6 mi)
- Track gauge: Metre

Location on the network
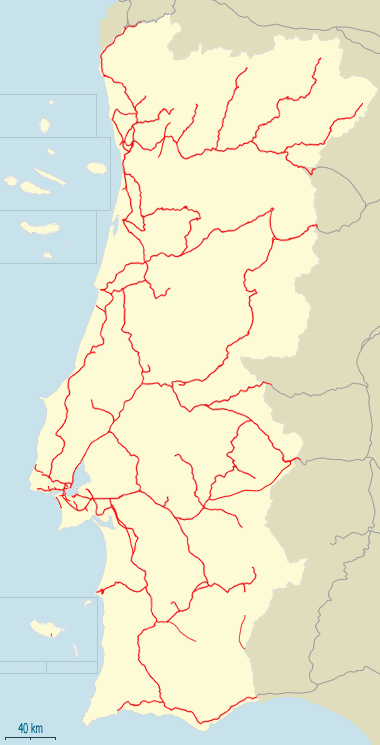

+ Santa Comba Dão × Viseu (🔎)

The Dão line (Portuguese: Linha do Dão) was a metre gauge railway line in Portugal. It ran close to the Dão River (Rio Dão), between Santa Comba Dão and Viseu Their distance is 39.6 Km. It is now a greenway for cyclists and pedestrians under the name Ecopista do Dão.

The line opened in 1890; it was closed to freight in 1972 and to passengers on 25 September 1988. The tracks have since been lifted and largely replaced by a rail trail.

== See also ==
- List of railway lines in Portugal
- List of Portuguese locomotives and railcars
- History of rail transport in Portugal
