= CP Class 4700 =

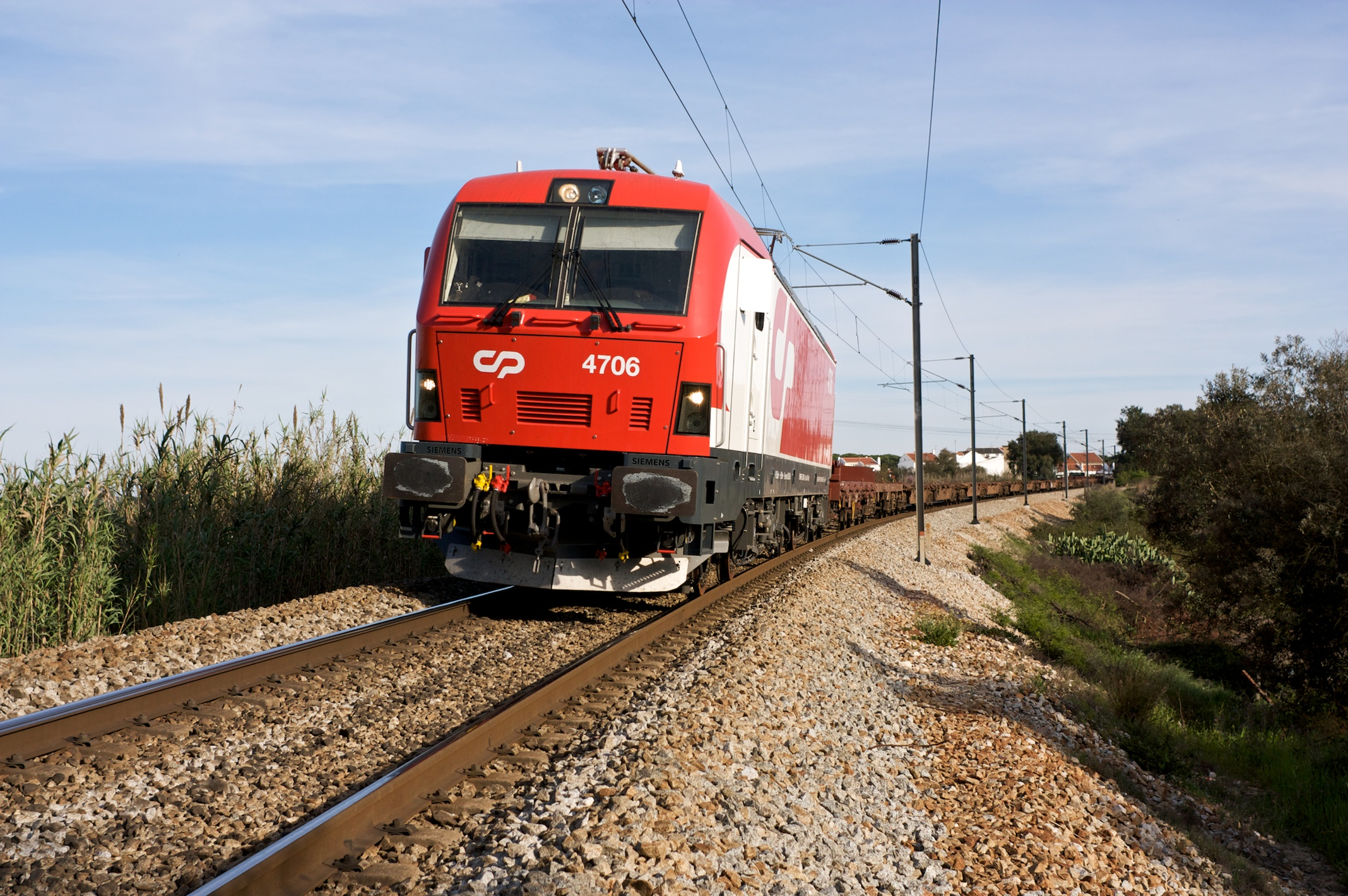
Type and origin
- Power type: Electric
- Builder: Siemens
- Model: ES46B1
- Build date: 2007–2009
- Total produced: 25
Specifications
- Configuration
  - UIC: Bo′Bo′
- Gauge: 1,668 mm (5 ft 5 21/32 in)
- Length: 19,580 mm (64 ft 2 7/8 in)
- Axle load: 21.75 t (21.41 long tons; 23.98 short tons)
- Loco weight: 87 t (85.63 long tons; 95.90 short tons)
- Electric system/s: 25 kV 50 Hz AC Catenary
- Current pickup: Pantograph
Performance figures
- Maximum speed: 140 km/h (87 mph)
- Power output: 4,600 kW (6,200 hp)
- Tractive effort: 300 kN (67,000 lb_{f})
Career
- Current owner: Medway

Class 4700 are a series of medium power electric locomotives built by Siemens for Comboios de Portugal, the state owned railway company of Portugal. They were built to replace the CP Class 2550 locomotives dating from the early 1960s. Siemens were the natural choice for the original order for 15 machines, placed in 2006, as they built the older Class 5600 locomotives in the 1990s. An option for 10 further locomotives was provided for, and this was taken up in 2007, with delivery following on from the original batch.

== EuroSprinter family ==
The 4700 locomotives are part of the EuroSprinter family of modular locomotives built by Siemens for European railway companies. These 4700 kW engines are a downgraded version of the ES64U4 (4700 kW).

These engines belong to the last EuroSprinter generation, featuring safer cabs.

=== Cab design ===
The machines feature a new cab design, meeting the latest EU safety directives in crashworthiness, a design which was continued with the Class 18 locomotives built for the Belgian state railway company.

The new Siemens Vectron also use this successful cab.
