= Tâmega line =

Railway line in Portugal

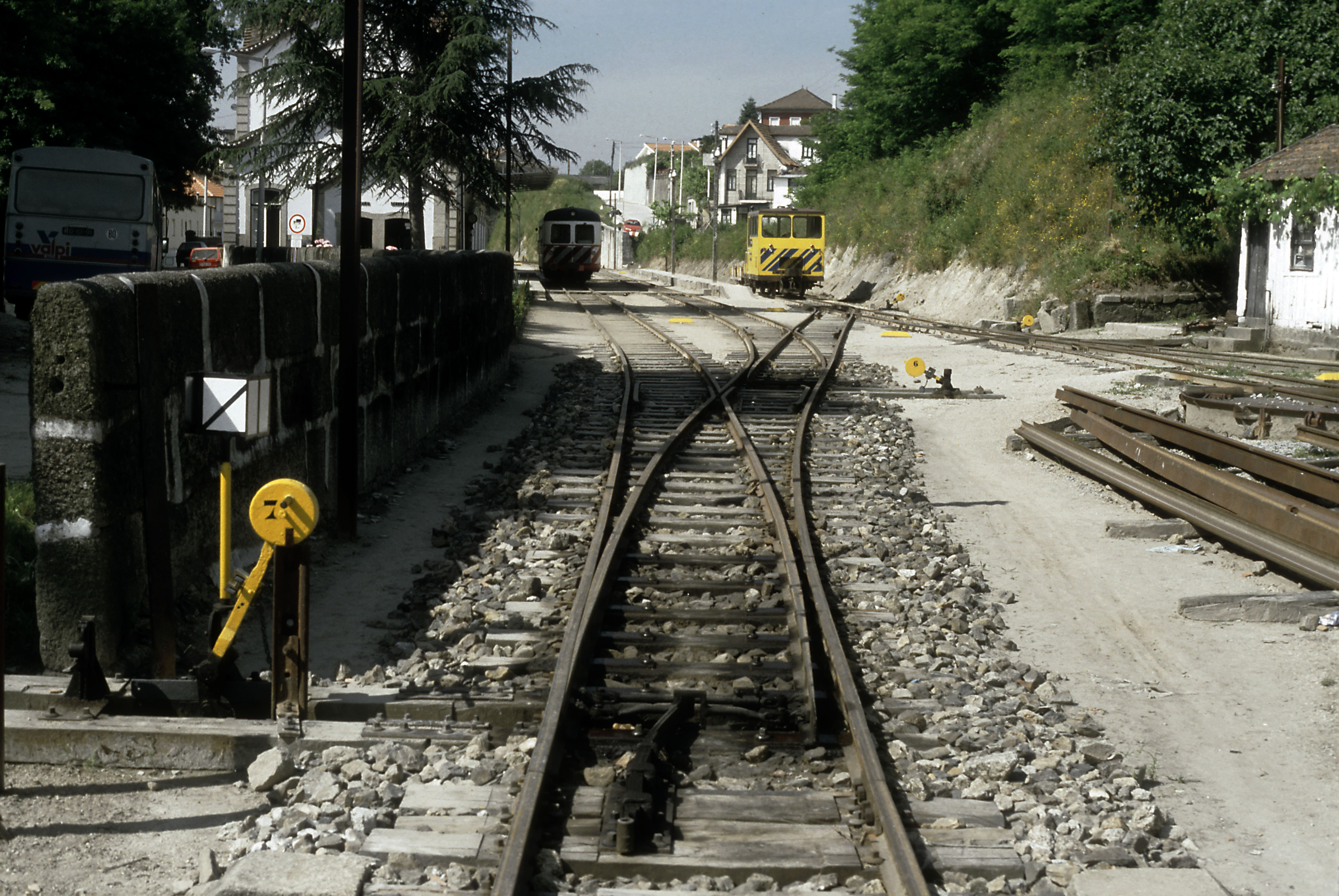
Amarante station in 1996. This station was the northern terminus of the line between 1909 and 1926 and again between 1990 and 2009

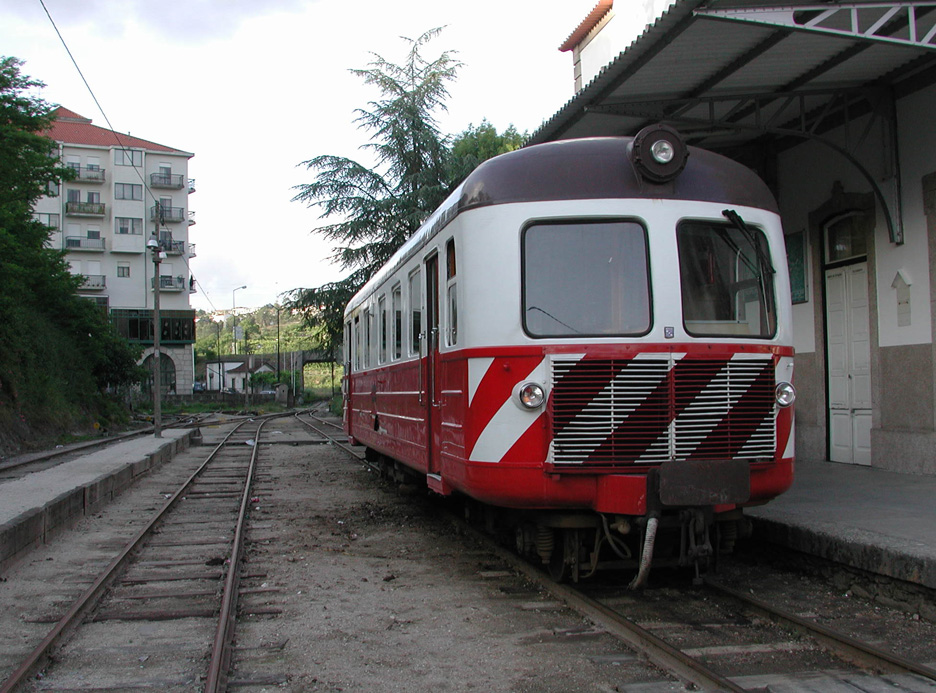
A Série 9100 railcar at Amarante station in 2002

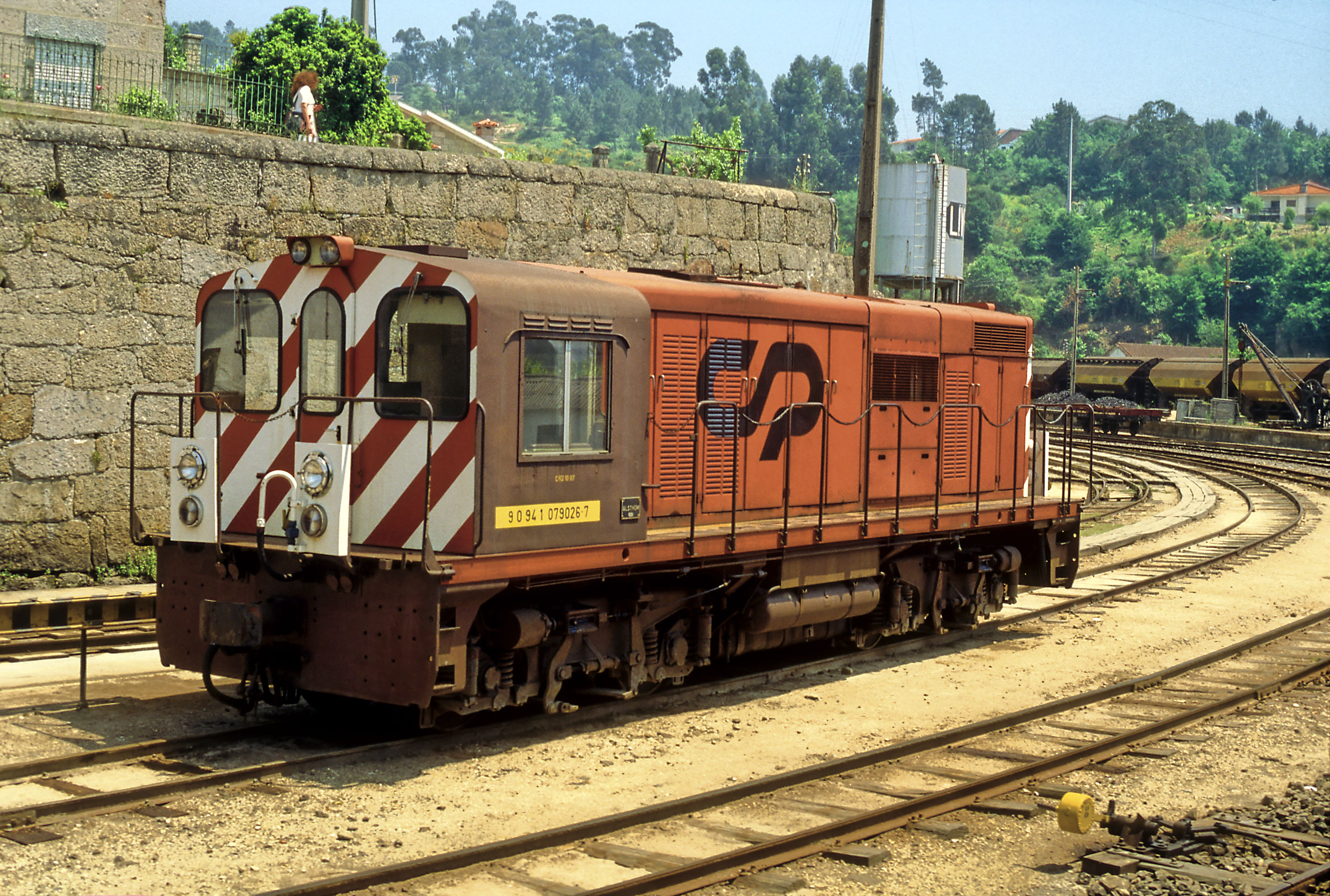
A locomotive of Série 9020, at Livração station in May 1996

The Tâmega line (Linha do Tâmega) was a 1,000 mm (3 ft 3 3/8 in) metre gauge railway line in northern Portugal. It closely followed the course of the Tâmega River. It closed in 2009.

== History ==
The southern part of the line opened in 1909; it ran between Livração (the junction with the main Douro line) and Amarante in the Porto District, near the Tâmega River. The line was eventually opened as far north as Arco de Baúlhe in 1949, the last such extension to Portugal's narrow gauge railway network. Livração station was a junction with the main Douro Valley railway line; it is still served by CP's 1,668 mm (5 ft 5 21/32 in) Iberian gauge trains to and from Porto.

Construction of section	Distance	Opened
Livração – Amarante	12.77 km	21 March 1909
Amarante - Chapa	8.43 km	22 Nov 1926
Chapa - Celorico de Basto	13.37 km	20 March 1932
Celorico de Basto - Arco de Baúlhe	17.16 km	15 Jan 1949

Train services were operated by Comboios de Portugal (CP); the three Série 9100 diesel railcars were built in 1949 by the Swedish company NOHAB specifically for use on the Tâmega line. They continued in service until 2002 (when replaced by Série 9500 units, purchased secondhand from Yugoslavia). CP Série 9020 diesel locomotives were also used on the line.

== Closure ==
The northern section of the line, between Amarante and Arco de Baúlhe, closed in 1990. Arco de Baúlhe station was served by trains for little over 40 years.

The remaining part of the line south of Amarante closed in 2009 - ostensibly due to the need for urgent repair work. The Strategic Transport Plan, published by the Portuguese Government in October 2011, showed that the Tâmega line required the highest level of subsidy (at €2.50 per passenger per kilometre) of any railway in Portugal and thus the line was listed for permanent closure. On 1 January 2012 the replacement bus service was also withdrawn.

== Other narrow gauge railways in the Douro Valley ==
- Corgo line - closed 2009
- Sabor line - closed 1988
- Tua line - closed 2008

== See also ==
- List of railway lines in Portugal
- List of Portuguese locomotives and railcars
- History of rail transport in Portugal
