= CP Class 2500 =

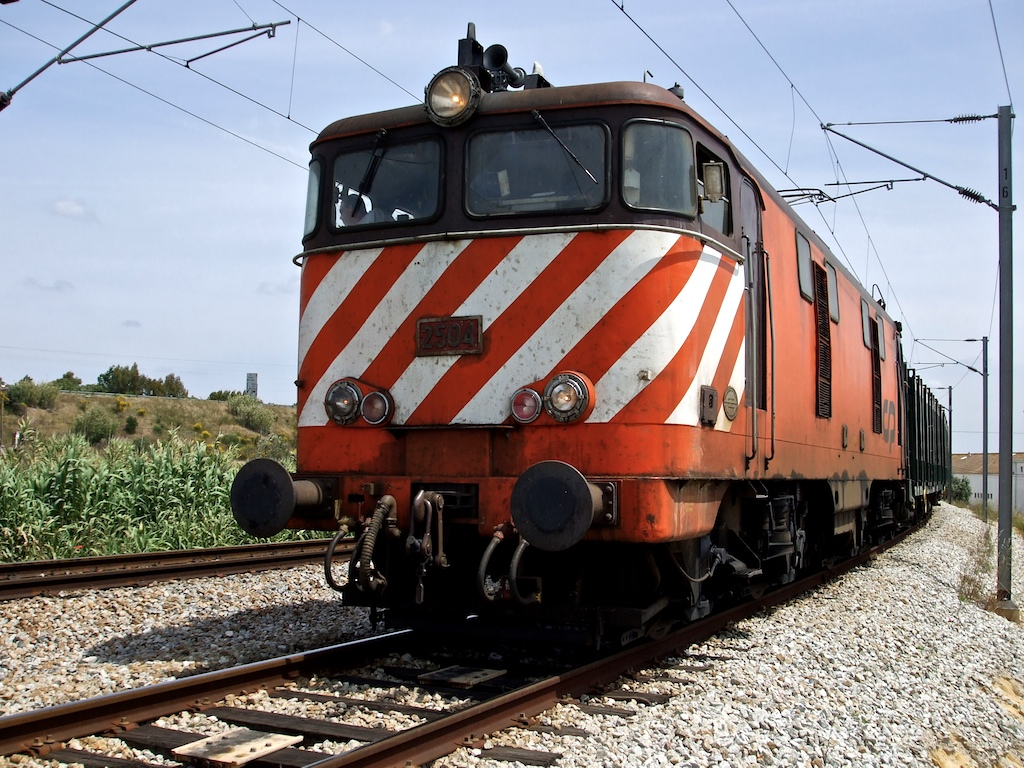
Type and origin
- Power type: Electric
- Builder: Groupement d'Étude d'Électrification Monophasé 50 Hz; Henschel; Alstom; Sorefame
- Build date: 1956-1957
- Total produced: 15
Specifications
- Configuration
  - Whyte: Bo-Bo
  - UIC: Bo′Bo′
- Gauge: 1,668 mm (5 ft 5 21/32 in) Iberian gauge
- Wheel diameter: 1,300 mm (51.18 in)
- Length: 15.38 m (50 ft 5.5 in)
- Width: 3.00 m (9 ft 10.11 in)
- Height: 4.45 m (14 ft 7.2 in)
- Loco weight: 72.0 t (70.9 long tons; 79.4 short tons)
- Electric system/s: 25 kV 50 Hz AC Catenary
- Current pickup: Pantograph
- Traction motors: 709 hp (529 kW) Alstom TAO-645 A1, 4 off
- Train heating: None
- Loco brake: Air
- Train brakes: Air
- Safety systems: Convel
Performance figures
- Maximum speed: 120 km/h (75 mph)
- Power output: 2,790 hp (2,080 kW)
- Tractive effort: 191 kN (43,000 lb_{f})
Career
- Operators: Comboios de Portugal
- Numbers: 2501-2515
- Retired: 2009
- Disposition: One preserved, remainder scrapped

Série 2500 were the first 15 electric locomotives built for the Portuguese Railways (CP). They entered service in 1956, for the newly electrified 25 kV line running north from Lisbon. They had a maximum speed of 120 km/h. They were withdrawn from service in 2009; all but one have been sold for scrap.
