= 1100 class =

1100 class or Class 1100 may refer to:

- LRTA 1100 class, Manila light-rail vehicles
- New South Wales 1100 class railcar
- NS Class 1100, electric locomotives
