= British Rail Class 58 =

Class of Co-Co diesel-electric locomotives

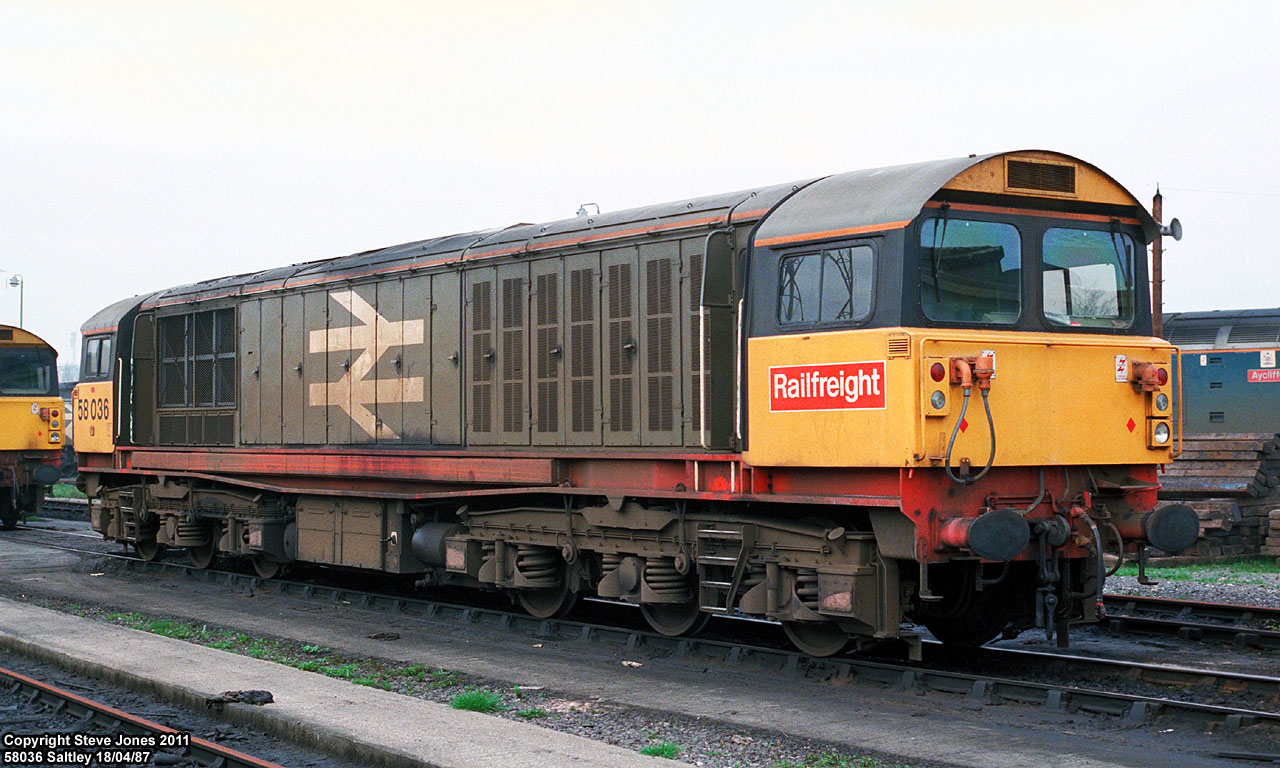
- A class 58 at Saltley in 1987
Type and origin
- Power type: Diesel-electric
- Builder: British Rail Engineering Limited, Doncaster Works
- Build date: 1983–1987
- Total produced: 50
Specifications
- Configuration
  - UIC: Co′Co′
  - Commonwealth: Co-Co
- Gauge: 1,435 mm (4 ft 8 1/2 in) standard gauge
- Wheel diameter: 1,120 mm (44.09 in)
- Minimum curve: 4 chains (264.00 ft; 80.47 m)
- Wheelbase: bogie: 4.18 m (13 ft 9 in); bogie centres: 14.86 m (48 ft 9 in)
- Length: 19.13 m (62 ft 9 in)
- Width: 2.72 m (8 ft 11 in)
- Height: 3.91 m (12 ft 10 in)
- Loco weight: 130 tonnes (127.9 long tons; 143.3 short tons)
- Fuel capacity: 4,480 litres (990 imp gal; 1,180 US gal)
- Prime mover: Ruston Paxman 12RK3ACT
- RPM
  - Maximum RPM: 1000 rpm
- Alternator: Brush BA1101B
- Traction motors: Brush TM73-62
- Cylinder size: 254 mm × 305 mm (10.0 in × 12.0 in), bore × stroke
- MU working: ◆ Red Diamond
- Train brakes: Air
- Safety systems: AWS, DSD
Performance figures
- Maximum speed: 80 mph (130 km/h)
- Power output: Engine: 3,300 hp (2,460 kW); At Rail: 2,387 hp (1,780 kW)
- Tractive effort: Maximum: 60,000 lbf (267 kN)
- Brakeforce: 60 tonnes (59.1 long tons; 66.1 short tons)
Career
- Operators: British Rail; EWS / DB Cargo UK
- Numbers: 58 001-58 050
- Nicknames: Bone
- Axle load class: Route availability 7
- Withdrawn: 1999–2002
- Disposition: 5 currently preserved, 36 exported to France or Spain where 5 remain stored, remainder scrapped

The British Rail Class 58 is a class of Co-Co diesel locomotive designed for heavy freight. The narrow body with cabs at either end led to them being given the nickname "Bone" by rail enthusiasts.

Their design represented a major departure from British conventions of construction; amongst the innovations was the adoption of the American practice of modularisation. The first locomotive of the class was delivered to British Rail during early 1983 and entered service that same year. Despite expectations of a lengthy service life, during 2002, EWS decided to withdraw all examples of the type after only 19 years in service. Subsequently, 32 were hired abroad – four to the Netherlands, eight to Spain and twenty to France. A few examples have also been scrapped or have entered preservation.

== History ==
During the mid-1970s, British Rail operated several different diesel locomotives that had been categorised as Type 5, these being a relatively high-powered locomotive suited to heavy freight trains, the newest of which being the British Rail Class 56. Initial experiences with the latter had proved the type to be somewhat unreliable in service, a factor which had led to dissatisfaction amongst several of British Rail's freight customers. Officials within British Rail also observed that the international market for a competitive freight locomotive could be quite lucrative, and thus there were pressures to enter the export market with a suitable design. Furthermore, British Rail had forecast that the domestic rail freight sector was set to grow, and that the prospects for such growth only improved if more capable locomotives, particularly in terms of reliability, were available to service such trains.

Accordingly, by the late 1970s, there was considerable pressure within British Rail for the development of a new, low-cost, easily maintainable freight locomotive. Thus, despite multiple follow-on orders for Class 56 being placed during the mid-1970s, British Rail also authorised a feasibility study into the development of a new freight locomotive by British Rail Engineering Limited (BREL) for the export market. Export potential was an important consideration; pre-production drawings of the Class 58s referred to the type as "Standard Export Locomotives". BREL engineers were involved in the effort from the conceptual stage of development, bringing design and production planning into close alignment. In the concept phase, the locomotive incorporated features such as modularisation and recently developed manufacturing techniques to lower both manufacturing and maintenance costs.

Once the design for the new locomotive had been approved by the British Railways Board, the contract to build the type was awarded to BREL's Doncaster Works. Material ordering for the new Class 58 commenced during 1979. To accommodate the manufacturing programme, BREL embarked on a major multi-million pound upgrade of 'E2' shop, which is where final assembly of the Class 58 would be performed. BREL dropped traditional locomotive construction methods in favour of an entirely new approach – an innovative modular design. This offered savings on construction and maintenance compared to previous locomotive builds. The load-bearing underframe was fitted with exchangeable modules – number 1 cab, radiator, power unit, turbocharger, electrical equipment and number 2 cab. If required, each module could be easily removed from the underframe and replaced.

During January 1982, British Rail felt sufficiently confident in the project's progress to place an order for an initial batch of 35 locomotives. During 1984, the construction of a further 15 Class 58s was also authorised.

== Design ==
The British Rail Class 58 is a diesel-electric locomotive primarily intended for heavy freight operations. Structurally, it consists of a strong underframe designed to bear all the static loads imposed by the equipment in addition to the dynamic forces exerted during its service life; it was designed to have a zero possibility of fatigue failure across its anticipated lifespan of thirty-five years as well as to satisfy end-load requirements stipulated by the International Union of Railways (UIC). All major apparatus and associated equipment on board use modular construction, which enabled the type to be fitted out on the shop floor away from the final assembly area, minimising workplace congestion as well as overall assembly time. Much of the wiring was pre-loomed to also reduce the assembly time required.

The cab is a complete unit, having been designed to be fitted out with all systems as a complete module. The cab is resiliently mounted and is designed to satisfy the UIC requirements for both crashworthiness and strength; the Class 58 is allegedly the first design to meet the crashworthiness requirements. Much of this strength comes from a substantial hollow-rolled beam section running beneath the front windows, which is braced to floor level by two sections running diagonally down the inside of the cab's side-walls. The rear bulkhead is also a strong structural element, designed to prevent the cab's collapse in the event of derailment as well as to serve as an anchoring point for lifting/righting the vehicle. Access to the cab is via a single central door set in the rear bulkhead, opening into a cross-corridor aft of the cab; there is no means of direct external access. The cab was so well received that its design later served as the basis for subsequent British Rail locomotives.

The engine used is a Ruston Paxman 12RK3ACT unit, rated to produce up to 3,300 HP (2,460 kW). While the same engine family was used in the Class 56, the Class 58 was able to achieve a 5–6 percent reduction in fuel consumption, in part due to simplification measures such as a lower cylinder count and the use of only a single turbocharger. A significant emphasis on component reduction and reliability was present during the Class 58's design due to the persistent reliability issues suffered by the preceding Class 56. The engine incorporates a silencer to lower noise emissions, which was in part necessitated to meet future noise restriction standards being developed by the European Economic Community; this silencer is directly mounted to the engine rather than the locomotive's body, and projects upwards via a clearance hole in the roof, surrounded by a gutter to collect rain. The arrangement was facilitated by the elimination of the air inlet manifolds, which were incorporated into the crankshaft's centre.

The superstructure is divided into sections by bulkheads, the placement of which was intended to optimally manage airflow. A relatively lightweight roof is used, being formed from removable sections that can be manually stacked on top of one another. A total of thirty-two identically sized doors line either side, these open in pairs and lift away to provide access for both maintenance and the initial assembly process. These are composed of pressed steel construction for strength while remaining relatively lightweight. The underframe has a relatively low bending frequency, thus careful positioning of the bogies in relation to the underframe was required to minimise body flexing.

The electrical equipment consisted of a brushless three-phase main alternator directly coupled to the engine, along with an auxiliary alternator. The output is fed via a rectification unit to DC traction motors; both the traction motors and alternators are interchangeable with those used on the Class 56. The principle control gear is accommodated within a transverse-mounted cubicle. The brake control system was based on the Poussoir Bouton Locomotive (PBL) system, being less complicated and using cheaper control values than traditional alternatives. Incidents of wheelslip were observed during the type's initial operations; remedial adjustments included additional sanding equipment and softer primary vertical springs on the centre axle to improve equalisation across all axles. Further measures were examined, including the revision of the slow-speed motor control system.

== Operations ==
=== Domestic service ===
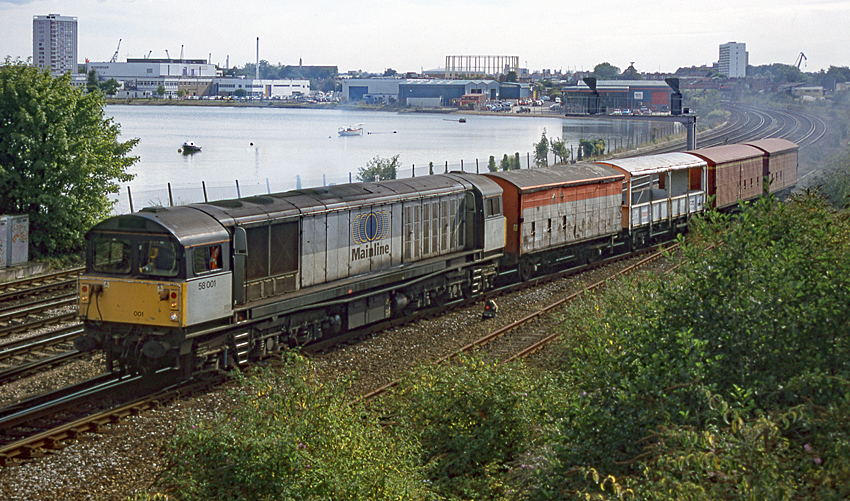
58 001 on a very short train at St Denys

On 9 December 1982, the first locomotive, 58 001, was formally handed over to British Rail at Doncaster Works. Initial trials of this locomotive revealed that the climate control systems for the driver were less effective when driven at high speeds; this was rectified by the relocation of the air intake from the bottom of the front plate to either side of the crash beam, immediately beneath the windscreen. Within its two years of operation, the Class 58 had reportedly proved to be considerably more reliable than the preceding Class 56.

Deliveries of further locomotives continued until early 1987, at which point the final example, 58 050, was delivered. This locomotive was temporarily fitted with a SEPEX wheelslip control system, but upon completion of experimental testing, this equipment was removed before the locomotive entered traffic. While not seeing further use on the Class 58, the SEPEX control system was a central feature in the design of the Class 60. Despite hopes of obtaining export orders for the type, no overseas customers were forthcoming. The jigs at Doncaster were dismantled and 58 050 became the last diesel locomotive to be produced at 'The Plant'.

Since their introduction to service during the early 1980s, the Class 58 saw service on a variety of freight duties. Despite claims made at the time, their performance was actually inferior to Class 56s on many types of freight train due to their increased tendency to wheelslip, largely as a result of bogie design. Although originally allocated to coal traffic, their arrival coincided with the miners' strike; it has been alleged that British Rail had only tolerated the construction of so many units because the components for their manufacture were already on order. As a result, the 58s could also be seen working other types of freight traffic. With the advent of privatisation in the 1990s, Class 58s greatly extended the geographical scope of their operations and were used on general freight traffic until withdrawal.

=== Service in Continental Europe ===
During 2000, EWS announced that eight Class 58s were to be transferred to Spain, where they were initially hired to Spanish infrastructure operator GIF. Subsequently, a large number of Class 58s, alongside numerous Class 56s, operated in France for Fertis, TSO and Seco Rail.

In May 2007, all of the locomotives from the French contract were returned to the UK and placed back into storage. The Spanish locomotives remain active however now under the ownership of Transfesa. The locomotives that were returned to the UK were sent back abroad to France between May and October 2009, as these units had been hired to operators Travaux du Sud-Ouest (TSO) and Eurovia Travaux Ferroviaires (ETF). The Dutch locomotives were prepared for further use in France before being transported to France in July 2009.

=== Withdrawal ===
During the late 1990s, it was almost certain that the entire Class 58 fleet would see service into the next millennium as working locomotives. However, despite being quoted as EWS's most reliable and consistent Type 5s, during 1999 it was announced that a large number of Class 58s were going to be placed into long-term storage: 58 017 was the first to be stored, quickly followed by 58 022. Since then, the remainder of the Class 58s went into storage, initially at various sites around Britain. The type's withdrawal was hastened by the introduction of 250 Class 66s. During September 2002, the last few Class 58 locomotives were withdrawn after working the last charter train, the "Bone Idol" from King's Cross to Skegness and return.

Seven Class 58s were put on the DB Schenker April 2010 disposals list; this was the first time stored Class 58s had been put up for sale. One of these, 58 016, has entered preservation at Barrow Hill with the Class 58 Locomotive Group (C58LG). A further five Class 58s were listed for disposal by DB Schenker on their October 2015 disposals list, these being 58 008, 58 012, 58 022, 58 023, and 58 048. During January 2016, it was reported that DB Schenker had disposed of its last Class 58s in the UK. Of these 58 012, 58 022, 58 023, and 58 048 were saved for preservation but 58 008 was scrapped by Raxstar.

According to Railways Illustrated, the fleet's operational history could be summarised as a shocking waste, with none of the locomotives being life-expired upon withdrawal. The periodical also noted the irony of much of the class being in storage depots across France while there was a shortage of locomotives in the UK during the mid-2010s.

== Accidents and incidents ==
- On 6 August 1987, locomotive No. 58 013 was hauling a freight train that ran away from Baddesley Colliery, Warwickshire, and was derailed at Kingsbury Sidings.

== Fleet list ==
| Key: | Withdrawn/Stored (Exported) | Preserved | Scrapped |

| Number | Name | Built | UK Withdrawal | Export | Status | Disposal |
|---|---|---|---|---|---|---|
| 58 001 | | 9 Dec 1982 | 8 Oct 1999 | 13 Aug 2009 | Scrapped | Alizay, France, May 2023. |
| 58 002 | Daw Mill Colliery; 17 Mar 1988 | 9 May 1983 | 9 Nov 2000 | | Scrapped | European Metal Recycling (EMR) at Eastleigh, December 2013. |
| 58 003 | Markham Colliery; Jul 1988 | 31 Jul 1983 | 29 Nov 1999 | | Scrapped | EMR at Kingsbury, 2010. |
| 58 004 | | 30 Sep 1983 | 9 Jan 2002 | 15 Oct 2004 | Scrapped | Alizay, France, May 2023. |
| 58 005 | Ironbridge Power Station; 12 May 96 | 31 Oct 1983 | 13 Oct 2000 | 20 Jun 2009 | Scrapped | Scrapped at Euro Cargo Rail's Alizay depot |
| 58 006 | | 31 Oct 1983 | 11 Jan 200 | 24 Nov 2009 | Scrapped | Scrapped at Euro Cargo Rail's Alizay depot in early July 2023. |
| 58 007 | Drakelow Power Station; 25 Aug 1990 | 31 Nov 1983 | 19 Jan 2000 | 14 Oct 2004 | Scrapped | Scrapped at Euro Cargo Rail's Alizay depot |
| 58 008 | | 31 Dec 1983 | 29 Nov 1999 | | Scrapped | Raxstar at Eastleigh Works, in 2016. |
| 58 009 | | 31 Jan 1984 | 16 Jan 2002 | 3 Nov 2004 | Scrapped | Scrapped at Euro Cargo Rail's Alizay depot |
| 58 010 | Audrey Newton; 12 Dec 1987 (worn for 1 day only) | 29 Feb 1984 | 8 Dec 1999 | 23 Jun 2004 | Scrapped | Scrapped at Euro Cargo Rail's Alizay depot |
| 58 011 | Worksop Depot; 5 Sep 1993 | 31 Mar 1984 | 7 Dec 1999 | 30 Jun 2005 | Scrapped | Scrapped at Euro Cargo Rail's Alizay depot in early July 2023. |
| 58 012 | | 31 Mar 1984 | 5 Dec 1999 | | Stored | Purchased for preservation, in 2016, from Ron Hull Jr's scrapyard and now stored at the Battlefield Line awaiting restoration. |
| 58 013 | | 31 Mar 1984 | 26 Apr 2001 | 24 Jun 2001 | Scrapped | Scrapped at Euro Cargo Rail's Alizay depot in early July 2023. |
| 58 014 | Didcot Power Station; 11 Jun 1988 | 30 Apr 1984 | 17 Nov 2000 | | Scrapped | EMR at Kingsbury, 2010. |
| 58 015 | | 30 Sep 1984 | 8 Oct 1999 | 7 Oct 2004 | Scrapped | Metal Colomer SL at Monforte-del-Cid, Spain, 13 January 2020 |
| 58 016 | | 5 Oct 1984 | 5 Aug 2002 | 14 May 2005 | Under Restoration | Purchased for preservation on 28 Jun 10 by the C58LG and now undergoing restoration. |
| 58 017 | Eastleigh Depot; 26 Apr 95 | 31 Oct 1984 | 30 Apr 1999 | | Scrapped | EMR at Eastleigh, December 2013. |
| 58 018 | High Marnham Power Station; 21 May 1988 | 31 Oct 1984 | 7 Dec 1999 | 23 Aug 2005 | Scrapped | Scrapped at Euro Cargo Rail's Alizay depot |
| 58 019 | Shirebrook Colliery; 1 Oct 1989 | 30 Nov 1984 | 7 Apr 2001 | | Scrapped | EMR at Kingsbury, 2010. |
| 58 020 | Doncaster Works BRE; 7 Nov 1984; Doncaster Works; May 1987 | 30 Nov 1984 | 2 Sep 2002 | 23 May 2004 | Scrapped | Metal Colomer SL at Monforte-del-Cid, Spain, 12 December 2019 |
| 58 021 | Hither Green Depot; 28 Oct 1985 | 31 Dec 1984 | 3 Aug 2002 | 13 Jul 2005 | Scrapped | Scrapped at Euro Cargo Rail's Alizay depot |
| 58 022 | | 31 Dec 1984 | 11 Mar 2002 | | Being Dismantled | Owned by Ivatt Diesel Recreation Society. The chassis is being used for the re-creation of the LMS pioneer diesel 10000. Cabs removed in June 2022. |
| 58 023 | Peterborough Depot; 2 Jun 95 | 31 Dec 1984 | 24 Jul 1999 | | Operational. | Purchased in 2016 along with 58 012. Based at the Battlefield Line and returned to service in November 2016. Now operational in private ownership. |
| 58 024 | | 31 Dec 1984 | 2 Sep 2002 | 23 May 2004 | Scrapped | Metal Colomer SL at Monforte-del-Cid, Spain, 25 November 2019 |
| 58 025 | | 31 Jan 1985 | 5 Aug 2002 | 23 May 2004 | Stored (Albacete, Spain) | |
| 58 026 | | 31 Mar 1985 | 16 Jan 2 | 20 Jun 2009 | Scrapped | Alizay, France, May 2023. |
| 58 027 | | 31 Mar 1985 | 5 Sep 1999 | 21 Oct 2004 | Stored (Albacete, Spain) | |
| 58 028 | | 31 Mar 1985 | 29 Oct 1999 | | Scrapped | EMR at Kingsbury, 2010. |
| 58 029 | | 31 Mar 1985 | 25 Jun 2002 | 23 May 2004 | Scrapped | Metal Colomer SL at Monforte-del-Cid, Spain, 20 January 2020 |
| 58 030 | | 30 Jun 1985 | 1 Aug 2002 | 23 May 2004 | Scrapped | Metal Colomer SL at Monforte-del-Cid, Spain, 19 December 2019 |
| 58 031 | Cabellero Ferroviario; 8 Jun | 30 Sep 1985 | 6 Apr 2002 | 23 May 2004 | Scrapped | Metal Colomer SL at Monforte-del-Cid, Spain, 3 February 2020 |
| 58 032 | Thoresby Colliery; Oct 95 | 30 Sep 1985 | 12 Jan 2000 | 19 Oct 2004 | Scrapped | Alizay, France, May 2023. |
| 58 033 | | 30 Sep 1985 | 31 Aug 02 | 28 Oct 04 | Scrapped | Scrapped (Alizay, France) c.March 2023 |
| 58 034 | Bassetlaw; 12 Dec 1985 | 30 Nov 1985 | 18 Aug 1999 | 21 Oct 2004 | Scrapped | Alizay, France, May 2023. |
| 58 035 | | 31 Jan 1986 | 30 Jun 1999 | 27 Oct 2004 | Scrapped | Scrapped at Euro Cargo Rail's Alizay depot |
| 58 036 | | 28 Feb 1986 | 10 Mar 2000 | 11 Sep 1999 | Scrapped | Scrapped at Euro Cargo Rail's Alizay depot |
| 58 037 | Worksop Depot; 26 Jun 2000 | 28 Feb 1986 | 8 Apr 2002 | | Scrapped | EMR at Eastleigh, December 2013. |
| 58 038 | | 28 Feb 1986 | 4 Dec 1999 | 7 May 2005 | Scrapped | Alizay, France, May 2023. |
| 58 039 | Rugeley Power Station; 13 Sep 1986 | 31 Mar 1986 | 30 Dec 1999 | 25 Jun 2003 | Scrapped | Scrapped at Euro Cargo Rail's Alizay depot |
| 58 040 | Cottam Power Station; 20 Sep 1986 | 31 Mar 1986 | 7 Dec 1999 | 13 Nov 2004 | Scrapped | Scrapped at Euro Cargo Rail's Alizay depot in early July 2023. |
| 58 041 | Ratcliffe Power Station; 6 Sep 1986 | 31 Mar 1986 | 8 Jul 2002 | 3 Apr 2003 | Stored (Albacete, Spain) | |
| 58 042 | Ironbridge Power Station; 29 Sep 1986; Petrolea; 5 Feb 96 | 31 May 1986 | 13 Apr 2002 | 20 Aug 2009 | Scrapped | Alizay, France, May 2023. |
| 58 043 | Knottingly; 25 Apr 1993 | 31 Jul 1986 | 1 Aug 2002 | 3 Apr 2003 | Scrapped | Metal Colomer SL at Monforte-del-Cid, Spain, 28 January 2020 |
| 58 044 | Oxcroft Opencast; 9 May 92 | 31 Aug 1986 | 24 Jul 1999 | 16 Oct 2003 | Stored (Woippy Yard, Metz, France) | |
| 58 045 | | 30 Sep 1986 | 31 Aug 2002 | | Scrapped | Purchased on 7 Jul 10 by the C58LG to provide spares for 58 016. Later cut up at EMR Kingsbury in 2010. |
| 58 046 | Thoresby Colliery; 29 Jun 1991; Ashfordby Mine; 27 Sep 95 | 31 Oct 1986 | 13 Jan 2000 | 9 Sep 2004 | Scrapped | Scrapped at Euro Cargo Rail's Alizay depot |
| 58 047 | Manton Colliery; 28 Apr 92 | 31 Oct 1986 | 4 Sep 2002 | 28 Oct 2004 | Scrapped | Metal Colomer SL at Monforte-del-Cid, Spain, 5 December 2019 |
| 58 048 | Coventry Colliery; 11 May 1991 | 30 Nov 1986 | 19 Jan 2000 | | Under restoration | Purchased in 2016 from Crewe EMD with 58 022. |
| 58 049 | Littleton Colliery; 14 Mar 1987 | 31 Dec 1986 | 29 May 2002 | 17 Nov 2004 | Scrapped | Scrapped at Euro Cargo Rail's Alizay depot in early July 2023. |
| 58 050 | Toton Traction Depot; 9 May 1987 | 31 Mar 1987 | 5 Aug 2002 | 18 Sep 2008 | Stored (Albacete, Spain) | |

== Preservation ==
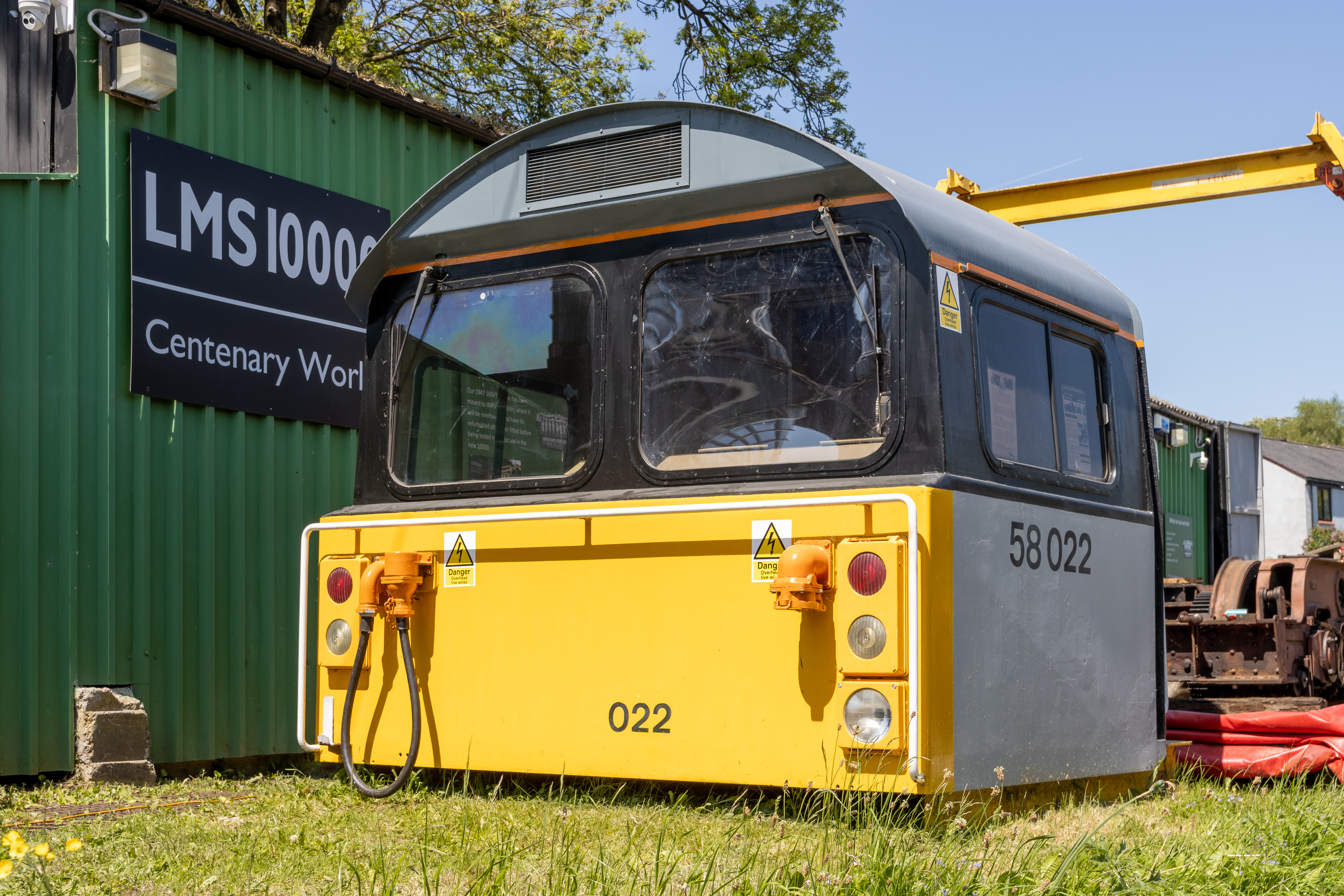
The removed cab of 58 022

On 28 June 2010, DB Schenker confirmed that the Class 58 Locomotive Group's bid for 58 016 had been accepted and thus the locomotive would become the first preserved example of its type. Shortly afterwards, on 7 July, the group announced they had also acquired another locomotive, 58 045, as a spares donor. A subsequent posting on the group's website said that the stripping of 58 045 had proceeded apace and all parts recovered were to be initially stored until the restoration of 58 016 commences properly.

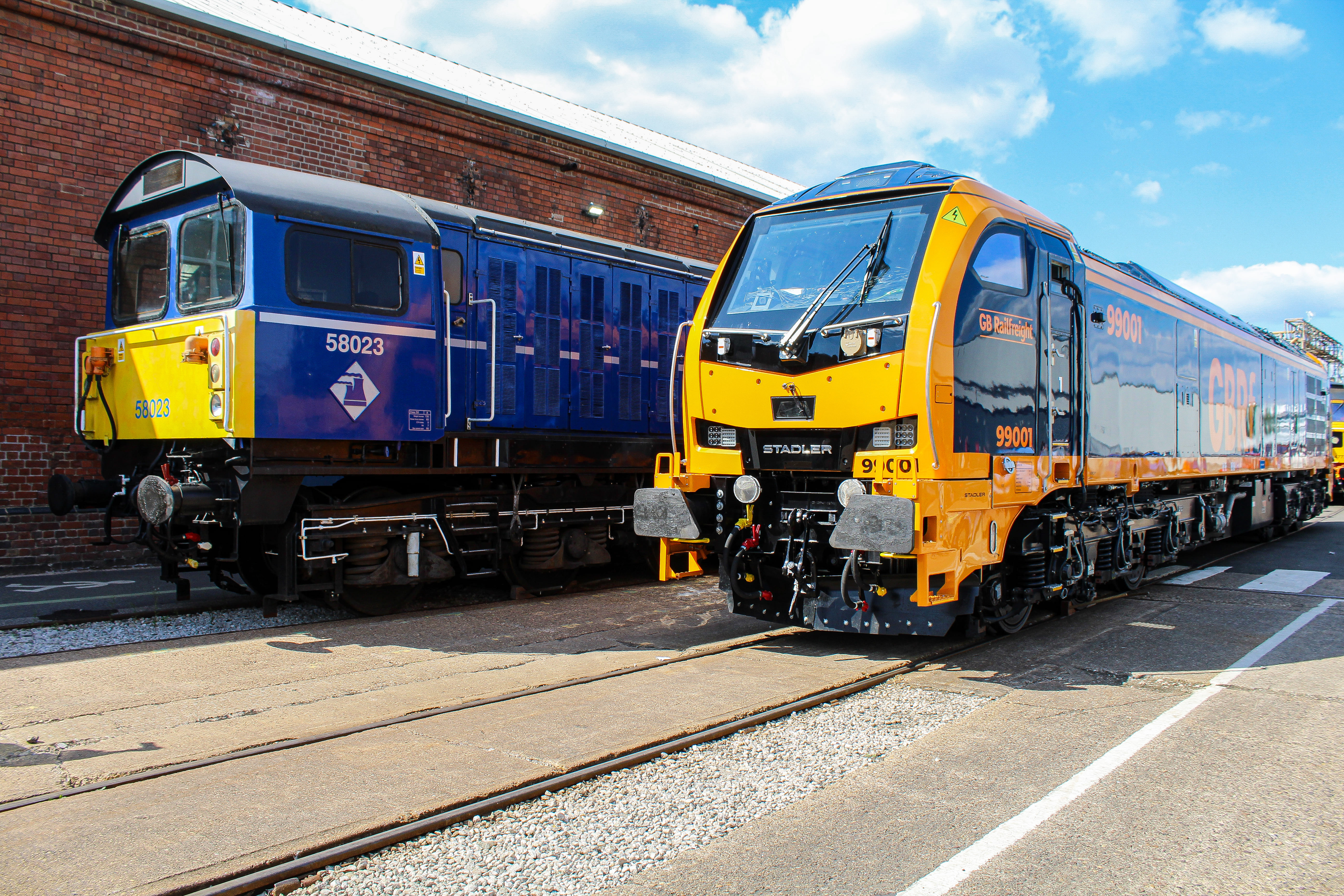
58023 and 99001 at the Greatest Gathering, Derby 2025

In 2016, 58 012 and 58 023 were saved from Ron Hull Jr's scrapyard at Rotherham and are now preserved at the Battlefield Line, privately owned. 58 023 is now in running order, and there are also plans to restore 58 012 to running order as well.

58 048 is also owned by the Battlefield Line however it is planned that it will be saved for preservation to join the heritage roster.

58 022 was purchased by the Ivatt Diesel Recreation Society, with plans to use it as the chassis in the new build class D16/1 LMS 10000.

In 2002, 58 050 was nominated by the Railway Heritage Committee for preservation at the conclusion of its service life.

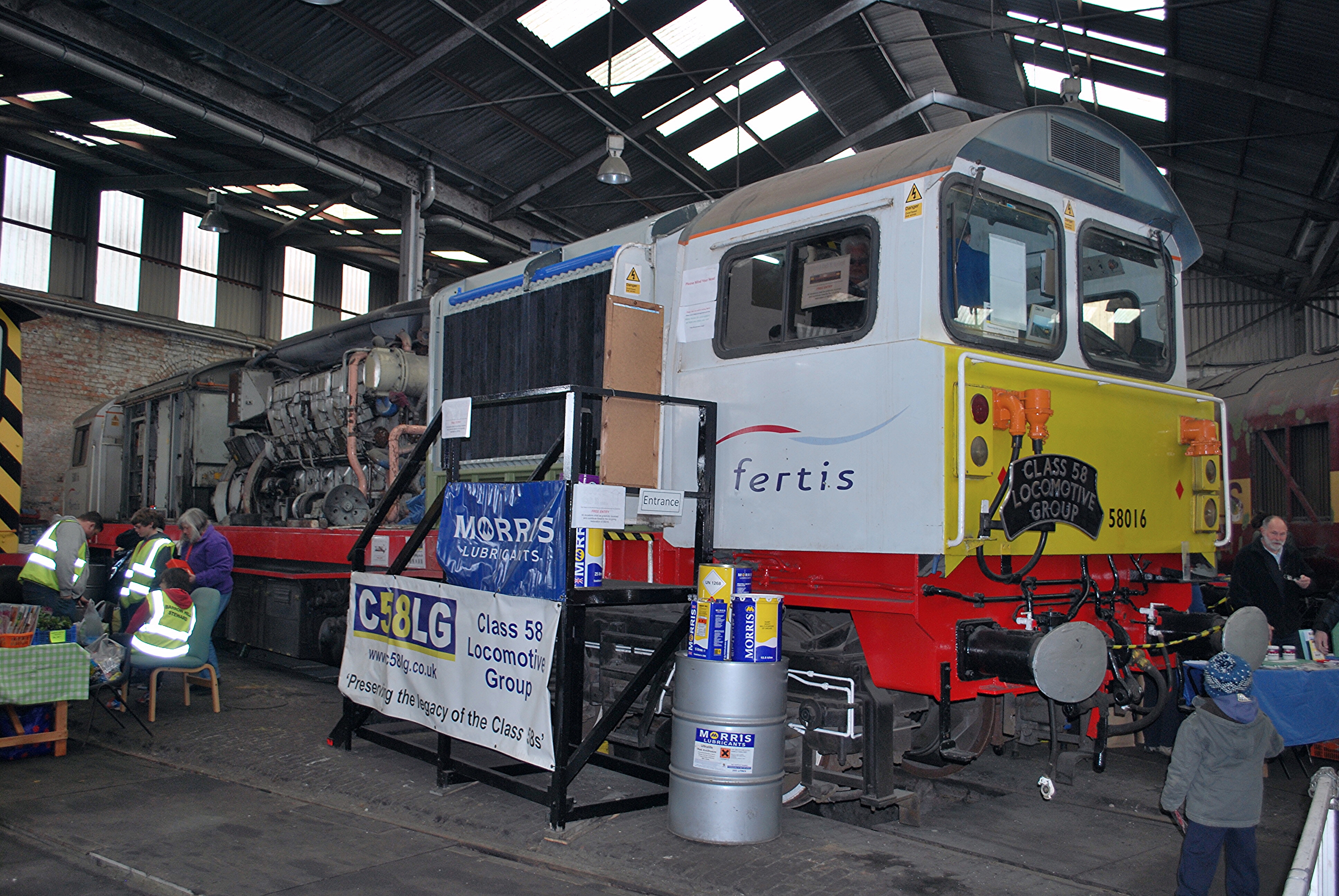
Fertis Class 58 in Preservation

As of 2018, five members of the class have been preserved, in addition one cab of 58 008 has also been preserved.

=== List of preserved locomotives ===
| Number | Name | Livery | Status | Location | Notes |
|---|---|---|---|---|---|
| 58 012 | N/A | N/A | Stored | Battlefield Line | Purchased from Ron Hull Jr's scrapyard in 2016 and now stored awaiting restoration. |
| 58 016 | N/A | Fertis Grey | Under Restoration | Leicester LIP | Purchased for preservation in October 2010 to become the first member of class to be preserved. |
| 58 022 | N/A | N/A | dismantled | Ecclesbourne Valley Railway | Purchased from Ron Hull Jr's scrapyard in 2016 and now stored awaiting deconstruction, with the frames destined for the new build class D16/1 LMS 10000. Locomotive transferred from Peak Rail to Ecclesbourne Valley Railway in August 2020. |
| 58 023 | Peterborough Depot | Mainline Blue | Operational | Leicester LIP | Purchased for preservation in 2016 from Ron Hull Jr's scrapyard along with 58 012 and 58 048 and moved to the Battlefield Line. This was the first Class 58 to be started in preservation. |
| 58 048 | Coventry Colliery | N/A | Under Restoration | Battlefield Line | Purchased from Ron Hull Jr's scrapyard in 2016 along with 58 012 and 58 023 and now undergoing restoration. |

== Livery ==
From new, all locomotives were outshopped in Railfreight grey, with yellow ends and red solebars. The introduction of Railfreight sector liveries from October 1987 saw 58 050 outshopped by Stratford in the new triple grey scheme, complete with the Trainload Freight coal sub-sector logo. Eventually the majority of the fleet were repainted in triple grey livery. Upon shadow privatisation of the UK freight business, Mainline Freight became the owners of the 50 strong fleet, which saw a small number re-painted into the operator's aircraft blue and silver livery, while others had Mainline Freight branding applied to the triple grey bodywork. With full privatisation and the takeover of the freight operations by EWS, maroon and gold became the standard livery for repainted examples from mid-1997 and beyond.

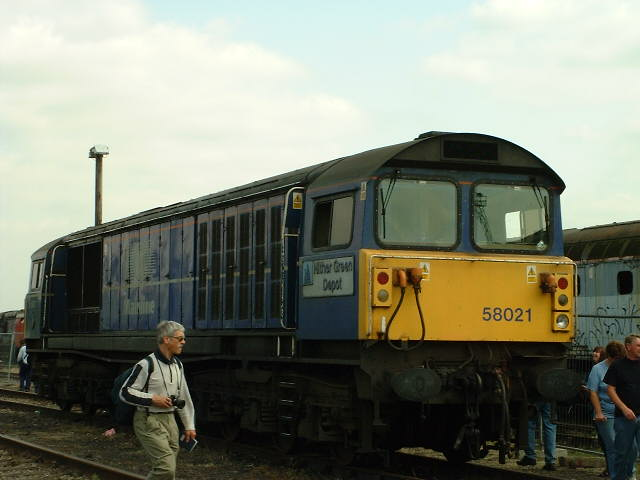
58 021 in Mainline Freight livery (2000)

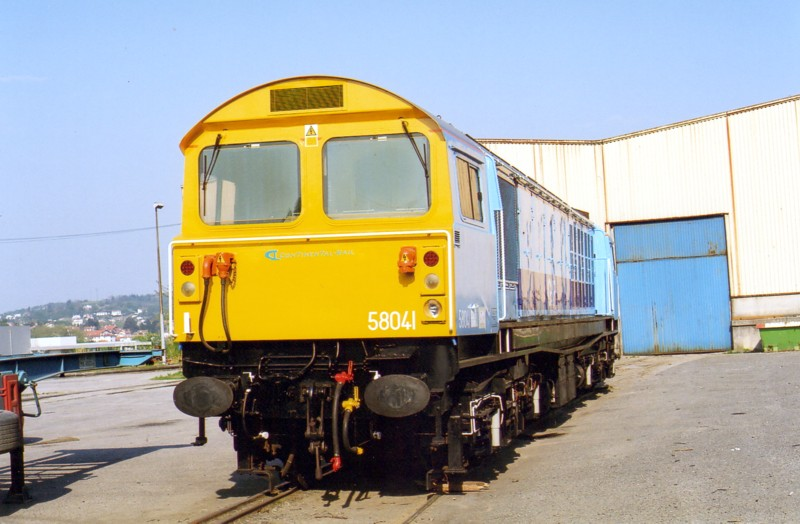
Spanish infrastructure operator GIF's livery (2003)

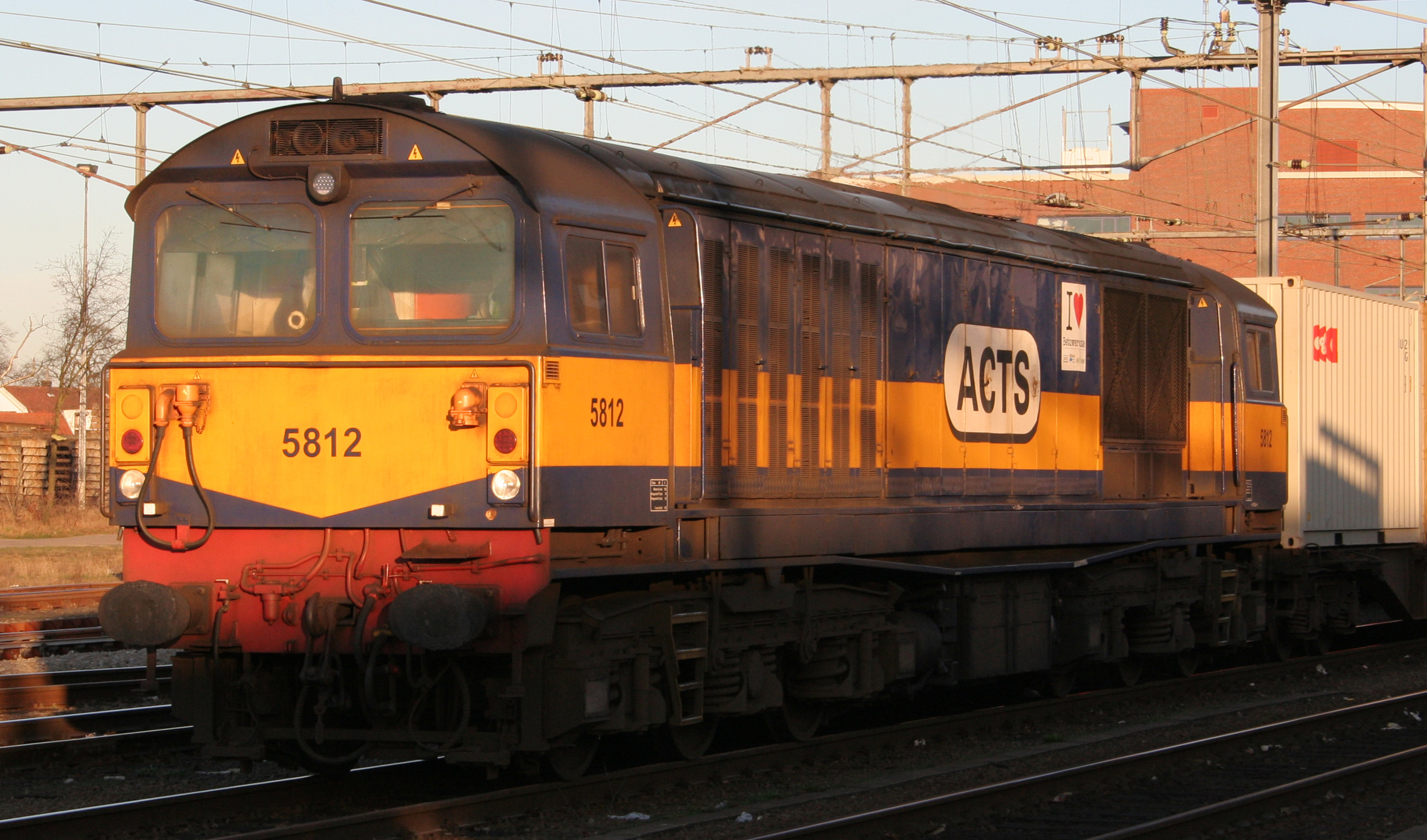
ACTS 5812 in the Netherlands (2008)

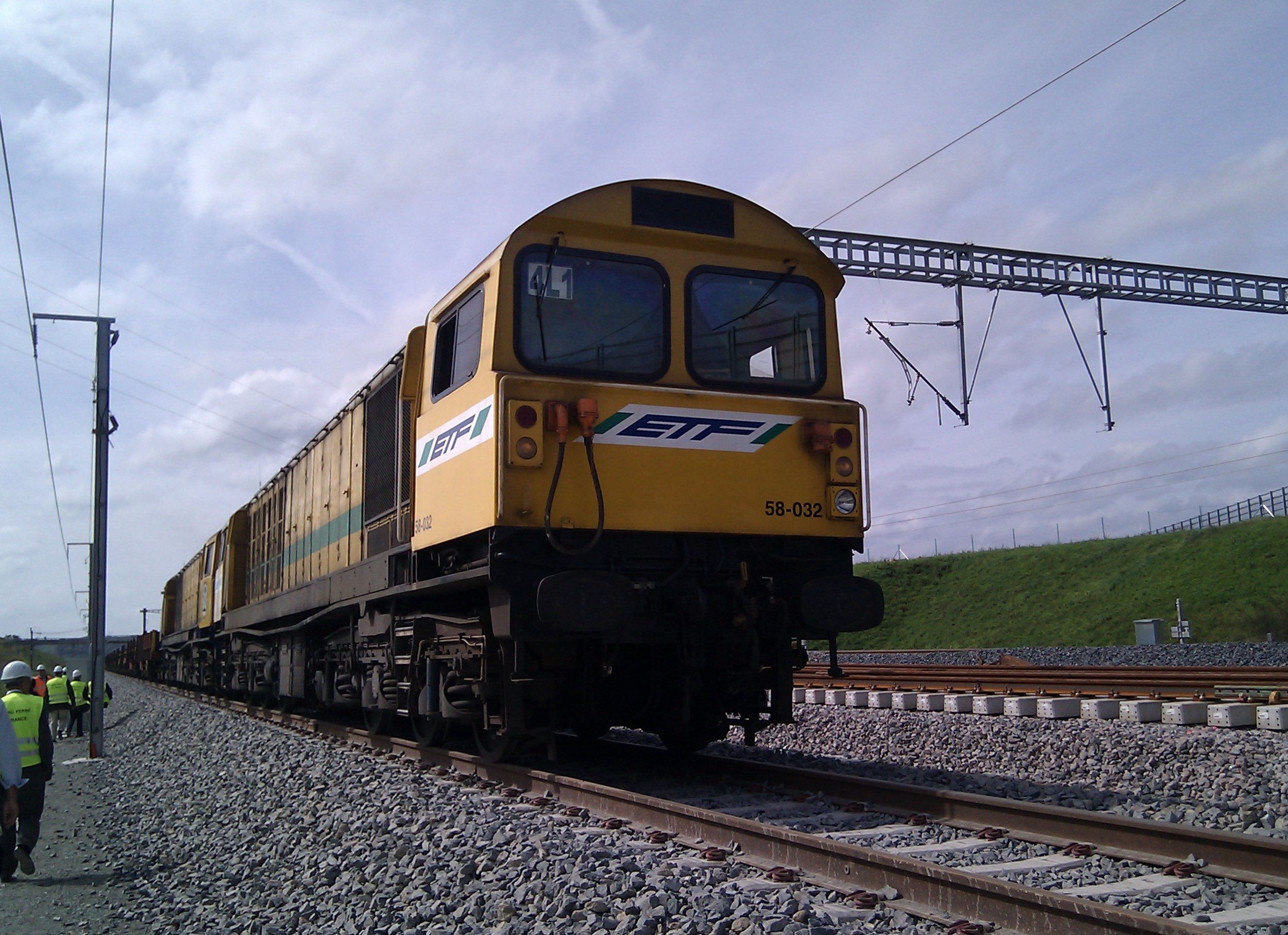
LGV Rhin-Rhône construction train in France (2010)

== Models ==
In 1979, prior to the building of the first locomotive by British Rail Engineering Limited, a 1:25 scale model was made by a member of the staff of the Locomotive Drawing Office at the Railway Technical Centre (RTC) in Derby, using the General Arrangement drawings of the proposed design. The model formed part of an exhibition at the RTC to illustrate the work of the Locomotive Design Office to the then Chairman of British Rail, Sir Peter Parker. In 1982 Hornby Railways released a OO gauge model of a Class 58, with variants produced over the next two decades. Heljan released a OO gauge model in 2008. In 2011 Dapol released a model in British N gauge.
