= NS Class 1300 =

Class of Dutch electric locomotives

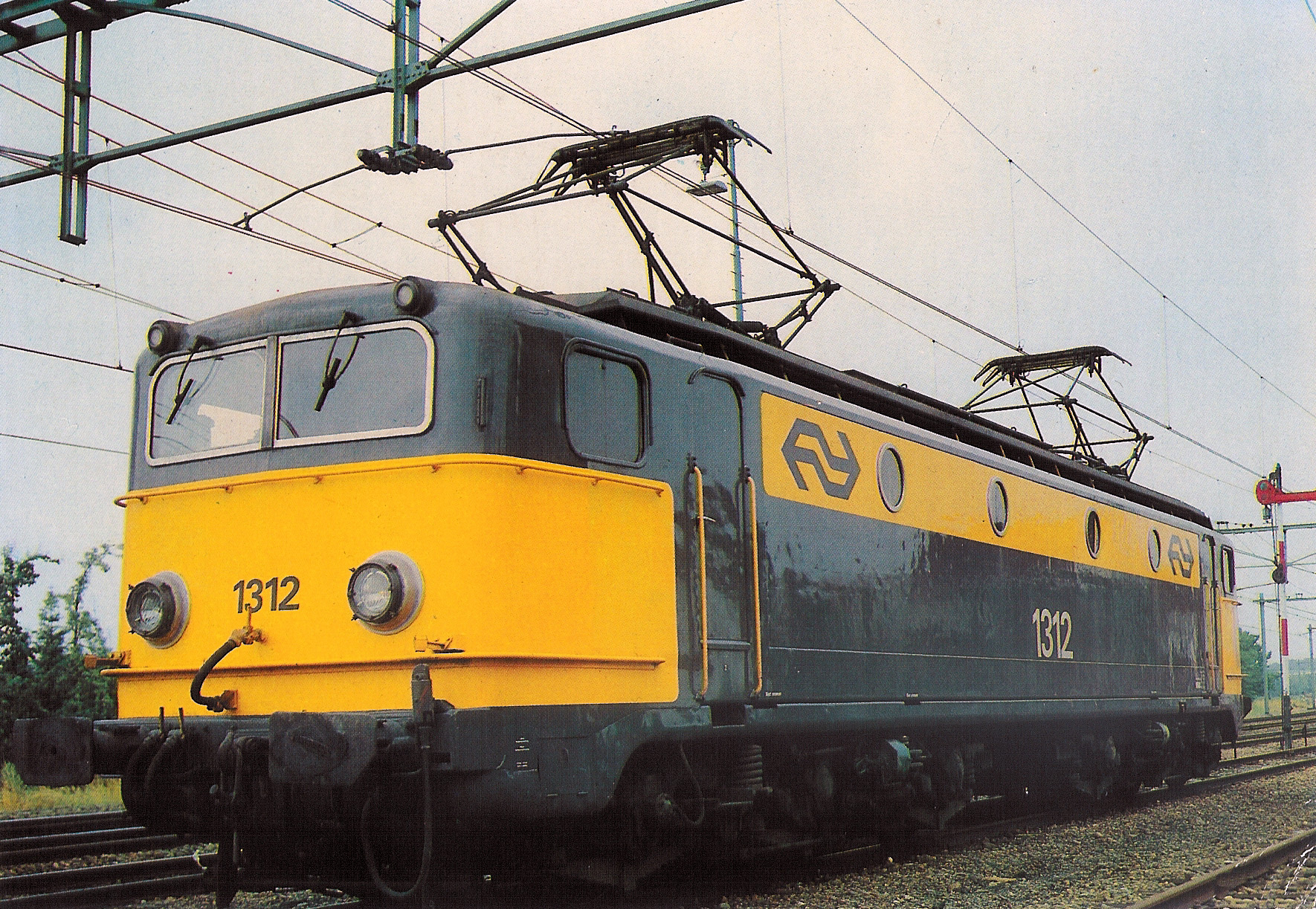
Type and origin
- Power type: Electric
- Builder: Alstom
- Build date: 1952-1956
- Total produced: 16
Specifications
- Configuration
  - UIC: Co-Co
- Gauge: 1,435 mm (4 ft 8 1/2 in)
- Length: 18.95 m (62 ft 2 in)
- Adhesive weight: 19 t (18.7 long tons; 20.9 short tons)
- Loco weight: 111 t (109 long tons; 122 short tons)
- Electric system/s: 1.5 kV DC Catenary
- Current pickup: Pantograph
- Safety systems: ATB-EG
Performance figures
- Maximum speed: 130 km/h (81 mph)
- Power output: 3,159 kW (4,236 hp)
- Tractive effort: 241 kN (54,000 lb_{f})
Career
- Operators: Nederlandse Spoorwegen
- Class: 1300
- Number in class: 16
- Numbers: In the range 1301-1316
- Delivered: 1952-1956
- Retired: 2000
- Scrapped: 2000/2001

The Class 1200 was a class of electric locomotives operated by Nederlandse Spoorwegen in The Netherlands. It was built at the same time as the NS Class 1100 at Alstom and was based on the SNCF Class CC 7100. The Class 1300 is a bigger 6-axle, Co-Co, version of the Class 1100.

The first was delivered in 1952 and was first used at the opening of the electric service between Zwolle and Groningen.

After being in service for less than a year 1303 was damaged beyond repair when it collided with EMU 642 at Weesp on 19 June 1953. After this accident Alstom delivered a new loco that was originally to be delivered as a CC 7100 to the SNCF. 1303 was scrapped on the spot although some equipment was salvaged to be used in replacement loco 1311.

The locos numbered 1312-1316 were delivered in 1956 in a Berlin blue colour scheme (the locos delivered in 1952 were delivered in a turquoise colour scheme, but were painted Berlin blue in 1955).

During the 1980s the entire Class 1300 got prolonging maintenance and were painted yellow, with a big NS logo at the side. Also, the locos were all named after a Dutch city:

- 1301 Dieren
- 1302 Woerden
- 1304 Culemborg
- 1305 Alphen aan den Rijn
- 1306 Brummen
- 1307 Etten-Leur
- 1308 Nunspeet
- 1309 Susteren
- 1310 Bussum
- 1311 Best
- 1312 Zoetermeer
- 1313 Uitgeest
- 1314 Hoorn
- 1315 Tiel
- 1316 Geldermalsen

In 2000 the last locomotives were withdrawn from service. 1302, 1304, 1312 and 1315 have been preserved.

In 2015 number 1304 was returned to service by private operator HSL Logistik, but in February 2016 it broke down due to operator error. Late 2018 it was repaired by replacing a few traction motors and since then it is deployed by the Fairtrains foundation for occasional transfers. The objective of Fairtrains is to have museum equipment restored and preserved from the revenues of their use. Number 1315 is the next one to be refurbished and is expected to be operational again in the course of 2019.

Number 1312 is the working representative of this class for the Dutch Railway Museum, with number 1302 serving as spare part donor.
