= HSL Logistik =

HSL Logistik GmbH
- Industry: Rail
- Founded: 2003
- Headquarters: Hamburg, Germany
- Services: Freight transportation
- Subsidiaries: HSL Logisik BV
- Website: hsl-logistik.de

HSL Logistik GmbH. is a privately owned German train-operating company based in Hamburg, Germany.

== History ==
HSL Logistik was founded in 2003 as a private company offering trained staff to rail operators. In 2004 the company received a license to operate freight and passenger trains from the German Federal Railway Authority.

In 2010 Haiko Boettcher took over management of the company, having become a shareholder in 2007. Also in 2010 the company was awarded a license to operate trains in the Netherlands, and acquired and merged with Hamburg-based rail operator Rent a Train GmbH. In 2011 Haiko Boettcher became the 100% shareholder of the company.

== Operations and services ==
HSL Logistik provides shunting services at terminals and ports in Bremen, Hamburg, Rostock and Seelze (Hanover), transportation by train, including path ordering, spot hire and one-off locomotive hire.

HSL also operates traffic in neighboring European countries, namely the Netherlands, Austria, Poland and the Czech Republic. HSL Logistik GmbH is represented by independent subsidiaries in each of these countries.

Starting early 2017, HSL operated cargo services in Belgium through its Polish subsidiary HSL Polska, but eventually a Belgian subsidiary was set up for these services.

== Safety issues ==
On 12 April 2017, the Dutch Railway Authority revoked the company's operations license with immediate effect due to significant safety problems within the organization. It was the first time the authority had revoked such a licence.

== Fleet ==
The company operates using the locomotives below. They used to operate with Vossloh G2000 diesel locomotives for mainline work, but these have now been returned. and diesel and electric Prima types.

Class	Image	Type	Top speed		Number	Builder	Built
Class	Image	Type	km/h	mph	Number	Builder	Built
V 60		Diesel locomotive	60	37	2	Henschel	1960, 1983
V 90		Diesel locomotive	80	50	1	MaK	1968
285		Diesel locomotive	140	87	3	Bombardier	2007-2008
1200		Electric locomotive	135	84	1	Werkspoor	1952
1300		Electric locomotive	130	81	2	Alstom	1952-1956
151		Electric locomotive	120	75	3	AEG, BBC, Henschel, Krauss-Maffei, Krupp, Siemens	1972-1978
1800		Electric locomotive	140	87	1	Alstom	1981-1983
Prima		Electric locomotive	140	87	1	Alstom	2004
185		Electric locomotive	140	87	1	Bombardier	2009
186		Electric locomotive	140	87	2	Bombardier	2007-2008
