= Railway Museum (Netherlands) =

- Het Spoorwegmuseum
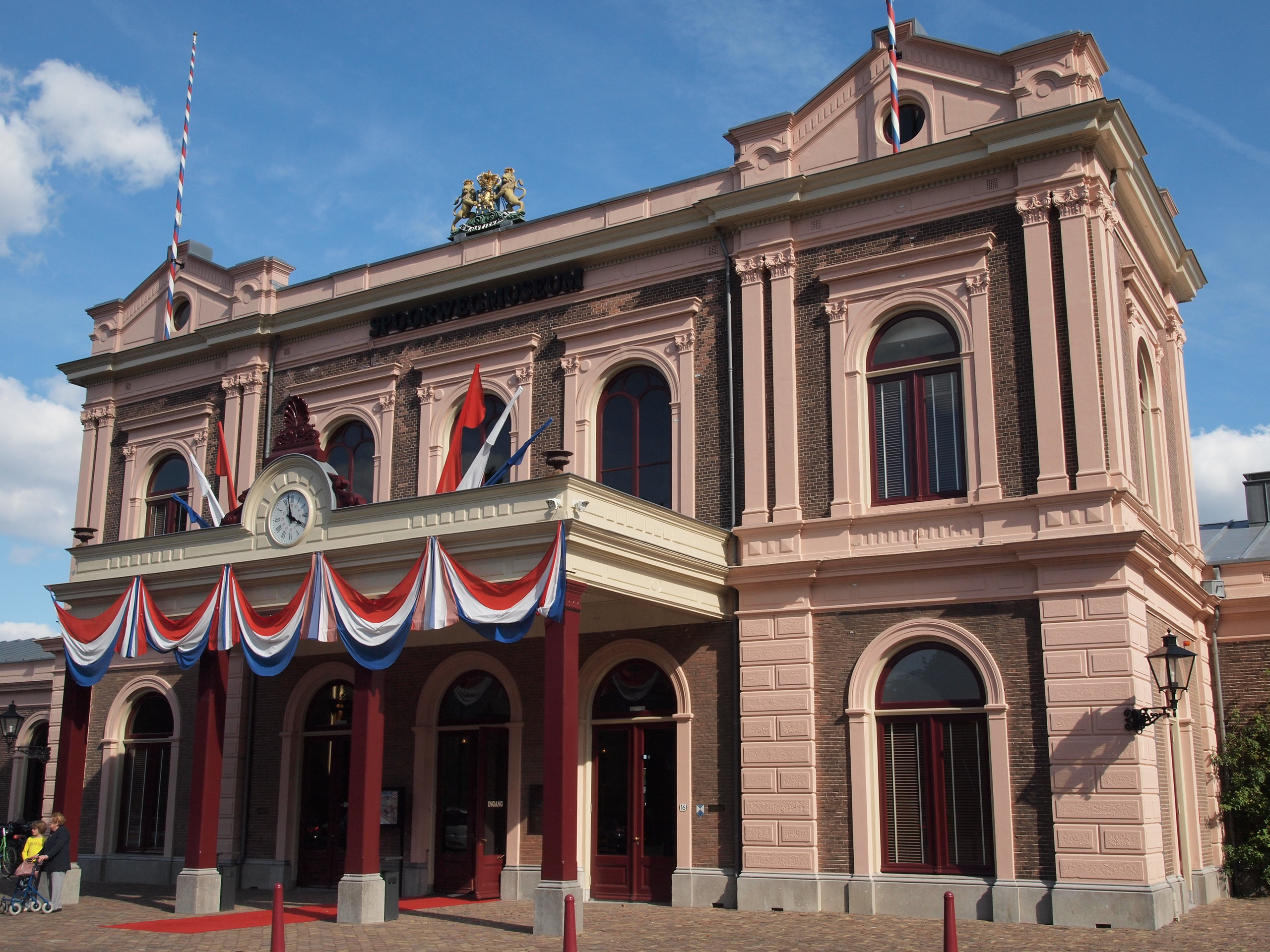
- Railway Museum in 2010

- Location of the museum in Utrecht in the Netherlands
- Established: 1927; 99 years ago
- Location: Utrecht, Netherlands
- Coordinates: 52.0880°N 5.1312°E
- Type: Transport museum
- Visitors: 355,000 (2012 est.); Ranking 10th nationally (2013)
- Directors: Nicole Kuppens, a.i.
- Website: www.spoorwegmuseum.nl

The Railway Museum (Dutch: Het Spoorwegmuseum) in Utrecht is the Dutch national railway museum. It was established in 1927 and since 1954 has been housed in the former Maliebaan station.

== History ==
The museum was established in 1927 and was initially located in one of the main buildings of the Nederlandse Spoorwegen (NS, Dutch Railways) in Utrecht. At that time, the collection consisted mostly of pictures, documents, and small objects. In the 1930s the first steps were taken to conserve old historically significant rail equipment. A portion of this collection was lost during World War II.

== Maliebaan station ==
The collection was briefly located in the Rijksmuseum in Amsterdam, but in the 1950s the museum was moved back to Utrecht. Maliebaan station, which had been closed in 1939, was found to be a suitable site. The building was remodeled, and in 1954 the museum reopened there. In this location there was far more room to exhibit the entire collection to the public, including historical rail equipment. Until 2003, a long line of historic steam locomotives on track one of the station was one of the most distinctive aspects of the exhibit.

== Expansion and renovation ==
Over the years, more rolling stock and trams were added to the museum, and in the 1960s the plaza in front of the building was filled with rolling stock, which suffered much from the weather. An initial improvement, in 1975, was the construction of a roofed platform behind the building. In 1977 the museum was expanded with a pedestrian bridge, allowing access to an exhibit area on the other side of the freight rail tracks behind the main building. The space in front of the building was then converted to a parking lot.

The right wing of the main building contained the "historic" department, with the "modern" department located in the left wing. Among the distinctive parts of the collection are models of bridges from early on in the development of the Dutch railways, and models of various train types. In addition there are paintings, prints, and railway equipment to be seen. The "modern" section was changed in the 1980s when it was updated to include the most recent developments, including the front of a "Sprinter" train.

Between 1988 and 1989 a major renovation was undertaken. The interior of the station building was completely redone according to the modern views of that time. This version was in place through 2003. In addition, the back lot was integrated into the museum and a "railway landscape" was built there. It also became possible to take rides, both in model trains and full sized ones. Additional buildings were added, such as the signal box from Hoogezand-Sappemeer, and a crossing guard house from Elst (in the province of Gelderland). One of the oldest railway bridges, from Halfweg, was also included. Finally, rail service between the main railway station of Utrecht and the Maliebaan station (the museum) was established by the NS.

Later additions, in the 1990s, were two warehouses, one of which now houses a restaurant, and a new building on the back lot with a large model railway. The growing collection of rolling stock was largely restored, and partly returned to operating condition. Some of the trains had suffered due to being stored out in the open, so there has been an ongoing effort to have the entire exhibit area roofed over.

== 2003 remodeling ==
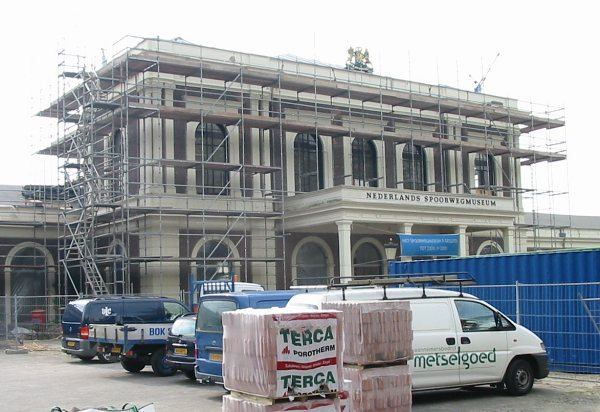
Remodeling of the Nederlands Spoorwegmuseum in Utrecht, 2004

In 2002 a decision was made to do yet another major remodeling of the museum. The station building was closed in September 2003, gutted, and then largely restored to the way it looked in the 19th century, with the addition of the "Royal waiting room" moved there from the "Staatsspoor" railway station of The Hague, which was demolished in 1973.

=== Sections of the station building ===
- Station hall
- Freight hall
- Dining room
- Waiting room, 3rd class
- Waiting room, 1st and 2nd class
- Royal waiting room

== The new building ==
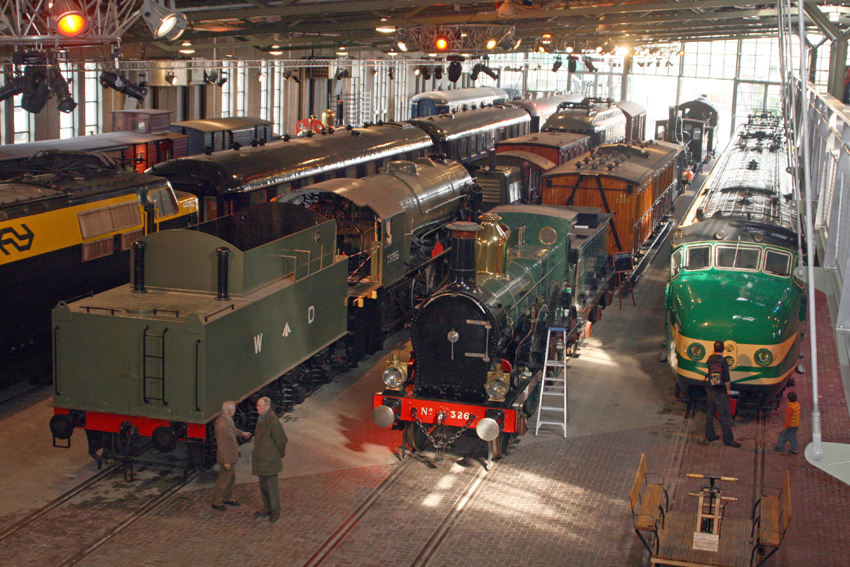
Interior of the main train shed

During the 2002 remodeling, the back lot was also largely cleared, and completely renovated. A large new museum building was constructed, which now contains four "worlds":

1. The great discovery (the early years in the 19th century)
2. Dream travels (the glory days of international trains around 1900)
3. Steel monsters (the 1930s and 1940s)
4. The workshop (large hall with trains)

In April 2010, the 5th anniversary of the re-opening was marked by a special exhibition of royal trains, called “Royal Class, Royal Railways”, opened by Queen Beatrix.

=== Sections of the new building ===
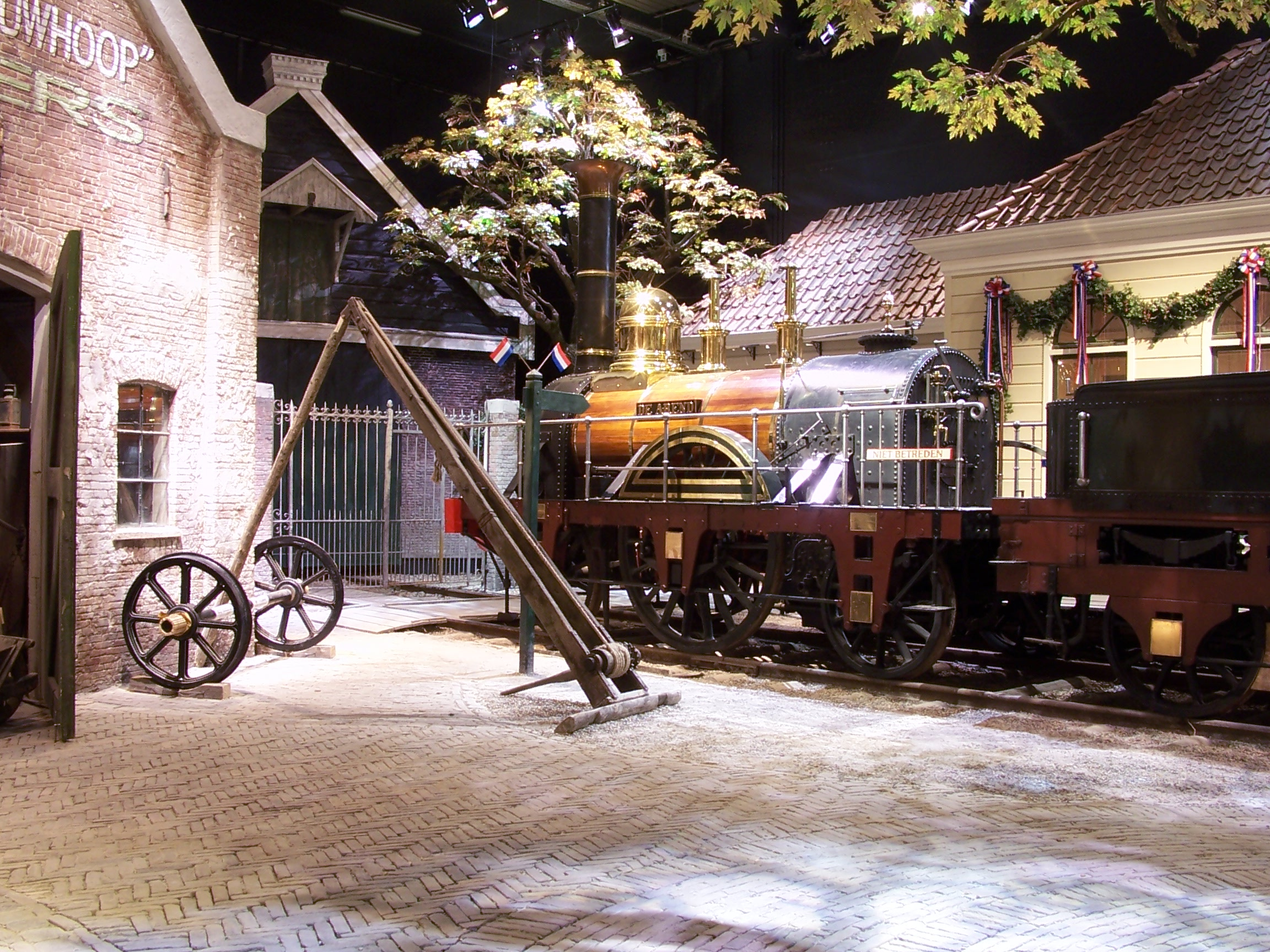
Section "The Great Discovery".

- Conference hall and foyer
- The Open Depots
- Automated Audio Tour "World 1"
- Theater "World 2"
- Track "World 3"
- Plaza "World 4"
- Simulation "World 5"
- Warehouse "Nijverdal"
- Model Trains Cellar
- Exhibition Area
- Museum Shop
- Restaurant

=== Outdoors exhibit area ===
On the exhibit area outside, a water tower was added near the existing signal box. There is also a model railway, a children's playground, and an area for special events, as well as a turntable.

== Rolling stock collection ==
The museum currently owns a large and varied collection of rolling stock. The collection is too large to be shown in full in the limited space available. For this reason, most of the trams were dropped from the collection in the 1990s, and some of the trains are in storage. The remaining collection is no longer shown by category, as was formerly the practice, but is placed more or less at random.

The collection currently on display contains, among other things, steam locomotives, electric locomotives, diesel locomotives, train cars, freight cars, and some trams.

=== Steam ===
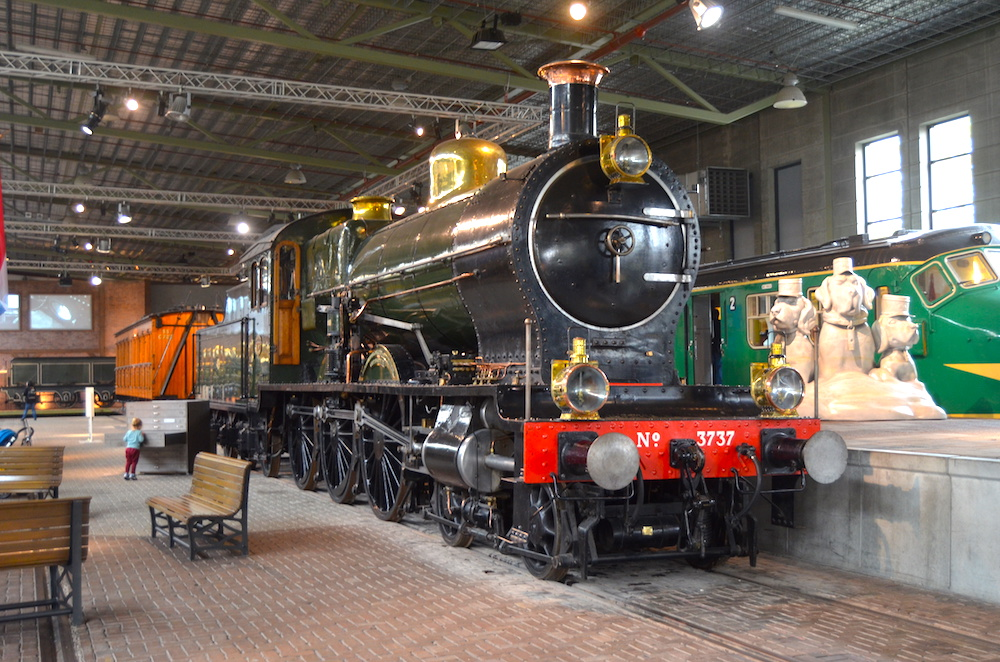
NS 3737, the last steam locomotive in service

- De Arend (1839) - Replica built in 1939
- NS 700 No. 705 (No. 13) - Built in 1864
- NS 1000 No. 89 Nestor - Built in 1880
- NS 1300 No. 326 - Built in 1881
- NS 1600 No. 107 - Built in 1889
- NS 3700 No. 3737 - Built in 1911
- NS 2100 No. 2104 - Built in 1914
- Indonesian Railways CC50 class No. 22 "The Monster" - Built in 1928, The largest locomotive in the collection.
- NS 6300 No. 6317 - Built in 1931
- WD Austerity 2-10-0 73755 Longmoor - Built in 1945

=== Diesel ===
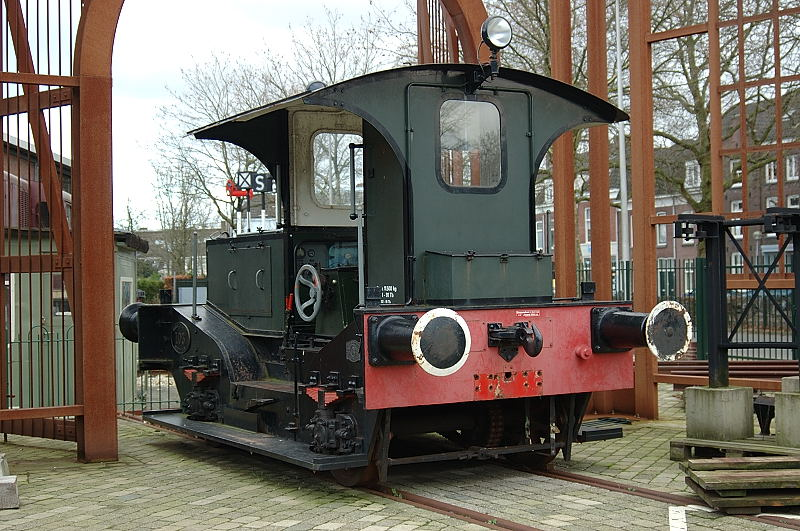
NSM 103

- Oersik 103 - Built in 1930
- Oersik 137 - Built in 1932
- NS Class 200 No. 311 - Built in 1940
- NS Class 200 No. 345 - Built in 1945
- NS Class 200 No. 362 - Built in 1951
- Hippel Bakkie NS508 - Built in 1944
- Hippel Bakkie NS512 - Built in 1945
- NS Class 600 No. 605 - Built in 1955
- NS Class 600 No. 629 - Built in 1956
- NS 2200 No. 2215 - Built in 1955
- NS 2200 No. 2264 - Built in 1956
- NS 2400 No. 2498 - Built in 1956

=== Electric ===
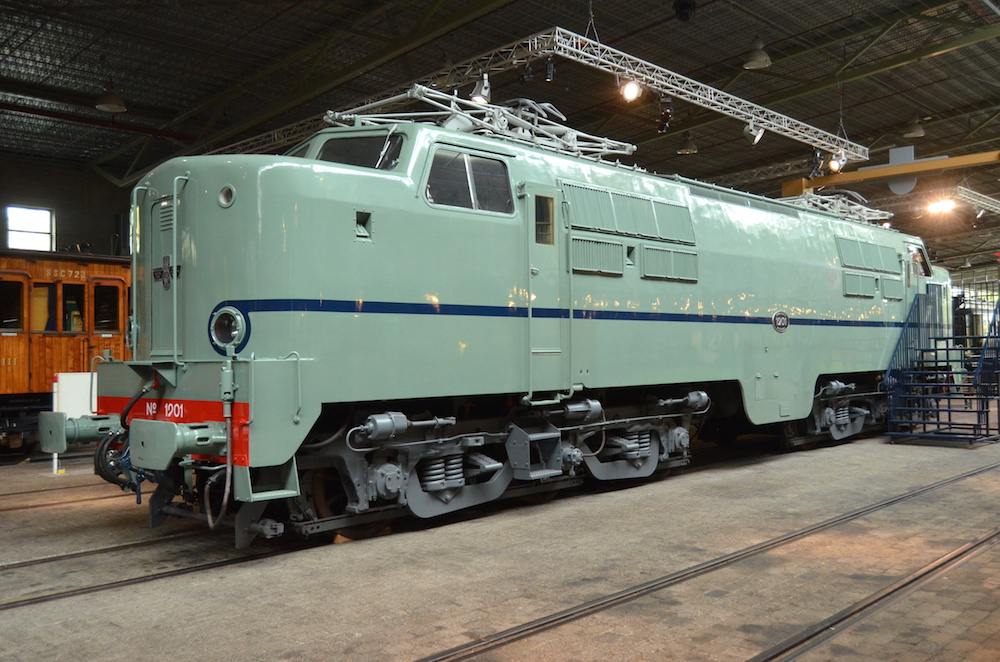
Nederlands Spoorwegmuseum loc NS 1201

- NS Class 1000 No. 1010 - Built in 1949
- NS Class 1100 No. 1122 - Built in 1951
- NS Class 1100 No. 1125 - Built in 1955
- NS Class 1200 No. 1201 - Built in 1951 (on loan)
- NS Class 1200 No. 1202 - Built in 1951
- NS Class 1200 No. 1211 - Built in 1952
- NS Class 1300 No. 1302 - Built in 1952
- NS Class 1300 No. 1312 - Built in 1956
- NS Class 1500 No. 1501 Diana - Built in 1954
- NS Class 1600 No. 1656 - Built in 1983
- NS Class 1700 No. 1768 - Built in 1993

=== DMUs ===
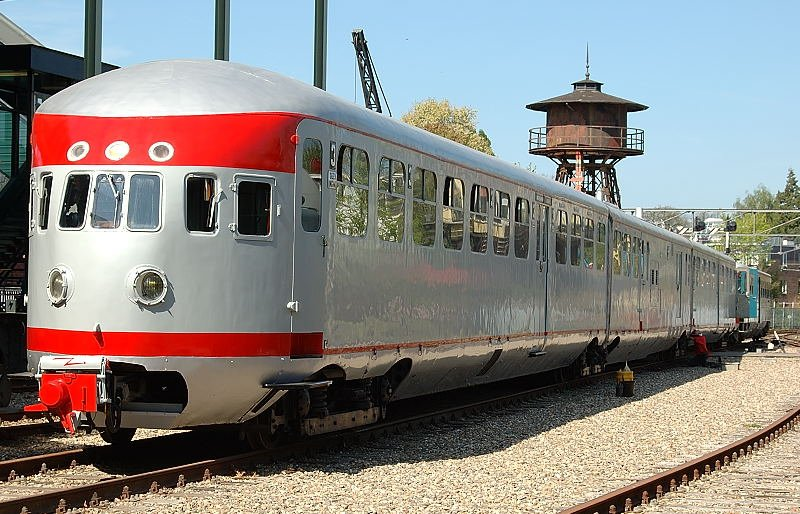
Mat '34 No 27

- Mat '34 DE3 No. 27 - Built in 1934
- DE-1 NS 20 De Kameel - Built in 1954
- DE-2 (Plan X) NS 41 - Built in 1954
- DE 3 (Plan U) No. 114 - Built in 1960
- DM90 No. 3426 - Built in 1997

=== EMUs ===
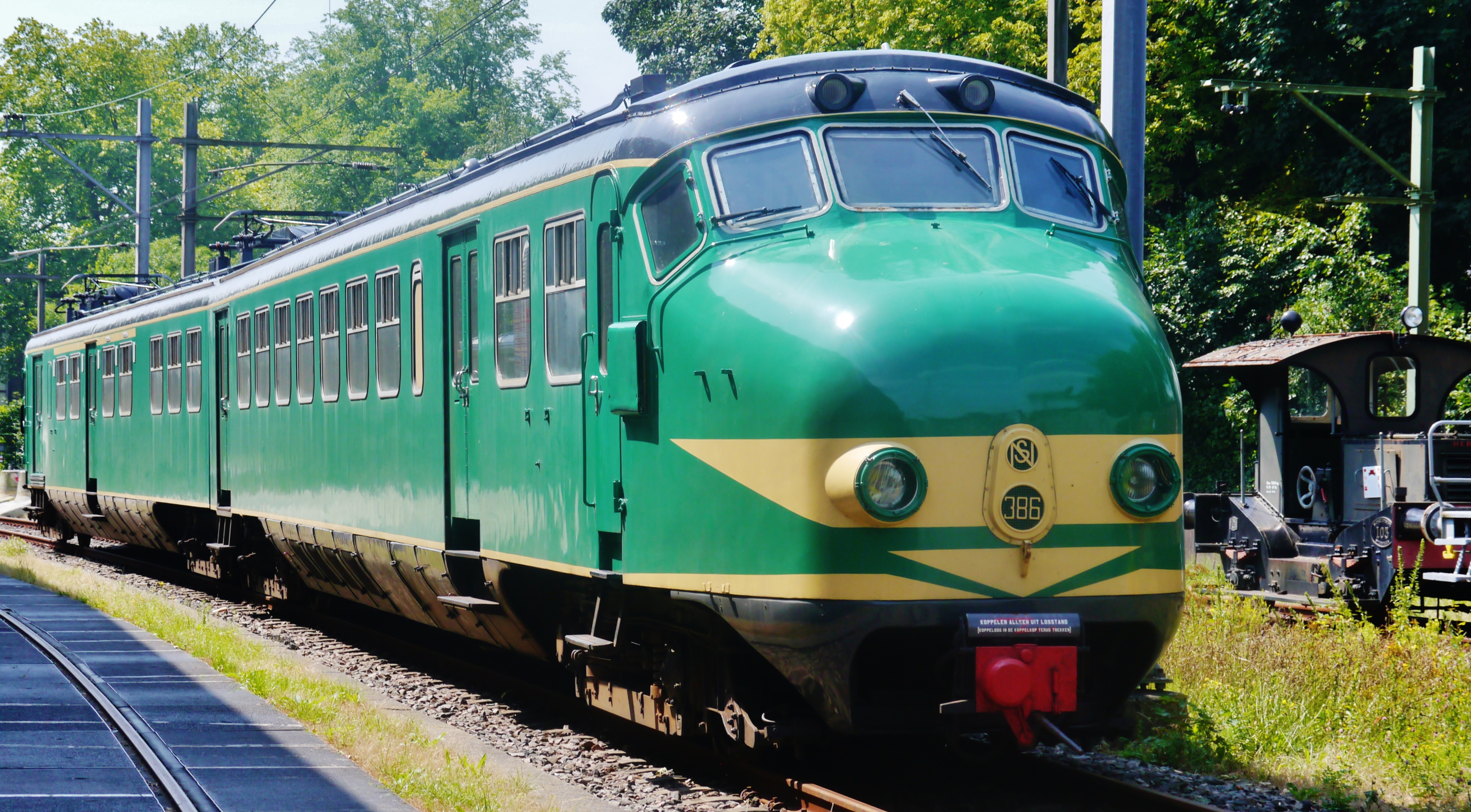
Mat '54 No 386

- ZHESM 6 - Built in 1908
- Mat '24 - Built in 1927
- Mat '36 No. 252 - Built in 1938
- Mat '46 (Plan C) No. 273 - Built in 1952
- Mat '54 (Plan Q) No. 386 - Built in 1962
- Mat '64 (Plan V) No. 876 - Built in 1972
- SGM (Plan Y) No. 2133 - Built in 1979
- ICM (Plan Z) No. 4011 - Built in 1983

=== Passenger cars ===
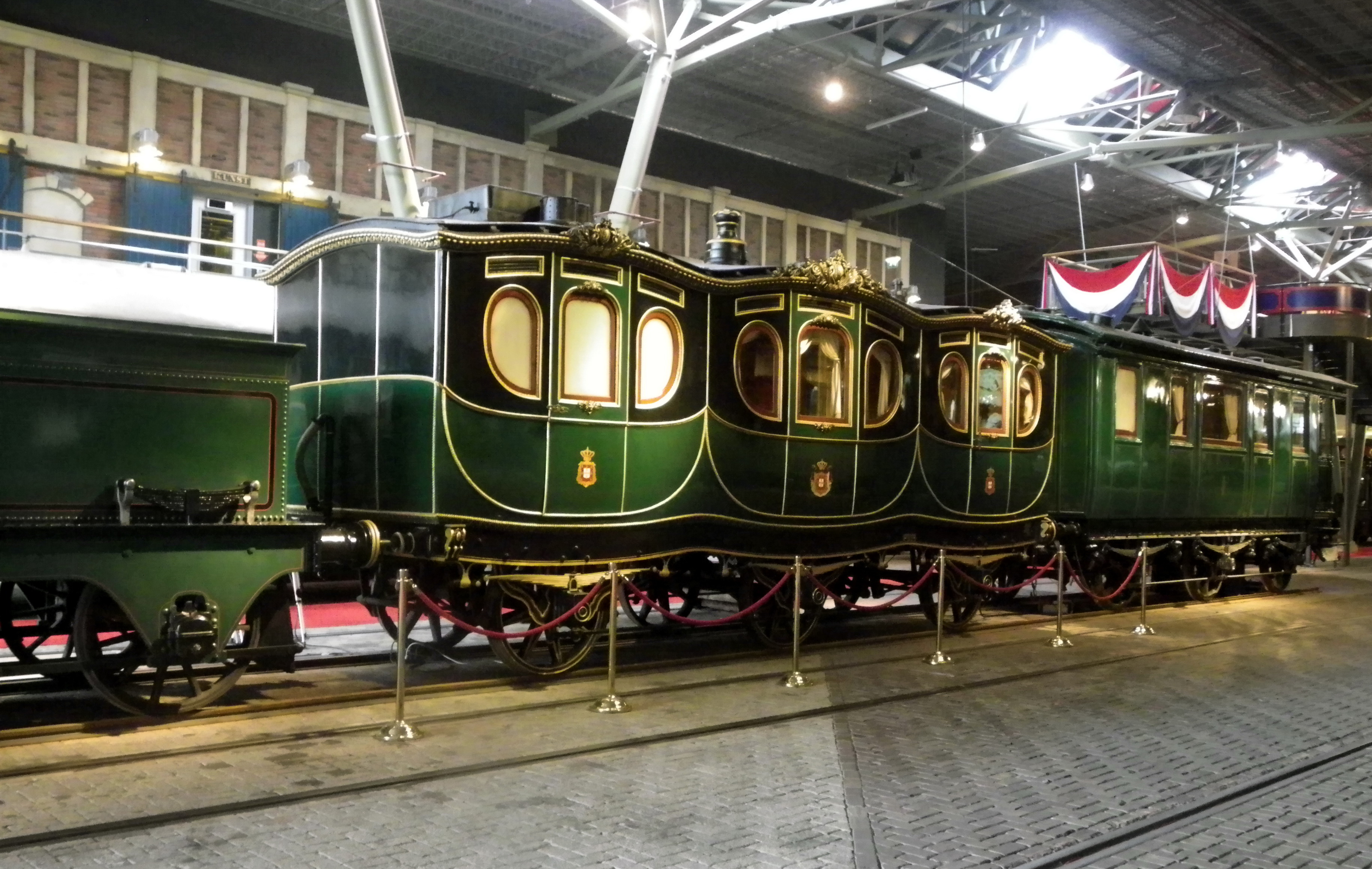
Early carriages

- Arend Wagons HIJSM 4, 8 & 10 - Built in 1839
- Saloon coach 1 - Built in 1864
- Koekblik SSC218 - Built in 1874
- NCS B 119 - Built in 1904
- HSM C 755 - Built in 1907
- Wooden carriage SSC723 - Built in 1910
- Oriënt Express WR2287 - Built in 1911
- Salon Rijtuig 8&9 - Built in 1932
- Blauwe Roemeen WR4249 - Built in 1943
- Plan D - NS AB 7709 - Built in 1950
- Plan D - NS RD 7659 - Built in 1951
- Plan E - NS CKD6910 - Built in 1955
- Plan E - NS C6703 - Built in 1956
- Plan K - NS AB7376 - Built in 1958
- Slaaprijtuig CIWL4750 - Built in 1964
- Plan W - NS B4118 - Built in 1966
- DDM-1 - NS Bvk 6908 - Built in 1985
- DDM-1 - NS ABv 6618 - Built in 1985
- ICR - NS Bs 28 101 - Built in 1986
- DD-AR - NS ABv 7576 - Built in 1993

=== Trams ===
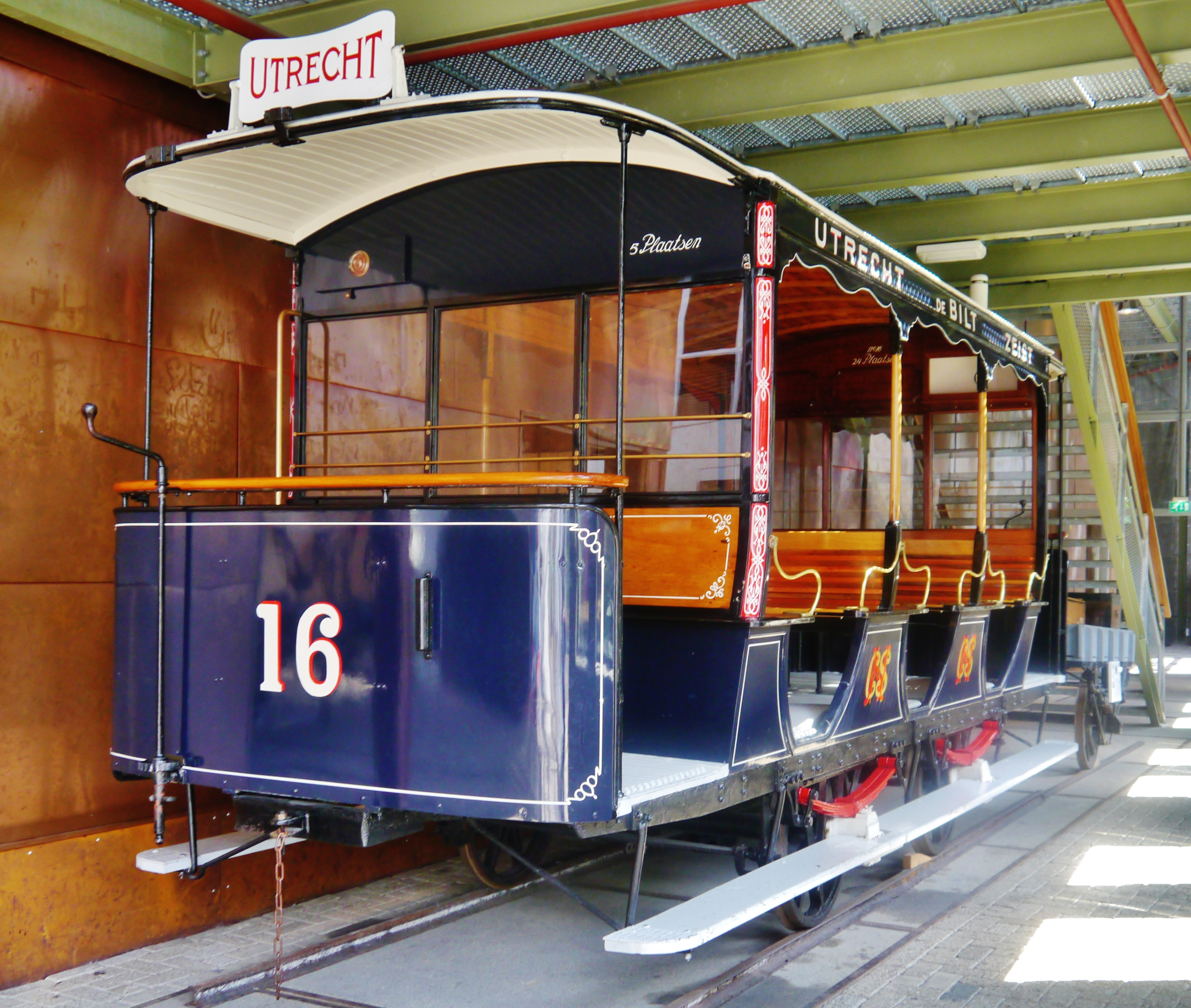
Utrecht horse-drawn tram STM 16

- RSTM 2 - Built in 1881
- Horse-drawn tram STM 16 - Built in 1891

=== Freight cars ===
The museum has a diverse selection of freight vehicles.

== Shuttle rail service between Utrecht central station and the Maliebaan station ==
As part of the reopening of the renovated museum in June 2005, Utrecht Maliebaan railway station was also reopened as a normal railway station for the first time in almost 66 years. There is now train service on an hourly basis on days when the museum is open, between the museum and Utrecht Centraal railway station, with a stop at Utrecht Overvecht railway station.

Preceding station	Nederlandse Spoorwegen	Following station
Utrecht Overvecht towards Utrecht Centraal	NS Sprinter 28300	Terminus

== See also ==
- Dual gauge
- Nederlandse Spoorwegen
- Rail transport
- Rail transport in the Netherlands
