= NS Class 1200 =

Dutch electric locomotive class

Nederlandse Spoorwegen Class 1200
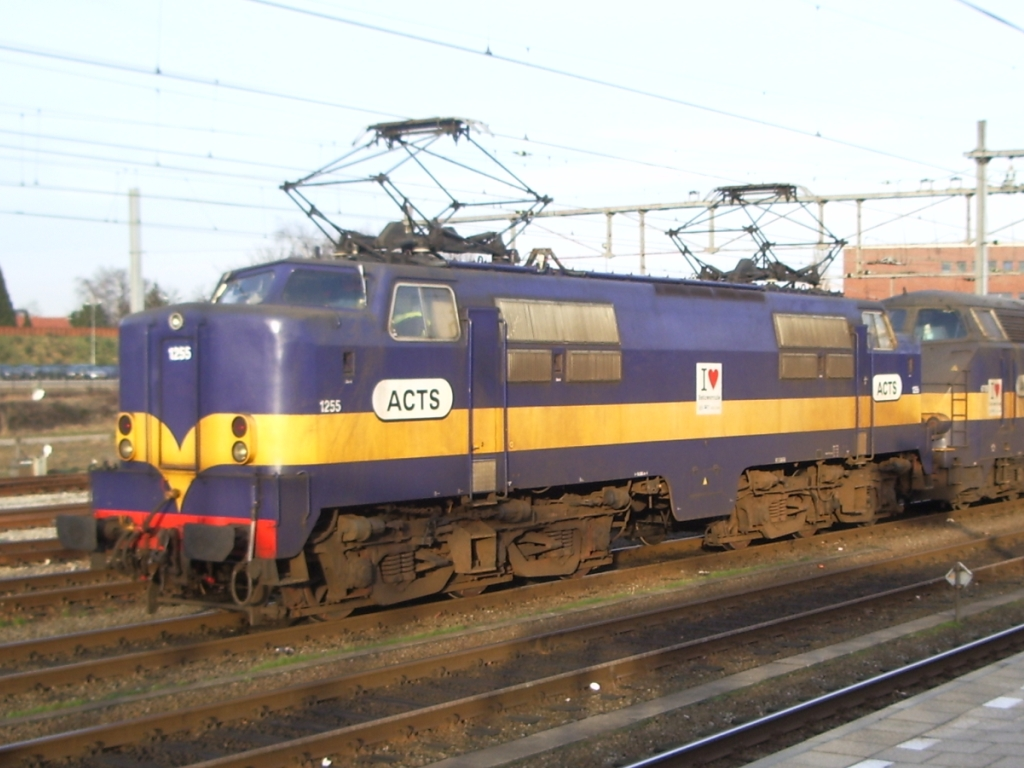
- ACTS 1255 at Amersfoort station in February 2007
Type and origin
- Power type: Electric
- Builder: Werkspoor (mech.); Heemaf (elec.) after design from Baldwin and Westinghouse
- Build date: 1951-1953
- Total produced: 25
Specifications
- Configuration
  - UIC: Co-Co
- Gauge: 1,435 mm (4 ft 8 1/2 in)
- Length: 18.09 m (59 ft 4.2 in)
- Axle load: 18 t (17.7 long tons; 19.8 short tons)
- Adhesive weight: Full weight
- Loco weight: 108 t (106 long tons; 119 short tons)
- Electric system/s: 1.5 kV DC Catenary
- Current pickup: Pantograph
- Safety systems: ATB-EG (since 1964)
Performance figures
- Maximum speed: 150 km/h (93 mph) (135 km/h or 84 mph in service)
- Power output: 2,220 kW (2,980 hp)
- Tractive effort: 195 kN (44,000 lb_{f})
Career
- Operators: Nederlandse Spoorwegen, ACTS, Euro-Express-Treincharter BV (EETC)
- Class: 1200
- Number in class: 25
- Numbers: Nederlandse Spoorwegen: 1201-1225; ACTS 1251-1255
- Delivered: 1951–1953
- Retired: 1998
- Scrapped: 1999
- Current owner: EETC
- Disposition: 8 preserved, 17 scrapped

The Class 1200 was a class of electric locomotives operated by Nederlandse Spoorwegen in The Netherlands.

== History ==
=== Nederlandse Spoorwegen ===
The Class 1200 was designed by Baldwin and built by Werkspoor in Utrecht between 1951 and 1953. The electrical equipment was built by N.V. Heemaf in Hengelo to a design by Westinghouse. Some parts (the bogies, and the electrical installation) were made in the United States as part of the Marshall Plan.

Originally 75 locomotives were ordered, but the order was reduced to 25 and more locomotives of the French Class 1100 locomotives were ordered instead. In the late 1970, the class underwent life extension work.

The 1200 class was retired by the NS in 1998. Locomotives 1201, 1202 and 1211 were obtained for preservation by the Stichting Klassieke Locomotieven group (1201) and the Railway Museum (1202 and 1211).

=== ACTS Nederland ===
Five locomotives, 1214, 1215, 1218, 1221 and 1225, were sold to Dutch freight operator ACTS Nederland in 1999 and were renumbered to 1251–1255. ACTS Nederland continued to use its five 1200 class locomotives in freight and charter service until 2010. Locomotive 1253 was taken out of service in 2003 and was used as a parts donor, while 1252 was taken out of service in 2007. The remaining three locomotives were withdrawn in 2009-10 by ACTS and all except parts donor 1253 were sold to Euro-Express-Treincharter (EETC).

As of January 2011 engines 1251 and 1252 had been returned to working order by EETC whilst engine 1254 was being overhauled. The two operational locomotives were being used to haul the empty Citynightline train from Munich and Zurich and EuroNight Jan Kiepura train from Moscow, Minsk, Warsaw, Prague and Copenhagen between Amsterdam Centraal railway station and Watergraafsmeer. They are also used on charter trains and transporting carriages to and from the EETC workshop in Rotterdam.

=== Sixty years of the 1200 class ===
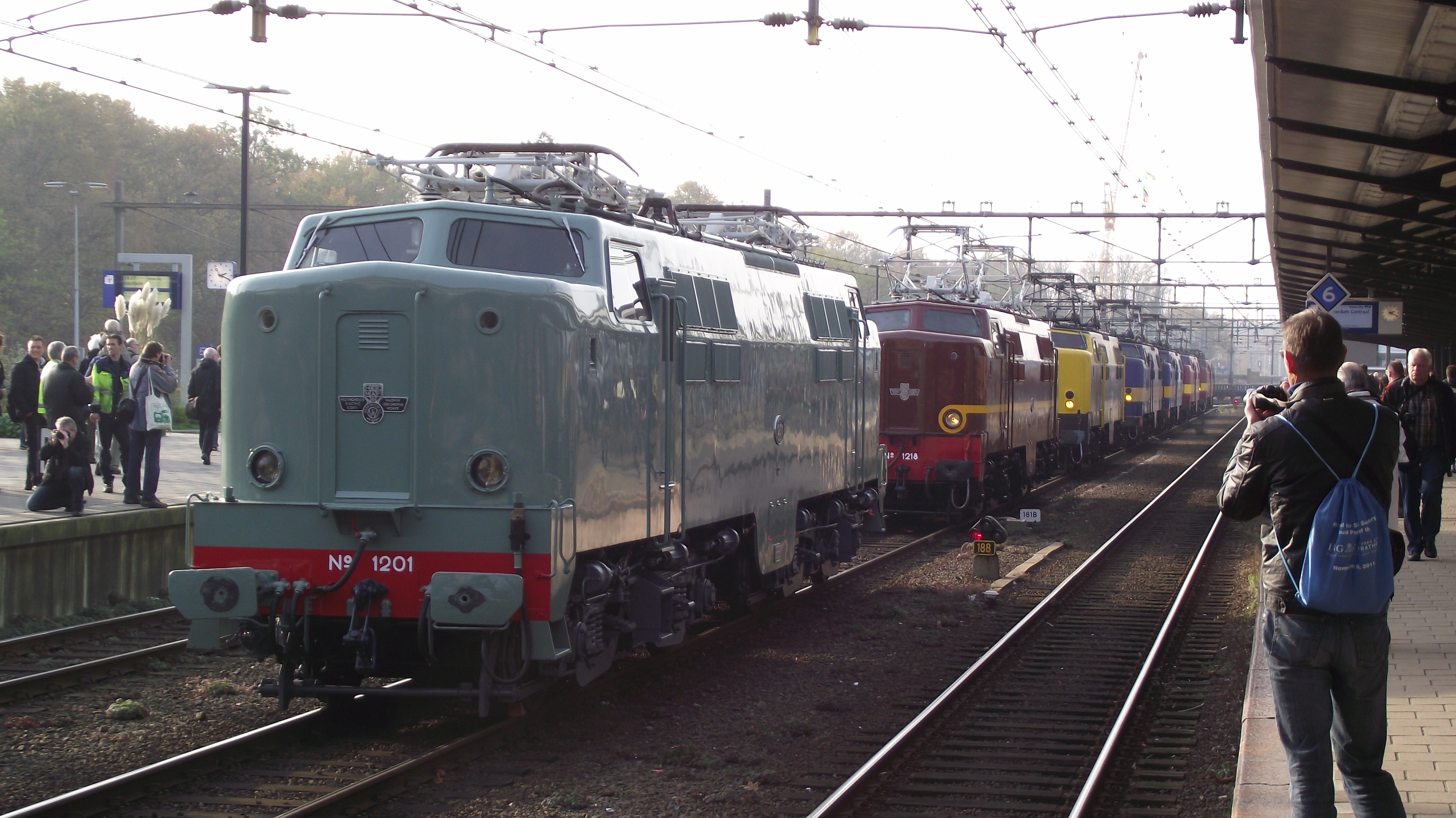
The eight surviving 1200s at Amersfoort station in November 2011

On 12 November 2011, all eight existing engines were brought together at Amersfoort station for a railway enthusiast event to celebrate 60 years since the 1200 class entered service. The display was organized by the NVBS (Nederlandse Vereniging van Belangstellenden in het Spoor- en tramwegwezen), the Dutch national railway enthusiasts' body which was celebrating its 80th anniversary.

== Märklin-Edition ==
In 2014 locomotive 1252 was repainted to celebrate 175 years of railways in the Netherlands. As part of this, the locomotive was decorated with a promotional slogan by Märklin "The original must be Märklin - Märklin congratulates the Netherlands on 175 years of railways" in Dutch on one side of the locomotive body and German on the other. The locomotive was offered as a one-time series HO scale model by Märklin as item No. 37128 in 2014.

== Fairtrains ==
Since 2017 all engines were decommissioned by their respective owners, but the Fairtrains foundation made number 1251 operational again in 2018 for being hired by the Railexperts company. The objective of Fairtrains is to have museum equipment restored and preserved from the revenues of their use. In case of sufficient interest, some more machines of this class are kept behind for refurbishment.
