= Husa Transportation Group =

Group of transportation/logistics companies

HUSA transportation group
- Industry: Rail freight transportation, Intermodal logistics
- Founded: 1989 ACTS; 1998 Husa Transportation group
- Headquarters: ATCS : 's-Hertogenbosch; Husa : Oisterwijk, Netherlands
- Key people: CEO of ACTS, (1989-2004) : Ir John Hoekwater; CEO of Husa Group, (2004-) : Rob van Gansewinkel
- Divisions: Husa Railway Services; Husa Logistic Services; Husa Rolling Stock Services
- Subsidiaries: ACTS Nederland BV; IMS-Veendam (formerly De Vries transport group); Rent-a-rail GmbH; RailMotion AG; The Rail Factory BV
- Website: https://www.husa-logistics.nl

Husa Transportation Group (formerly Husa Capital) is a group of railfreight, logistics and rail services companies founded in 1998, the group's main business arm on foundation was ACTS Nederland BV (ACTS), founded 1989, an open access freight operator in the Netherlands.

In 2014 the company announced it would exit the rail freight operating business, and dispose of the assets of its 'Husa Transportation Rail Services' (HTRS) subsidiaries.

== History ==
ACTS Nederland BV was founded in 1989, and developed systems for transloading of containerised waste from road to rail without the use of cranes. (Note: The system was named the Afzet Container Transport Systeem, giving rise to the acronym ACTS. (see also ACTS (containersysteem) Dutch language or Abrollcontainer-Transportsystem German language)) In 1997 the ACTS container service were discontinued by NS Cargo. Subsequently, ACTS gained a license to operate as a railway company, and on 16 March 1998 began to operate waste container trains between Groningen and VAM (Note: Vuil Afvoer Maatschappij (VAM) was a waste disposal company. (See also VAM Dutch language)) in Wijster, becoming the first private Dutch rail company. In 1999 the company began transporting ISO Containers for Vos Logistics.

In 2004 Husa Capital BV obtained a majority of shares in ACTS, Ir John Hoekwater, ACTS's founding director was replaced by Rob van Gansewinkel. By 2004 ACTS had acquired a 7% market share of rail freight in the Netherlands.

In the summer of 2006 ACTS in association with the Dutch railway infrastructure authority ProRail operated test trains on the Betuweroute. In January 2007 ACTS obtained certification to operate on the German rail system.

By January 2008 Husa Capital's stake in ACTS had risen above 90%, and at the beginning of the same year ACTS was reorganised into independent operating companies with rolling stock leasing being taken over by RailMotion AG (Basel, Switzerland); the company inherited over 300 intermodal wagons. On the same date rolling stock maintenance was split into the company The Rail Factory BV based at Apeldoorn and Amersfoort, and specialising in the maintenance of locomotives. A business sub-unit Portfeeders was also formed, to concentrate on 'feeder operations' (shunting) in the Port of Rotterdam.

On 23 January 2008 ACTS obtained certification to operate on the Belgian railway network from the national railway network company Infrabel.

In January 2009 Husa Capital BV renamed itself Husa Transportation Group.

Husa Transportation Deutschland was formed by the acquisition of Rent-a-rail GmbH (railway construction locomotive leasing) and SRS RailService (rolling stock broker) in May 2009.

De Vries Transport Services, based in Veendam was acquired in September 2009 after bankruptcy, and renamed InterModal Solutions Veendam (IMS-Veendam). The company undertakes road transport, and operates terminals in Veendam and Leeuwarden. Bulk cargo handling (powders and granules) is carried out at Veendam, and warehousing at the Groningen Railport intermodal terminal in Veendam.

In January 2014 the company announced it was to exit the rail freight transportation business, citing uncompetitive infrastructure access costs. The subsidiaries HRTS Nederlands and HRTS Süd were to be offered for sale, whilst rolling stock leasing company Rail Motion, and container shuttle business Shuttlewise were to remain in business.

== Group structure ==
Since the end of 2008 the group is divided into three divisions Husa Railway Services (rail freight and leasing), Husa Logistic Services (intermodal freight) and Husa Rolling Stock Services (locomotive and rolling stock maintenance).

The subdivisions are:

- Husa Railway Services
  - ACTS Railways
  - Portfeeders
  - Husa Transportation Deutschland
- Husa Logistics Services
  - IMS
  - Shuttlewise, joint venture with Den Hartog Logistics
- Husa Rolling Stock Services
  - The Railfactory
  - Rail Service Benelux, joint venture with WRS (Westdeutsche Rail Service GmbH.), (Duisburg)

== Rolling stock ==
=== ACTS ===
The company began rail operations in 1999, and by 2000 had five 1500 V DC ex-NS Class 1200s, 5 ex-SNCB Class 62 diesel mainline locomotives and ex-Czech Railways diesel shunters built in East Germany. The 1200 electrics and 6700 diesels were modified to work in multiple and were often used in pairs for better performance.

In 2003 three ex-British Rail Class 58s were acquired, which operated until 2009 when EMD Series 66 leased from Mitsui Rail Capital (MCRE) began to replace them. MaK / Vossloh G1206 (light freight and shunting) locomotives also began to be leased on short and long-term contracts from MRCE and Angel Trains Cargo after 2004.

In 2008 ACTS started to acquire a second set of 1500 V DC locomotives, former NS Class 1600 machines from Railion Nederlands., and from 2009 onwards mainline freight locomotives Vossloh G2000 BB were leased from Angel Trains Cargo and MRCE.

In 2009 ACTS leased its first Eurosprinter ES 64 F4 quad-voltage freight locomotive.

ACTS class	Locomotive type	Service dates	Total units cumulative	notes
E 1250	NS Class 1200	1999-2009	5	The locomotives were to be scrapped; ACTS took legal action with an appeal to the Netherlands Competition Authority (Nederlandse Mededingingsautoriteit) since the locomotives had not been offered for sale, and Nederlandse Spoorwegen was not facilitating a sale to potential competitors. 2 units sold to Euro-Express-Treincharter B.V. (EETC)
DH 6000	ČD Class 716 (Note: The shunters were of Deutsche Reichsbahn V 60 4 axle type (see DR-Baureihe V 60 German language) manufactured at LEW-Hennigsdorf for the Czech railways.); DR V 60	2000-	5	3 units (6003 to 6005) sold to Euro-Express-Treincharter B.V. (EETC)
DE 6700	SNCB Class 62	1999-	5	SNCB numbers 6321, 6325, 6391, 6392 and 6393 were acquired for use, and were renumbered from 6701 onwards. 6290 was also acquired for spares.
DE 5800	British Rail Class 58	2003–2009	3	Acquired from EWS, former numbers EWS 58039, EWS 58044, EWS 58038 were renumbered 5811, 5812 and 5814 respectively.
G 1206	G 1206	2004–present	over 10	Numbers used for the class by ACTS are 7100 and upwards
DE Class 66	EMD Series 66	2004-	~5	~3 in service late 2010
	NS Class 1600	2008-	4	Leased from subsidiary RailMotion
	Vossloh G2000 BB	2009-	5	~2/3 in service late 2010
	ES 64 F4	2009-	4	Known as DBAG Class 189 when operating for Deutsche Bahn, leased from MRCE
*Sources

=== RailMotion ===
Since the group restructuring in 2008 RailMotion AG owns wagons suitable for heavy 40' ISO containers, 60' ISO containers, and the ACTS container system, the company also owns and leases locomotives inherited from ACTS, as of January 2011 the company has ten ex-NS Class 1600 electric locomotives.

=== Rent-a-Rail ===
Rent-a-Rail operates shunting locomotives typically of less than 1000 kW power, additionally one Vossloh G1206 and two re-engined DB Class V 100, and an ex-Deutsche Reichsbahn Class V 100 type are also operated as of 2010.

== Liveries ==
The original ACTS livery was a deep blue with a thick horizontal yellow band, intended to be reminiscent of the American Pennsylvania Railroad, some locomotives were painted operated in the livery of one of ACTS customers, Vos Logistics, a livery of black with an orange stripe.

Later machines received a grey green livery; introduced in 2006, The ex-NS 1600 remained in the yellow-grey livery of their previous owner Nederlandse Spoorwegen, whilst other locomotives are in the livery of their leasing company. Some MaK G 1206s used for the Portfeeders subsidiary have received a special livery - slate blue with orange and red shaped diagonal bands.

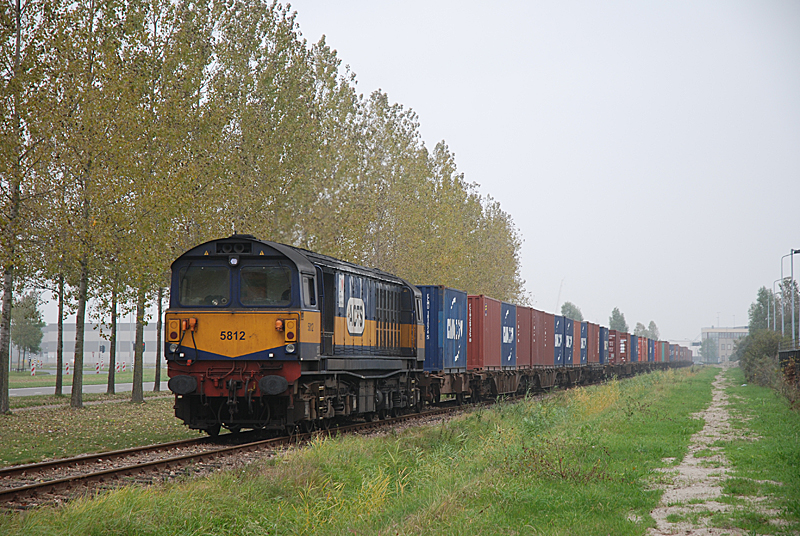
ACTS 5812 in the original blue/yellow livery (2006)

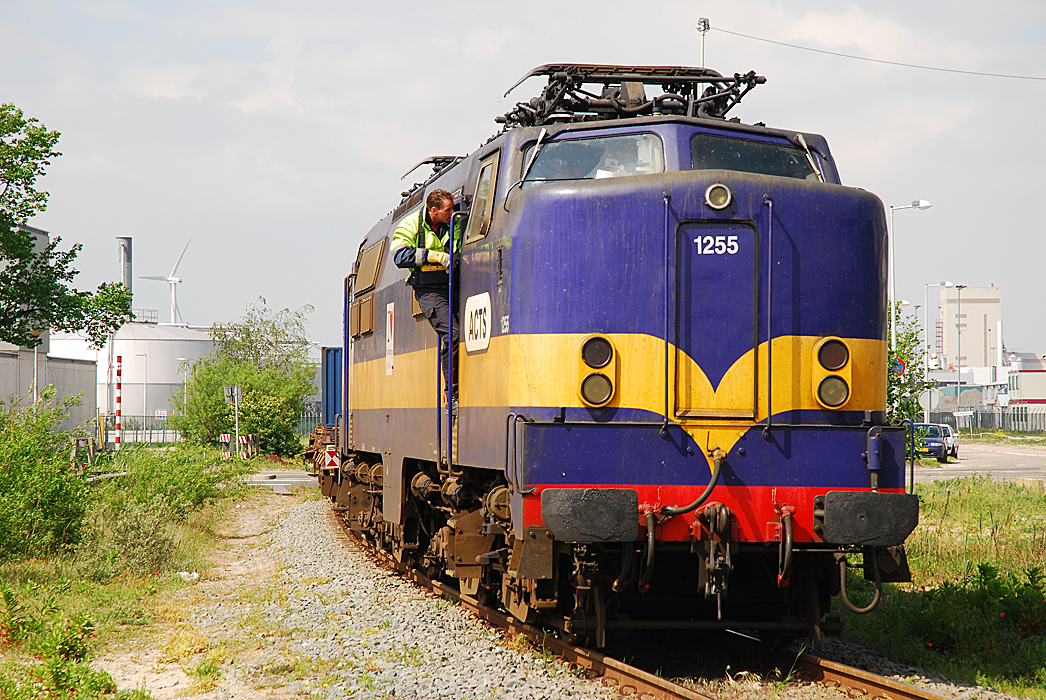
ACTS 1255 in blue/yellow 'USA retro' livery (2007)

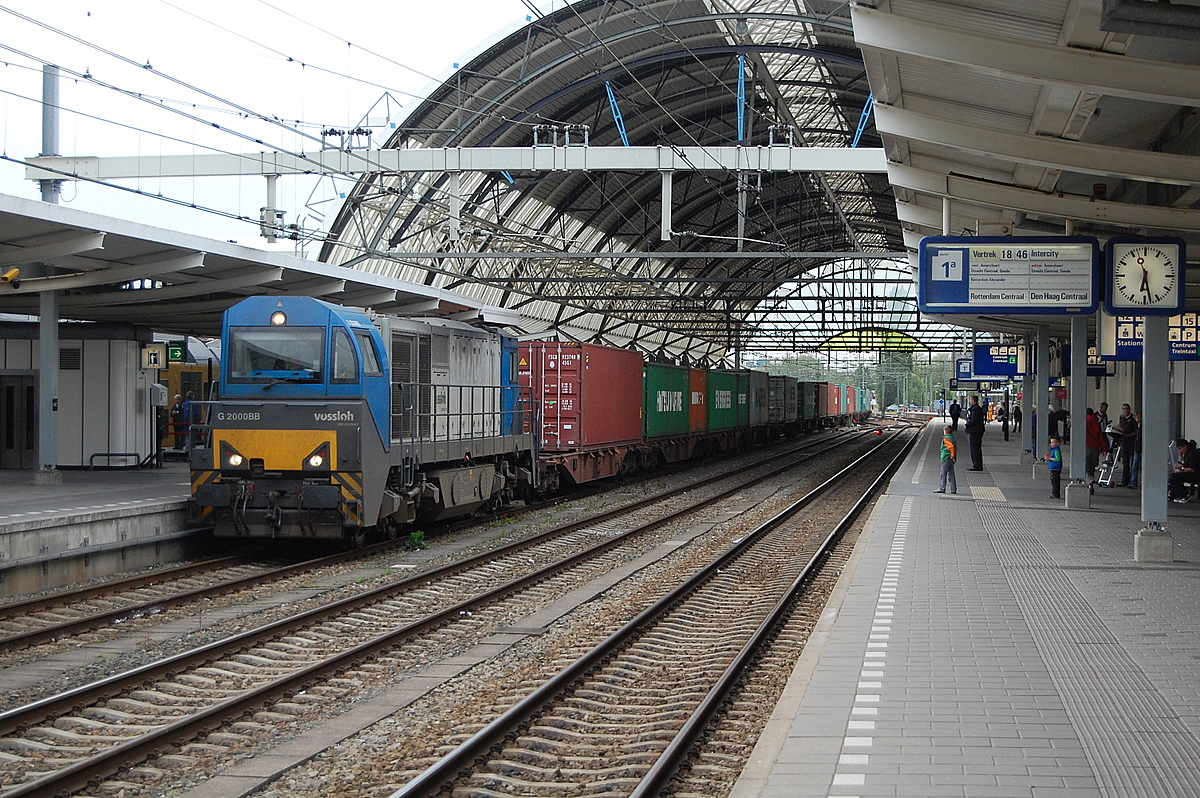
ACTS 1043 (Vossloh G2000) in Angel Trains livery (2009)

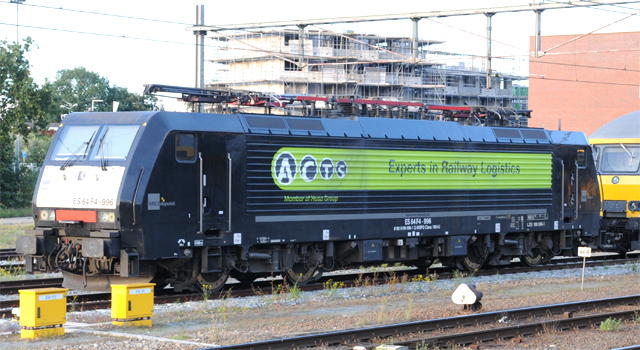
Siemens ES64F4 in black MRCE livery with ACTS branding

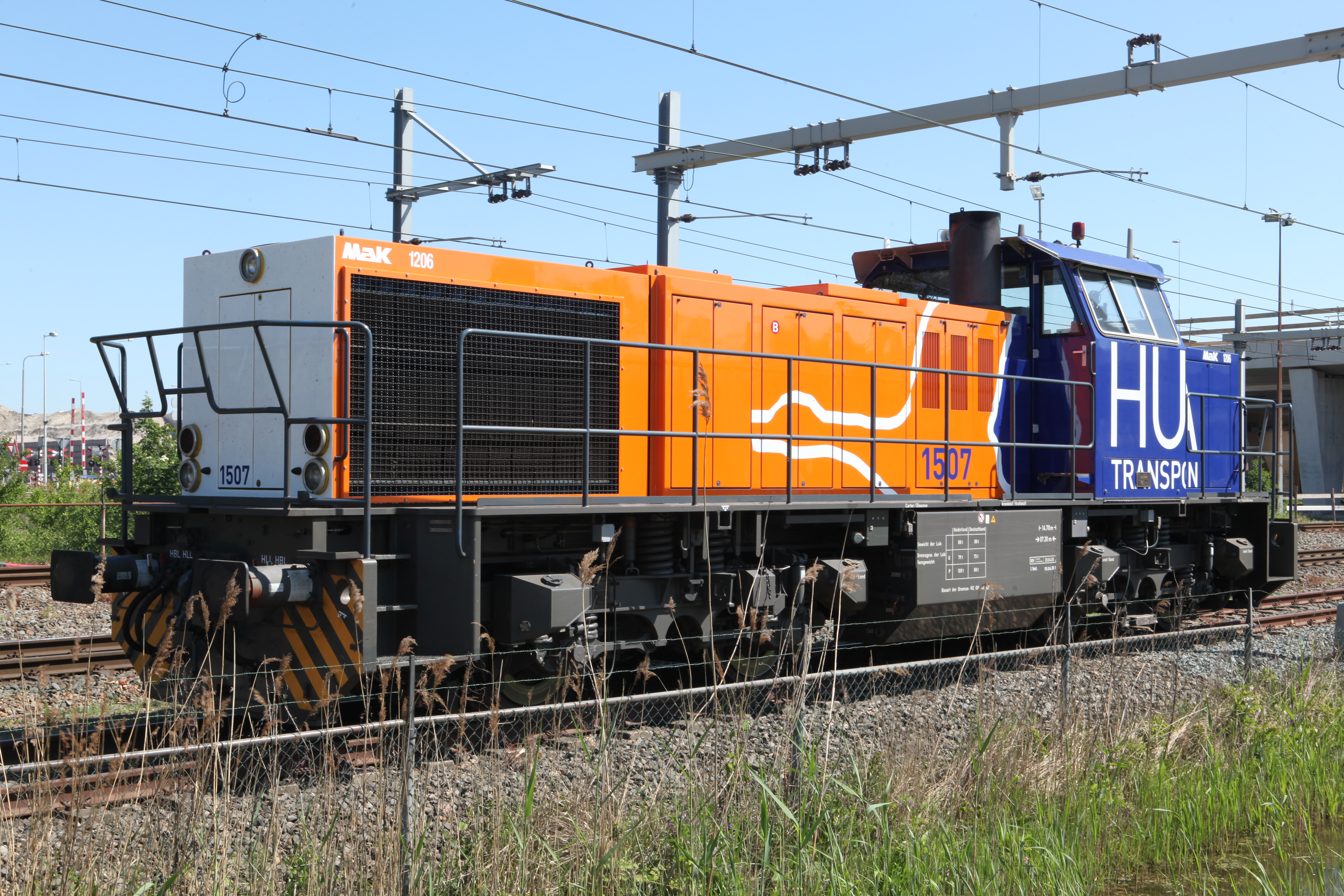
HUSA 1507 (Vossloh G1206) in HUSA livery (2011)

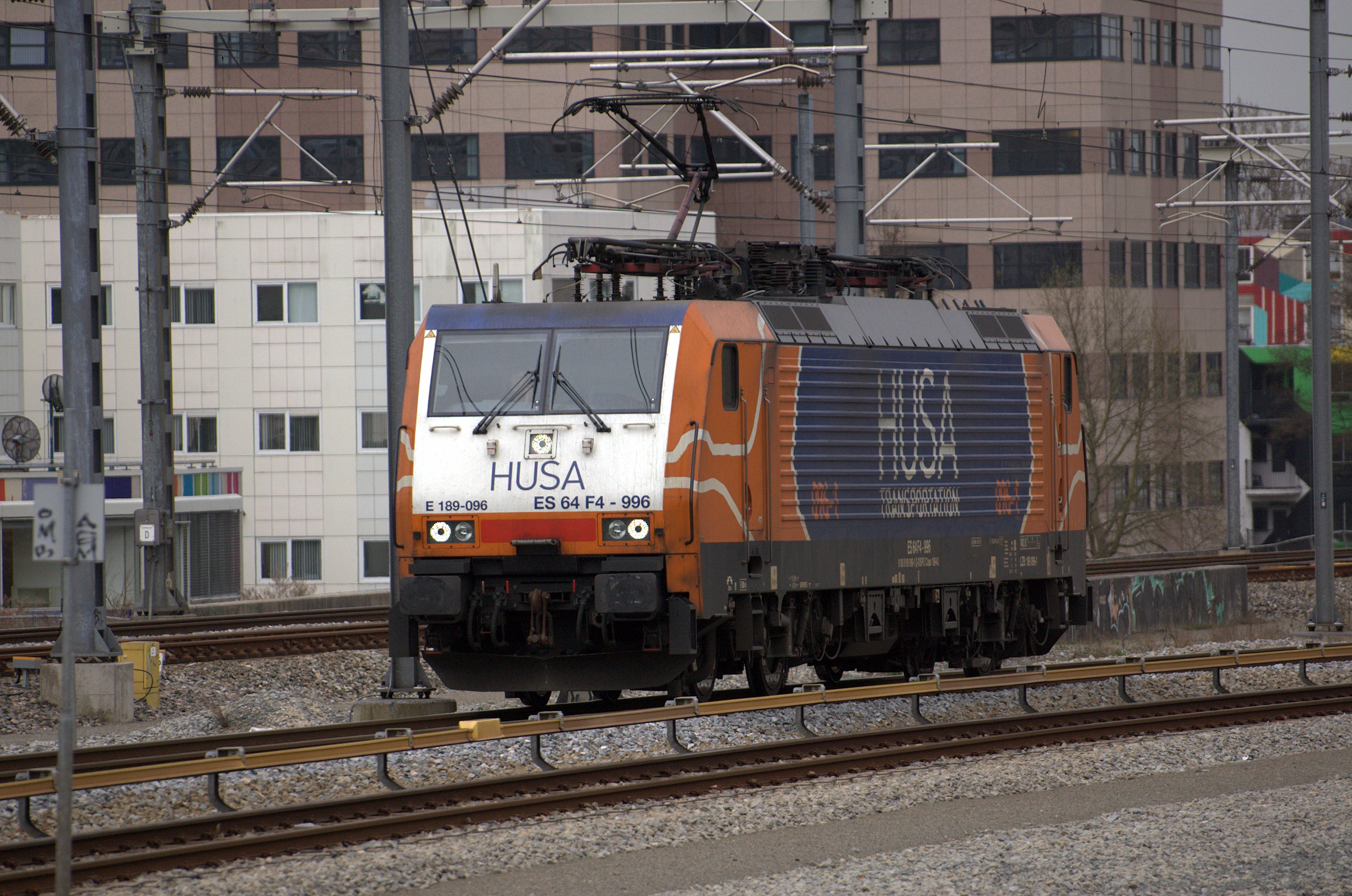
