= Belgian Railways Class 62 =

Class 62
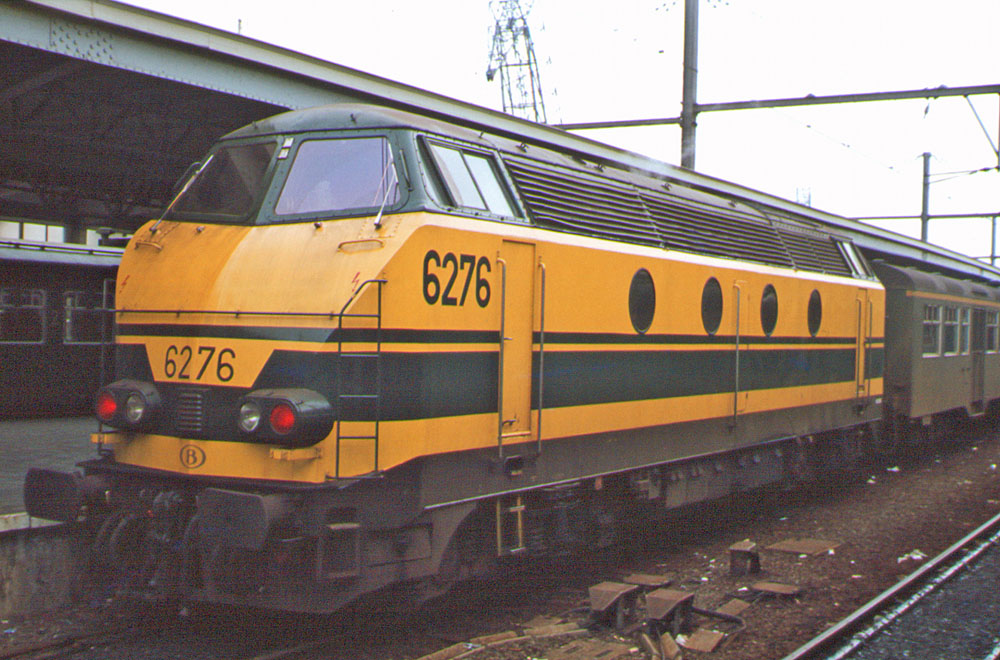
- 6276 at Oostende station in February 1980
Type and origin
- Power type: Diesel
- Builder: BN/ACEC
- Build date: 1961-1966
- Total produced: 136
Specifications
- Configuration
  - UIC: Bo′Bo′
- Gauge: 1,435 mm (4 ft 8 1/2 in) standard gauge
- Driver dia.: 1,010 mm (39.76 in)
- Length: 16.79 m (55 ft 1 in)
- Adhesive weight: 78.6 t (77.4 long tons; 86.6 short tons) (All wheels driving)
- Loco weight: 78.6 t (77.4 long tons; 86.6 short tons)
- Fuel type: Diesel
- Prime mover: GM 12-567C
- Engine type: Diesel
- Cylinders: V12
- Transmission: Electric (ACEC)
Performance figures
- Maximum speed: 120 km/h (75 mph)
- Power output: 1,030 kW (1,380 hp)
- Tractive effort: 212 kN (48,000 lbf)
Career
- Operators: SNCB/NMBS
- Class: 62
- Number in class: 81
- Numbers: 6201-6333, 6391-6393

The Class 62 is a diesel locomotive of the Belgian State Railways.

These diesels found use all over Belgium. Five (6321, 6325, 6391-6393) were sold to ACTS in the Netherlands in 1999.

Four units (6225, 6227, 6313 and 6324) are outfitted with TBL2 signaling and a Scharfenberg coupler. This is for hauling broken-down or unpowered TGVs on line 2. They display the letters "TBL2" on the nose.

Some others have been transferred to Infrabel, who manage the Belgian rail infrastructure; they were repainted in blue and white.
