= Transfesa =

- Industry: Transportation, Logistics
- Headquarters: Calle Musgo 1, Madrid, Spain
- Services: Rail transport, road transport
- Revenue: €290 million (2006)
- Number of employees: 1,125 (2006)
- Website: Company Website

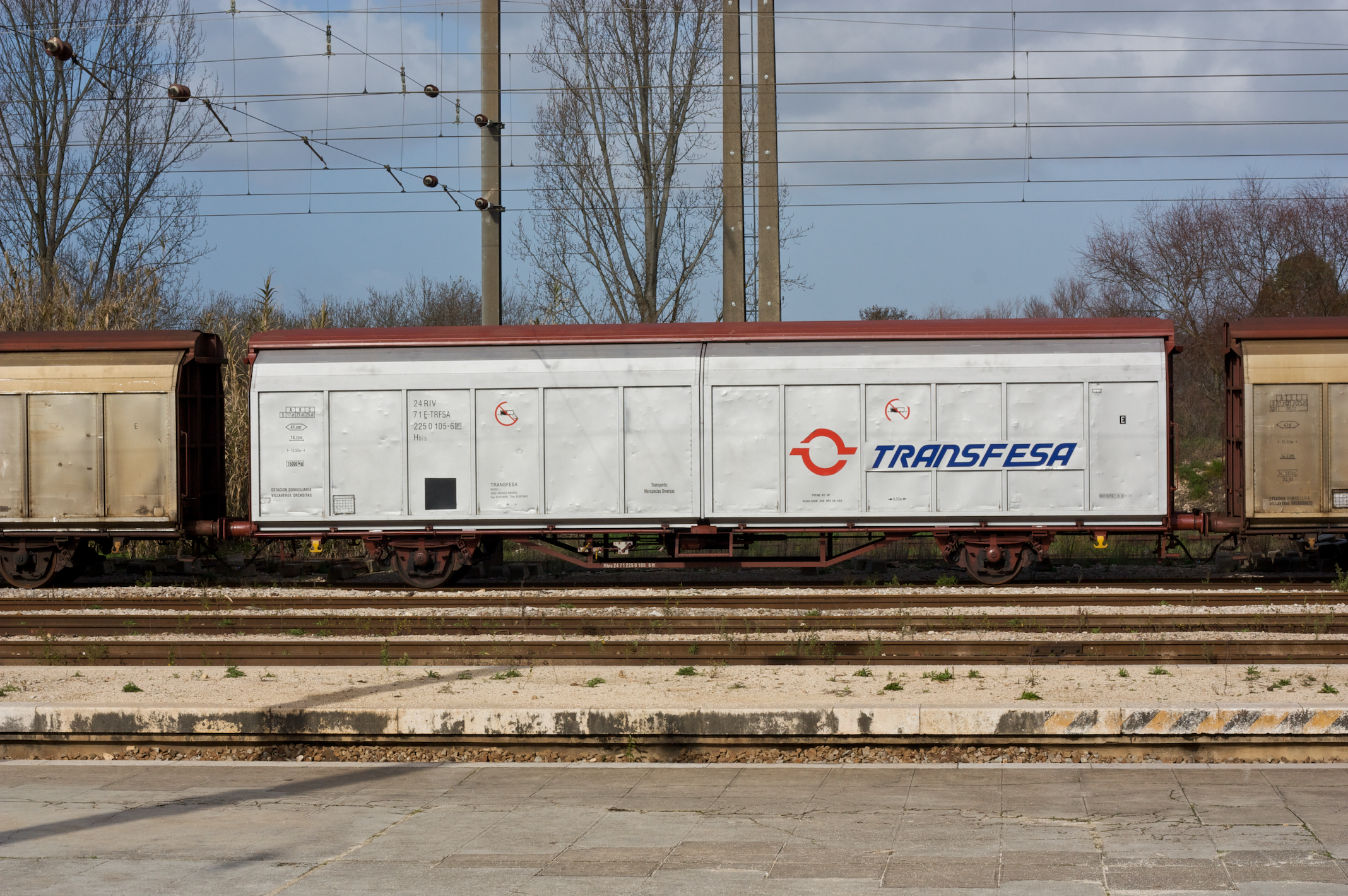

Transfesa (Transportes Ferroviarios Especiales S.A.) is a transport company based in Madrid, Spain. It is a transport and logistics service provider and European intermodal operator. As of 2007 The company has five major terminals in Spain at Madrid, Barcelona, Valencia, Zaragoza and Burgos, and ten intermodal (road rail) logistics facilities.

== Overview ==
Transfesa was founded in 1943, early operations were centered around the domestic transport of livestock. During 1952, it received its first freight wagons to be constructed with interchangeable axles, permitting freight movements between Spain and the rest of Europe without the need from transhipment, thus accelerating service speeds and lowering costs. Throughout the 1950s and 1960s, international traffic grew based around the carriage of fruit exports to western Europe using company's own ventilated wagons.

During the 1960s and 1970s, Transfesa opened numerous branches across Europe, such as in Germany and Switzerland. In 1972, it expanded into the British market as well. During the 1970s and 1980s, the company found new business in the automotive sector, transporting complete cars by rail to dealerships throughout the continent, as well as parts between manufacturing sites. In the 1990s, Transfesa branched out into ancillary activities such as rolling stock maintenance and terminal management services.

In August 2007, the German state-owned railway operator Deutsche Bahn announced that it would acquire a majority stake in Transfesa. During 2008, the takeover was approved by regulators, after which Deutsche Bahn gained a 55.1% of the company in exchange for €135million. Minority shareholders include Renfe and SNCF. By 2022, ownership of Transfesa was distributed between Deutsche Bahn Ibérica Holding (70.29%), Renfe (20.35%), treasury stock (9.11%) and minority shareholders (0.24%).

During October 2014, it was revealed the Spanish competition authorities were investigating both Transfesa and the Spanish national train operator Renfe after the discovery of evidence indicating a possible collusion agreement and abuse of a dominant position by the latter.

During April 2020, Transfesa and DB Cargo UK commenced a daily express freight connection between the British capital city of London and its terminals in Valencia and Murcia. This new service permitted Transfesa to transport vital supplies needed during the COVID-19 pandemic using refrigerated containers that protects perishable supplies. In September 2020, Transfesa launched a new express rail service from the Almussafes rail terminal in Valencia to the Barking rail terminal in the UK, hauling both fruit and vegetable products; the service, which was launched in partnership with the British supermarket retail chain Tesco, makes use of British high-speed lines and Spanish rail gauge changing facilities. Around the same time, the company expanded its services to Dourges, France.

The company has also sought to expand its provision of refrigerated rail freight services under the CoolRail brand; a partnership with Euro Pool System has been formed with the goal of running services to destinations across Europe, including Scandinavia, Germany, and Poland. Transfesa has also stated its aim to maximise use of parent company Deutsche Bahn's infrastructure in pursuit of its expansion. Freight services departing from Transfesa's Valencia terminal have a transit time of around 48 hours to reach cities such as Cologne, Brussels, and Rotterdam; UK destinations take 72 hours while Scandinavian and Eastern European countries are typically reached in 96 hours.

== Rolling stock ==
As of 2011, the company's transportation fleet includes over 7,000 railway wagons, over 2,000 swap bodies and over 200 trucks. The company also operates two rail gauge changing facilities on the France/Spain border.

During the 2010s and 2020s, the company has been deploying digital apparatus, including RFID and GPS trackers, across its rolling stock for various purposes, including traceability, serviceability, usage optimisation, and greater data availability.
