= NS Class 1100 =

Class of Dutch electric locomotives

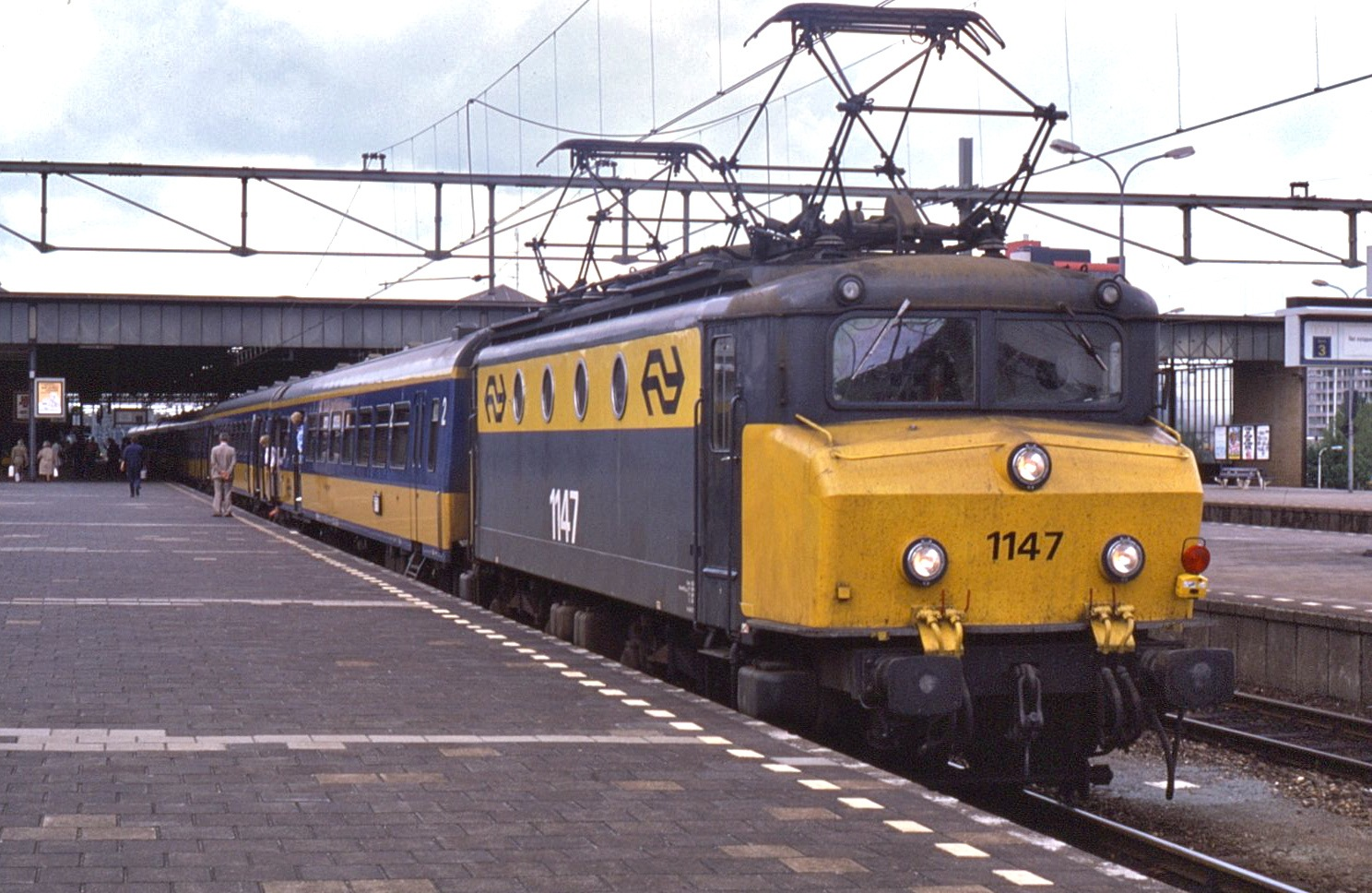
- NS 1147 at Eindhoven station in 1985
Type and origin
- Power type: Electric
- Builder: Alsthom
- Build date: 1950–1956
- Total produced: 60
Specifications
- Configuration
  - UIC: Bo-Bo
- Gauge: 1,435 mm (4 ft 8 1/2 in)
- Driver dia.: 1,250 mm (49.21 in)
- Length: 14.11 m (46 ft 4 in)
- Adhesive weight: 10.4 t (10.2 long tons; 11.5 short tons)
- Loco weight: 83 t (82 long tons; 91 short tons)
- Electric system/s: 1.5 kV DC catenary
- Current pickup: Pantograph
Performance figures
- Maximum speed: 135 km/h (84 mph)
- Power output: 2,030 kW (2,720 hp)
- Tractive effort: 152 kN (34,000 lb_{f})
Career
- Operators: Nederlandse Spoorwegen
- Class: 1100
- Number in class: 60
- Numbers: 1101–1160
- Delivered: 1950–1956
- Disposition: Scrapped or stored awaiting disposal

The Class 1100 was a class of electric locomotives operated by Nederlandse Spoorwegen in The Netherlands. They were built by Alsthom to an original design of the French BB 8100. They operated in The Netherlands.

They have been out of service since 1999, although many were out of service before then. They operated all services, freight and passenger, and were the NS' main locomotive until the arrival of Class 1600s. They were extensively rebuilt between 1978 and 1982.

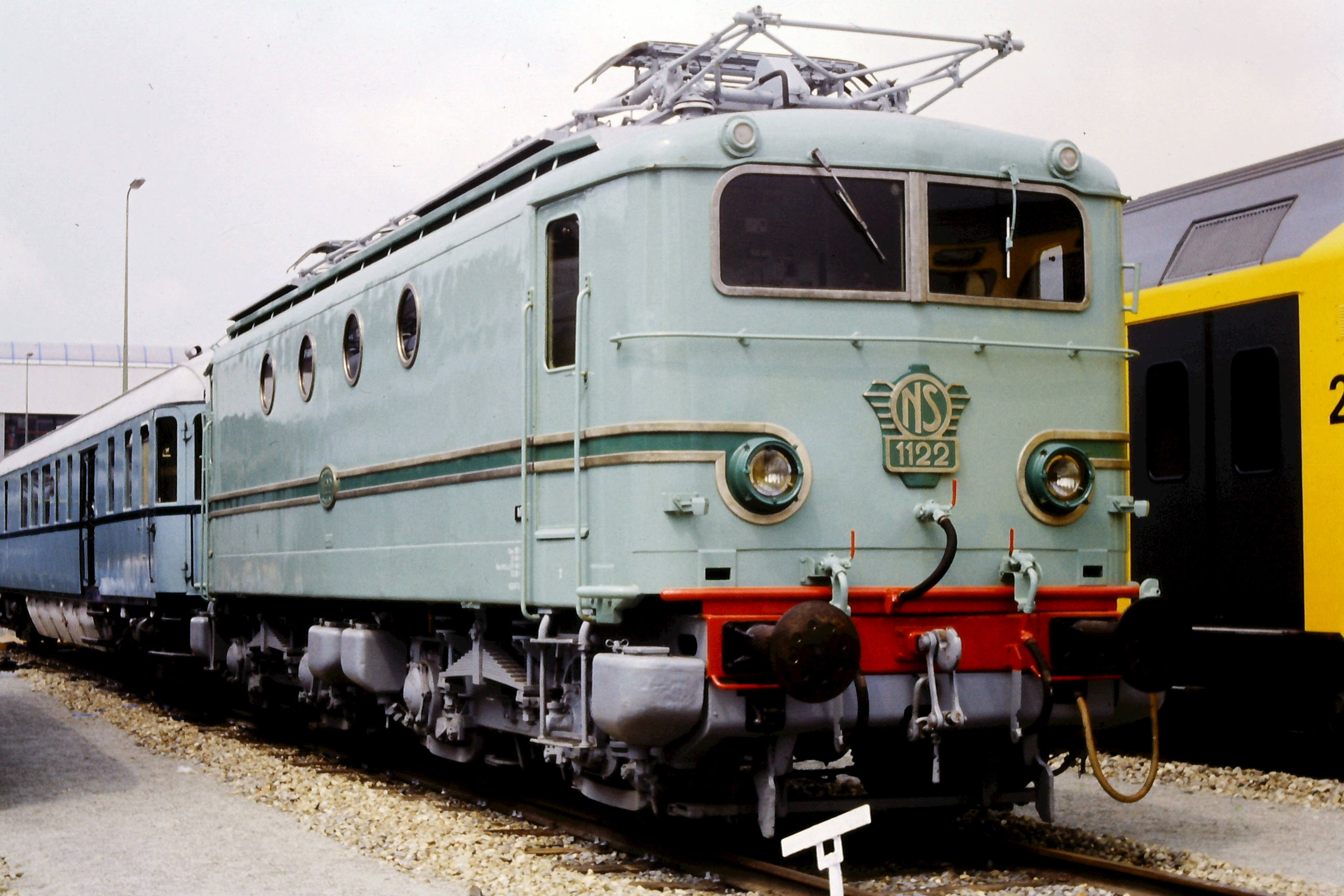
Flat-fronted cab, as originally built

1156 had an accident near Tilburg in 1961, and 1131 was involved in the largest railway accident in the Netherlands at Harmelen. 1129 was involved in an accident in Westervoort in 1978, this locomotive was not destroyed, and was put back in service. In 1986, 1141 derailed at Heeze. After the 1978 accident, the surviving 58 locomotives were rebuilt slightly to improve driver safety, with a crash-absorbing nose ahead of the cab inspired by the French Nez Cassé design.

In 1991, some were withdrawn with the arrival of DD-AR double-deck coaching stock, and Class 1700 locomotives were introduced.

The 1100 series locomotives were unpopular with NS drivers. The locomotives used an unusual design: the buffers are attached to the bogie instead of the main body. Buffers attached to the main body are a common design feature, which provides a steady ride as the body is stabilized because it is pressed against the car it is pulling. The 1100 series lacked this stability, resulting in a very nervous bouncy ride which can be compared to a ride on a wooden roller coaster. The cabin was designed for French drivers in 1950, and anyone taller than 1.70 m (5 ft 7 in) had a hard time in the nonadjustable driver seat, and air drafted around drivers' lower legs. In operation, cooling fans in the engine compartment produced a remarkably loud roar. For these reasons the locomotives were downright hated, and until 1980, their drivers were paid a special bonus, one originally designated for dirty or unpleasant work.

== Preservation ==
Number	Location	Notes
1107	Blerick, owned by Nederlands Spoorwegmuseum	
1122	Watergraafsmeer, owned by SKLOK	
1125	Utrecht, Nederlands Spoorwegmuseum	recently overhauled and delivered in the original delivery condition
1136	Goes, SGB	
1145	Goes, SGB	
