= Werkspoor =

Machine manufacturer in the Netherlands

- Werkspoor logo

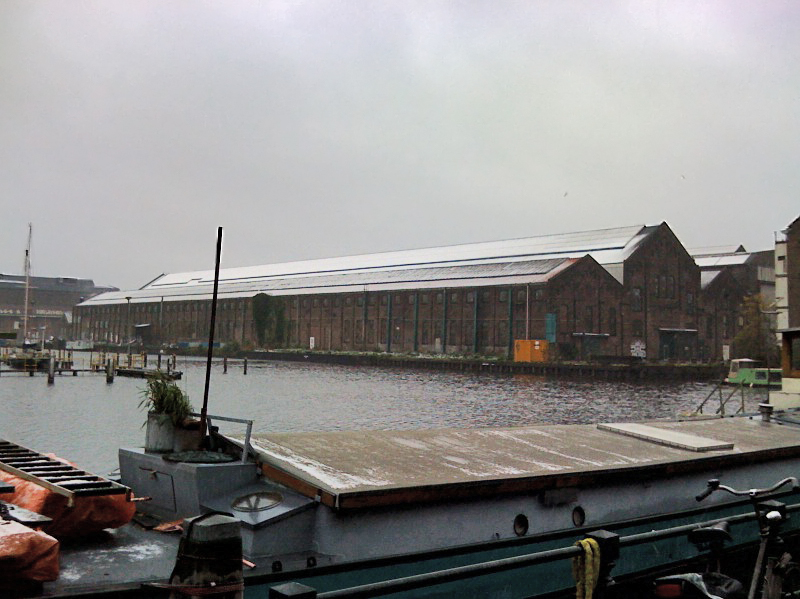
- Werkspoor buildings on Oostenburg, Amsterdam.
- Industry: machines, rolling stock
- Founded: 1890
- Founder: Paul van Vlissingen, Abraham Dudok van Heel
- Defunct: 1989
- Headquarters: Amsterdam, Zuilen

Werkspoor N.V. was the shortened, and later the official name of the Nederlandsche Fabriek van Werktuigen en Spoorwegmaterieel. It was a Dutch machine factory, known for manufacturing rolling stock, (ship) steam engines, and diesel engines. It was a successor of the company Van Vlissingen en Dudok van Heel, later named Koninklijke Fabriek van Stoom- en andere Werktuigen. In 1954 Werkspoor was merged with Stork.

== Founded as Nederlandsche Fabriek van Werktuigen en Spoorwegmaterieel ==
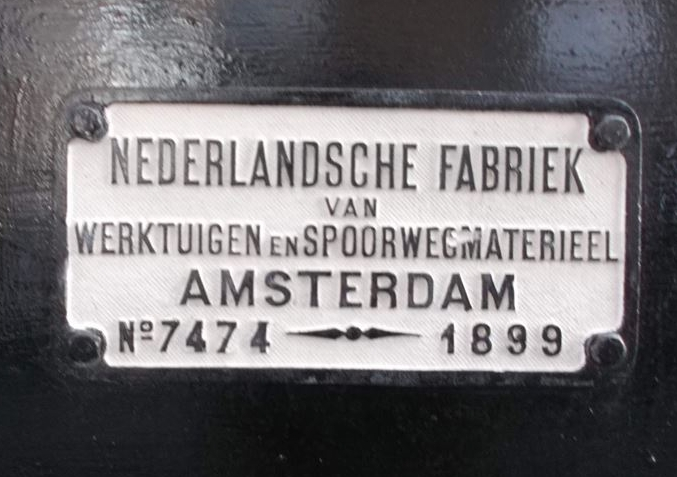
Nameplate on an Engine by KNFWS 1899

In March 1890 the predecessor of Werkspoor asked for an automatic stay. After many years of heavy losses the financial world lacked confidence in this predecessor, the Koninklijke Fabriek van Stoom- en andere Werktuigen. What was needed was a radical restructuring and new leadership. Because of the national and city interest, authorities intervened to bring this about. The mayor of Amsterdam G. van Tienhoven succeeded in engaging C.T. Stork (owner of the machine factory Stork) in the operation and to provide a good manager.

On 22 May 1891 a new company was founded named Nederlandsche Fabriek van Werktuigen en Spoorwegmaterieel (Dutch factory for tools and rolling stock). It bought all assets of its predecessor for 1,500,500 guilders, of which 920,500 went to a mortgage on the grounds of the factory. On 1 June 1891 C.H. Strumphler started as new CEO. The supervisory board was formed by: L. Serrurier of the municipal government of Amsterdam, C.T. Stork member of the Dutch senate, Jacob Theodoor Cremer and W.J. Geertsema of the House of Representatives, and two members representing a Dutch railroad: J.A. Roessingh van Iterson of the Hollandsche IJzeren Spoorweg-Maatschappij and H.J. Nivel of the Maatschappij tot Exploitatie van Staatsspoorwegen

When the company (re)opened on 1 June 1891 it had 124 employees. New work came in slowly at first. The confidence in the old factory had been damaged, and had to be regained by the new factory. It gained some small orders for the navy, but rolling stock manufacture helped the company through the difficult first years. The company also had to spend a lot of money to restore the lack of maintenance of buildings and machinery during the last years of the Koninklijke Fabriek. A lot of machines were too old and too costly to operate and had to be replaced. The complex also required multiple connections to the railroad system. In 1893 J.T. Cremer was approached to found a new shipyard, which became the Nederlandsche Scheepsbouw Maatschappij. It meant that the company lost the slipways in which so much had been invested. However, it gained a neighbor that was much better in building ships, and required a steady stream of ship engines.

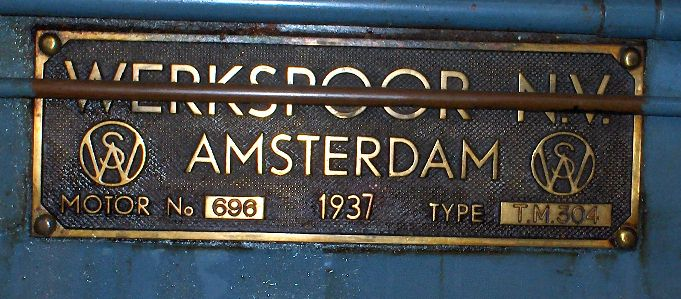
Nameplate on a Werkspoor engine 1937

In 1929 the telegraphy address Werkspoor would become the official name of the company. In 1954 Werkspoor was joined with Stork and became part of Verenigde Machinefabrieken Stork-Werkspoor (VMF).

== Activities of Werkspoor ==
=== Rolling stock ===
Movie news from 1951. At Werkspoor in Utrecht the first electric locomotives of the NS Class 1200 were built in 1951.

The Dutch railroad companies had provided crucial support for the founding of the new company in 1891. Their goal was that the new company would manufacture rolling stock. So the company started this trade, even though it had only one employee who still had experience with this from the previous company. Therefore the manufacturing of rolling stock was initially limited to railroad cars and the like. The Netherlands–South African Railway Company ordered a big number of cargo cars at good prices, an order that was very helpful for the new company.

In 1897 a big order by the Netherlands–South African Railway Company for 40 locomotives led to a breakthrough. It led to the construction of three big halls on Oostenburg designed by A.L. van Gendt, and the company producing locomotives in addition to wagons. In 1913, the manufacturing of railroad cars and steel constructions moved to industrial park Lage Weide in Zuilen, now a suburb of Utrecht. A new factory complex for up to 6,000 employees was built, and to house them the village Nieuw-Zuilen was founded, which is now the city quarters Elinkwijk and De Lessepsbuurt. In Utrecht, some famous bridges were built, as were the Waalbrug in Nijmegen and the Bommelse Brug near Zaltbommel.

In the first years after World War II there was a lot of work to repair the Dutch railroad and tramway stock. Werkspoor also built a lot of new locomotives and carriages for the Dutch railroads. Orders were often shared with Beijnes in Haarlem and Allan of Rotterdam. With the independence of Indonesia, Werkspoor lost a big market for its railway products. In 1951 this was temporarily compensated by a big order of 90 locomotives and 400 carriages from Argentina. It created work for seven years, and drove the number of employees to 5,000. By 1968 Werkspoor had so much work (e.g. plan V for the Dutch railways, and a big series of trams for Amsterdam), that it forwarded work to the German company Duewag. Nevertheless, the long-term prospects for the rolling stock division were not bright, because it only delivered to the Dutch market. In 1972 the division was closed.

=== Machinery ===
In addition to producing rolling stock, Werkspoor also remained active in machinery, in particular ship engines. In its first years it built the machines for the protected cruisers HNLMS Koningin Wilhelmina der Nederlanden, HNLMS Holland (1896), and HNLMS Utrecht (1898).

In 1910, it produced the first diesel engine for a sea-going ship, the Vulcanus, for the Bataafse Petroleum Maatschappij. In the early 20th century, it also started to produce cooling machines in license from Linde AG. In 1960, a new big factory hall was built on the Amsterdam–Rhine Canal in Utrecht. It was to be used for the construction of large boilers and machines, the Apparatenhal, since 2013 known as Werkspoorkathedraal. In 1989, the engine division Stork-Werkspoor-Diesel (SWD) was bought by the Finnish company Wärtsilä.

=== Aircraft ===
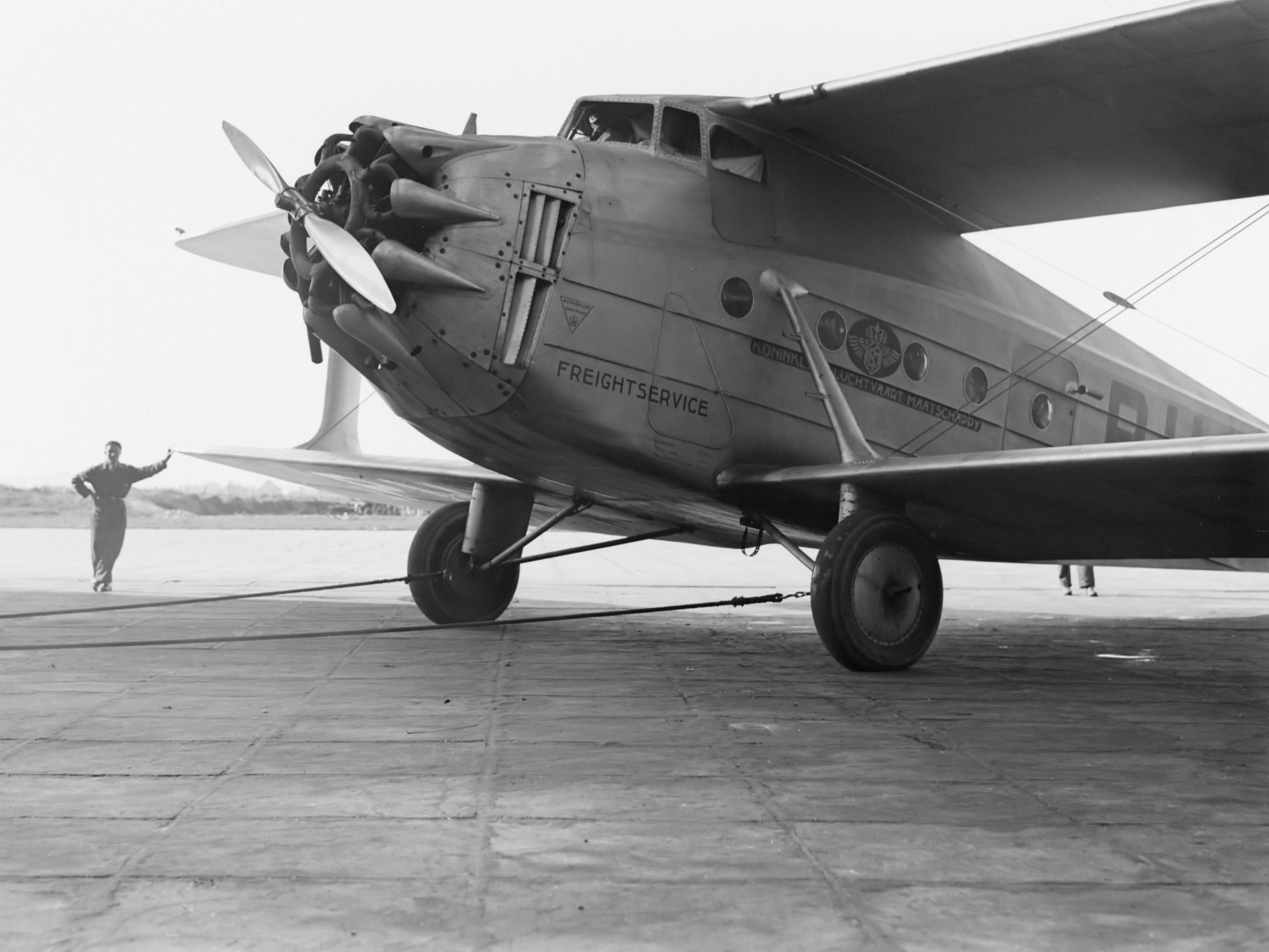
Jumbo cargo plane

Werkspoor was somewhat active in Dutch aeronautical industry. In 1925 it was involved in the construction of the first Dutch helicopter by Albert Gillis von Baumhauer. In 1930, KLM executive Albert Plesman ordered Werkspoor to create a cargoplane after a design by Joop Carley. The development of the Werkspoor Jumbo in cooperation with Pander & Son was plagued by the engine overheating. In 1931 the Jumbo made its first flight. The only specimen flew two years as a cargo plane for the KLM, and then seven years as a trainer. At the start of World War II, the plane was lost in a bombardment.

Werkspoor worked as a subcontractor for Fokker in the late 1930s. By February 1939, 500 of the 2,000 employees working for Fokker were working at the Werkspoor location Zuilen. These were woodworkers that had been moved because there was not enough room for them in the rapidly expanding Fokker factory in Amsterdam. The wings of the Fokker Fokker G.I, first flight 1937, were made of wood. While the wings of the first G.I. were not built in Zuilen, Werkspoor did built wing parts for the Fokker G.I.

In the 1950s the Netherlands, Belgium, and the United States planned to build 460 Hawker Hunter fighter jets. In the context of a NATO plan, part of this would be financed by the United States. The engines would be built by FN in Belgium. For constructing the airplane a consortium was founded.

- Fokker: principal contractor, also responsible for final assembly of the entire Dutch part and elements of the Belgian aircraft. Construction of the rear-part of the airframe.
- Werkspoor: construction of central part of the airframe
- Aviolanda: construction of the front of the airframe
- Société Anonyme Belge de Constructiona Aéronautiques (Sabca): construction of the wings and landing gear (license Dowty)
- Avions-Fairey: final assembly of part of the Belgian planes

=== Busses ===
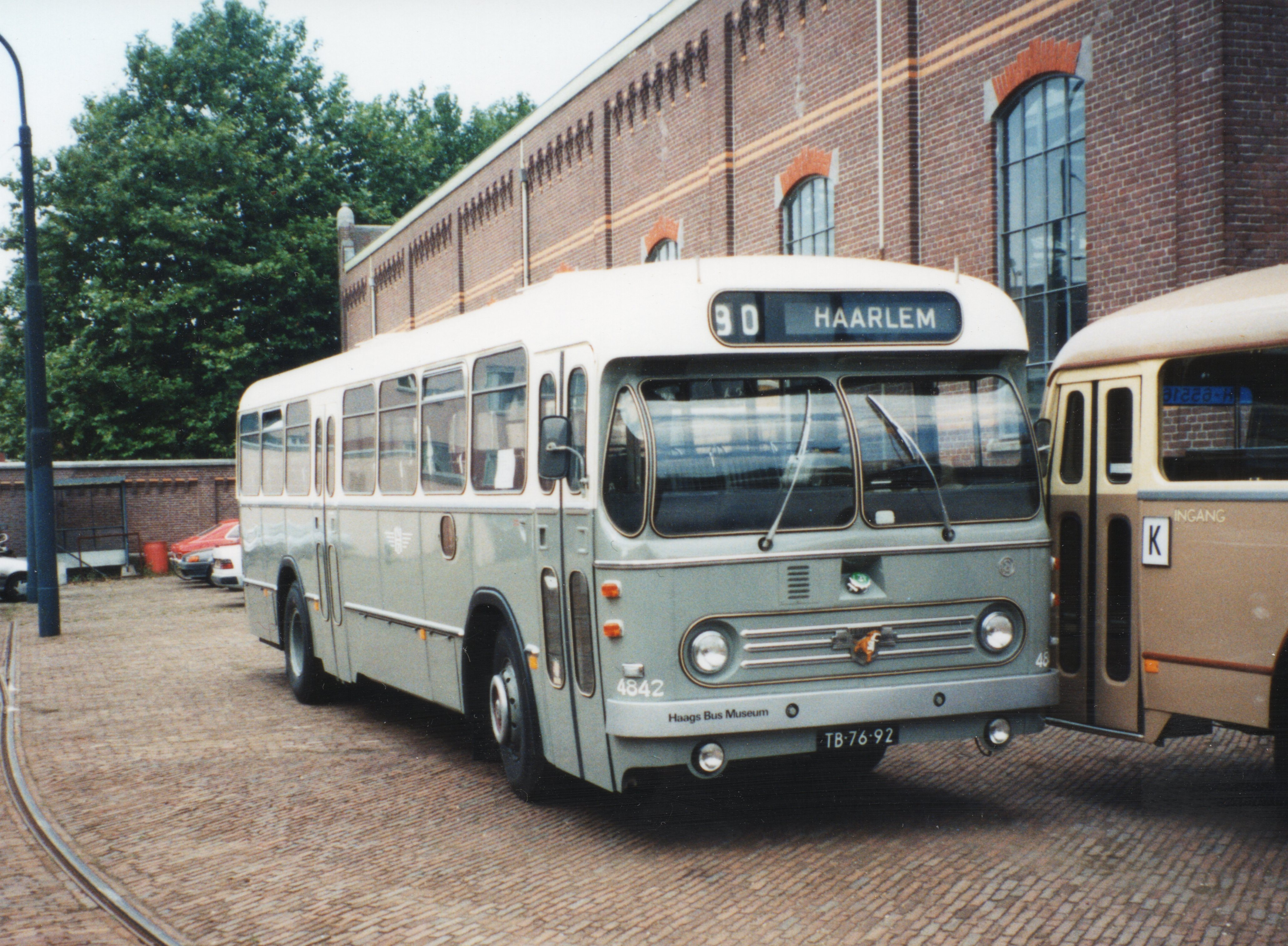
Leyland-Werkspoor LE-WS bus of the NZHSTM

Werkspoor built busses before and after the Second World War. In the late 1940s, 195 Crossley busses were built for local public transport companies owned by the Nederlandse Spoorwegen. After that, Werkspoor did not build any more busses, however, seven years later it re-entered the market by request of the Nederlandse Spoorwegen, that wanted to prevent the big coachbuilder Verheul from gaining a monopoly. Verheul was able to build busses with a self-supporting body, and Nederlandse Spoorwegen thought that Werkspoor should also be able to do so. From 1956-1962 Nederlandse Spoorwegen and its subsidiaries received 477 Leyland-Werkspoor Bolramer busses. In 1962 Werkspoor sold the bus division to Hainje in Heerenveen, now part of VDL Groep.

=== Radio telescope ===
In 1956, Werkspoor together with Philips, the Royal Netherlands Meteorological Institute, and some Dutch universities built the Dwingeloo Radio Observatory.

=== Hyperbaric chamber ===
In 1959 Werkspoor used the first pressure chamber for hyperbaric medicine for medical purposes. Customer was the Wilhelmina Gasthuis in Amsterdam. After the Wilhelmina Gasthuis became part of the Academic Medical Center in Amsterdam, the chamber moved to the Meibergdreef, where it is still used.

=== Nuclear reactor and ultracentrifuges ===
The first experiments with the use of ultracentrifuges for enriching uranium were executed by the Dutch physicist Dr. Jacob Kistemaker in the basements of Werkspoor in Amsterdam. This finally led to founding the uranium enrichment plant Urenco in Almelo in 1969. In the 1970s Werkspoor built the reactor pressure vessel for the KEMA Suspensie Test Reactor (KSTR), an experimental nuclear reactor used by KEMA in Arnhem from 1974-1979 for studies.

== Legacy ==
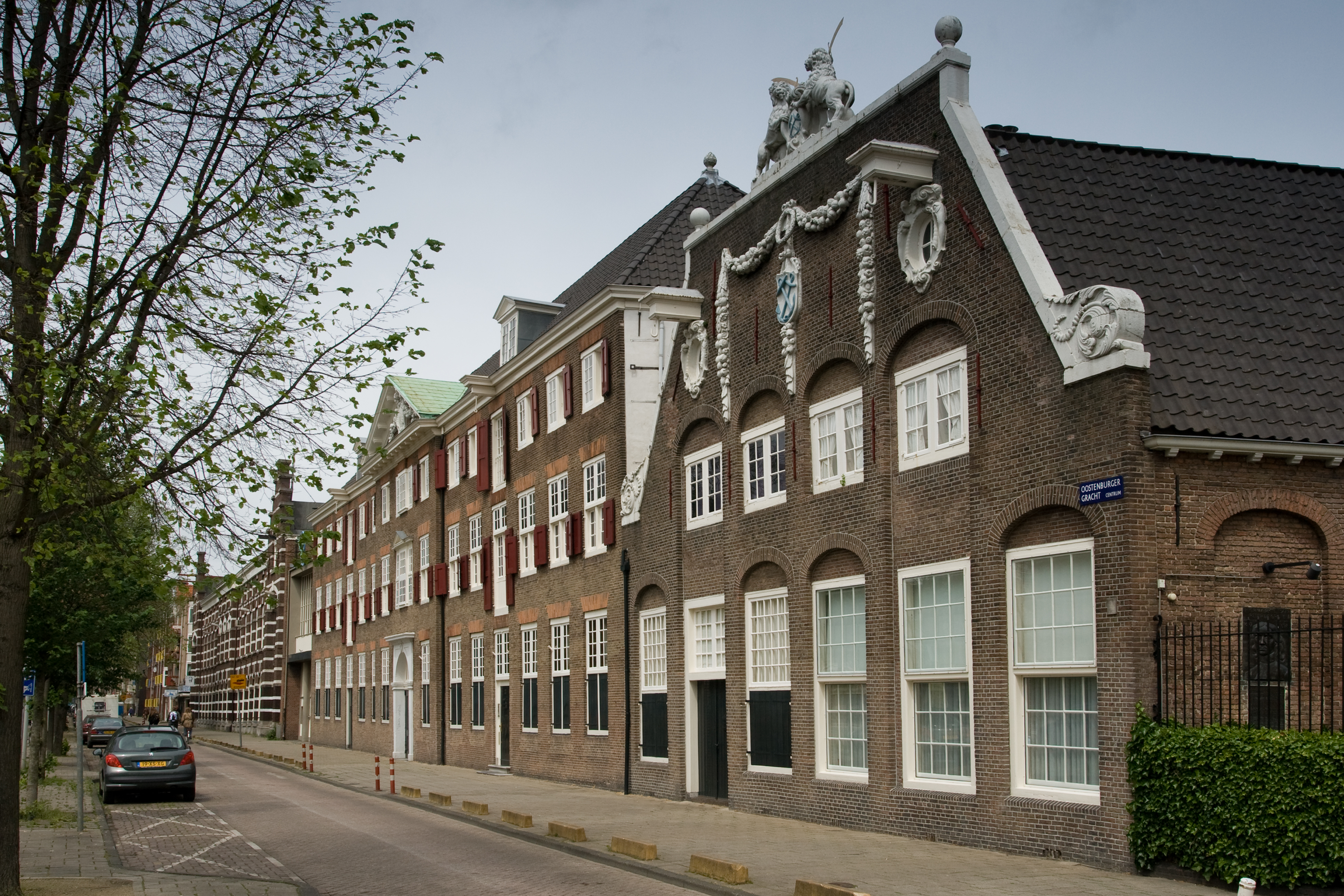
The Werkspoormuseum in the former admiralty building on the Oostenburgergracht.

In Amsterdam there was a Werkspoormuseum. Since 1950 it was housed the former ropewalk of the Dutch East Indies Company. This 500 meter long building called Lijnbaan dates from 1660. The lower level had items from the Dutch East Indies company, the first floor treated the industrial heritage of Werkspoor. The museum was also a representative building for Stork, but was not open to the public, and was finally closed in 2011. Owner Stork then looked for a new place to house the collection in 2012.

On 12 September 2009 the Museum van Zuilen was opened on the de Amsterdamsestraatweg 569 in Utrecht, housing a Werkspoor-collection, focused on the Utrecht factory. They moved to a former ‘apparatenhal’ of Werkspoor at Schaverijstraat 13, Zuilen-Utrecht in June 2020.

== Overview of rolling stock built by Werkspoor ==
An overview of rolling stock built by Werkspoor after World War II. Ordered by customer.

=== Nederlandse Spoorwegen ===
==== Locomotives ====
- Locomotor NS Class 200/300 series (except 281-306) ('Sik')
- Diesel locomotives NS Class 400
- Diesel locomotives NS 450
- Diesel locomotives NS 2600
- Electrical locomotives NS Class 1000 together with SLM/Oerlikon Contraves
- Electrical locomotives NS Class 1200 together with Baldwin Locomotive Works/Westinghouse Electric Company

==== Trainsets ====
- Plan A (Mat '46) - together with Beijnes
- Plan B (Mat '46) - together with Allan and Beijnes
- Plan AB (Mat '46)
- Plan F (Mat '54) - together with Allan and Beijnes
- Plan G (Mat '54) - together with Allan
- Plan P (Mat '54)
- Plan Q (Mat '54)
- Benelux-trainsets (Mat '57)
- Plan U (Dieseldrieën)
- Plan X (Diesel-1 and 2) - together with Allan and Beijnes, nicknamed "Blauwe Engelen"
- Plan T (Mat '64)
- Plan V (Mat '64) Build until 1972 (treinstel 840). Later by Talbot
- Plan mP (Motorpost)
- SBB-CFF-FFS RAm TEE I and NS DE4 (Trans Europe Express, together with SBB)

==== Carriages ====
- Plan D - Together with Beijnes
- Plan E - Together with Beijnes
- Plan N
- Plan W

=== GVB (Amsterdam) ===
- Trams: Amsterdam drieasser-trams (numbers 491-550 and 951-1000).
- Trams: gelede wagens: Amsterdam's articulated trams (Beijnes/Werkspoor)|5G, 6G, 7G, numbers 653-669, 670-699 rear wagons by Düwag and 700-724.

=== HTM (Den Haag) ===
- Trams: serie 201-216 (1948, Haagse vierasser, nickname "Zwitsers")

=== RET (Rotterdam) ===
- Metrotype M|Metro: 5000-series.
- Trams: 300- and 600/1600-series.

=== Staatsmijnen ===
- Diesel locomotives DHB 450/500 (SM 171-183 (500 hp) and SM 191-196 (650 hp)
- Cargo cars: 2-axle zelflossers

== Gallery of Werkspoor products ==
=== Miscellaneous ===
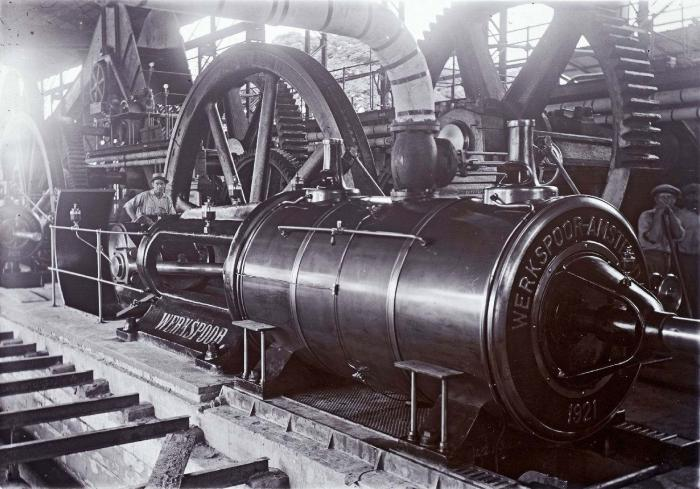
Steam engine in a sugar factory in Suriname.

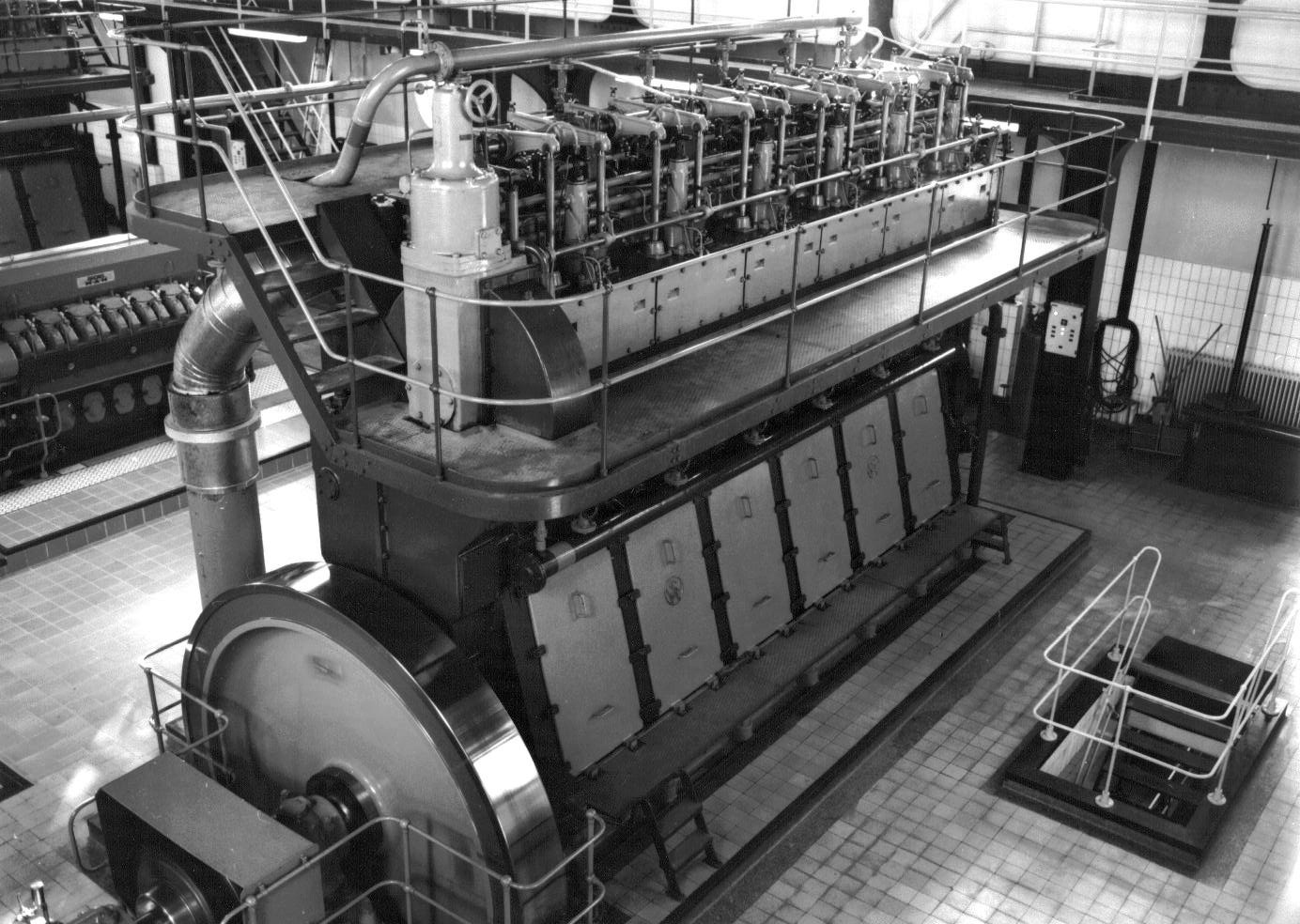
Stationary Werkspoor diesel engine.

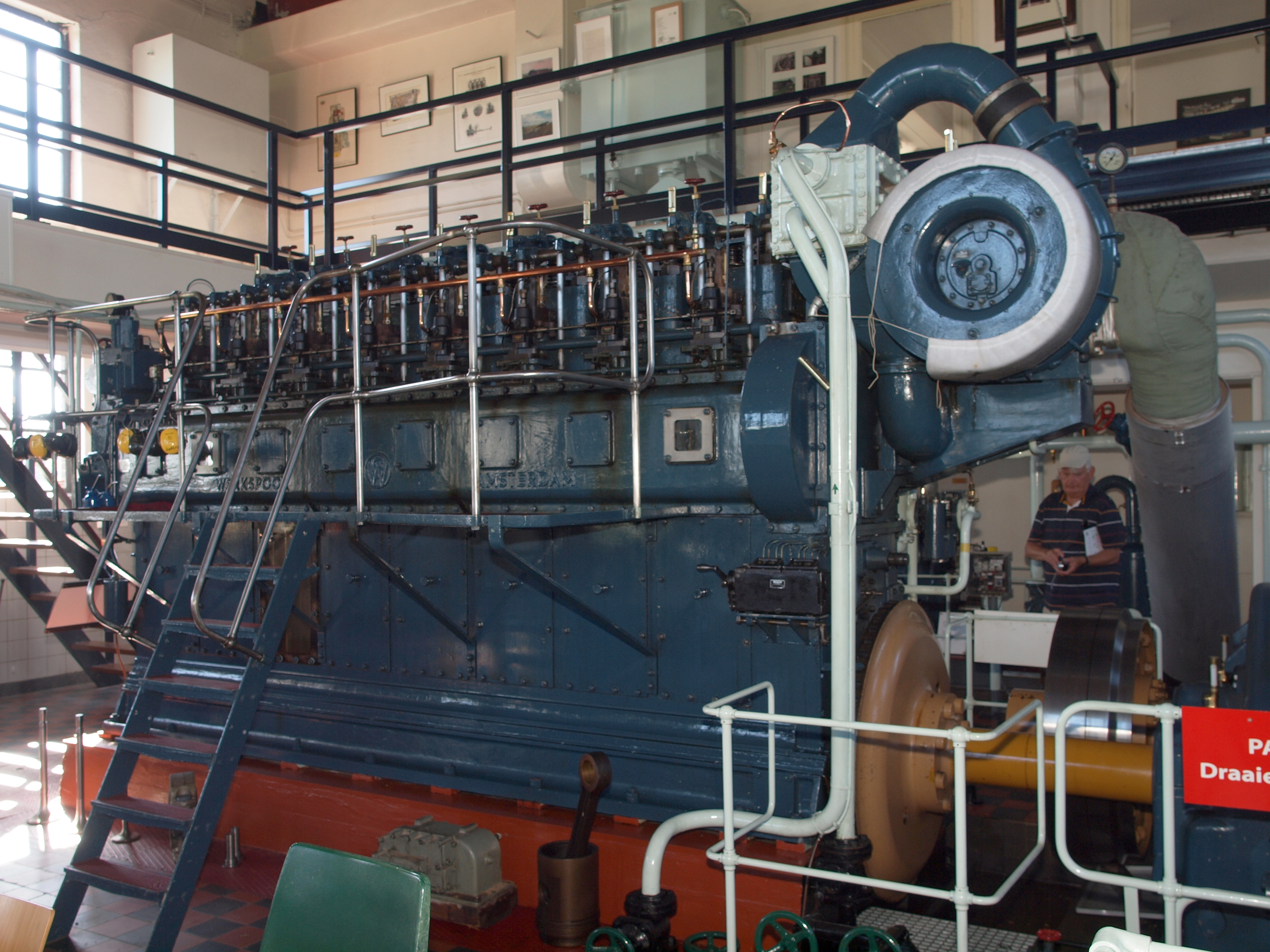
Diesel engine Gemaal Cremer.

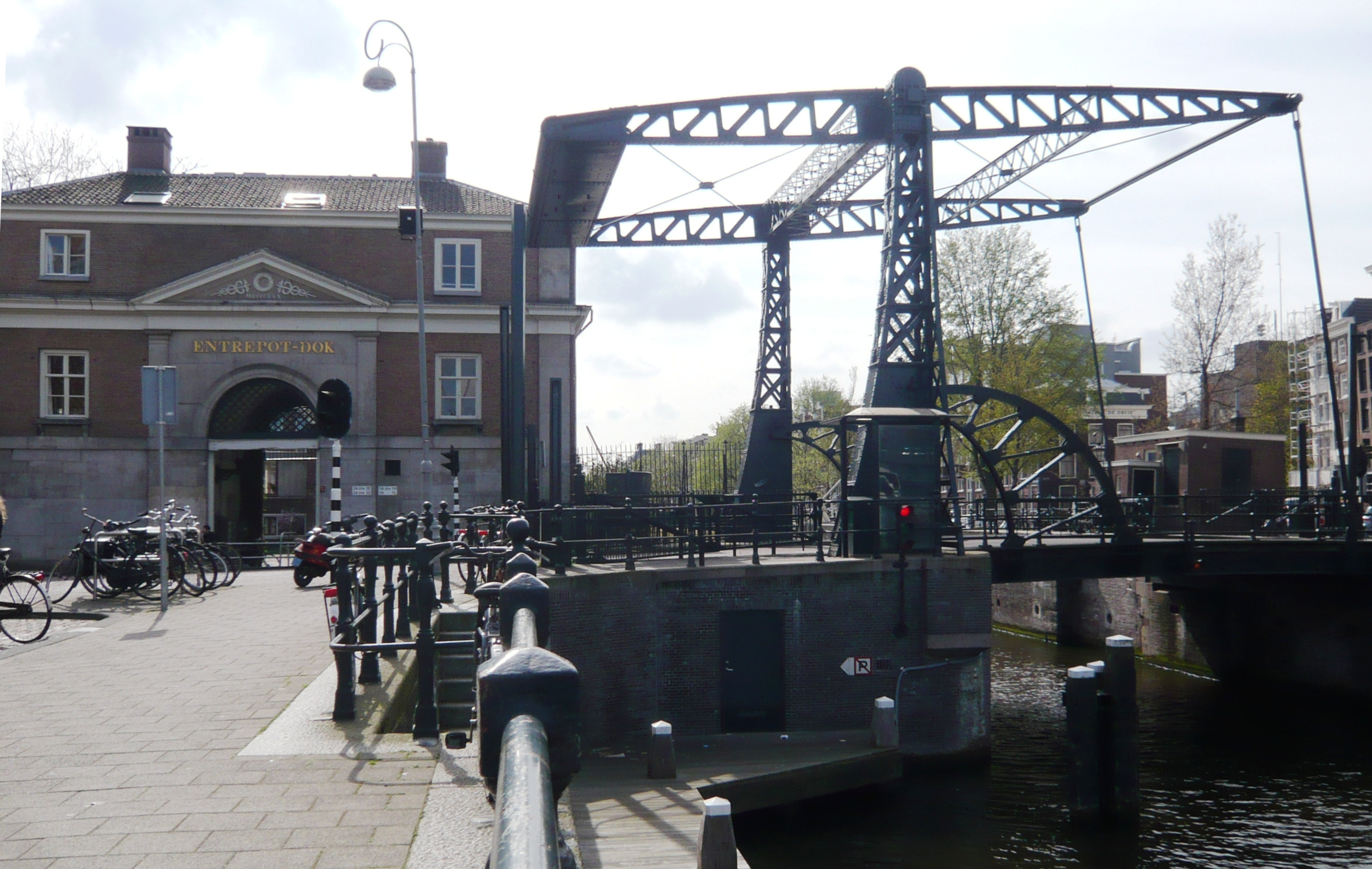
cast iron bascule bridge built in 1906 across the Nieuwe Herengracht in Amsterdam.

=== Rolling stock ===
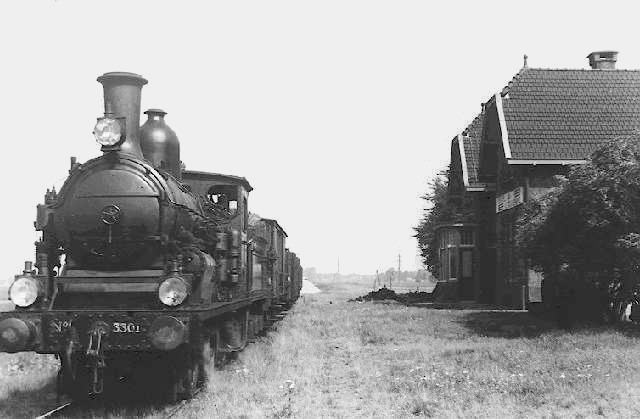
Steam locomotive NS 3301 (ex HSM 671).

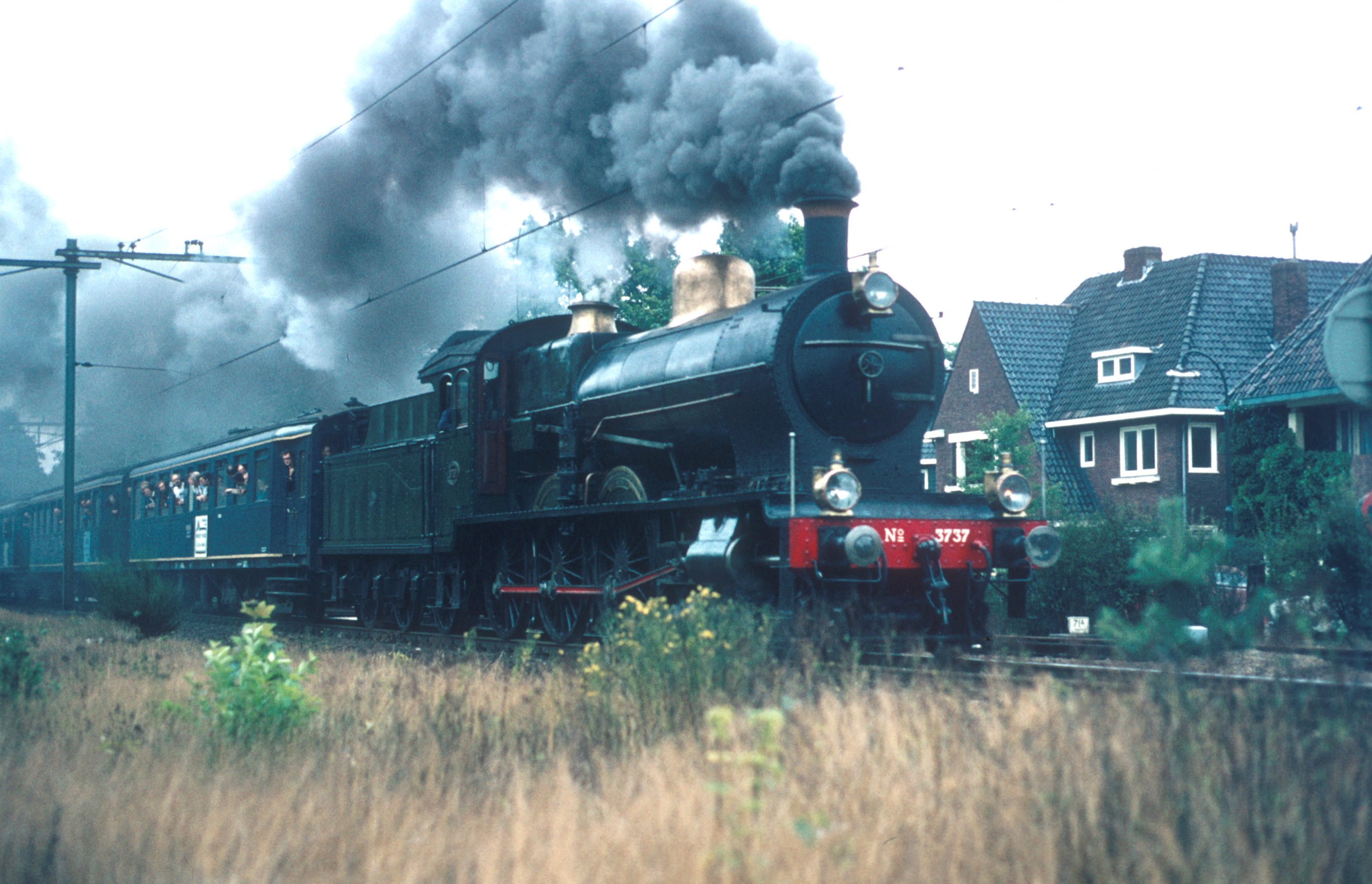
Steam locomotive NS 3737 (ex SS] 731).

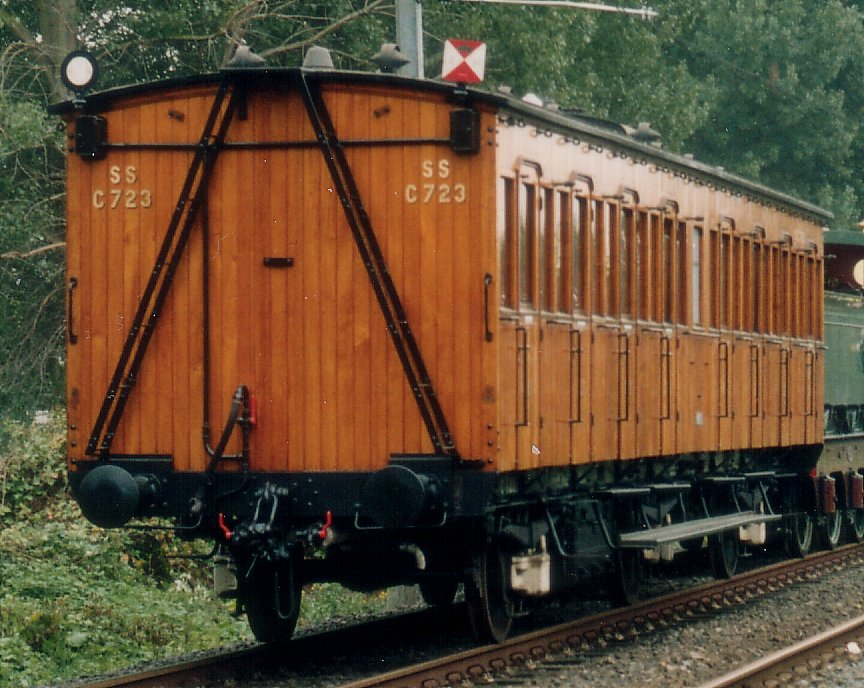
Railroad carriage SS C723.

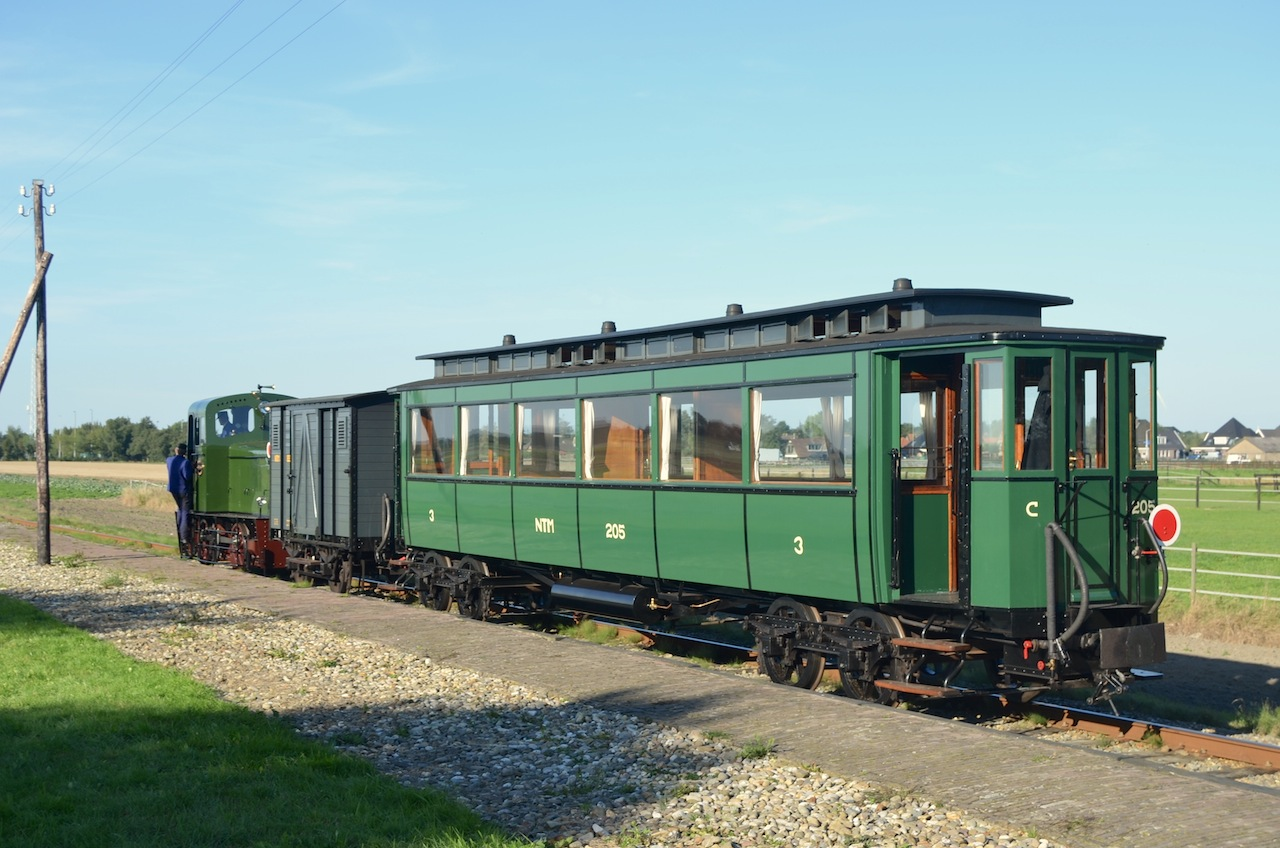
Tram enginecar Nederlandsche Tramweg Maatschappij (NTM) C205.

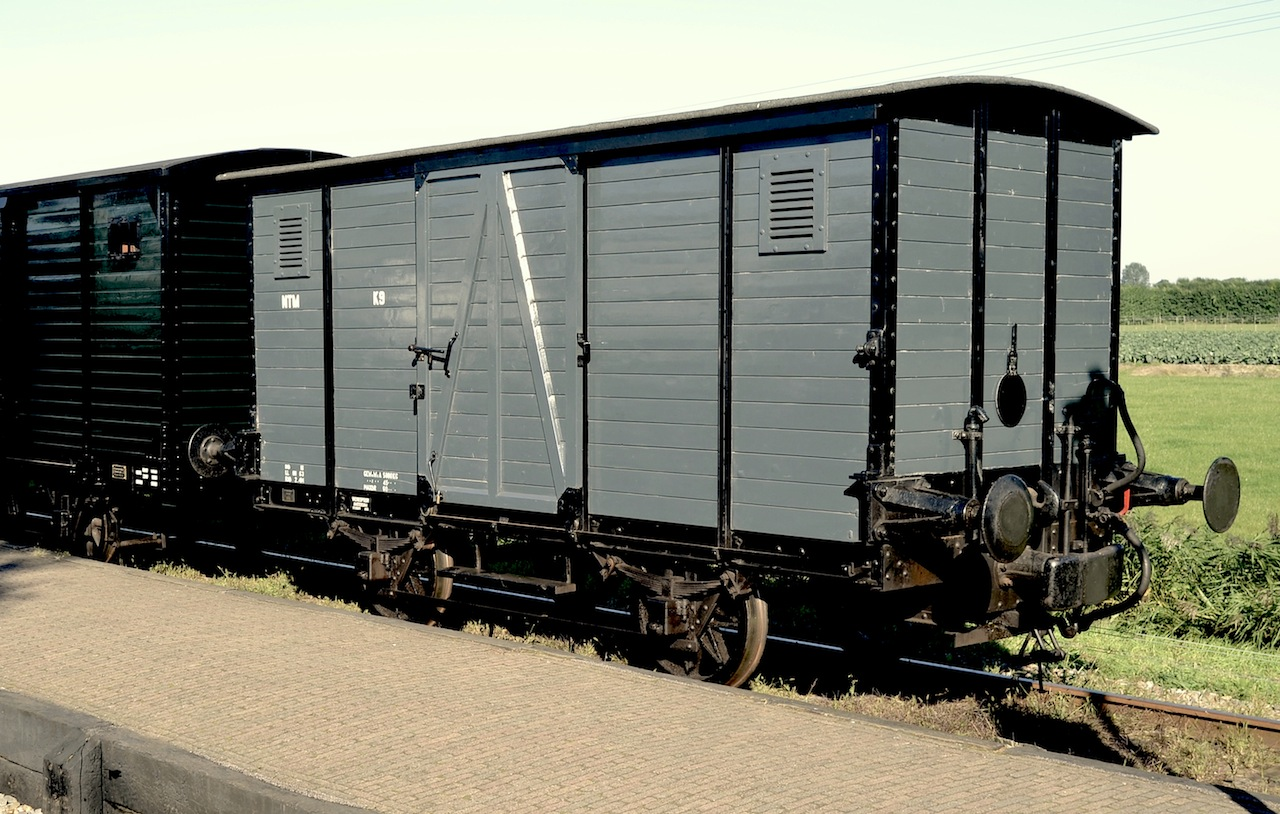
Cat NTM K9.

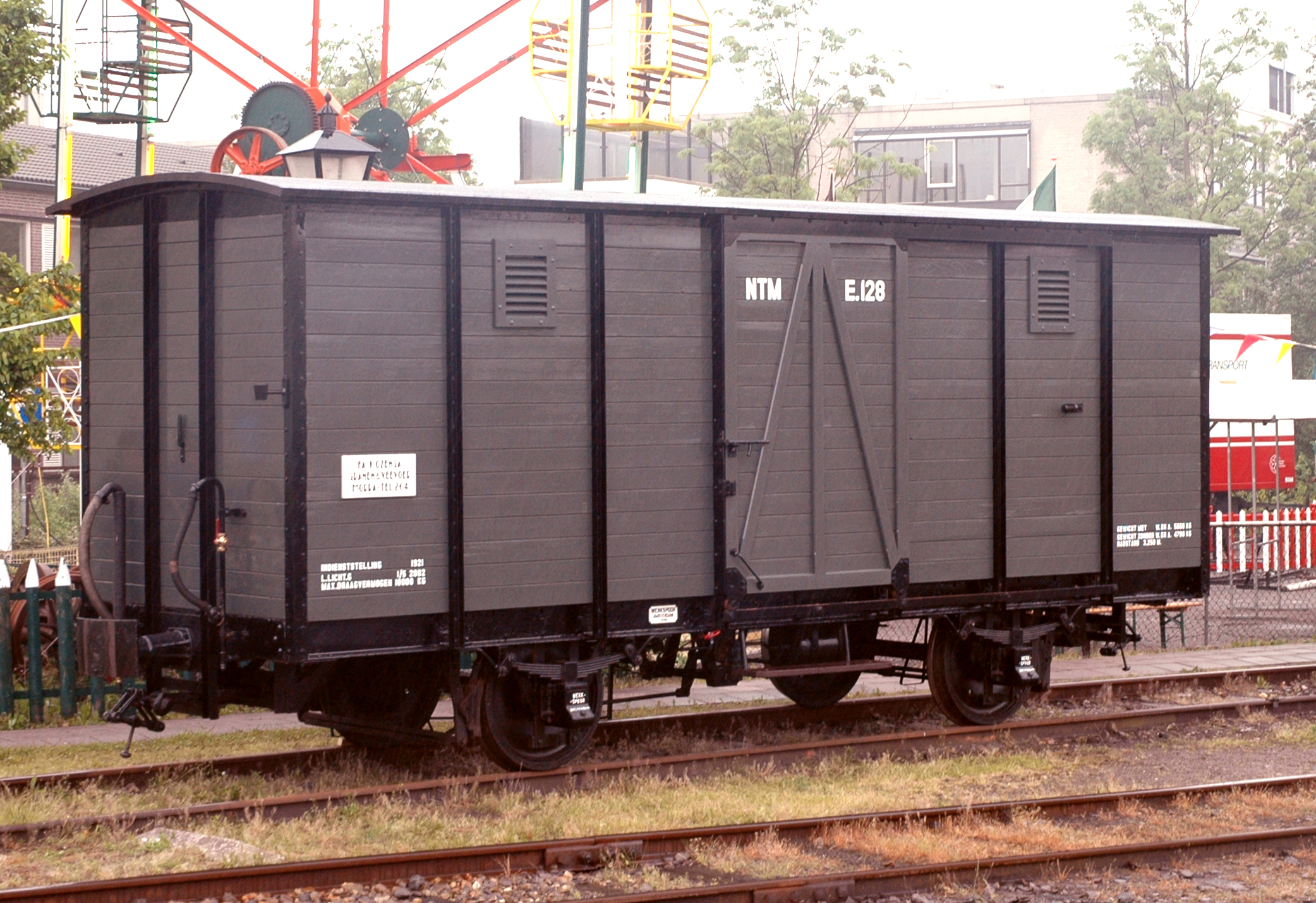
Cargo car NTM E128.

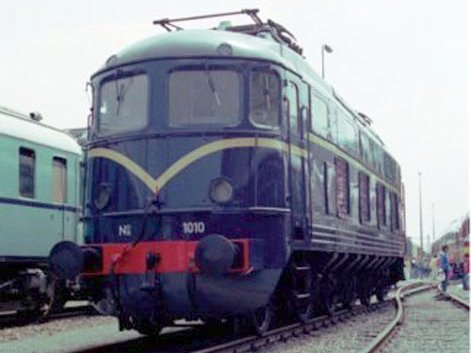
Electrical locomotive NS Class 1000.

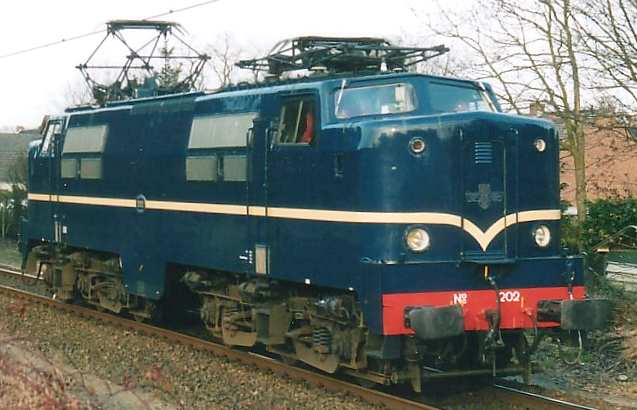
Electrical locomotive NS Class 1200.

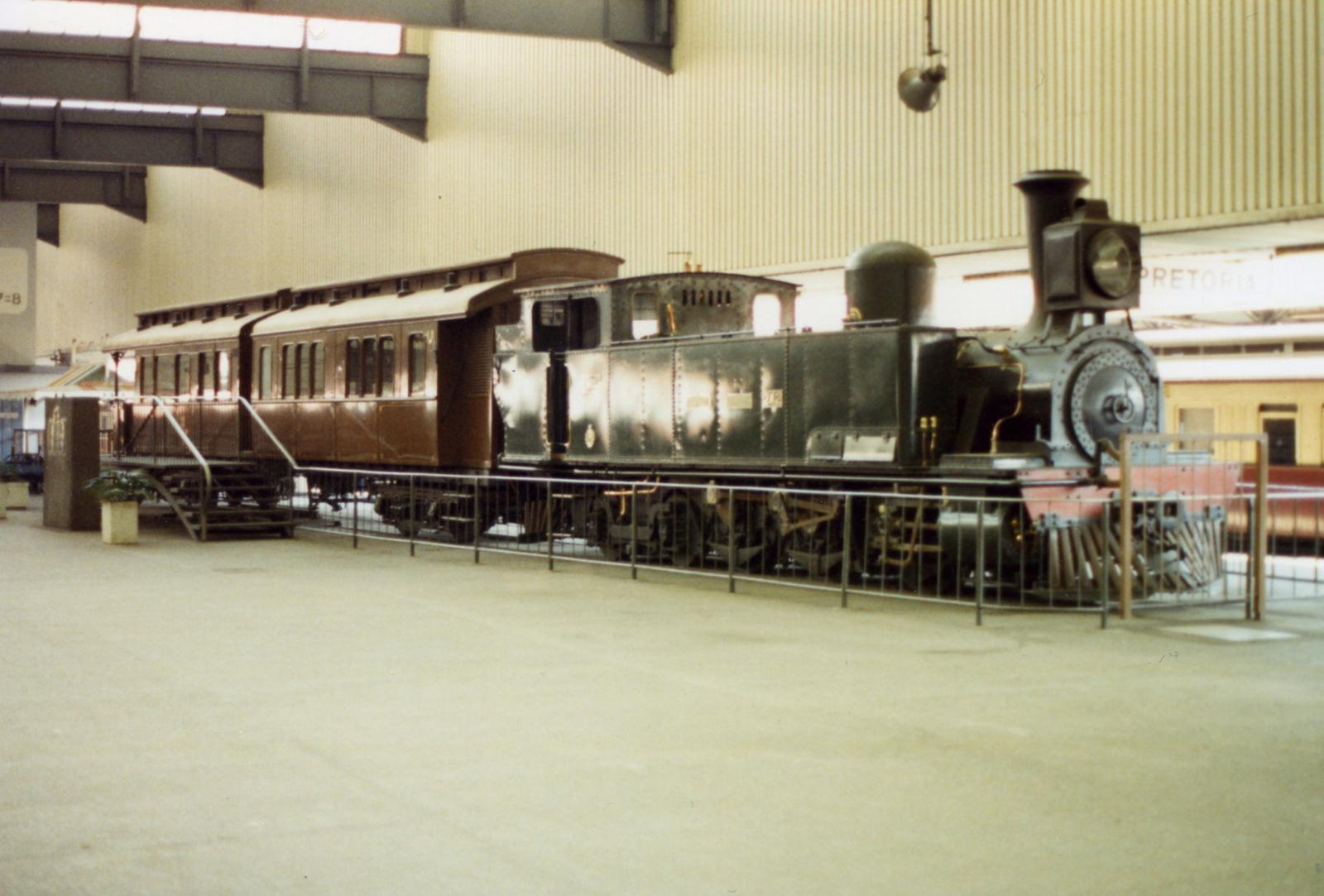
Steam Locomotive Class B (0-6-4T) nr. 236 of NZASM

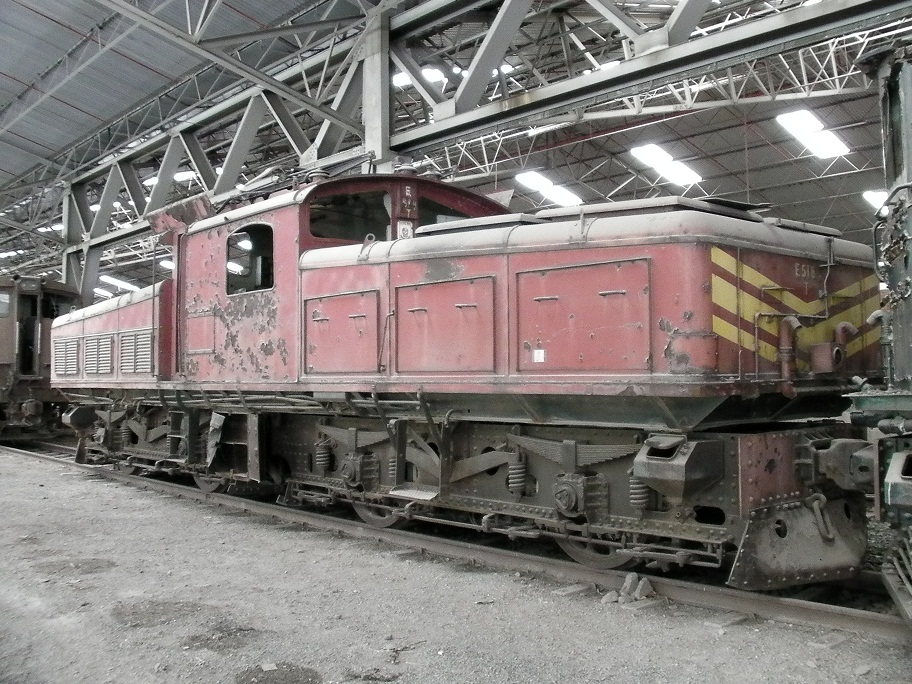
Electrical locomotive E518, South African Railways.

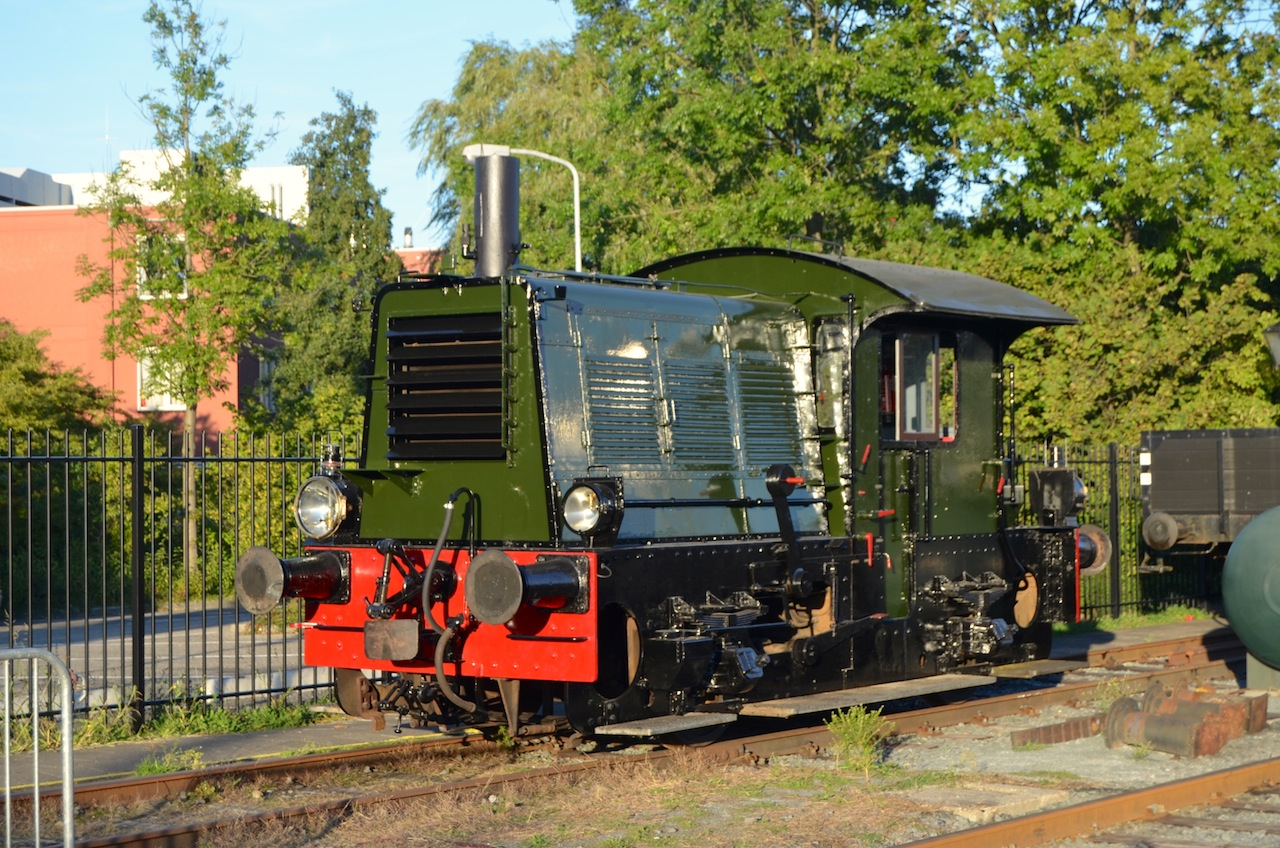
Locomotor NS 271.

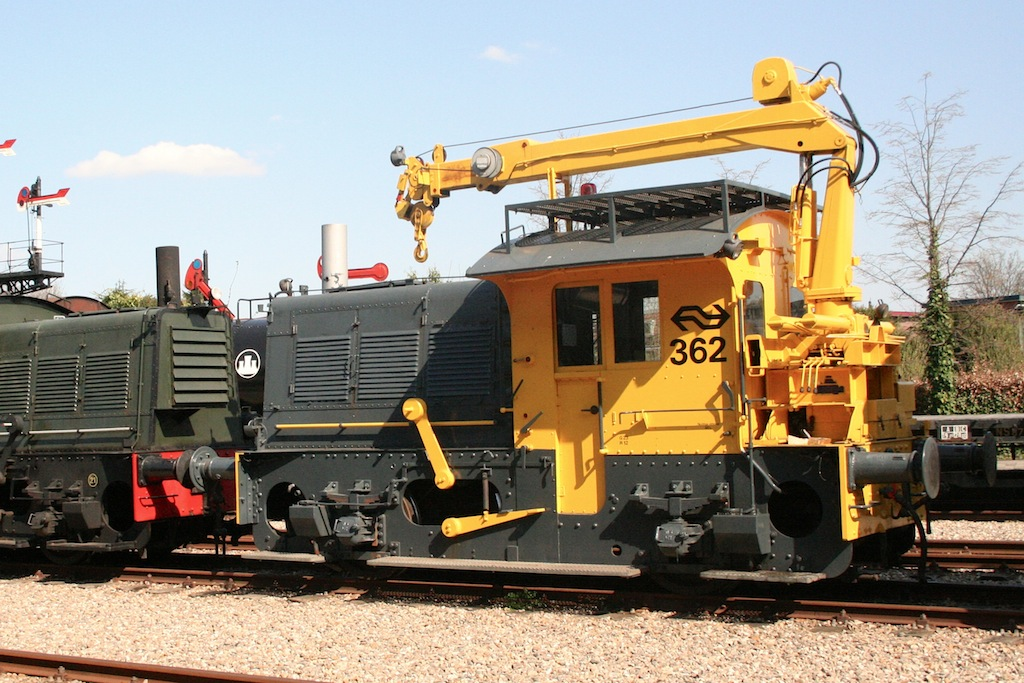
Locomotor NS 362.

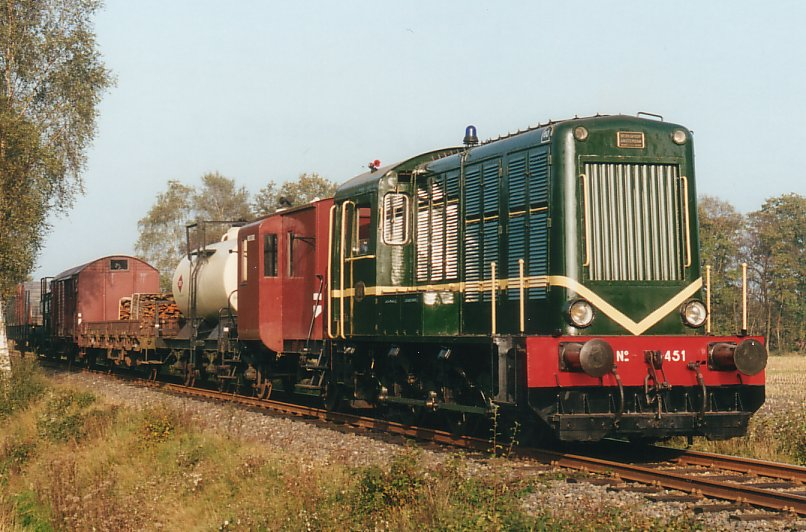
Diesel locomotive loc NS 451.

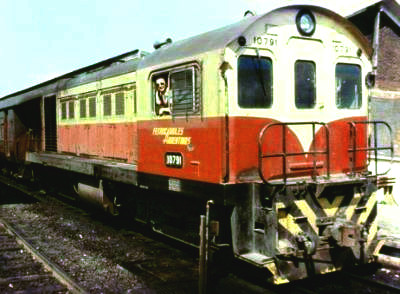
Diesel locomotive delivered to Argentina.

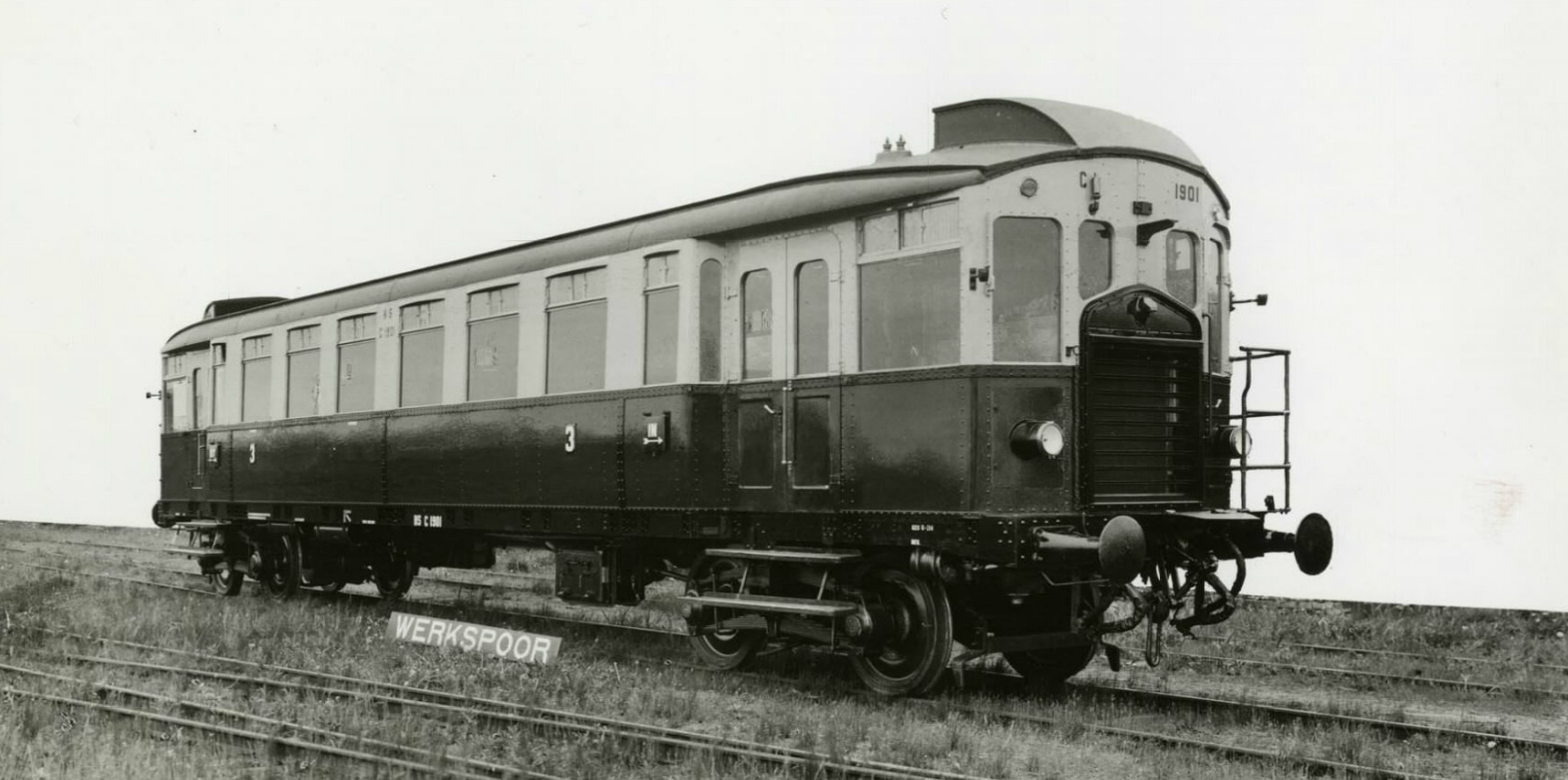
Railcar NS BC 1901.

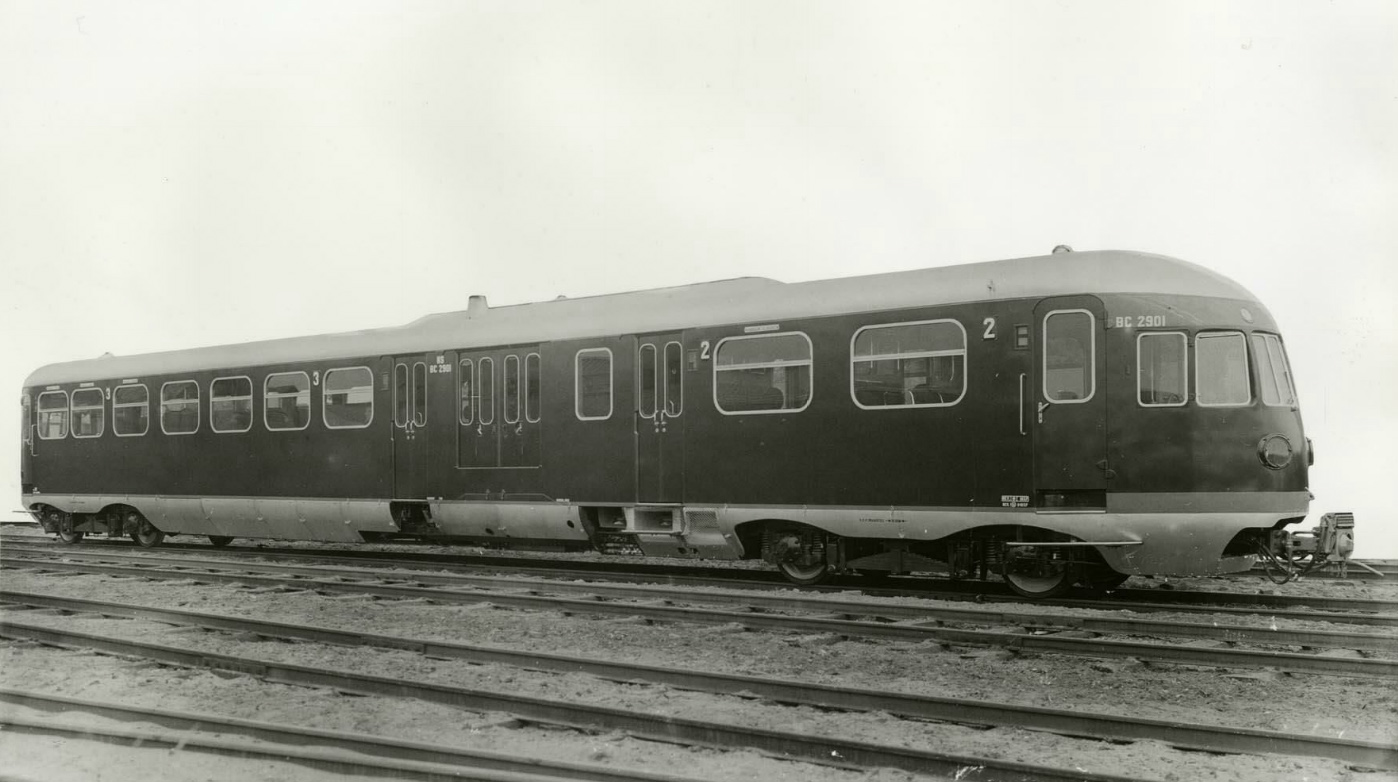
Railcar NS BC 2901.

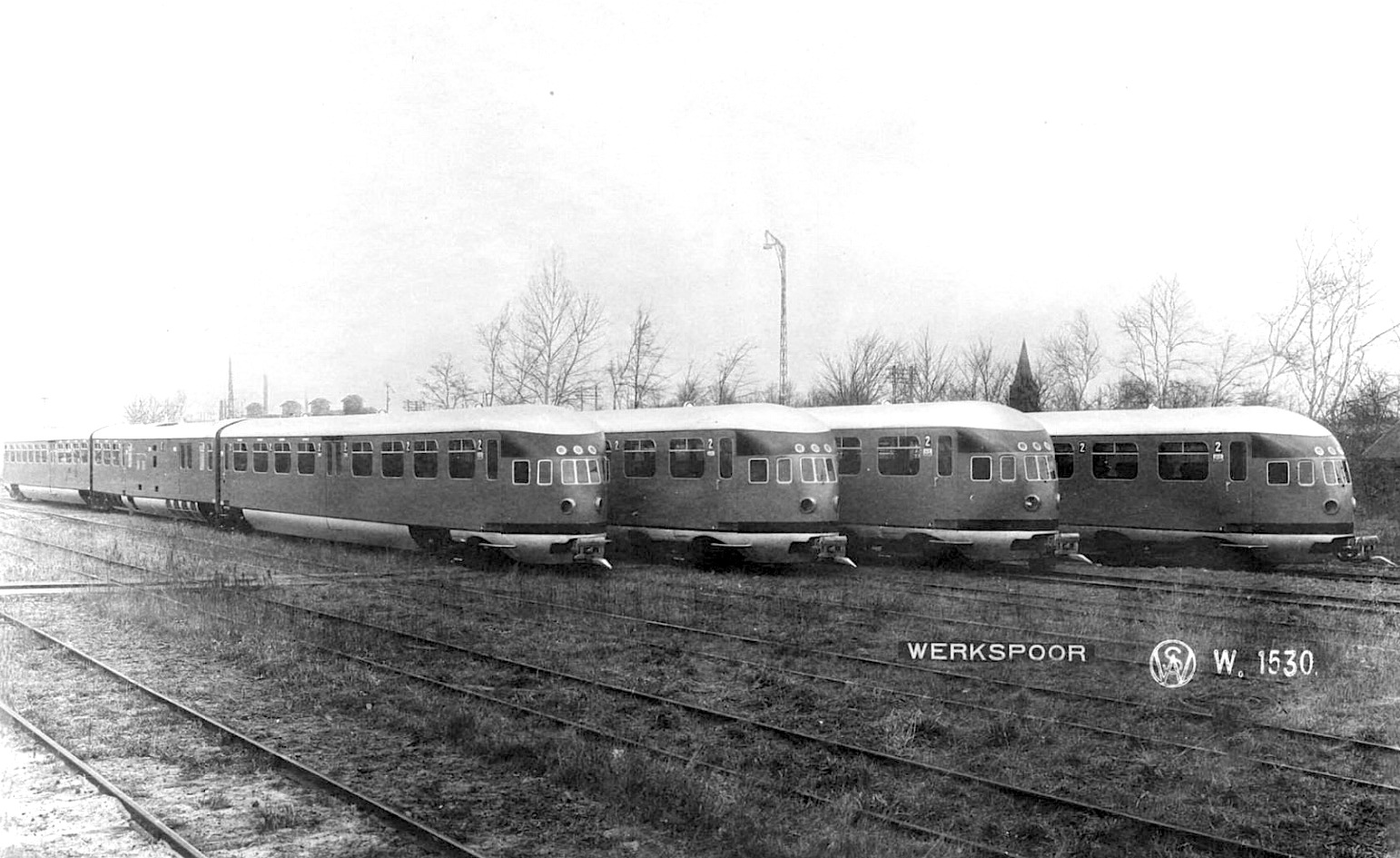
Dieseldrieën before delivery to NS on the Werkspoor terrain in 1934.

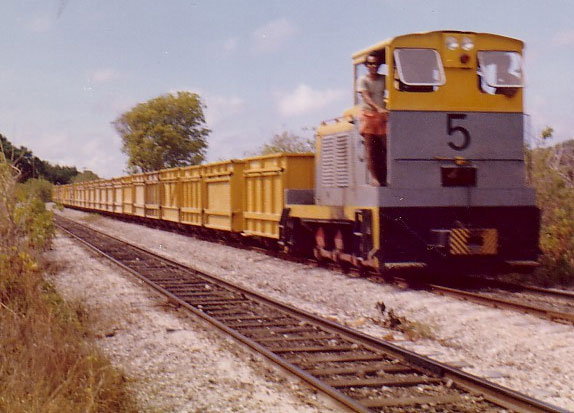
Rolling stock for Nauru phosphate railway

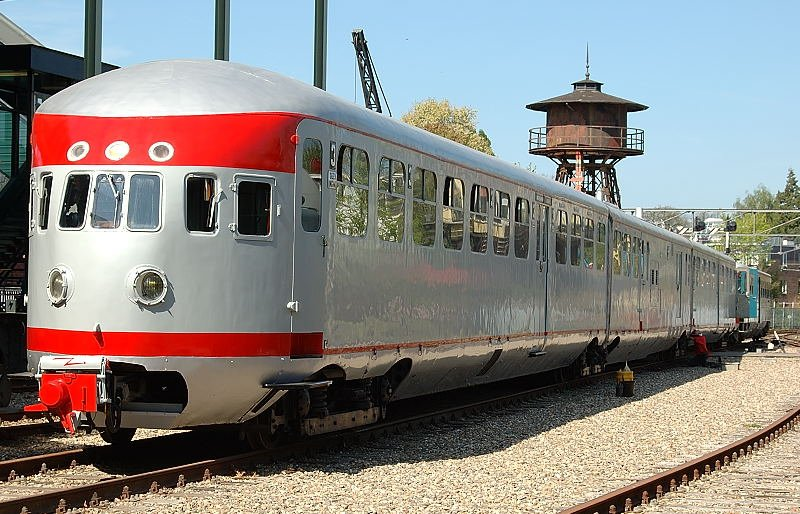
Dieseldrie NS 27.

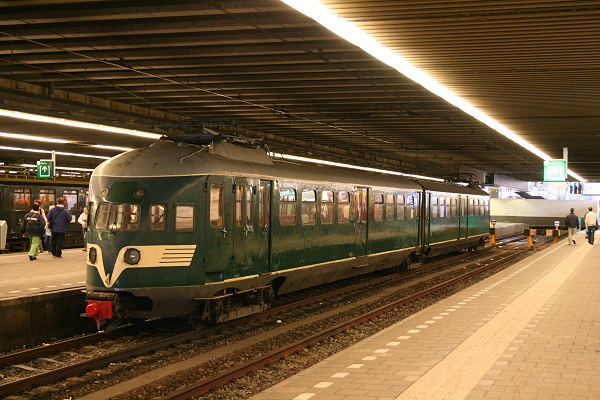
Electric two car trainset NS 252.

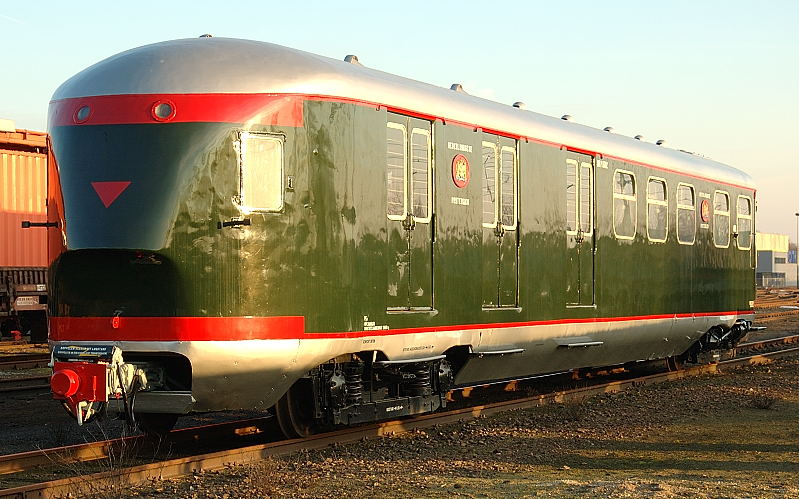
streamlined post car NS Pec 8502.

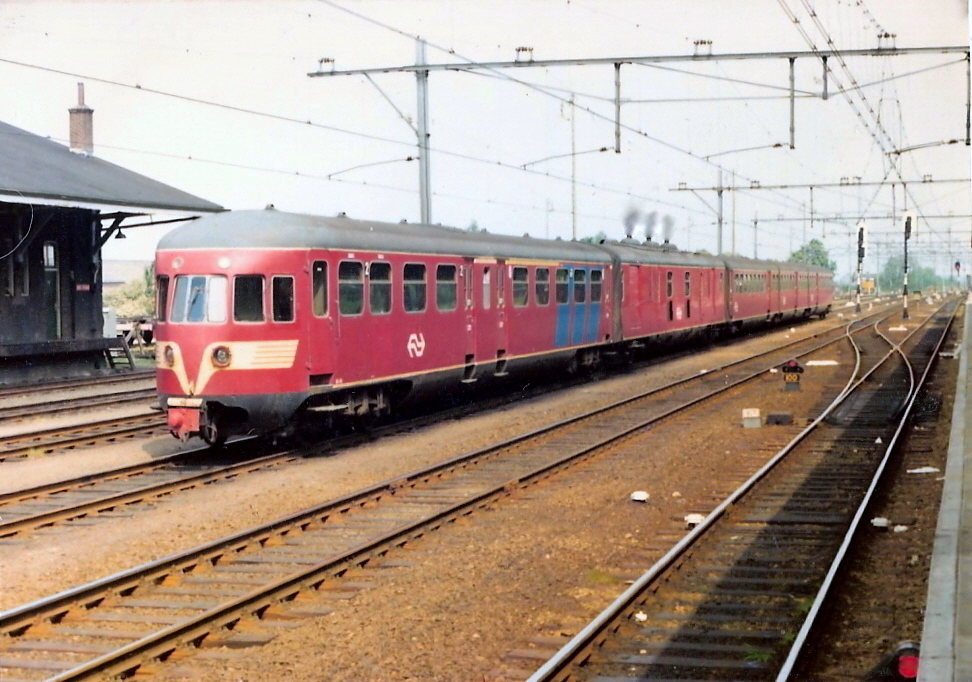
five car diesel trainset in Geldermalsen.

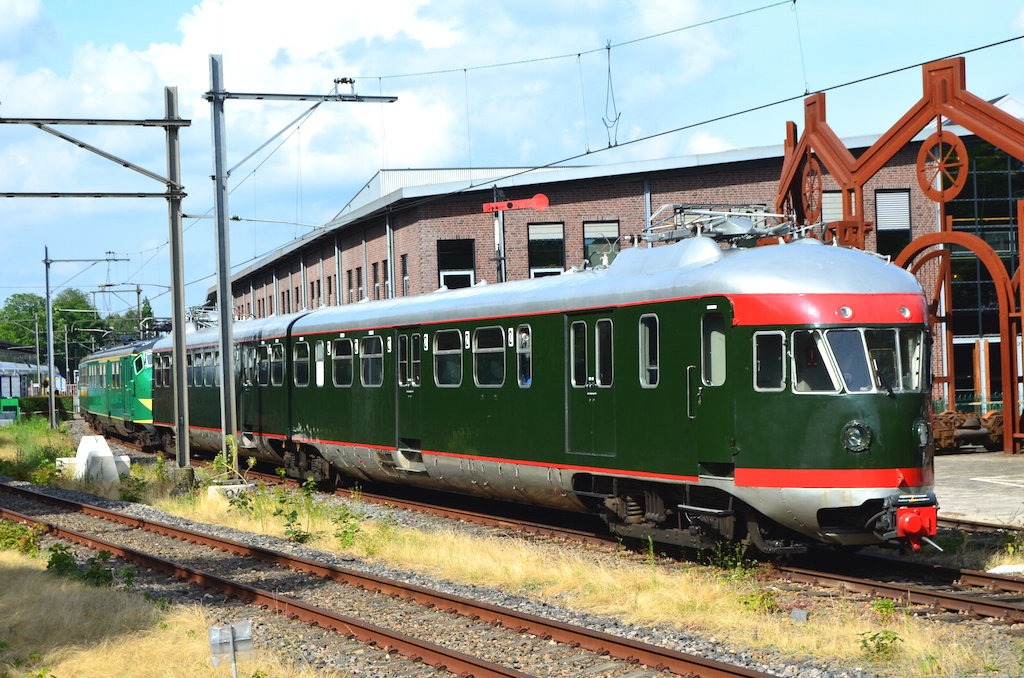
Mat '46 electric two car trainset NS 273.

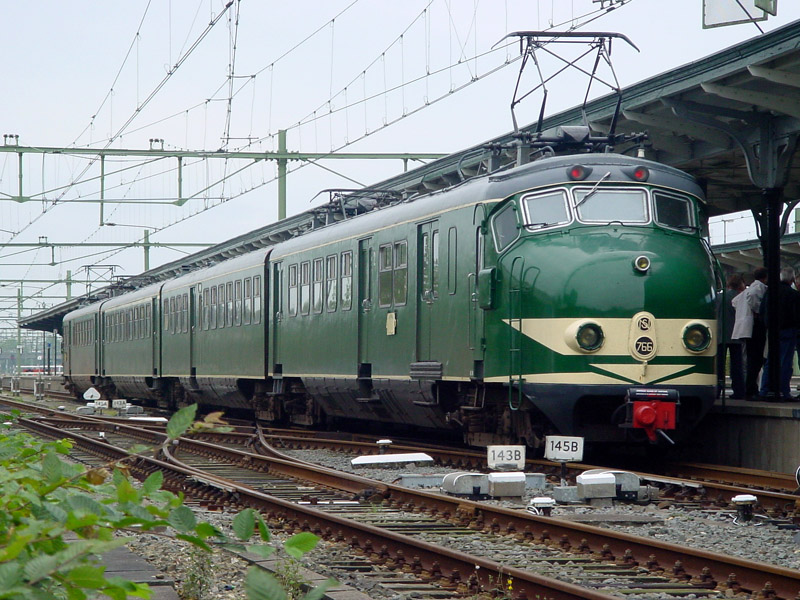
Mat '54 electric four car trainset NS 766.

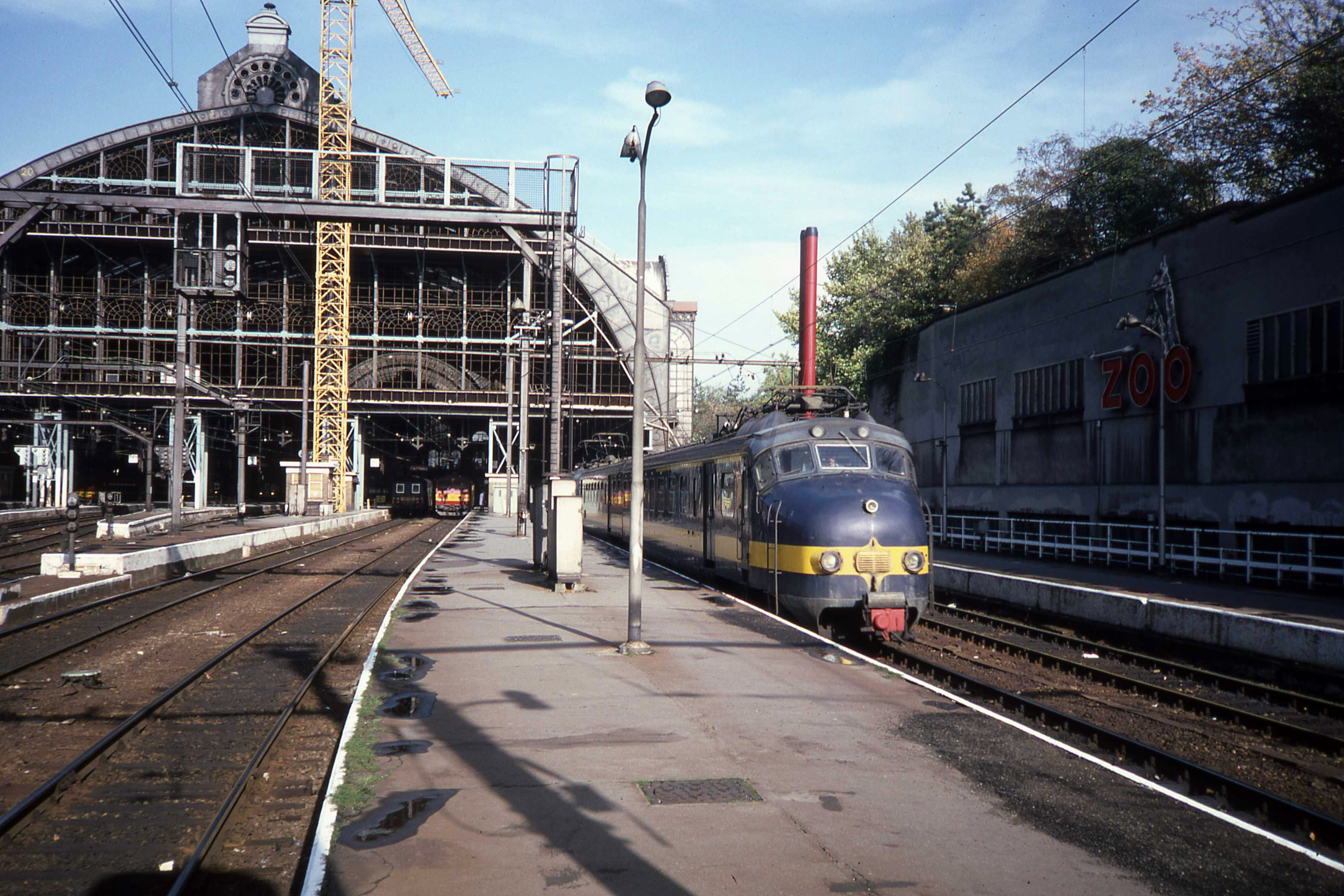
Mat '57 Benelux train electric two car trainset in Antwerpen Centraal.

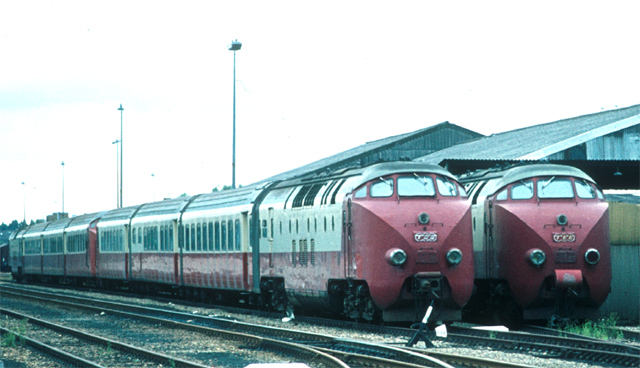
Motorcars for Dutch-Swiss TEE-trainset.

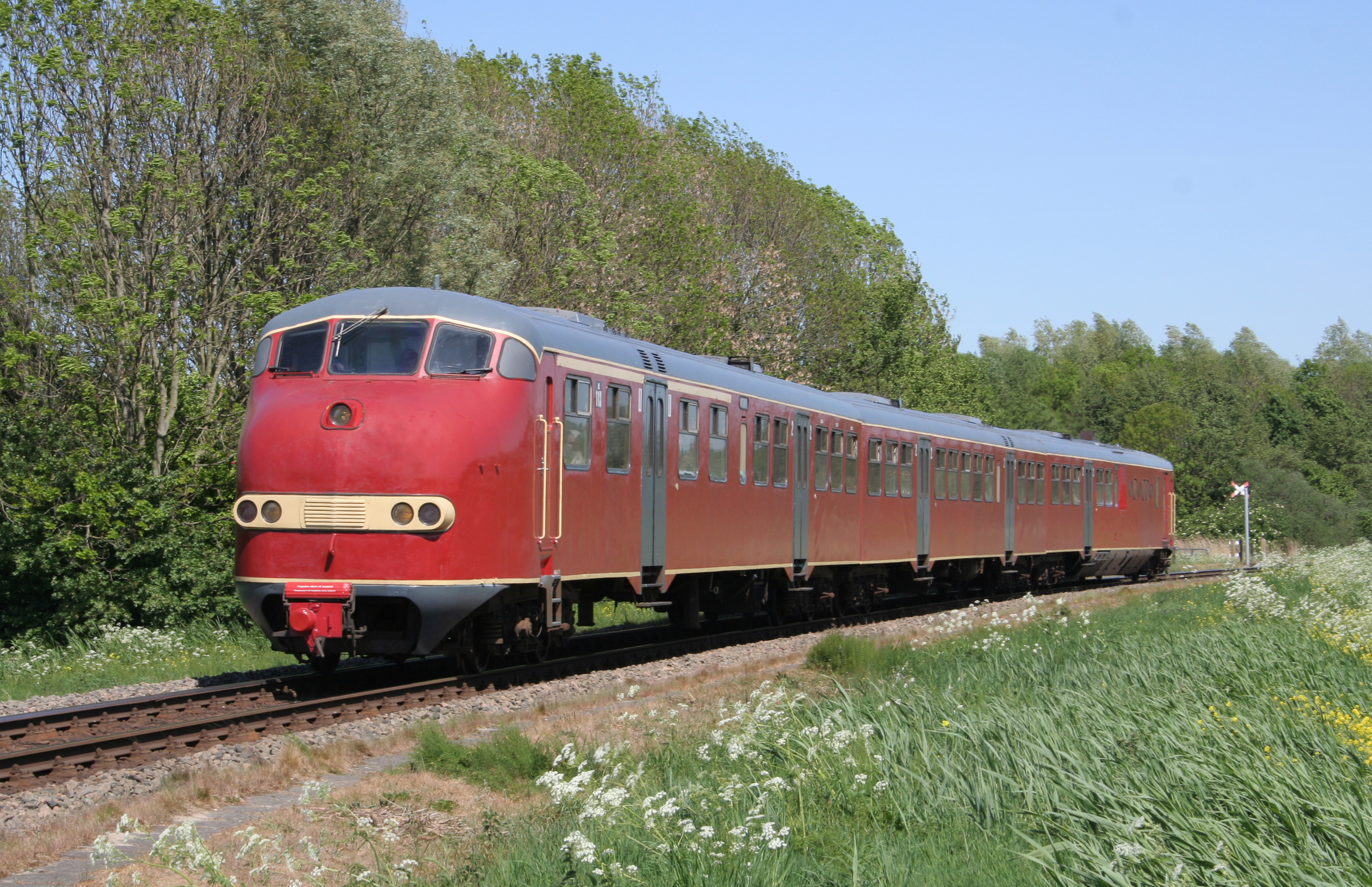
Diesel-Electric trainset NS Plan U.

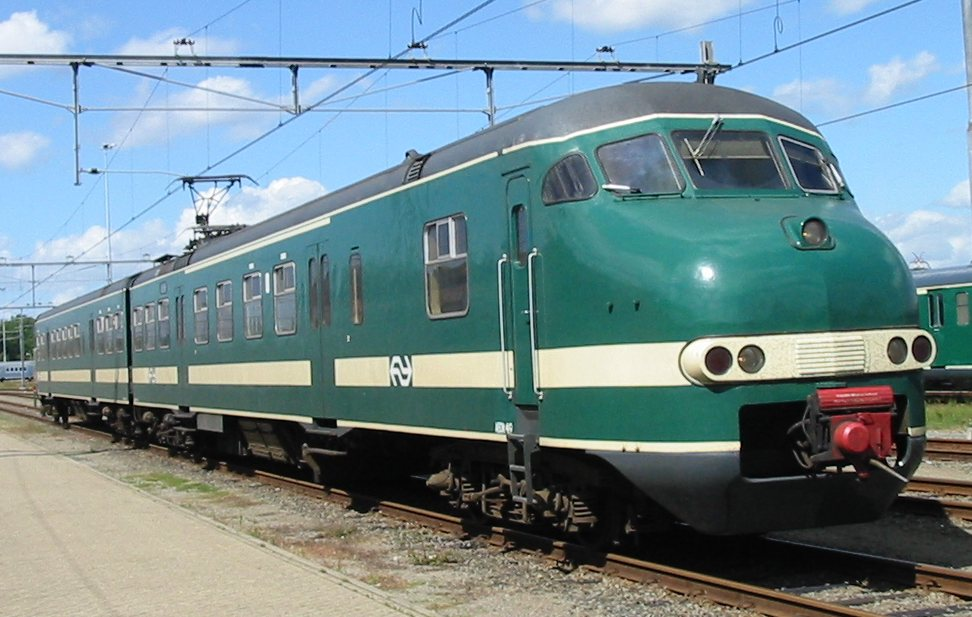
Mat '64 electric two car trainset NS Plan V 419.

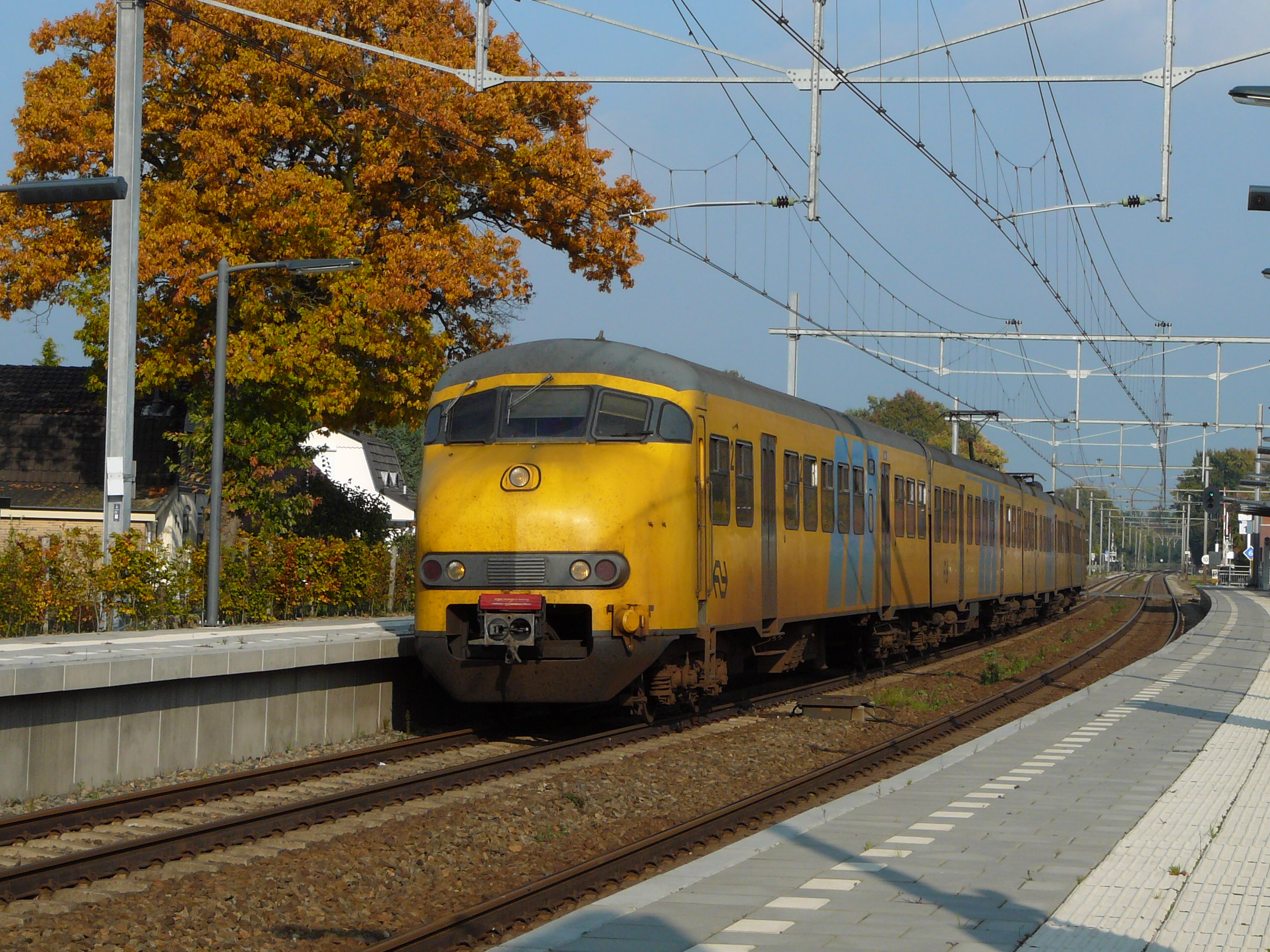
Mat '64 electric four car trainset NS Plan T 522.

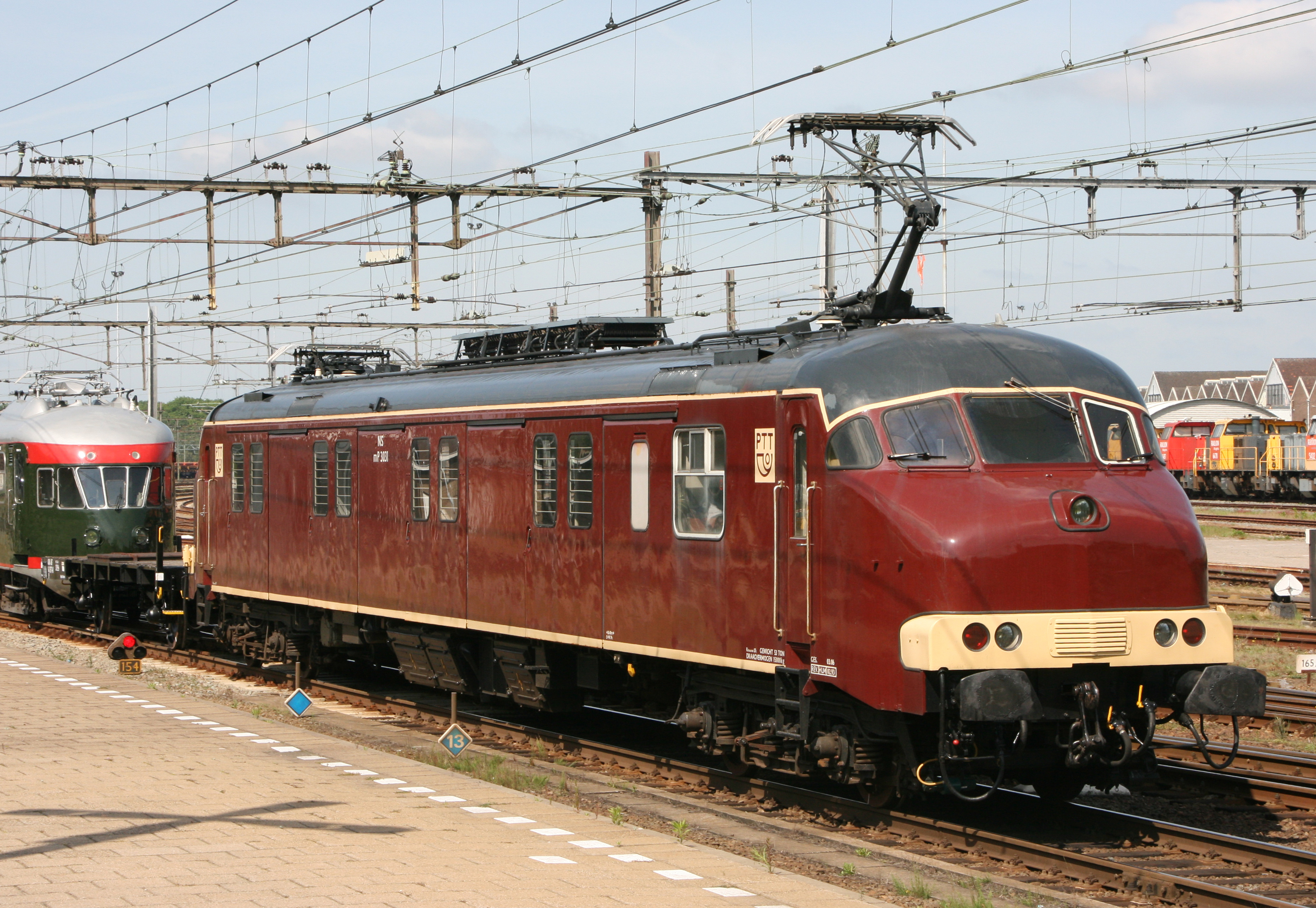
Motorpost mP 3031.

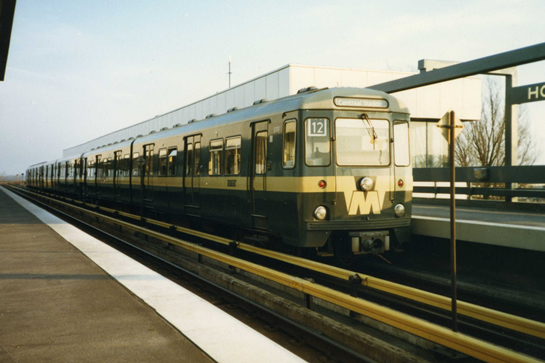
Rotterdam Metro Metrotype M.

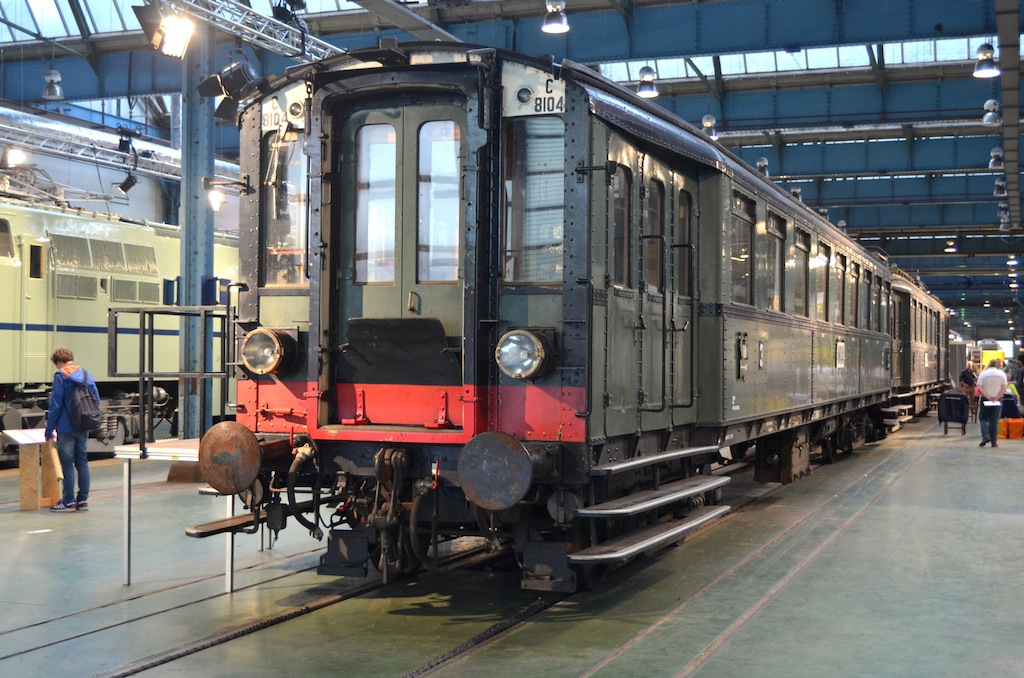
Blokkendoosrijtuig (Mat '24), steering car NS C 8104.

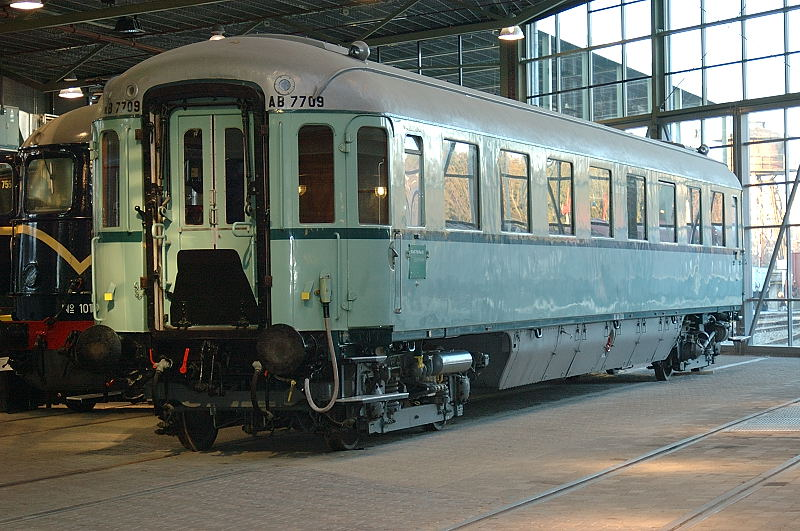
Rail carriage Plan D NS AB 7709.

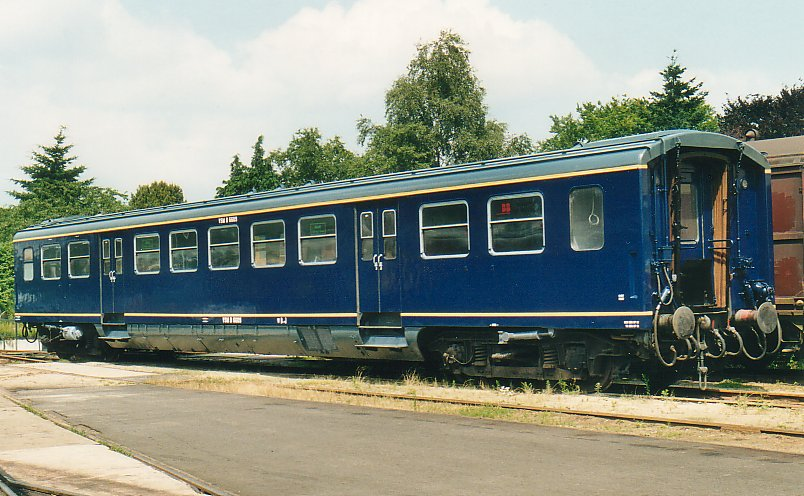
Rail carriage Plan E NS C 6703.

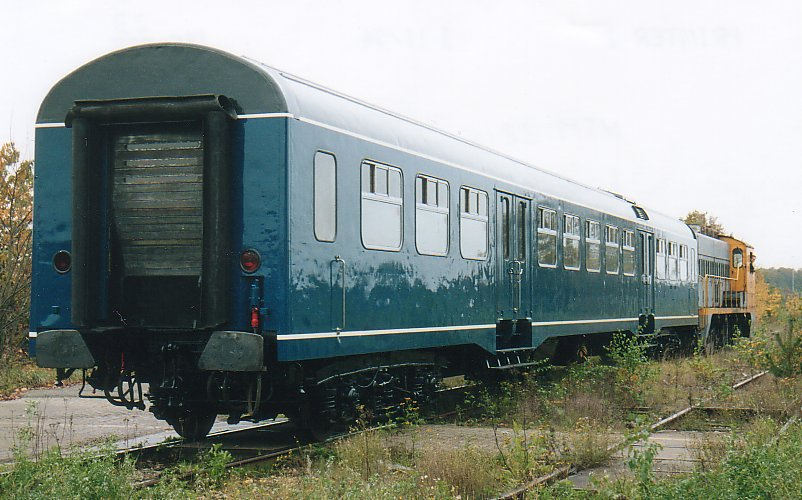
Rail carriage Plan W, NS B 4118.

=== Trams ===
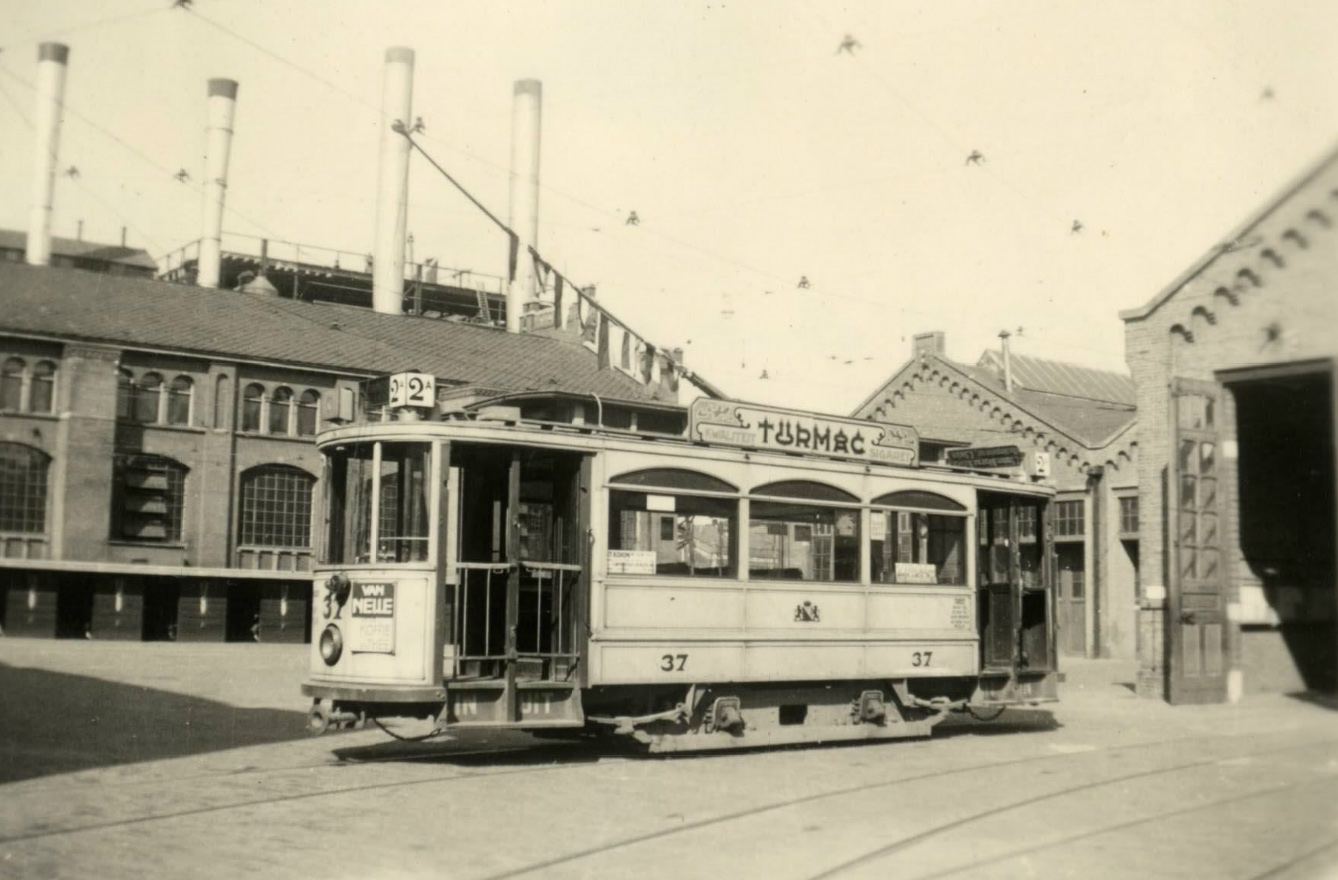
Tram motorcar 37 built 1908 for Gemeentetram Utrecht.

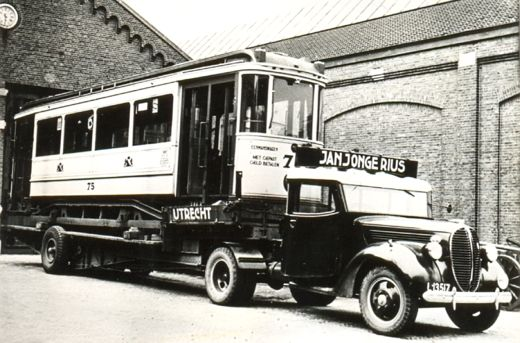
Motorcar 75 built 1927 for Gemeentetram Utrecht.

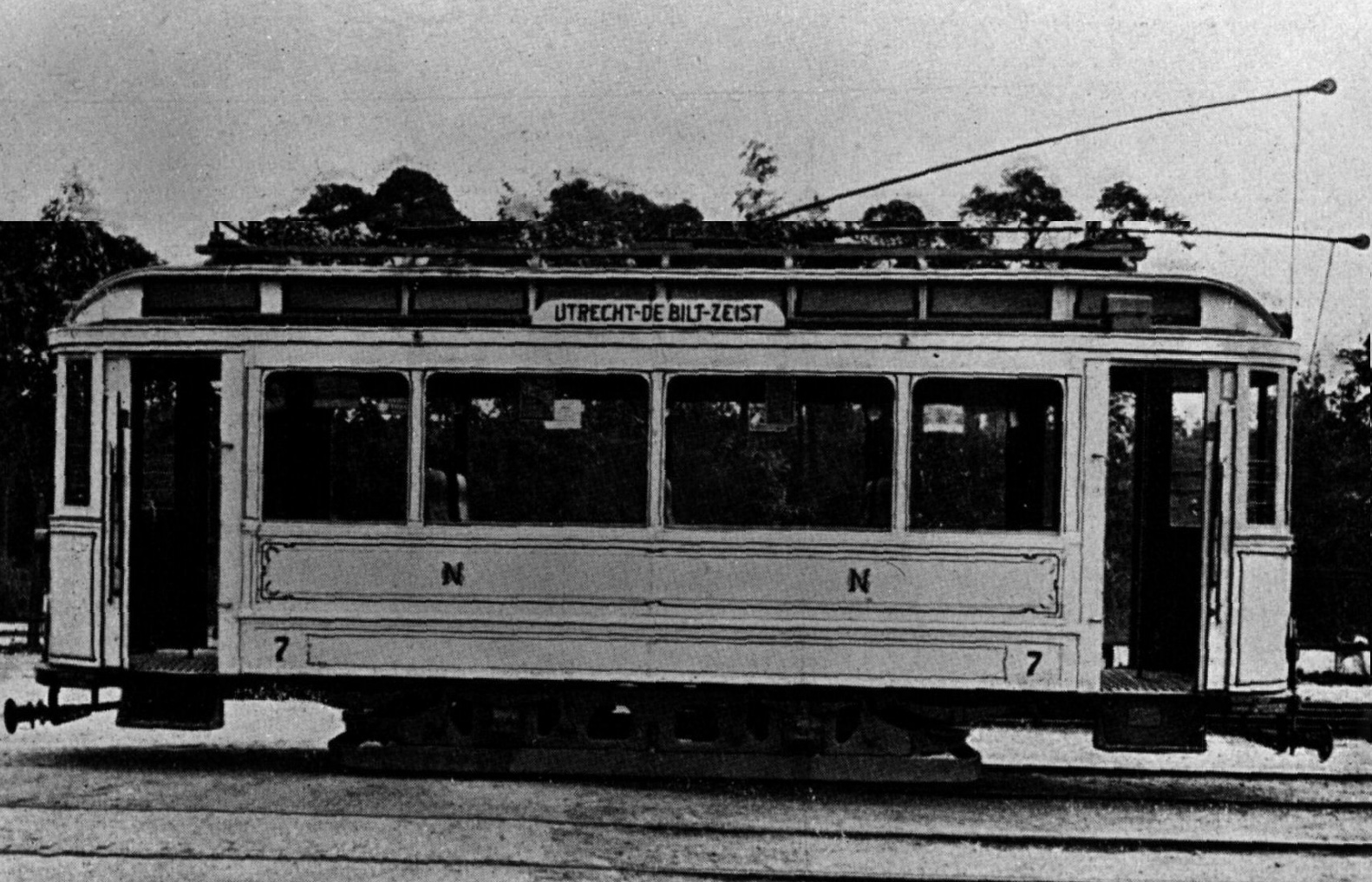
Motorcar 7 built 1909 for tram road Utrecht-Zeist.

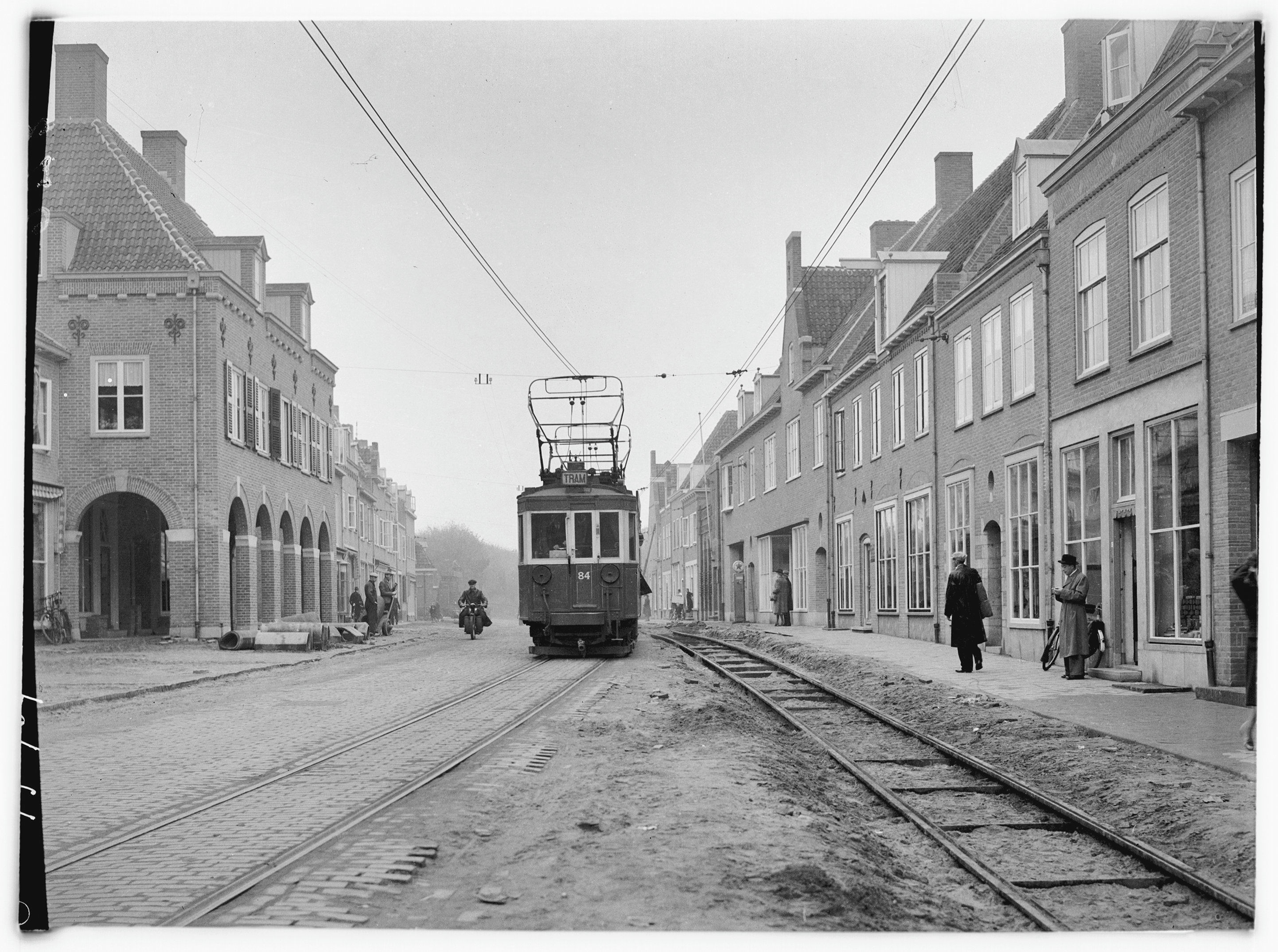
Motorcar 84 built 1924 for tram road Amersfoort - Arnhem.

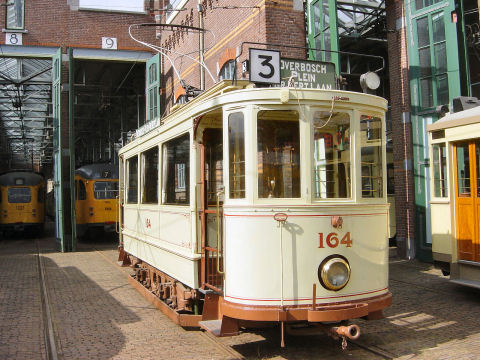
The Hague tramways motorcar 164 built 1907.

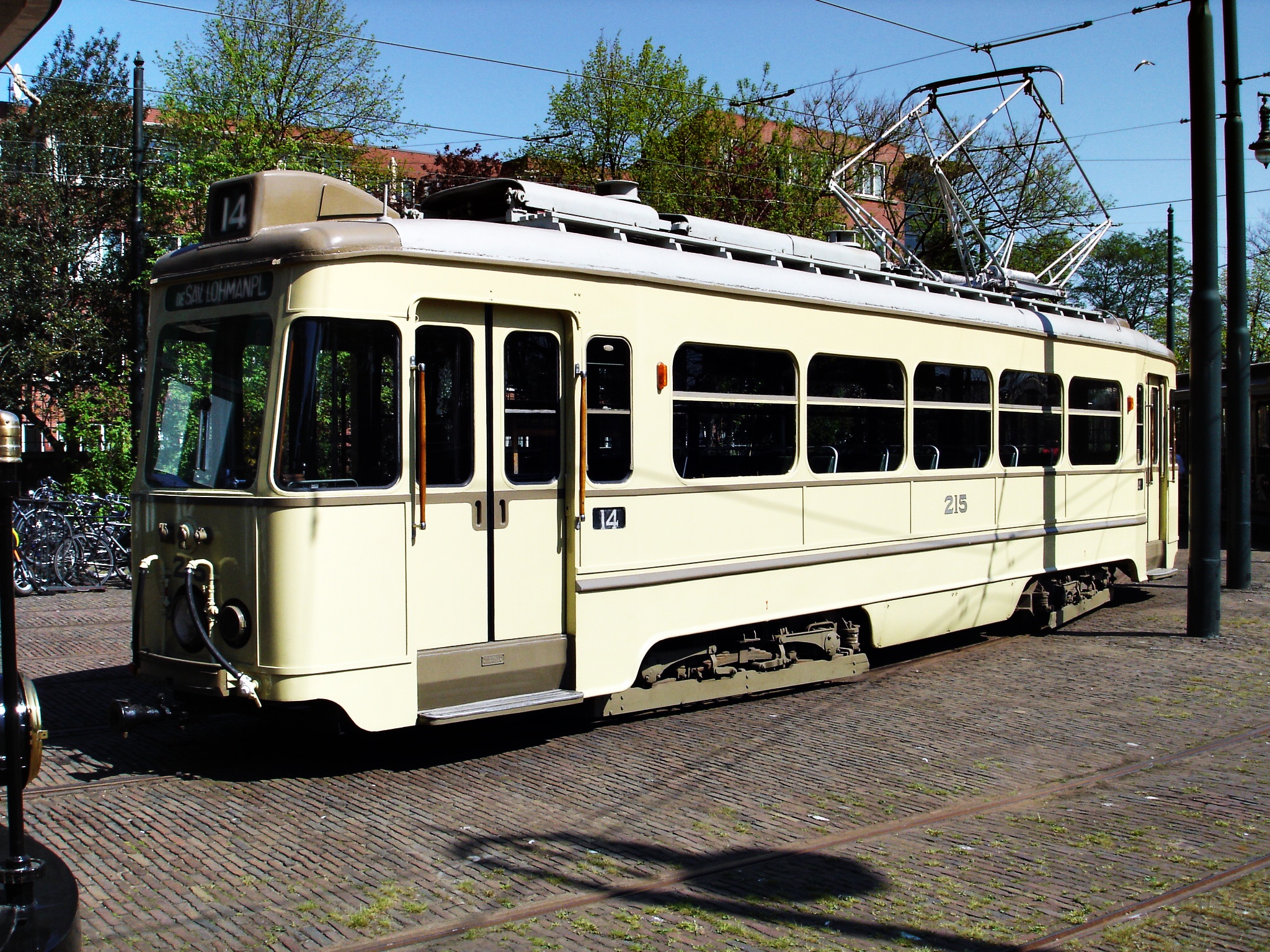
Haagse vierasser 215 built 1949.

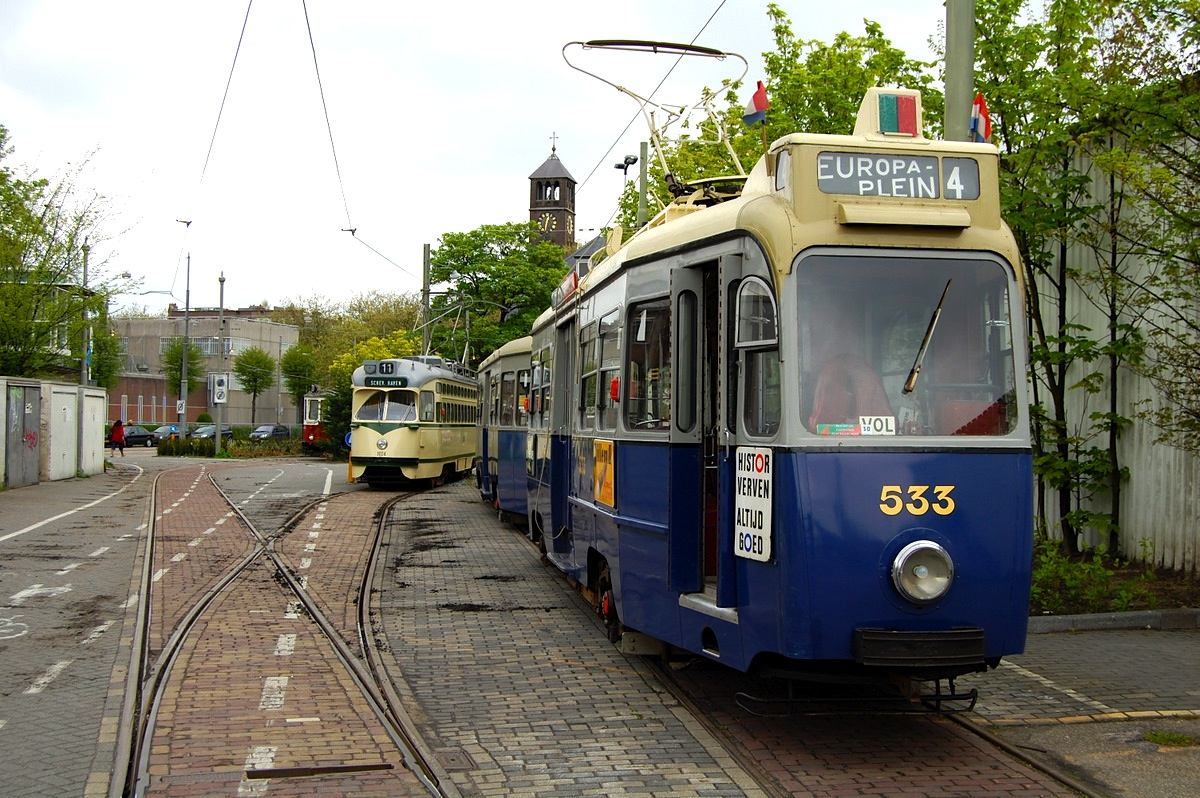
Amsterdam drieasser 533 built 1950.

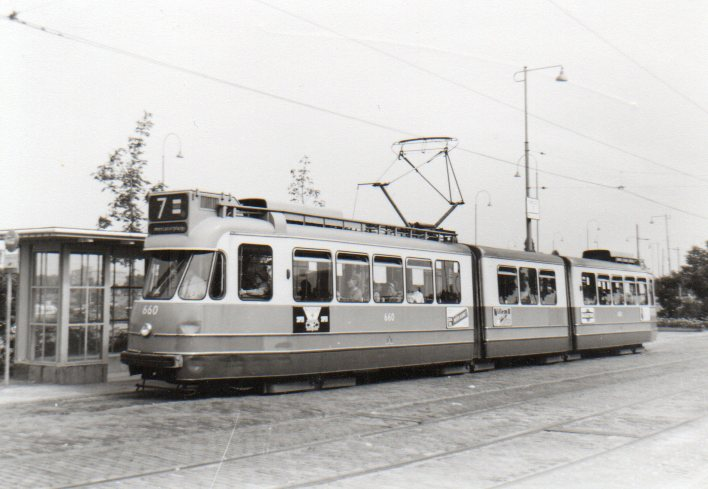
Amsterdamse dubbelgelede tram 660 (series 5G) built 1964.

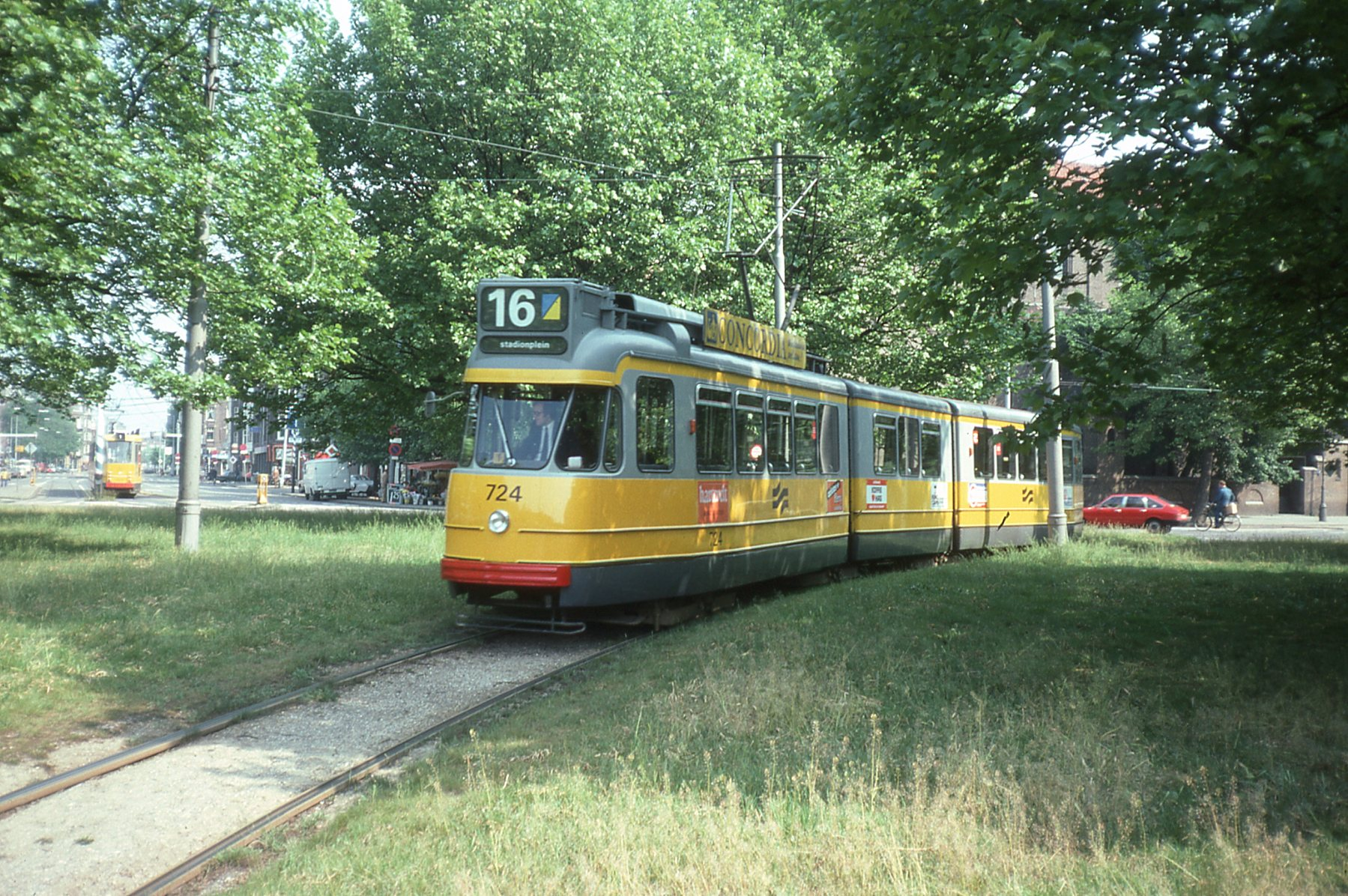
Amsterdams dubbelgelede tram 724 (series 7G) built 1968.

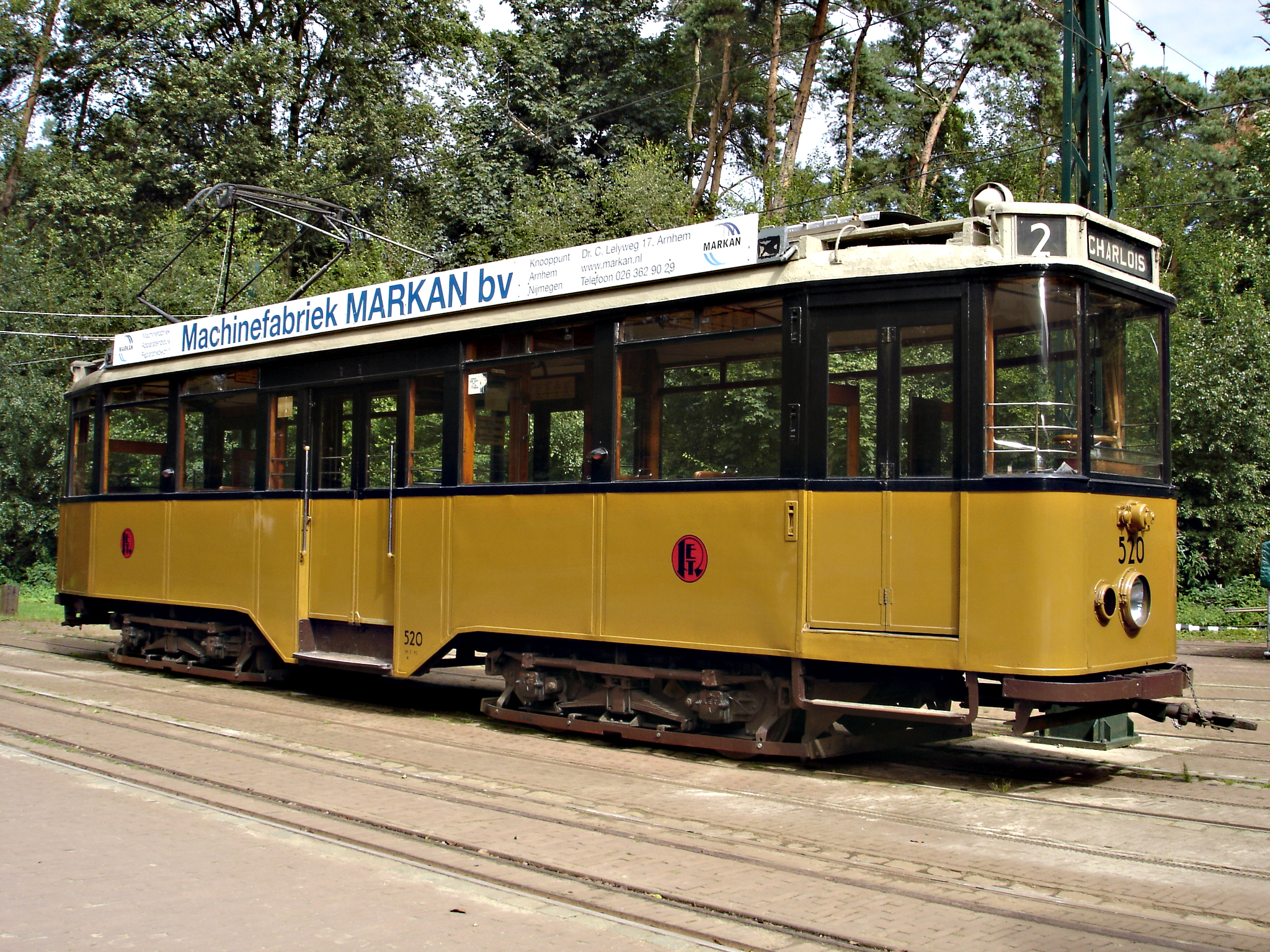
RET motorwagen 520 built year 1931 (serie 511-550 built by Werkspoor).

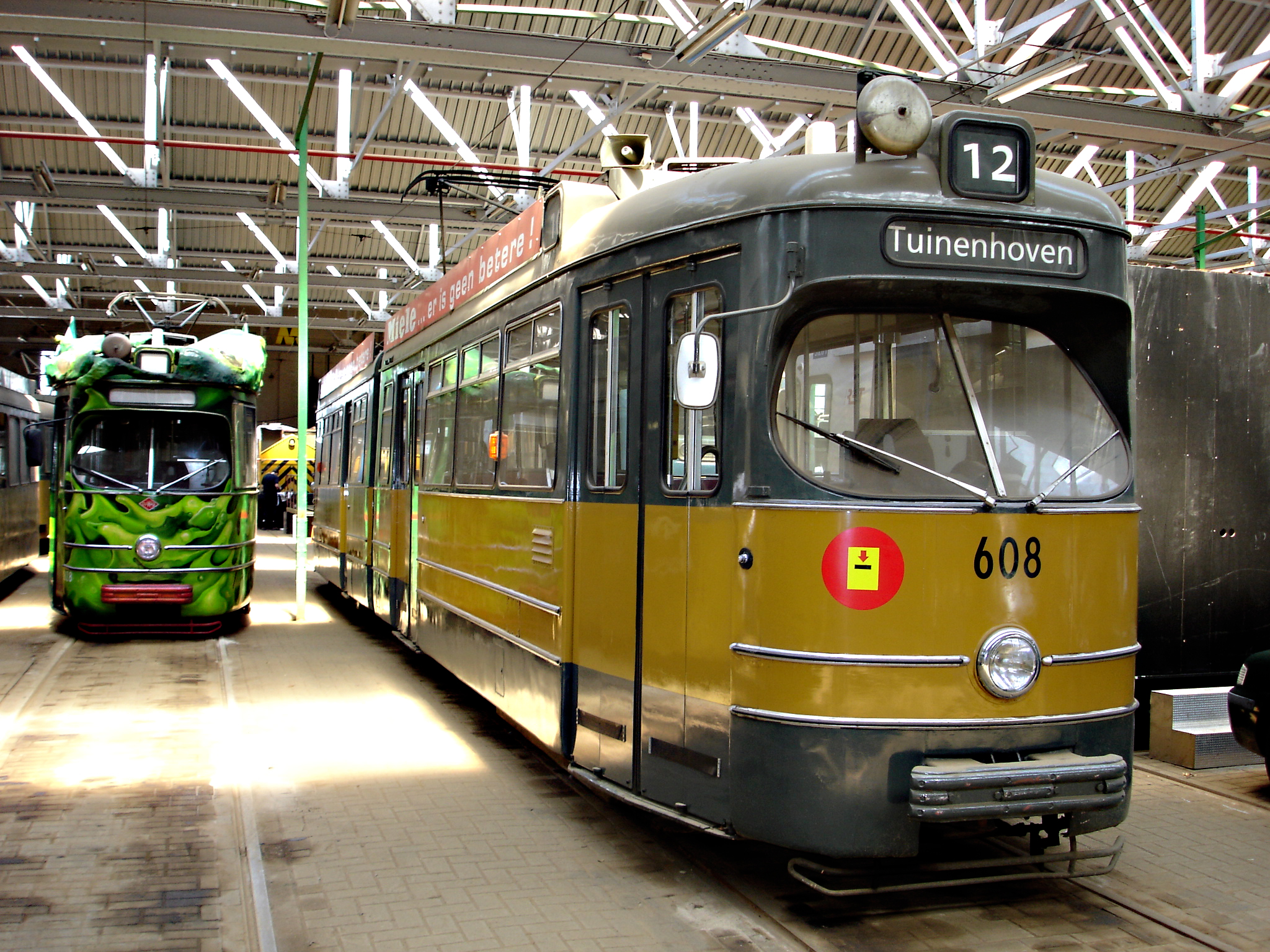
Rotterdams Düwag tram nr. 608 built 1969.
