= Wim van der Leegte =

Dutch businessman (1947–2023)

- Born: Wilhelmus Gerardus Stephanus Maria van der Leegte; 23 August 1947; Nuenen, Netherlands
- Died: 19 November 2023 (aged 76); Duizel, Netherlands
- Title: President, VDL Groep
- Term: 1966–2016
- Children: 3

Wilhelmus Gerardus Stephanus Maria van der Leegte (23 August 1947 – 19 November 2023) was a Dutch billionaire businessman, and the owner of Netherlands-based VDL Groep.

== Early life and career ==
Wim van der Leegte was born in Nuenen on 23 August 1947.

VDL Groep, one of Europe's largest privately held car and bus makers, was founded in 1953 by his father Pieter van der Leegte, when it started making parts for trucking companies.

In January 2016, VDL announced that Van der Leegte would be step down in November, after 44 years as a president since 1972.

== Personal life and death ==
Van der Leegte was married with three children and lived in Eindhoven, Netherlands. His three children: Pieter, Jennifer and Willem, are all members of the executive board, and own shares in the company. Together, they own 100% of VDL Groep.

Wim van der Leegte died on 19 November 2023, at the age of 76.
