= VDL Groep =

Industrial and manufacturing company

- Company type: Private
- Industry: Diversified Manufacturing
- Founded: 1953; 73 years ago by Pieter van der Leegte
- Headquarters: Eindhoven, Netherlands
- Key people: Wim van der Leegte
- Products: Car assembly, Bus, Coach, Finished products and supply
- Revenue: ▲€5.0 billion (2017)
- Operating income: ▲€120.2 million (2014)
- Net income: ▲€153 million (2017)
- Number of employees: 16,137 (2017)
- Website: www.vdlgroep.com/en

VDL Groep is an international industrial and manufacturing company established in 1953. From its head office in Eindhoven, Netherlands, VDL supervises its subsidiaries, which have a high level of autonomy and responsibility for results.

The bus and coach division consists of coaches, public transport buses, chassis modules, second-hand buses and mini & midi buses. The finished products sector is extensive: suspension systems for the automotive industry, production automation systems, heating, cooling and air-technical systems, systems for the oil, gas and petrochemical industry, sunbeds and roof boxes, container handling equipment, systems for the agricultural sector, cigar-making and packaging machines, production systems for optical media and medical systems.

The company was formed in 1953 as Metaalindustrie en Constructiewerkplaats P. van der Leegte by Pieter van der Leegte senior, the father of Wim van der Leegte, president and CEO of the company from 1972 until 2016, hence the name VDL. Today, Wim van der Leegte's youngest son, Willem van der Leegte is the president of the company.

== VDL companies ==
- VDL Bus & Coach - bus and coach builder based in Valkenswaard.
- VDL Nedcar - a brand independent car manufacturing plant in Born
- VDL TIM Hapert - is an international company specialized in the mechanical processing of cast and forging works and welding assemblies, spindles and complete products.
- VDL ETG - Former Philips precision machine factories, specializes in high tech module development, production and assembly.
- Van Hool - Belgium Based Bus Builder
