= DDM =

DDM may refer to:

== Computing, electronics ==
- Dante Domain Manager, a piece of software to control Dante-enabled Devices, see Dante (networking)
- Data Diffusion Machine, a virtual shared memory computer architecture from the 1990s
- Digital diagnostics monitoring function in SFP transceivers
- Distributed Data Management Architecture, an open, published architecture for creating, managing and accessing data on a remote computer.
- Dynamic Data Masking, a form of data masking
- Dynamic Device Mapping, an advanced technology for USB KVM switches

== Business and finance ==
- Deseret Digital Media, company
- Dividend Discount Model, a valuation method for shares based on dividends
- East German mark, a former currency (ISO code was DDM)

== Medicine, biology, psychology ==
- Disorders of diminished motivation
- Doctor of Dental Medicine, an academic degree for dentistry
- Drift Diffusion Model, a method used in psychological choice testing
- Maltosides (n-Dodecyl β-D-Maltopyranoside), a detergent used when purifying membrane proteins

== Transport, vehicular, engines, motors ==
- Difference in the Depth of Modulation, an amplitude modulation method used in the Instrument Landing System
- Deutsches Dampflokomotiv-Museum, the German Steam Locomotive Museum
- Dubbeldeks Materieel, a class of trains in the Netherlands
- Derrick Drilling Machine, or Top drive
- Dyson Digital Motor, a two-pole switched reluctance motor

== Science and technology ==
- Differential dynamic microscopy, an optical technique
- Direct Digital Manufacturing
- Domain decomposition methods

== Other uses ==
- Dharma Drum Mountain, a Buddhist educational foundation
- Didymoteicho, Evros, Greece; a Greek town
- Dungeon Dice Monsters, a board game
- Dungeons & Dragons Miniatures Game, collectible tactical skirmish game

== See also ==
- DM (disambiguation)
- 2DM (disambiguation)
