= List of trains in the Netherlands =

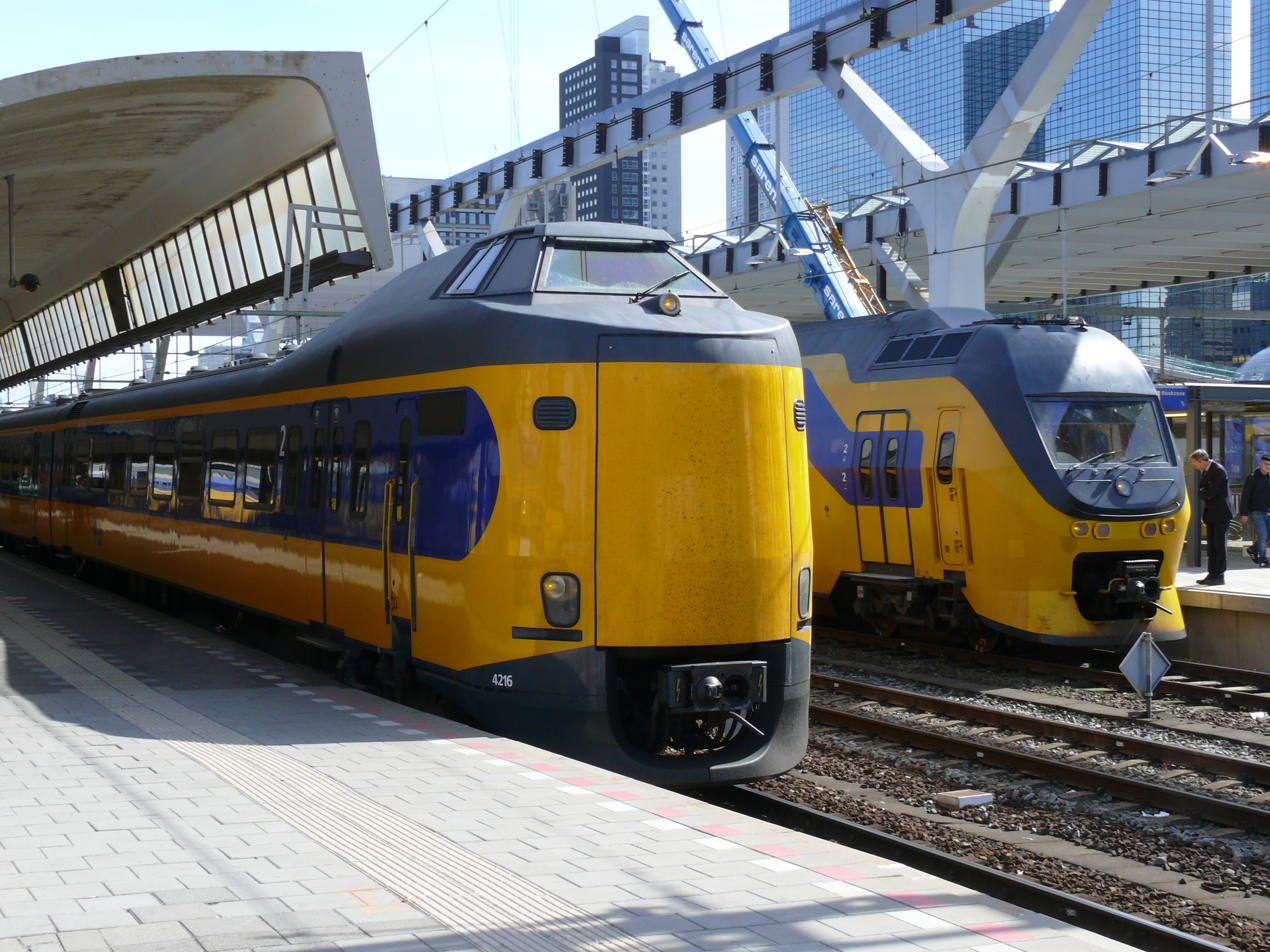
Two current Dutch Railways InterCity trains: a refurbished ICM train in the foreground, and the front of a VIRM double decker behind it. Photo taken during the rebuild of Rotterdam Central station; in the background the current overall roof is taking shape, while the foreground still shows one of the old individual platform covers.

The following are current and former trains in the Netherlands.

== In use ==
=== Diesel locomotives ===
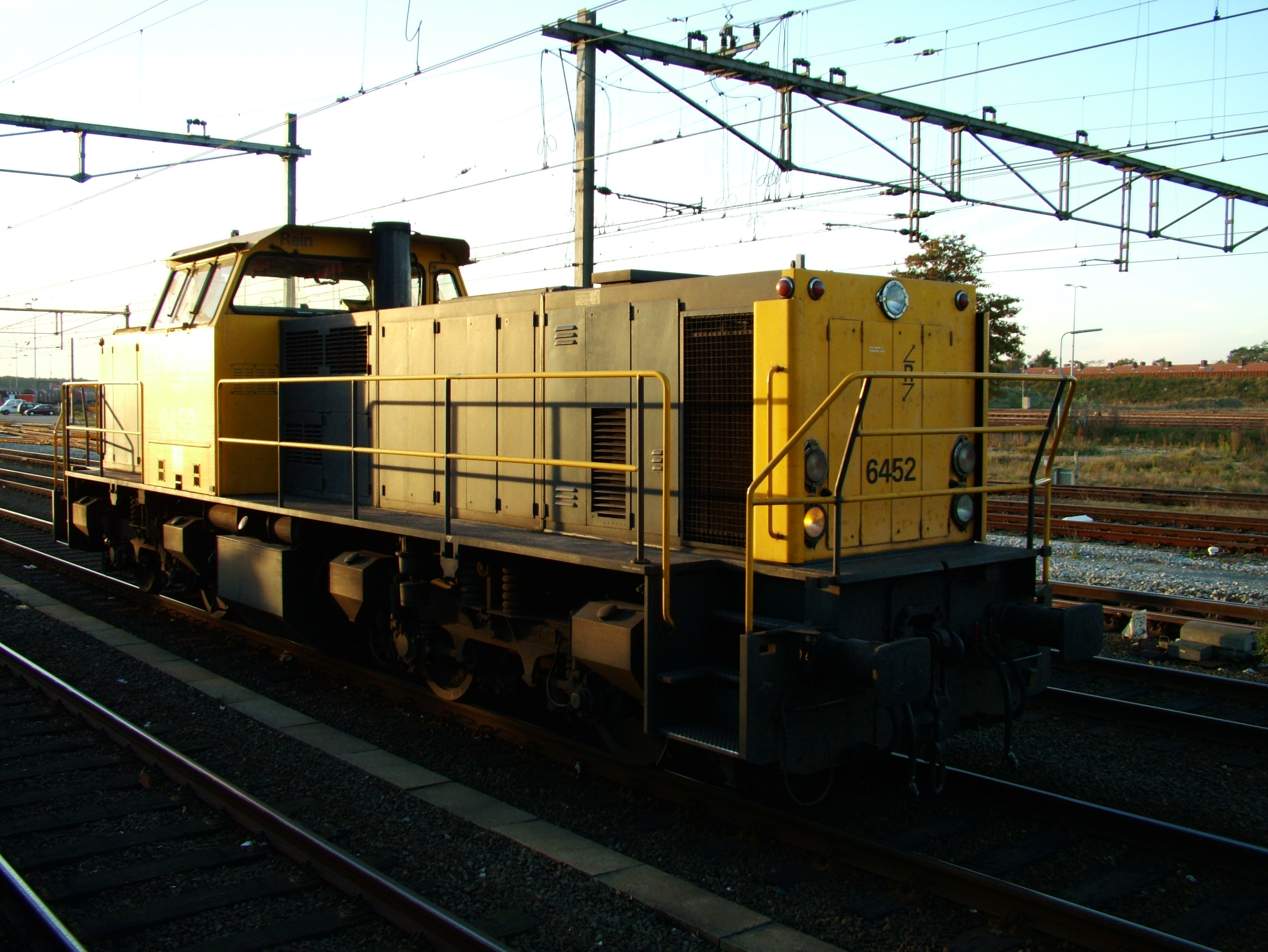
Dutch Railways 6400 Class diesel locomotive at Amersfoort station

- 600 Class: Traditional shunter used in the Netherlands & UK. They are still used at Crailoo (between Bussum and Hilversum) by Railpro.
- V60D: Ex Czech Railways shunting locomotives.
- V 100: Ex German locomotives operated by VolkerRail, Alstom, Rotterdam Rail Feeding and Captrain.
- 700 Class: Vossloh G400B locomotives in use by Nederlandse Spoorwegen, Train Charter Services and Strukton.
- 6400 Class: A locomotive used for both shunting and pulling trains by DB Cargo. Some are permitted to operate in Belgium (called "Vlaamse Reuzen") and some in Germany (called "Duitse Herders"). Many are sold abroad.
- Class 66: European version of the UK Class 66 locomotives used by various freight companies.
- Vossloh G1206: Locomotives used by a number of private freight and infrastructure companies.
- Vossloh G2000 BB: Locomotives used by Lineas, Rotterdam Rail Feeding and Rail Force One.

=== Electric locomotives ===
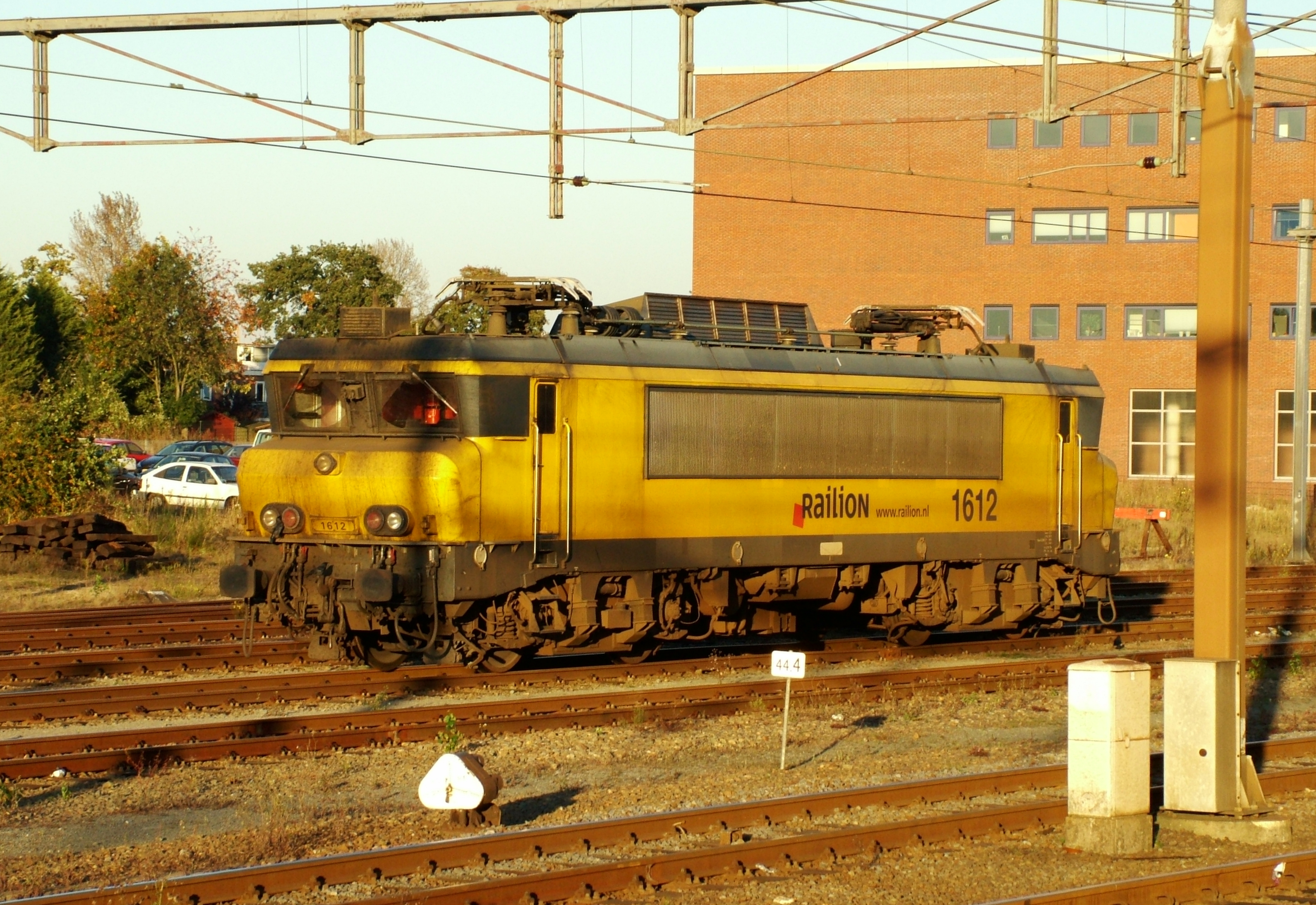
1600 Class locomotive in the Railion livery at Amersfoort station

- 1200 Class: These locomotives are former NS locomotive; They are operated by Railexperts for charter trains.
- 1600 Class and 1800 Class: These two types of locomotives are the same, the 1800 series got renumbered from 1600 after the partial privatisation of the NS. The 1600 are used by a number of freight companies. The 1800 were used by NS Reizigers. They are stil used by Railexperts and Rail Force One.
- 1700 Class: This locomotive is very similar to the 1600/1800 in appearance but technically different. They were frequently used in combination with DD-AR/DDM until late 2019 and the Intercity between Amsterdam and Berlin until late 2023. Currently they are operated by Volkerrail, Strukton, Rail Force One and Train Charter Services.
- Plan mP (Motorpost): These are the trains formerly used to distribute mail. Currently they have various tasks such as measuring rails or locate gps.
- 186 Class: Since 2008, 14 TRAXX F140 AC2 locomotives have been leased by NS from Alpha Trains for operations on the HSL-Zuid. They are painted yellow with blue. The NS ordered 45 of these locomotives for use on high speed services; deliveries of these started in the Summer of 2014. The 186 is also used by a large number of freight companies.
- 189 Class: Certain locomotives of DB Cargo Class 189 are operating primarily in the Netherlands, they are distinguished by large white contrast areas on the front sides (otherwise painted red). These are also used by many private freight operators.
- Siemens Vectron: Certain locomotives of DB Cargo, Nederlandse Spoorwegen and other operators operating primarily in the Netherlands, being used for the NightJet and many freight services across the country.

=== Diesel multiple units ===
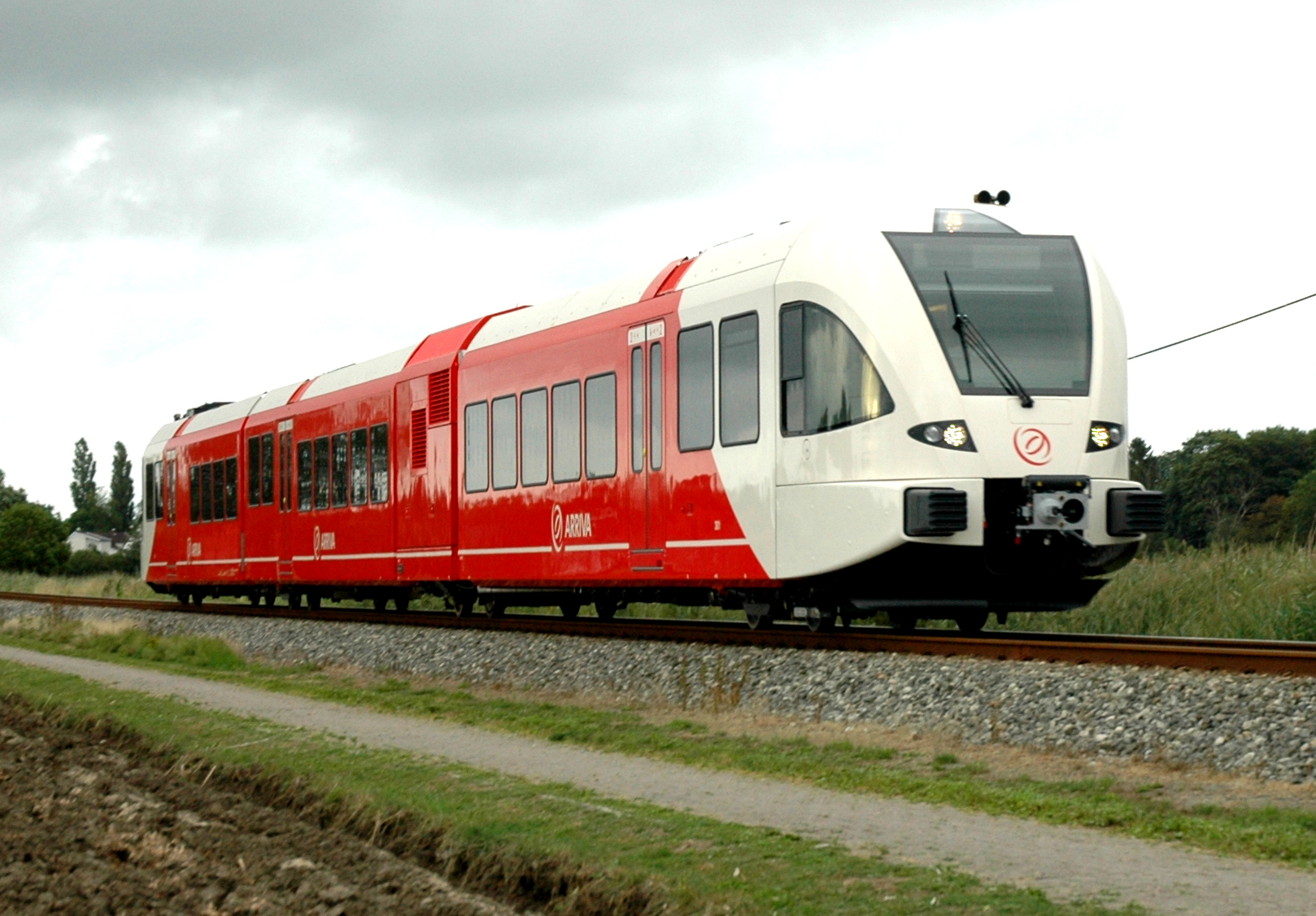
Arriva (Spurt) GTW

- Lint 41 are DMUs used by Arriva. Used on the Zutphen – Hengelo – Oldenzaal and Almelo - Hardenberg services.
- Stadler GTW are DMUs used by Arriva and Breng. They replaced the Wadlopers and Buffels. Arriva uses them in the north of the Netherlands on the diesel lines out of Groningen to Delfzijl, Rodeschool, Nieuwschans (and Leer) and Leeuwarden. They also operate out of Leeuwarden to Harlingen and Stavoren. Since 2012 Arriva also uses them on the Arnhem – Tiel, – Winterswijk, Winterswijk – Zutphen and Zutphen – Apeldoorn services. And since 2016 Arriva uses them on the Roermond – Venlo and Venlo – Nijmegen services. Breng uses these units between Arnhem and Doetinchem.

=== Electric multiple units ===
==== High-speed services ====
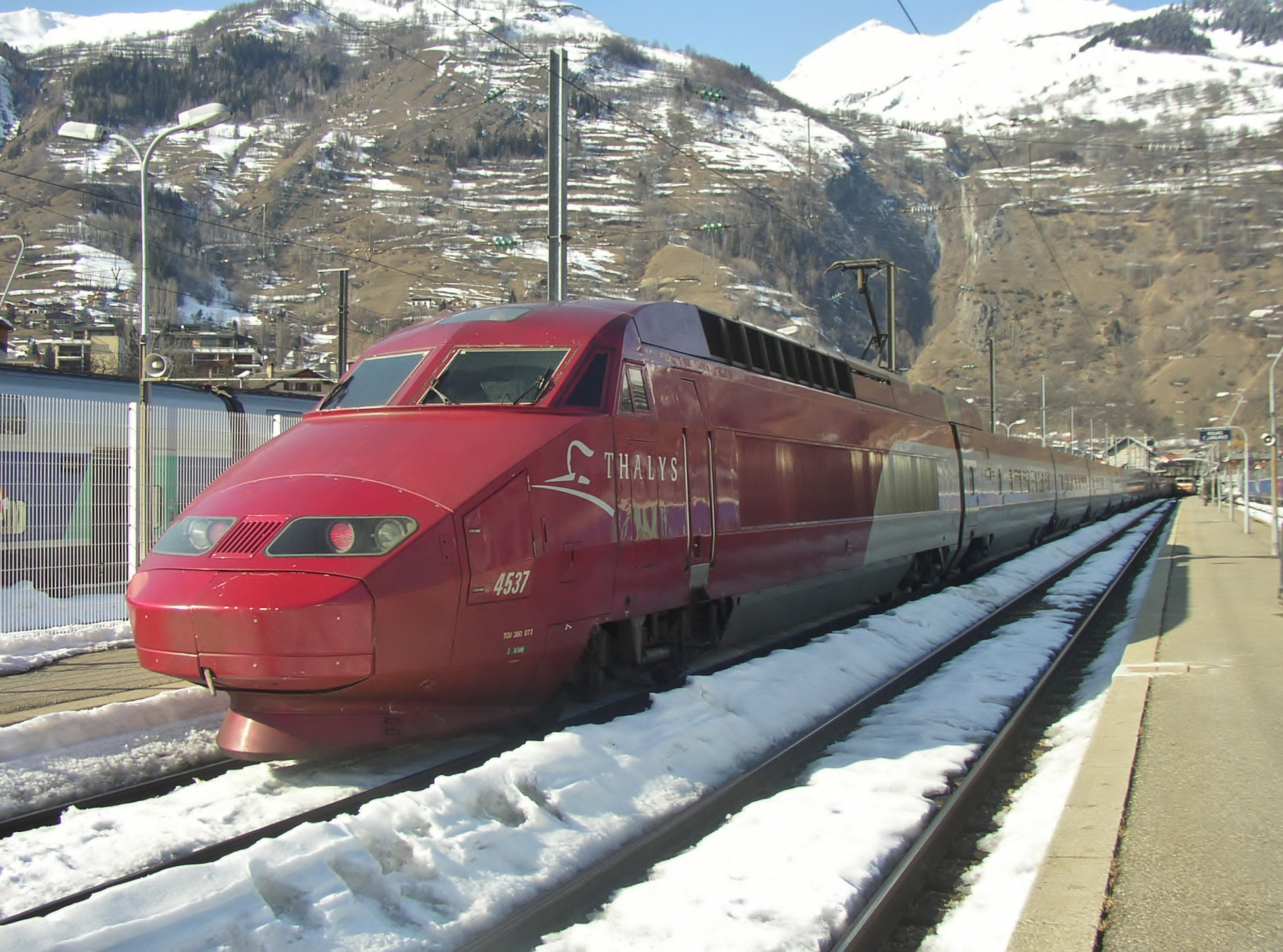
Thalys PBA

- The ICE 3neo is a German high-speed train that currently runs between Amsterdam and Arnhem in the Netherlands, onto Frankfurt, Cologne and Berlin in Germany and Basel in Switzerland. ICE trains require special high-speed tracks to run at high speeds, but can also run on normal tracks at normal speeds.
- The Thalys PBA and Thalys PBKA are used for Thalys services to Paris and Lille. Thalys is a high-speed train network built around the high-speed line between Paris, Brussels and Amsterdam. This track is shared with Eurostar trains that go from Paris or Brussels to London via Lille and the Channel Tunnel and with French domestic TGV trains. The system uses two models of trains, the PBA and the PBKA, which both belong to the TGV (train à grande vitesse) family of high-speed trains built by Alstom in France, although they are not identical to domestic TGV sets. Beyond Brussels, the main cities Thalys trains reach are Antwerp, Rotterdam, Amsterdam, Liège, Aachen and Cologne. Trains to these destinations run partly on dedicated high-speed tracks and partly on regular tracks. Since the completion of Dutch high speed line (the HSL-Zuid) the Thalys travels from Amsterdam to Schiphol, to Rotterdam and via Breda to Antwerp in Belgium.
- The British Rail Class 374 operated by Eurostar which began operating in the Netherlands on 4 April 2018. Eurostar is a high-speed railway service connecting London with Amsterdam, Avignon, Brussels, Lille, Lyon, Marseille, Paris and Rotterdam. All its trains traverse the Channel Tunnel between the United Kingdom and France, owned and operated separately by Getlink.

==== Intercity services ====
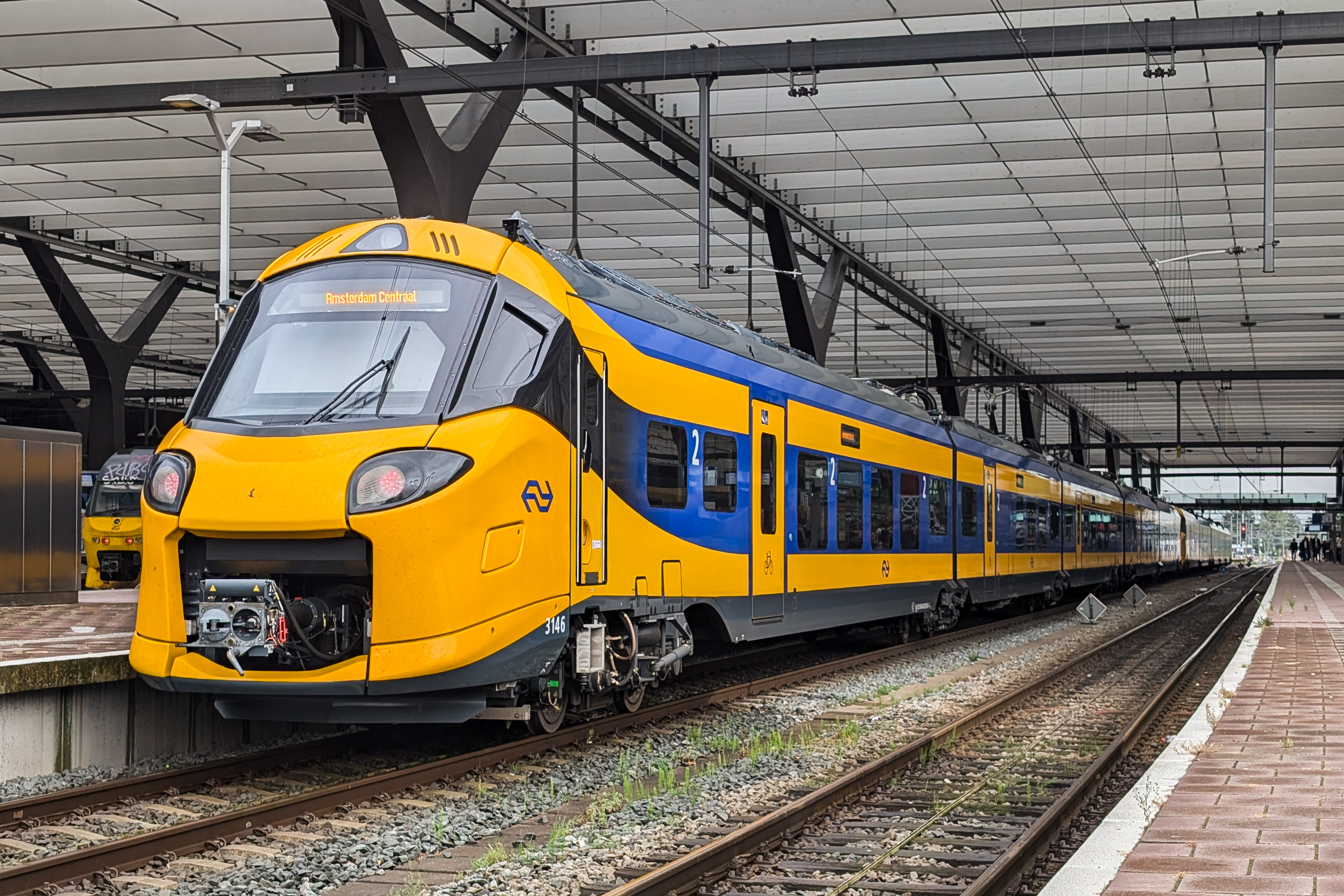
ICNG train at Rotterdam Central station

- The Koploper (ICM) (Intercitymaterieel) is a 3- or 4-car multiple unit that when coupled with another one, allowed passengers to walk through (the name Koploper being a play on words – literally "head walker", but in actual use meaning "front runner"). NS decided to close the doors permanently on 31 October 2005 because the mechanism broke down too often.

A scheduled modernisation of around 7 million euro will see the ICM fleet updated. The renovated ICM trains provide 13% more seats, have a new interior, a bathroom accessible by wheelchairs, airconditioning as well as upgrades to the engine and connection systems. The head doors are removed. Also, these (renovated) trains are the first trains in the NS fleet equipped with OBIS. OBIS provides a (free) WiFi-connection on board, along with in-train journey information provided through screens and (automated) vocal announcements through the trains speakers. This journey information provides the actual status, and thus, it is always up-to-date to the actual situation on its trips, and the stations it passes.

- The DDZ (Dubbeldekker zonering) (go to DUTCH page New Intercity Double Decker (in Dutch)) EMUs are converted from DDM-2/3 resembling the bilevel rail cars series DDM-1 from 1985 and operates in fixed formations of 4 or 6 coaches. All trains use an mDDM motorcar for traction, which resembles a DD-AR driving trailer but has electric motors and a single passenger deck on top; the level of this deck is higher than that of a regular single deck rail car, but lower than the upper deck of the other coaches.
- The VIRM (Verlengd Interregiomaterieel), also called Regiorunner was partially rebuilt from trainsets DD-IRM (Dubbeldeks Interregiomaterieel). DD-IRM was delivered in 3- and 4-car trainsets. 3-car trainsets got one extra coach, 4-car trainsets got two extra coaches. Also, new 4- and 6-car trainsets were built. Thus, a train consists of one or more combinations of 4 or 6 double deck coaches; each combination (multiple unit) has electric motors. More than three hundred coaches are currently operative in the Netherlands.
- The ICNG (Intercity Nieuwe Generatie) is operated by NS as of 2023.

==== Local services ====
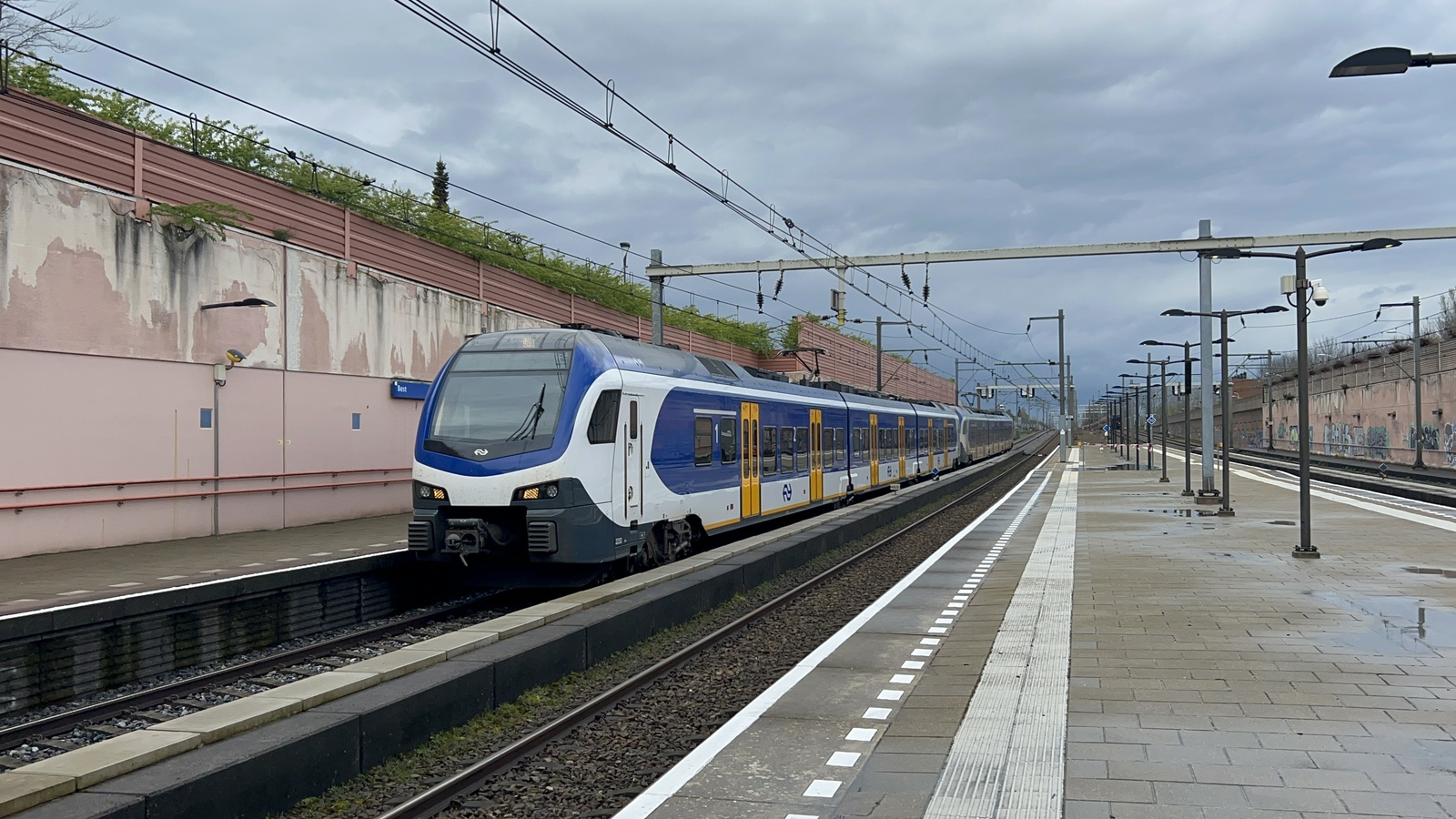
Stadler FLIRT operated by NS approaching station Best

- The PROTOS is a train which was built by Fahrzeugtechnik Dessau for the Valleiljn. There are 5 units of them in use with Keolis.
- The Sprinter Lighttrain or SLT is a new (2007 onwards) 4 or 6 car unit, built partly to replace Mat '64 stock. There are 131 of them. They do not have a toilet. For this reason further orders have been cancelled. Building toilets into the existing trains had been considered during the building phase, but it was judged to be too expensive. At this moment toilets are being built in to these trains.
- The electric Stadler GTW is operated by Arriva for services on electrified lines in South Limburg, together with the Stadler FLIRT. The other services of Arriva in Limburg are on non-electrified lines, and are operated by the diesel Stadler GTW. As of 9 December 2018, it's also operated by Qbuzz on the MerwedeLingeLijn between Dordrecht and Geldermalsen.
- The Stadler FLIRT is operated by Arriva, Keolis Nederland, NS and NS R-Net
- The Sprinter New Generation or SNG is operated by NS since 9 December 2018, which is built by CAF Civity.

== Future use ==
=== Intercity services ===
- The DDNG (Dubbeldekker Nieuwe Generatie) is planned to be in operation by NS in 2029

== Out of service ==
=== Steam locomotives ===
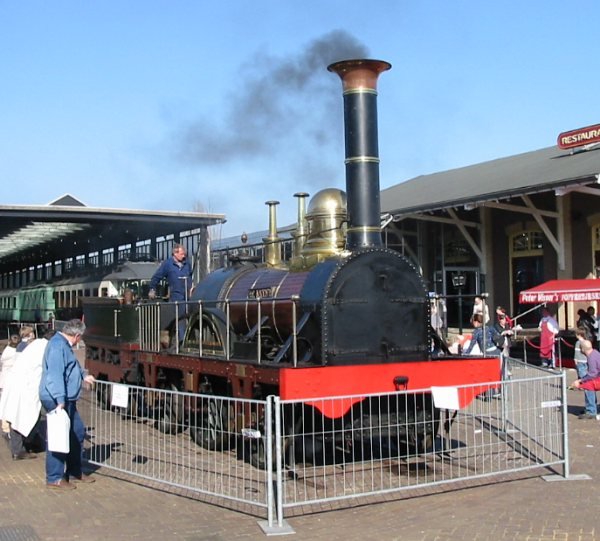
Arend steam locomotive

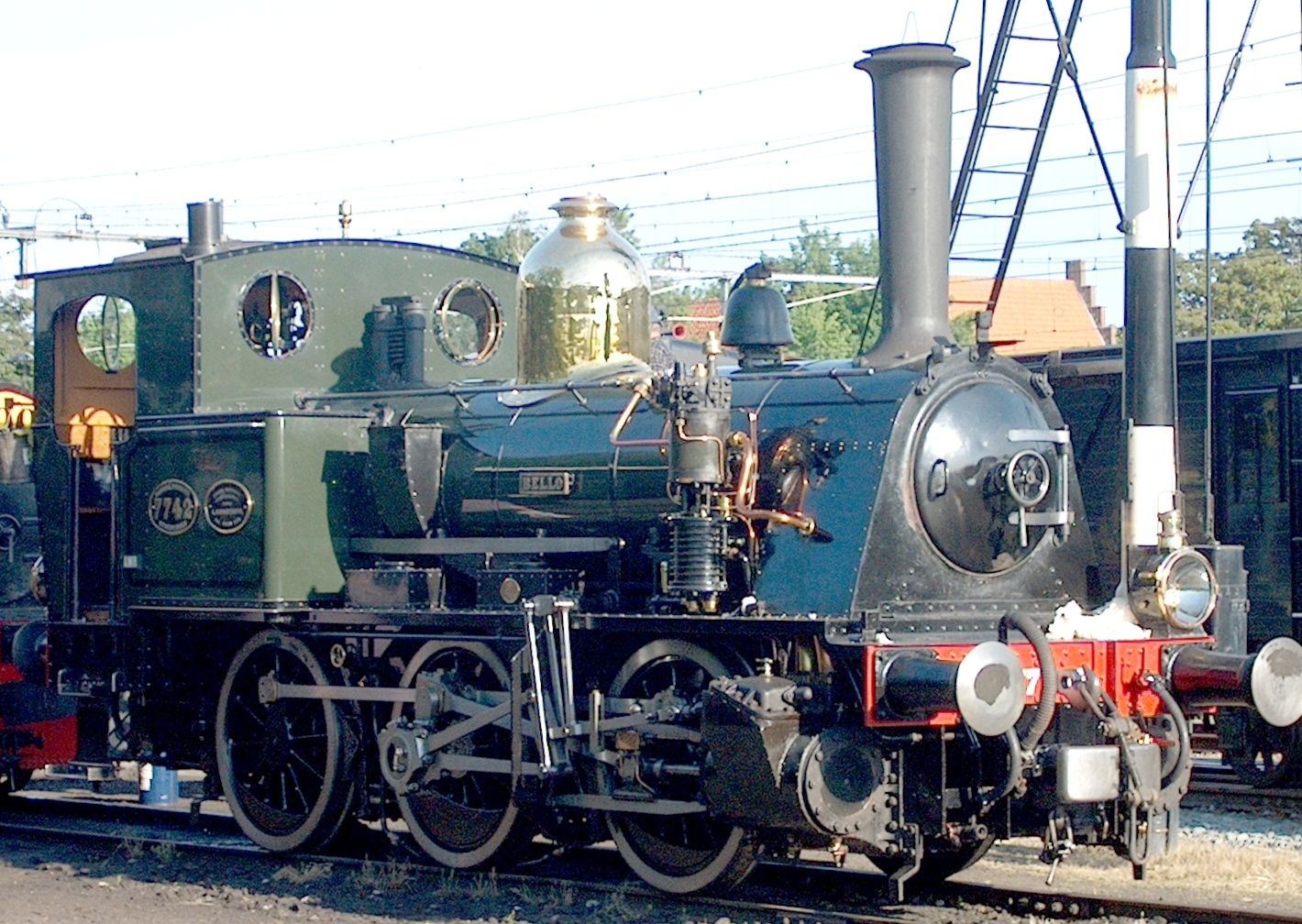
Loc 7742 - "Bello"

- Arend: (Dutch for "eagle") was the first locomotive in the Netherlands and pulled the first train between Amsterdam and Haarlem in 1839.
- Series 600: Formerly SS (Staats Spoorwegen) 255-260. Built 1866 by Beyer, Peacock & Company in Manchester. Originally built as 2-4-2 engines, but rebuilt as 0-4-2s to allow them to do shunting.
- Series 700: A class of 2-4-0 passenger engines. This class was also built in 1866 by Beyer, Peacock & Company, and renumbered after HSM (Hollandische IJzeren Spoorweg Maatschappij) and SS began to cooperate. It is considered one of the most beautiful locomotive types in the Netherlands. It was taken out of service in 1933. Formerly SS 1II-5II, 9-78, and NBDS (Noord Brabant Duitse Spoorweg) 1-5.
- Series 1300 ('Grote Groenen'): A class of 2-4-0 engines built by Beyer, Peacock & Company from 1880 to 1895. They were nicknamed 'Grote Groenen' or 'Big Green'. It was designed for fast passenger and mail service over the SS lines to Germany, which competed with the NBDS and the HSM. These locomotives could pull a 15-coach train at 50 mph (80 km/h) when well fueled, which was fast for the time.
- Series 1500: was a series of high-speed train locomotives of the Dutch Railways (NS) and its predecessors Maatschappij tot Exploitatie van Staatsspoorwegen (SS) and Nederlandsche Centraal-Spoorweg-Maatschappij (NCS).
- Series 1600 ('Rhijnboog'): A class of 4-4-0 engines built by Sharp Stewart from 1889 to 1903. These were the first engines in the Netherlands to use bogies, and were nicknamed 'Rhijnboog' or 'Rhine Arch'. When the SS took over the NRS (Nederlandse Rhijn Spoorweg), this class was split between the SS and the HSM. The SS sold their locomotives to the HSM because their turntables were too short. Formerly NRS 101-109, or later HSM 350-408.
- Series 1700 ('Overkoker'): A larger class of 4-4-0 engines built to pull the fast passenger services, which continued to increase in weight. These locomotives were nicknamed 'Overkoker', or 'Boil Over'. Formerly SS 801-935.
- Series 2000: The first 4-4-2 (Atlantic) engines in the country, built by Beyer, Peacock & Company in 1900. This class was designed to pull the increasingly heavy mail trains from Vlissingen to Boxtel. Formerly SS 995-999.
- Series 2100: A class of 4-4-0 passenger trains built by Schwartzkopff between 1914 and 1920. At the time this class was built, the SS had recently bought a class of 4-6-0s (SS 700s/NS 3700s), and the HSM didn't want to stay behind. They had to use 4-4-0s due to the length of the turntables, however. Formerly HSM 501-535.
- Series 2800: These were the first 0-6-0 freight engines on the NRS. They were built by Beyer, Peacock & Company from 1865 to 1881. After the NRS was bought out, the engines were divided between the HSM and the SS. By the time the NS was formed, only the SS engines came into service.
- Series 2900 ('Driemaster'): A class of 0-6-0 freight engines built by Beyer, Peacock & Company between 1865 and 1878. They were nicknamed 'Driemaster' or 'Three-master', as they were the first six-coupled freight engines built in the country. Originally owned by the SS.
- Series 3200 ('Kamer en suite'): A class of 0-6-0s designed for goods trains, built by Sharp Stewart and Werkspoor between 1895 and 1907. They quickly became the standard class for such work, and were nicknamed 'Kamer en suite'/'Room en suite', possibly due to their large cabs. Formerly HSM 601-647.
- Series 3300: Following the freight locomotives HSM 601-647 with three coupled axles from the years 1895-1907 the HSM ordered at Werkspoor about fifteen similar freight locomotives, now with superheater. These were delivered in 1912 (HSM 671-675), 1914 (HSM 676-680) and 1915 (HSM 681-685). The locomotives performed very well in service.
- Series 3500: In 1907, the NBDS was the first railway company in the Netherlands to order express train locomotives with the axle layout 2'C, which were delivered by Beyer, Peacock & Company in 1908 and were put into service with the numbers 30-35. The larger companies Nederlandsche Centraal-Spoorweg-Maatschappij (NCS) and SS only arrived two years later with such express train locomotives, the NCS 71-78, later NS 3600 and SS 700, later NS 3700.
- Series 3700 ('Jumbo'): The NS 3700 series was a series of 120 4-6-0 (2'C) express steam locomotives from the Dutch Railways. Ordered by the SS and later also the NS. The locomotive were built by Beyer, Peacock and Company, Werkspoor, Henschel & Sohn, Hanomag and Schwartzkopff between 1910 and 1928.
- Series 3900 ('Grote Jumbo'): The NS 3900 series was a series of express train steam locomotives from the Dutch Railways. At the end of the 1920s, the Dutch Railways needed an express train locomotive that was stronger than the 3700 series, because more and more wooden passenger cars were replaced by steel. Meanwhile the axle load could also be increased from 16 tons to 18 tons. This resulted in a design that looked similar to both the series 3600 and 3700. The 3900 series was given the rod or bar frame of the 3600, but in terms of the design of the boiler, cylinders and operator's house, it appeared to be an enlarged 3700, but with a more powerful boiler and cylinders with a 420 mm (17 in) diameter instead of 400 mm (16 in). With this, both the pulling power and the power increased by about 15 percent. The same boiler would later be used in the tender locomotive 6300. The tender was roughly the same as that of the 3600 series and the later-built 4-axle tenders of the 3700 series. The series was able to quickly carry the heaviest passenger trains at a speed of 100 km/h (62 mph). The manufacturer, the German factory Henschel & Sohn, delivered the locomotives in two series in 1929 and 1930. The first series of 22 locomotives from 1929 (3901-3922) was initially not equipped with wind deflectors to prevent the wind from blowing the smoke. The chimney would blow into the operator's view. These were applied in 1930. The second series of ten locomotives (3923-3932) was supplied with wind deflectors immediately upon delivery.
- Series 4000: The NS 4000 series was a series of fast train steam locomotives in service with the Dutch Railways from 1945 to 1956.
- Series 4300 (II) ('Kleine Jeep' / 'Dakota') (ex-WD Austerity 2-8-0)
- Series 4500-4600:In 1914 the NBDS ordered four freight locomotives at Hohenzollern in Düsseldorf-Grafenberg with the intended numbers 118-121. Due to the outbreak of World War I in 1915, delivery was delayed. It was not until 1917 that the 118 was delivered, followed by the 119 in 1918. In 1919 the NBDS merged into the SS, where the locomotives 118 and 119 received the SS numbers 1301 and 1302. The locomotives delivered in 1920 came directly into service with the SS numbers 1303 and 1304.
- Series 4700 ('Kerstboom'): Already in World War II, the Dutch government ordered 50 steam locomotives in London at the Swedish factory Nydqvist & Holm AB (NOHAB) in Trollhättan to quickly bring the fleet of locomotives greatly reduced by warfare. To save time, they opted for existing models of typically Swedish locomotives. This involved 15 express train locomotives with the axle layout 2'C and 35 freight locomotives with the axle layout D. The express train locomotives were divided into the NS 4000 series and the freight locomotives in the NS 4700 series.
- Series 5000
- Series 5000 (II) ('Grote Jeep') (ex-WD Austerity 2-10-0)
- Series 5500
- Series 6000 ('Bok')
- Series 6100
- Series 6200
- Series 6300
- Series 6500
- Series 6700
- Series 6800
- Series 6900
- Series 7100: Ten 2-4-2T locomotives (numbered 7101–10), ex Noord-Friesche Locaalspoorweg-Maatschappij and Hollandsche IJzeren Spoorweg-Maatschappij.
- Series 8600 ('De Turken')
- Series 8800 ('Hunslet') (ex-WD Austerity 0-6-0ST)
- Series 9500
- Series 9600

=== Diesel locomotives ===
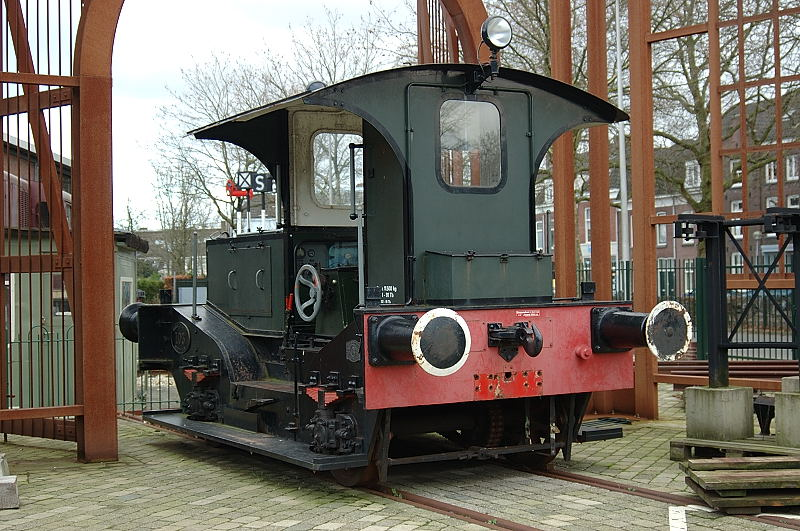
Oersik class

- 100 Class: The "oersik" was designed by the NS Service of Rolling Stock and Workshops and built by Berliner Machinenbau A.G. Due to the broad and low mounted footboards the enginedriver could easily mount and dismount.
- 200 Class: "Sik". A light shunting locomotive. Some Sikken had a crane.
- 400 Class: "Grote Sik" locomotives were not in service for long as they were too light for steadily increasing weight of the shunting duties. They were built after War by Werkspoor
- 500 Class and 600 Class: nicknamed "Hippel" or "Bakkie". These are shunting locomotives currently not in use with NS anymore, although a few have been sold to other companies.
- Series 700
- NS Class 2000: These locomotives were bought from the American Army after World War 2 and came into service as series 600. 20 locomotives were in use, some of them were reserve. After a few years the American engines were replaced by Werkspoor-Engines due to a lack of spareparts. The series was then renumbered to 2000. Between 1958 and 1960 most were scrapped.
- 2200 Class: Widely used diesel locomotive. Built by two consortiums in the Netherlands and France, based on the Baldwin VO-1000 design. Later some were used in Belgium for the construction of the high-speed connection between Netherlands and Belgium.
- 2400 Class: Widely used diesel locomotive. Later some were used in France for the construction of the high-speed lines. A special version of this locomotive exists called "De Bisschop" (2530). It had a higher constructed cab as experiment. Because of the purple colour it is nicknamed "The Bishop".
- 2600 Class: The NS series 2600 "Beel" diesel locomotives were built by Werkspoor in Utrecht in 1958. They were mainly used on the Eindhoven – Venlo line and later on Nijmegen – Roermond as well. These locomotives were underpowered for their size, which led to them being used in pairs so that if one failed the second could take over. Their nickname "Beel" was given because their high front end resembled the forehead of Dutch minister Louis Beel. They were withdrawn and scrapped after only 5 years of service.
- 2800 Class: "Kreupele Marie" (Dutch for "Crippled Marie"). This prototype diesel locomotive, no. 2801, was designed by Matériel de Traction Diesel Electrique (MTDE) and built by Werkspoor in Utrecht in 1962. This firm was established by the Dutch Werkspoor and French Schneiderworks with the purpose of designing and building standardised diesel lokomotives. In 1962 the prototype came into NS service and was well known for its defects; hence it was given its nickname. It was withdrawn in 1970.
- 2900 Class: This diesel locomotive was purchased by NS from the Statemines (series 151-155) for "Spoorslag '70". They were not long in service with NS, after a few years they were sold to the FEVE in Spain.
- 6700 Class: Former Belgian locomotive bought by ACTS.

=== Electric locomotives ===
- 1000 Class: Based on a Swiss locomotive. One is still in existence in the National Rail Museum in Utrecht, the Nederlands Spoorwegmuseum.
- 1100 Class: Based on the French Class BB 8100 locomotives. After a serious accident, the locomotives were equipped with a new nose.
- Benelux 1100 Class: These are Belgian locomotives that were used for the Benelux push-pull trains in combination with ICR carriages.
- 1300 Class: Based on the French Class CC 7100 locomotives. This six axles locomotives were mainly used for freight trains.
- 1500 Class: These are former British Rail Class 77 locomotives. The seven locomotives were purchased to relieve a shortage of locomotives in 1969. Locomotive no. 1501 is preserved in the Dutch Railway Museum; with 1502 & 1505 preserved in the UK.

=== Diesel multiple units ===
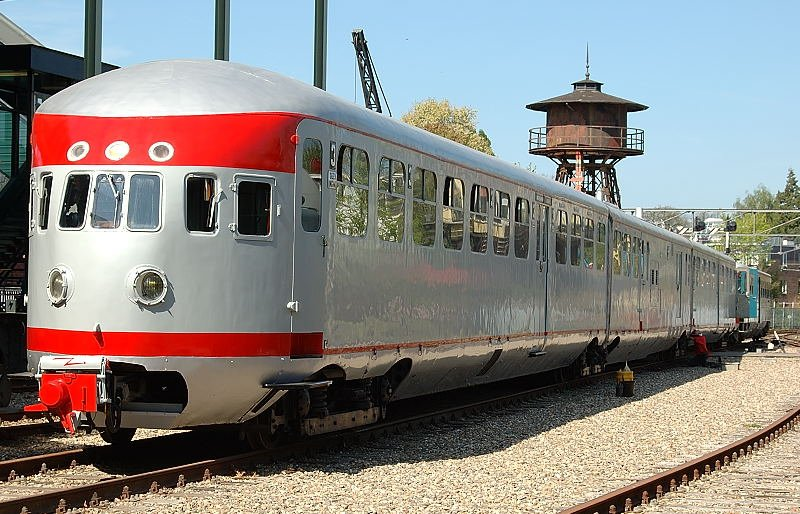
Materieel 34 in the Nederlands Spoorwegmuseum

- Mat '34: The very first series of streamlined multiple units of the NS were designed by Beijnes of Haarlem and were called the Mat '34, also nicknamed "Diesel Three". The streamlined form was developed during numerous trials at the Zeppelin Luftschiffahrt Gesellschaft in Friedrichshafen. The maximum speed was 140 km/h.
- DE-5: The NS dieselelectric five-car unit series DE 5 was built for fast-train services and foreign services. For this purpose they had large fueltanks sufficient for about 2000 km. The war, however, made these services impossible. In 1940 during a trialrun a speed of 172 km/h was reached. They were built by Werkspoor in Utrecht, Beijnes in Haarlem and Allan in Rotterdam; Brown Boveri from Switzerland provided the electric equipment and Maybach supplied the diesel engines.
- DE1: Nicknamed "Blauwe Engel" (Dutch for "Blue Angel"): A DMU consisting of one coach.
- DE2: A DMU consisting of 2 coaches. It was very similar to the DE 1
- DE3 or Plan U: Nicknamed "Rooie Duivel" (Dutch for "Red Devil") because of its original red livery this was a diesel electric multiple unit consisting of three coaches. The design was rather similar to the Mat '64 EMU (electric multiple unit). Some units were sold to Slovakia.
- DE4 or DE-IV: The NS DE-IV TEE 1001–1003 and SBB RAm 501–502 TEE DMUs were used for international Trans Europ Express (TEE) service.
- NS DE-20: nicknamed "De Kameel" (Dutch for "The Camel"). Originally it was in service as DMU for the board of directors, later it was for hire. Currently it is in the national railroad museum.
- DH1 and DH2: Nicknamed "Wadlopers" these are a diesel hydraulic multiple unit, operated in the North of the Netherlands by Arriva. There are two versions, one with two coaches, the other with one coach. One of the Wadlopers is re-painted in green, most remained yellow. These trains were used by Veolia on the 'Maaslijn' Nijmegen-Roermond. After their replacement by new trains the Wadlopers were decommissioned. The majority of the wadloper-fleet was sold to Poland, Argentina and Uruguay.
- omBC 2900: A DMU that was used in 1901–1903
- Buffel (DM'90) were the last diesel trains still operated by NS. They were evidently used on the secondary diesel lines, namely Zwolle – Enschede and Zwolle – Kampen. As of 11 December 2017 their services were replaced by electric Stadler FLIRT's after the electrification of those railway lines. One unit (3426) has become a museum train.

=== Electric multiple units ===
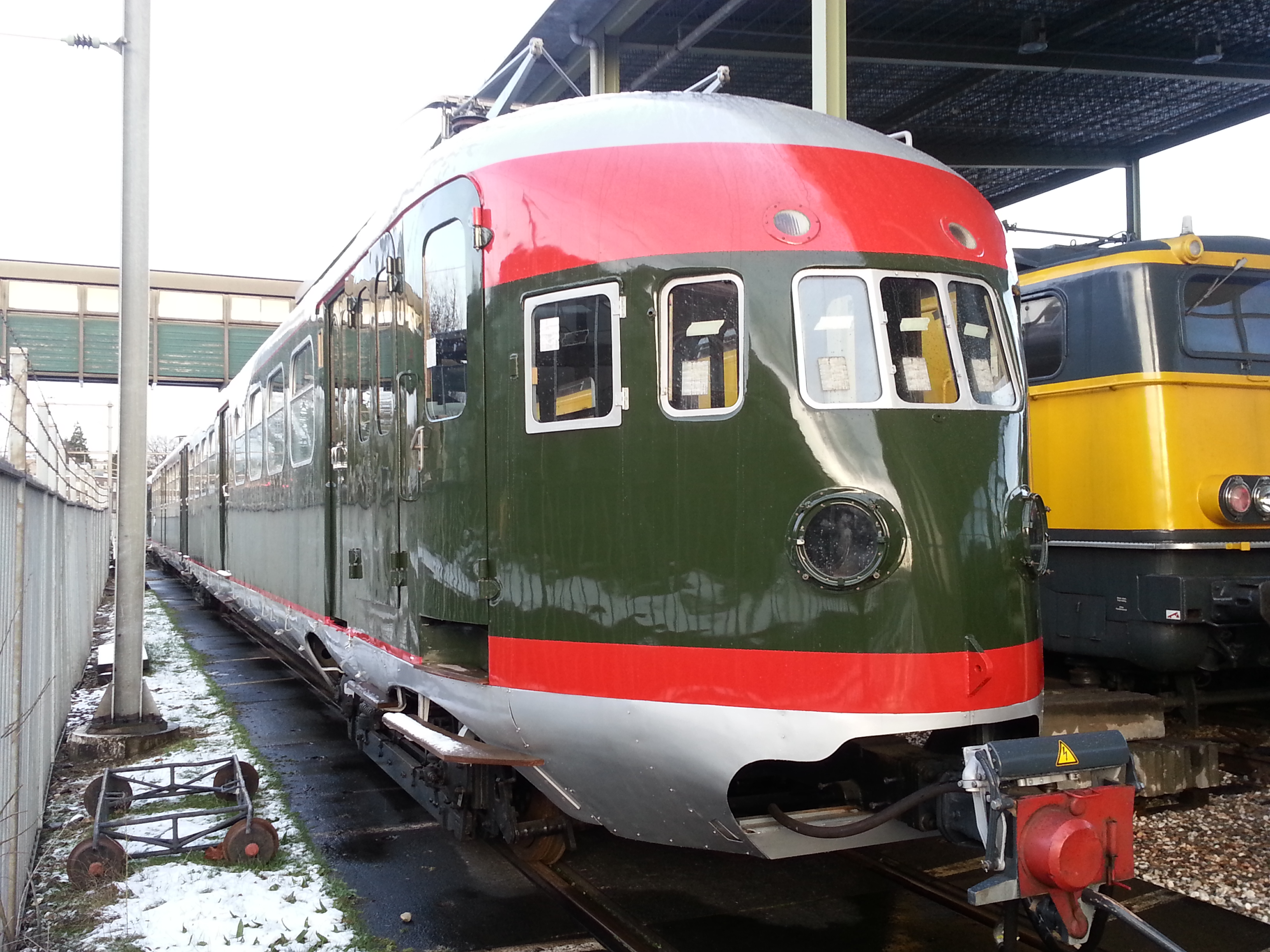
Mat'36

- Mat '24: In 1924, two prototype EMUs were delivered to NS, one by Werkspoor and the other by Beijnes. Both had the train composition mBD+Bec+Aec+Cec+mC. The Cecs were built by Hawa in Hanover. The Mat '24, nicknamed 'Blokkendoos', were especially for the services on the Old Line Amsterdam–Rotterdam which was electrified with 1500 V DC in this period. The third mBD5 was already delivered in 1924. Mat '24 series was built between 1923 and 1932.
- Mat '35: The first streamlined electric multiple units of NS Mat '35. They were nicknamed 'Hoek van Hollanders' because they were used between Rotterdam and Hook of Holland. Eight units were built: 4 with and 4 without luggage-section. They were built by Werkspoor, Beijnes en Allan and consisted of 2 coaches.
- Mat '36: This is practically the same as the Mat '35 EMU. They were built by Werkspoor in 1937–8. Versions existed consisting of two, three or four coaches.
- Mat '40: The two- and five-car version of Mat '40 "Gooimaterieel" so-called because the planned deployment on Amsterdam–Amersfoort although they hardly ever used on this line. There were designed for speeds up to 160 km/h and built by Beijnes in Haarlem and Werkspoor in Utrecht between 1942 and 1944. This series was very similar to the Mat '35 series as well.
- Mat '46: The NS Mat '46s were ordered to compensate for war-lost EMUs. This series had some differences compared to its predecessors: a convergent shaped front and sliding doors in the luggagecompartment. There are versions consisting of two and four coaches. From a technical viewpoint a four-car EMU consists of two two-car EMUs. They were built by Allan, Beijnes and Werkspoor between 1949 and 1952.
- Mat '54: NS Mat '54 "Hondekop" (Dognose) series was extremely solidly constructed, resulting in a heavy weight. The running characteristics are very good, the trains sticks to the rails as if it is made of concrete. Calculating weight per seat (888 kg), Mat '54 is the heaviest of its kind ever built in Europe. From the beginning, much attention was paid to the workplace of the driver. The series were built by Allan of Rotterdam between 1956 and 1958. Two versions existed, consisting of two, or four coaches. To modernise the Benelux-service (Amsterdam–Brussels) and the finishing of the electrification between Roosendaal and Essen, 12 EMU were built that these EMU run in multiple unit with existing EMUs. The EMU can run under 1500 V DC and 3000 V DC. In cooperation with the NMBS the following was decided: mechanically of the same construction as the NS Mat '54 and the electrical installation would be a Belgian one. On the ABk is the 1500 V DC pantograph, on the BDk the 3000 V DC one.
- SM'90 (Stoptreinmaterieel 90): The SM'90 EMUs (railhopper) ran on the line Zwolle – Emmen. Only 9 prototype trainsets were built as the intended successor to Mat '64. Due to engine and airco failing and an increase in the number of passengers, NS chose to buy more DDM coaches. In the early years of their service, the trainsets were ridden with trouble. All 9 trainsets have been taken out of service in December 2005 and were demolished.
- Mat'64: Plan TT (build 1960), Plan T (build 1964-1965) And the recently taken out of service Plan V (build 1966 - 1976). Build by Werkspoor in Utrecht and later by Talbot in Aachen, these trains were used primarily as stoptrains, although they could were also used as intercity's sometimes. They were unofficially called Apekop or monkeyhead because of its characteristic nose at the front and rear. These EMU's were very solid, and proved to be essential during the harsh winters when newer trains could not be used effectively. MAT'64 was slowly replaced by the Sprinter Lighttrain from the late 2000s onwards. The last Plan T was taken out of service in July 2010 and the last plan V was taken out of service on 4 April 2015. Several units have been saved from becoming scrap. One unit is now owned by the national railway museum in Utrecht.
- The V250 was a high-speed train operated as Fyra used for high-speed services. This train served the cities Amsterdam in the Netherlands and Brussels in Belgium or vice versa and serves as their terminus and the cities of Rotterdam and Breda along their routes. Today, all units are now sent back to Italy.(See parent page for details)

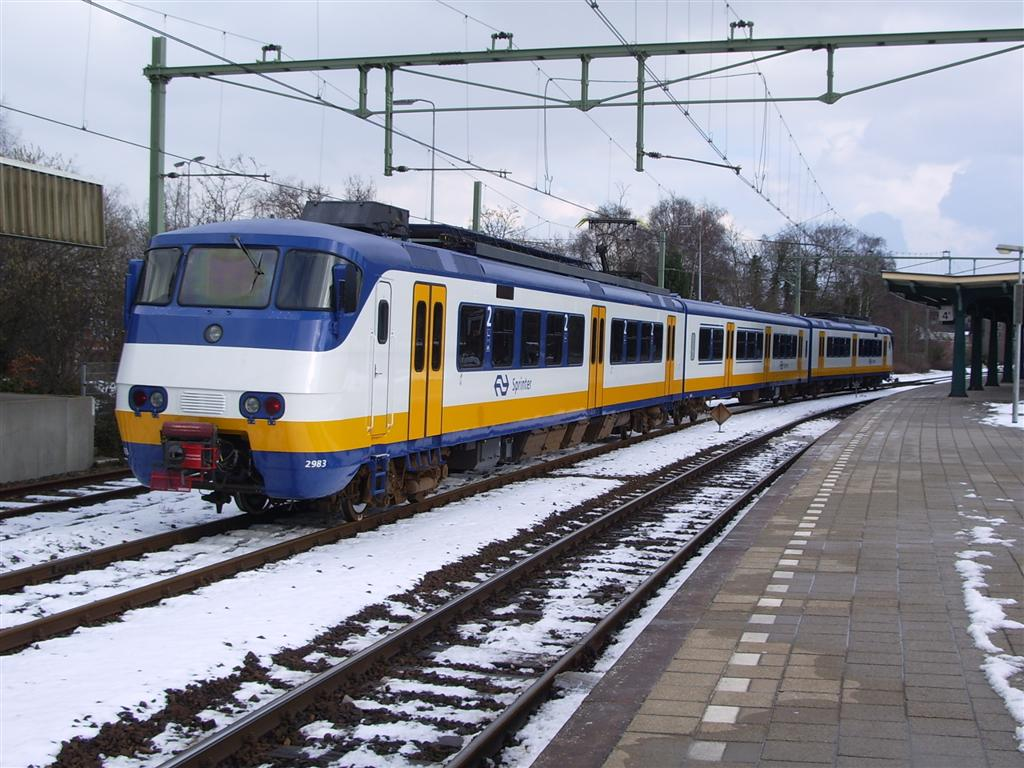
Sprinter unit 2983 at Deventer (2006).

- The Sprinter (SGM, Stads Gewestelijk Materieel) is a two or three car EMU, used on small distances. They are named Sprinter because they're able to accelerate and brake quite fast, making them very suitable for 'sprinter' services. They were also specifically designed for urban environments where they run commuter services. As a result, they are most commonly found in the Randstad area. The initial idea was that the Sprinter would provide somewhat of a subway/metro service but this plan failed as the cities of Amsterdam and Rotterdam continued to construct their own rapid transit systems. Nevertheless, in the densely populated Randstad, the Sprinters remain popular. Two car versions were revised and renamed to Citypendel. All Sprinters are now refurbished into the new white/yellow/dark blue livery. They were retired in 2021.
- The ICE 3M is a Dutch-German high-speed train that runs between Amsterdam and Arnhem in the Netherlands, onto Frankfurt and Cologne in Germany and Basel in Switzerland. ICE trains require special high-speed tracks to run at high speeds, but can also run on normal tracks at normal speeds. They were retired in 2025.

=== Coaches ===
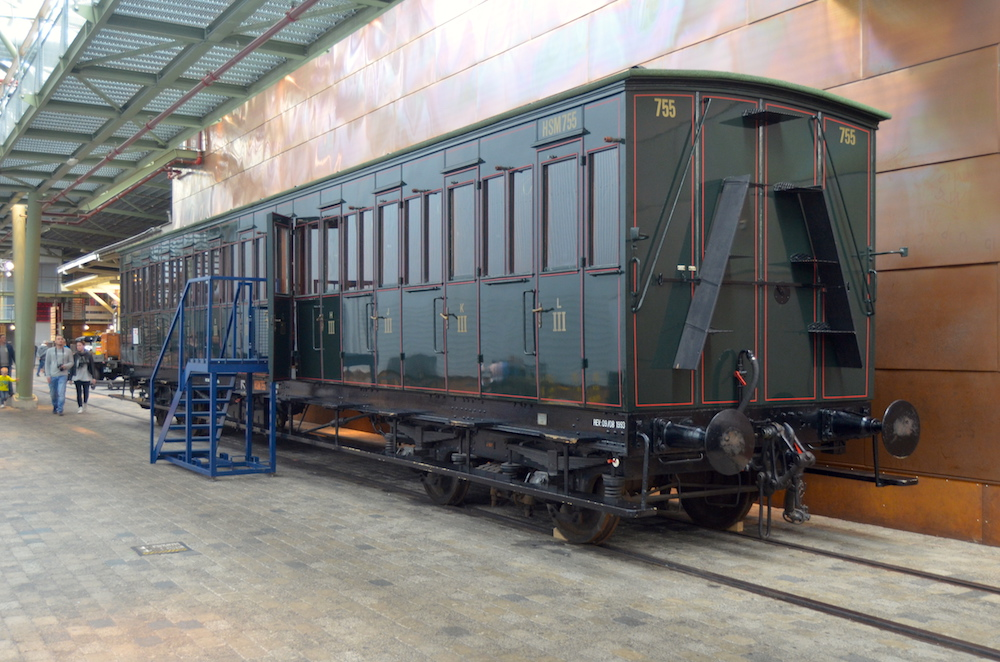
HSM C carriage in the Dutch Train Museum

- HSM C: The series C11 701-799, 1501-1535 was a series of 135 wooden third-class compartment cars. The coaches were built on behalf of the Hollandsche IJzeren Spoorweg-Maatschappij (HSM) and were transferred to the Dutch Railways at the merger in 1921. The last carriages of this series served until 1956.
- "Ovalenramen Rijtuig": The ovaleramen rijtuigen (oval-window coaches) were three series of carriages, built between 1928 and 1931 for the Dutch Railways. The first delivery consisted of nine coaches with first and second class (AB 7201-7209) and six coaches with third class (C 7201-7206) in 1928. In 1930 a follow-up order of another twelve carriages with first and second class (AB) followed. 7210-7221), which was delivered in 1930 and 1931. These carriages deviated from the earlier carriages in a number of small points.
- Stalen Couper Rijtuig: The steel compartment carriages were a series of a total of 85 carriages that entered service with the Dutch Railways in the early 1930s. Only third-class coaches of this type have been built so that they always join other coaches. Originally these wagons drove together with first / second class coaches D-train carriages.
- Stalen P or "Steel P": The steel postal coaches, also known by the nickname Steel Post or Steel P, is a former series of postal carriages of the Dutch Railways. These coaches were used in international trains from 1931 to 1964.
- Stalen D-treinrijtuigen: The steel D-train carriages were a series of carriages for mainly international rail connections. The carriages were built by Werkspoor for the Dutch Railways in the early 1930s. The carriages were characterized by a partial first and partial second class.
- Bolkoprijtuig: The chariot props were a series of railway carriages that were built between 1935 and 1958 for the Dutch Railways. There are four series to distinguish: the pre-war coaches, and the post-war Plan D, Plan C and Plan K.
- Stroomlijnpostrijtuig: For postal transport in Dutch trains, in the thirties, forties and fifties the stream line cars, type Pec [1], were built. These postal carriages were intended to be coupled with multiple units, and were therefore equipped with automatic couplings. They were owned by the state-owned PTT, but participated in the NS trains, which also took care of the maintenance.
- Plan C: Plan C was a collective order. In addition to the towing vehicles P 7911-7920 described here, the streamline coaches Pec 922-936 were also part of this. The order also included 50 trainsets Mat '46: 221-240 and 270-299. Plan C was a series of 10 postal cars from the PTT, derived from the Plan D carriages of the Dutch Railways. The postal cars were delivered in 1952 and decommissioned in 1979.
- Plan K: Plan K is a carriage series that was used by the Dutch Railways between 1957 and 1984.
- Stalen D: is the type designation for a series of drawn carriages that were used by the Dutch Railways between 1950 and 1987 for the transportation of luggage.
- Plan E: is a series of 196 steel coaches for long haul trains, ordered by NS by Werkspoor and Beijnes in 1954, to replace wooden carriages in the domestic service.
- Plan L: In 1958, NS ordered from Werkspoor 13 station wagons Plan L as an addition to and largely similar to the previously delivered postal carriages Plan E.
- Plan N: In 1958 Werkspoor in Utrecht delivered 25 couchettes to a new design. The construction of the heavy roundabout cars with their eight-tonne bogies was stopped and replaced by a new generation of carriages with a lighter building construction and ditto bogies. They were known as Plan N. The carriages were put into service in the familiar blue colors and were assigned the series Bc10 7001-7025.
- Plan O: Plan O is the designation for a never-built series of cars of the Dutch Railways (NS). The AB coach was designed for NS in 1957 by W. de Steur of Allan & Co. They fell through their windows with rounded sides, this was due to the construction with diagonal beams that offered more strength without significantly increasing the weight. Werkspoor also created a more classic design and in 1958 produced two test bogies that temporarily ended up under carriage Bc10 7025 of Plan N. The design of these two test bogies is very similar to the later (running) bogies for the equipment of the Plans U, T, V and W.
- Plan W: second class coaches similar to the German Silberlinge coaches.
- K4: K4 was the name for a series of 84 coaches of the Belgian railways. The carriages were bought in 1994 from the French national railway company SNCF to be used in rush-hour trains in Belgium. Between 2000 and 2002, carriages of this series were used in Intercity trains of the Dutch Railways.
- M2: The M2 railway carriages of the NMBS consisted of a series of carriages for domestic traffic which operated in the Netherlands from 1954. The coaches were built in different variants from 1954, totaling 620 copies. After the influx of the diesel trainsets MW41 the last carriages were removed.

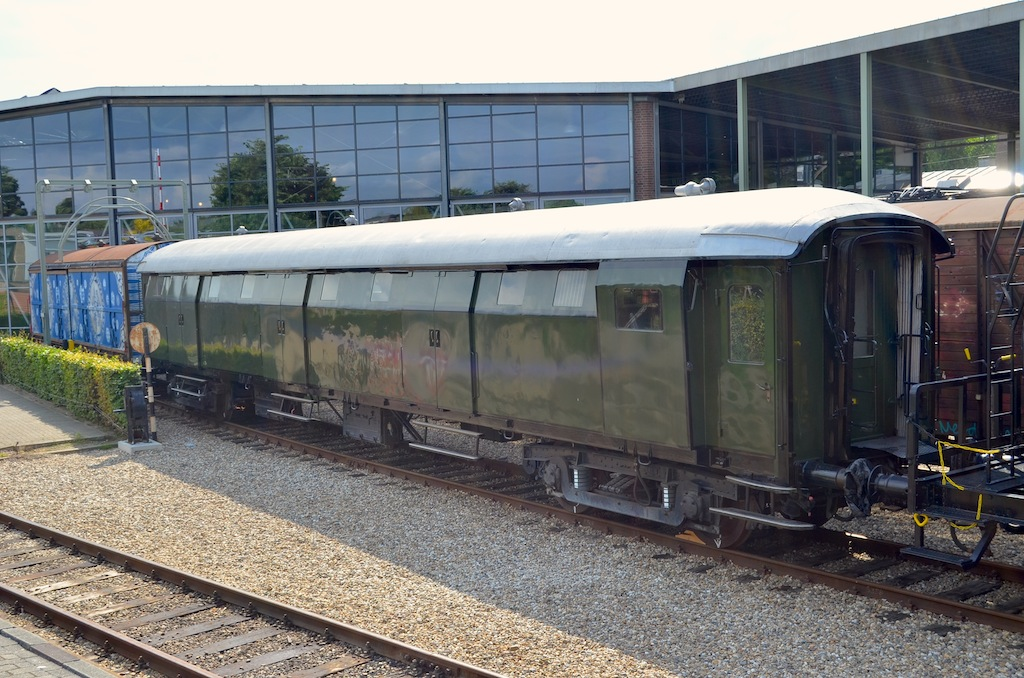
Baggagerijtuig

- IC+: The coaches for the IC+, a short-lived experimental train with more facilities, were converted from normal coaches ICR. The coaches were rebuilt to standard coaches ICRm during the revision of ICR.
- Bcm: A couchette.
- ICL: (Inter City Leased) These wagons are leased from the DB, they are now placed aside on emplacement Dijkgracht in Amsterdam, waiting to be delivered back to the DB.
- AVMZ:formerly Avmz 111, was converted as a type of intercity coach of the Dutch Railways. They are ten first-class coaches that were built by various manufacturers from 1962 onwards for use in international trains.
- ICK: ("InterCity Korte termijn") These are former German cars that were bought to relieve the shortage of material NSR suffered from.
- The DD-AR (Dubbeldeksaggloregiomaterieel) EMUs were delivered as DDM-2/3 resembling the bilevel rail cars series DDM-1 from 1985 and operates in fixed formations of 3 or 4 coaches. Four car trains use a class 1700 locomotive for traction, three car trains use an mDDM motorcar, which resembles a DD-AR driving trailer but has electric motors and a single passenger deck on top; the level of this deck is higher than that of a regular single deck rail car, but lower than the upper deck of the other coaches. Three types of coaches are available: Bv (second class), ABv (first and second class) and Bvk (second class driving trailer). The DDM-2/3 series are being modernised from 2010–2013 and after modernisation the series was renamed as NID (Nieuwe Intercity Dubbeldekker).
- DDM-1: The first series of the DDM, DDM-1, was operated in fixed formations of 6 coaches, using an 1800 class locomotive for traction. The other part of the DDM series, DDM-2/3, will be modernized during 2010-2013 and after modernization will be renamed as DDZ. DDM-1 was withdrawn in September 2010 but reactivated in January 2011, due to a lack of trains, caused by harsh winter conditions.

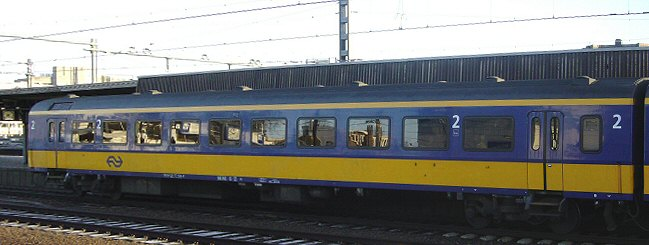
ICRm

- The ICRm carriages (Intercity Rijtuig = intercity carriage) were rebuilt from ICR coaches and were operated as trainsets on the high-speed line with a locomotive Class 186 at both ends.
- Koninklijk rijtuig (Dutch for Royal Carriage): an ICR modified specifically for use by the royal family. It was retired without replacement in 2023

== See also ==
- List of rail accidents in the Netherlands
- Railway stations in the Netherlands
- Rail transport in the Netherlands
