= DMS =

DMS may refer to:

== Science and technology ==
=== Computing ===
- Data Management System, component of VM/CMS
- Document management system
- Digital Media Server, a category within the Digital Living Network Alliance standard
- Disk Masher System, compression software for the Amiga computer
- Unisys DMS, a Unisys OS 2200 database
  - Unisys DMSII
- Digital Microsystems, Inc., an early microcomputer company
- Digital Multiplex System, a telephone exchange system
- Dealership management system, for car dealerships
- DMS Software Reengineering Toolkit, program transformation tools
- DMS-59, a video connector supporting two displays

=== Chemistry and materials science ===
- Differential mobility spectrometry in ion-mobility spectrometry–mass spectrometry
- Dilute magnetic semiconductor, semiconductors with magnetic properties
- Dimethyl sulfate, a methylating agent
- Dimethyl sulfide, an organosulfur compound
- N,N-Dimethylsphingosine
- Dimethylstilbestrol, a nonsteroidal estrogen

=== Other uses in science and technology ===
- Data management and sharing, an abbreviation used by the U.S. National Institutes of Health in connection with a policy on data management plans updated in 2023 (sharing.nih.gov)
- Dead man's switch
- Degree-Minute-Second, sexagesimal degree divisions
- Diagnostic medical sonography, in ultrasound imaging
- Distribution management system, of electrical energy
- Dynamic message sign, a variable-message traffic sign
- Delusional misidentification syndrome - a class of mental delusions, caused by various neurological diseases.
- Driver Monitoring System - monitors that the driver of a car is awake and alert

== Education ==
- Delft Management Society, a student society of Delft University of Technology, The Netherlands
- Doctor of Medical Science, a professional doctorate for physician assistants (post-nominal letters DMS or DMSc)
- Dartmouth Medical School
- Demonstration Multipurpose School (DMS), Mysore, India

== Military ==
- Decoration for Meritorious Services, South Africa until 1987
- Defence Medical Services, United Kingdom
- Defense Message System, in the United States Department of Defense
- Director Medical Services (UK), Army Medical Services
- Distinguished Military Service Medal, Papua New Guinea
- DMS, United States Navy hull classification symbol for a destroyer minesweeper
- DMS boots (for "direct moulded sole"), a type of military footwear
- DMS Maritime, providing services to the Australian navy

== Other uses ==
- Design Manufacture Service, an outsourcing business model
- Daimler/Leyland Fleetline London Transport double-decker bus prefix
- Diminishing manufacturing sources

== See also ==
- DM (disambiguation)
- DOMS (disambiguation)
