= 2DM =

2DM may refer to:

- Two dimensional (2-D, 2-Dm)
- two-dimensional materials (2DM, 2DMs)
- International Workshop on 1 & 2 Dimensional Magnetic Measurement and Testing (2DM, 1&2DM, 1DM)
- Saurer 2DM, a truck

== See also ==
- DM (disambiguation)
- DDM (disambiguation)
- DMDM or DMDM hydantoin
- Wing D-2M Derringer, training airplane
