= DOMS =

DOMS or doms or variant, may refer to:

- Delayed onset muscle soreness (DOMS)
- Doms, Domba or Doma, a Bengal Hindu caste
- Dom people, descendants of the Dom caste in West Asia and North Africa
- Department of Management Studies (DoMS)
  - DoMS NIT Trichy
  - Department of Management Studies, IIT Roorkee
  - Department of Management Studies IIT Madras
- Diploma in Ophthalmic Medicine and Surgery, medical degree in Bangladesh, India, England and Scotland
- Doms (company), a stationery manufacturing company in India

== People ==
- Jack Doms (1927–2018), New Zealand swimmer
- Jofré de Borja y Doms (1390–1436), Spanish noble
- Mark Doms, U.S. Under Secretary of Commerce for Economic Affairs
- Rodrigo de Borja y Doms (1431–1503), Pope Alexander VI

== See also ==
- Dom (disambiguation), "Doms" is the plural of "Dom"
- DMS (disambiguation)
- List of acronyms: D
