= Promate =

Taiwanese electronics company

- Company type: Private
- Industry: Consumer electronics; Technology
- Founded: 2004; 22 years ago in Taipei, Taiwan
- Headquarters: Shenzhen, Guangdong, China
- Area served: Worldwide
- Products: MFi Certified products, computer peripherals, mobile and smartphone accessories, USB products, power banks, universal power adaptors, audio devices, digital gadgets, LED and Solar lights and photography
- Number of employees: 563
- Website: www.promate.net

Promate is a Taiwanese electronics manufacturing company that develops mainly computing, communications and consumer electronics but also engages in the development, design and manufacturing of computer and mobile accessories. Promate produces personal computer peripherals, MFi certified product, mobile and smartphone accessories, USB products, power banks, universal power adaptors, audio devices, digital gadgets, LED, wired microphone and Solar lights and photography accessories. Founded in 2004, the company is headquartered right now in Shenzhen, China.

== History ==
Promate Technologies was founded in early 2004 in Taipei, Taiwan by a group of industry leaders working at ASUS, Foxconn, and Pegatron. The company later moved its headquarter to Shenzhen, China and set up its manufacturing facilities on a large scale.

In 2006, Promate established its first overseas branch office in Dubai – UAE to serve the Middle East and Africa region.

In 2008, Promate became an Apple MFi Certified brand with a dedicated R&D and Design center in Shenzhen-China.

In 2010, Promate established a fully-fledged branch office in Manila – Philippines to serve the South east Asia region.

In 2013, Promate established a fully-fledged branch office in London – United Kingdom.

== Products ==
Promate produces a variety of products. It mostly produces lifestyle technology accessories and peripherals ranging from smartphones, laptops to mobile car accessories. Its products also include power banks, chargers, speakers, earphones, headphones, universal power adaptors, bluetooth adaptors, card readers, mini projectors, cables, tripods, monopods, bag packs, wearable tech, selfie lights, LED lights, screen protectors, car holders, bike holders, iPhone cases, iPad cases, Macbook cases, travel kits etc.

== Operation ==
Promate operates in over 150 countries worldwide through offline distribution, retail and e-commerce channels.

== Awards and recognition ==
Promate has received a number of design and product awards that include;

- iF Product Design Award, Germany 2014–2018, (5 times)
- Japan RedDot Award in 2017
- CES Best Innovation Award 2015
- Retail Brand of year Award 2015
- Taiwan Excellence Awards, 2006–2014, (7 times)
- Distree EMEA Diamond Awards, 2018
- DISTREE Middle East Awards 2017 - Best Product Design
- EMEA Channel Academy 2014 Award - PC Accessories Vendor of the Year, nominated
- CES Innovation Awards Honorees, 2018
- Good Design Award (Japan), 2013 - Best Communication device
- Computex D&I Awards, 2013
- Taiwan Excellence Awards, 2009
- Business Channel Awards, 2012
- Brand of year Award 2016
- Business Channel Awards 2009
