= NS Class 400 =

Class of 15 Netherlands 0-4-0 diesel-electric locomotives

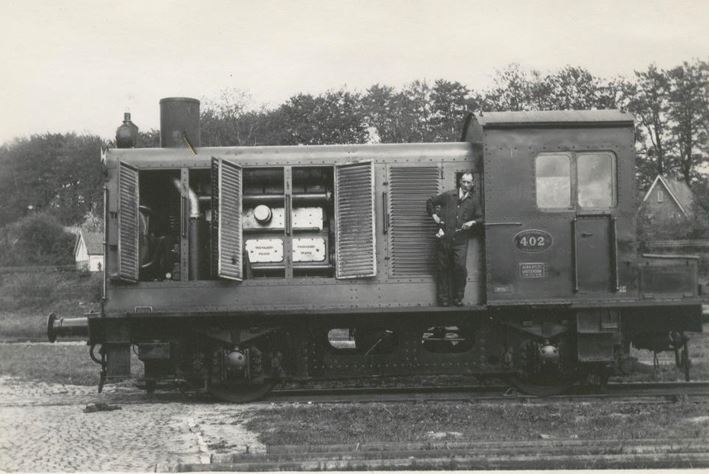
- Locomotive 402 with engine type 6Fa and Smit generator
Type and origin
- Power type: Diesel-electric
- Builder: Werkspoor
- Build date: 1947-1948
- Total produced: 15
Specifications
- Configuration
  - UIC: B
  - Commonwealth: Bo
- Gauge: 1,435 mm (4 ft 8 1/2 in)
- Length
  - Over buffers: 8.9 m (29 ft 2 in)
- Axle load: 18.5 t (18.2 long tons; 20.4 short tons)
- Loco weight: 37 t (36 long tons; 41 short tons)
Performance figures
- Maximum speed: 75 km/h (47 mph)
- Power output: 250 hp (190 kW)
Career
- Operators: Nederlandse Spoorwegen
- Numbers: 401-415
- Withdrawn: 1958-1961
- Disposition: All scrapped

The Nederlandse Spoorwegen (NS) Class 400 was a derivative of the successful Class 200, also built for shunting duties. They were larger than their predecessors, and were built by Werkspoor in 1947. They were called "Grote Siks" (big goats). Unlike their predecessors, they were generally unsuccessful and in 10 years were replaced by the larger Series 500 and 600.
