= DM =

DM, Dm, dm, or D.M. may refer to:

== Academic titles and postnominals ==
- Doctor of Management, an academic management degree
- Doctor of Medicine, commonly known as M.D. but archaically abbreviated as D.M.
- Doctor of Music, an academic music-performance degree, also known as DMA

== Arts, entertainment, and media ==
=== Broadcasting ===
- Danger Mouse (1981 TV series), a British animated television series
- WWDM, a radio station licensed to Sumter, South Carolina, US

=== Gaming ===
- Deathmatch (video games), a gameplay mode integrated into first-person shooter computer games
- Dungeon Master, the game designer, storyteller and referee in Dungeons & Dragons

=== Music ===
- D minor, a minor scale or chord
- DM (album), 2017, by Mexican singer Dulce María
- "DM" (song), 2022, by fromis_9
- Dance marathon, a multiple-day charity event on U.S. college campuses
- Depeche Mode, an English synthpop band formed in 1980
- Drum major (marching band), the leader of a marching band
- Death Metal, an extreme subgenre of heavy metal music

=== Social media ===
- Digital marketing
- Direct message

== In business and economics ==
- Deutsche Mark (1948–2002), the former currency of Germany (and West Germany)
  - East German mark (1951–1990)

== Companies and products ==
- Detroit and Mackinac Railway
- dm-drogerie markt, a German drugstore chain
- Dr. Martens, a brand of boots
- Arajet (IATA code "DM")
- Maersk Air, a former Danish airline which operated from 1969 until 2005 (then IATA code "DM")

== Military ==
- Designated marksman, a soldier fulfilling the marksman role in an infantry squad
- Royal Naval Armaments Depot, Defense Munitions, sites are prefixed DM
- A US Navy hull classification symbol: Light minelayer (DM)

== Places ==
- Davis–Monthan Air Force Base, Tucson, Arizona, US
- Des Moines, Iowa, the state capital
- Dominica, an island nation in the Caribbean Sea (ISO 3166-1 alpha-2 code: DM)
- Gorontalo (vehicle registration prefix DM)

== Science, technology, and mathematics ==
=== Computing ===
==== Software ====
- Display Manager, a window system for Domain/OS on Apollo/Domain workstations
- Device mapper, a component of the Linux kernel that supports logical volume management
- X display manager, a graphical login manager

==== Other uses in computing ====
- .dm, Dominica's top-level Internet domain
- Dimensional modeling, a set of techniques and concepts used in data warehouse design

=== Medicine ===
- Degenerative myelopathy, a condition in dogs affecting the spinal cord
- Diabetes mellitus, a disease characterized by high blood sugar
- Difference due to memory, a neural activity effect
- Diminished motivation, a condition characterized by lack of motivation
- Double minute, fragments of extrachromosomal DNA in human tumors
- Myotonic dystrophy (DM-1/2/3), a chronic muscle-wasting disease
- n-Decyl β-D-Maltopyranoside, a maltoside detergent used when purifying membrane proteins
- Dermatomyositis, an inflammatory systemic disorder affecting the skin, muscles, and other organs

=== Physics ===
- Dark matter, in cosmology, hypothetical non-luminous matter
- Deformable mirror
- Dispersion measure, the amount of dispersion of radio waves by interstellar medium

=== Units of length ===
- Decimetre (dm), equal to ten centimetres
- Decametre (sometimes Dm), equal to ten metres
- Data mile (DM), in radar, equal to 6000 feet

=== Other uses in science, technology and mathematics ===
- Adamsite, a chemical agent used in riot control
- Differential Manchester encoding
- Distributed morphology, a theoretical framework in linguistics

== Sports and recreation ==
- Dallas Mavericks, an NBA team
- Danske Mesterskaber, the Danish Athletics Championships
- Defensive midfielder, an association football position
- Divemaster, in scuba diving

== Other uses ==
- De minimis, a Latin legal term
- Diis Manibus, a Latin epitaphial acronym
- SJ Dm3, and Dm, Swedish locomotives
- District magistrate, senior local role in the Indian Administrative Service

== See also ==
- DMS (disambiguation)
- MD (disambiguation)
