= NS Class 200 =

Class of Dutch small shunting locomotives

Class 200
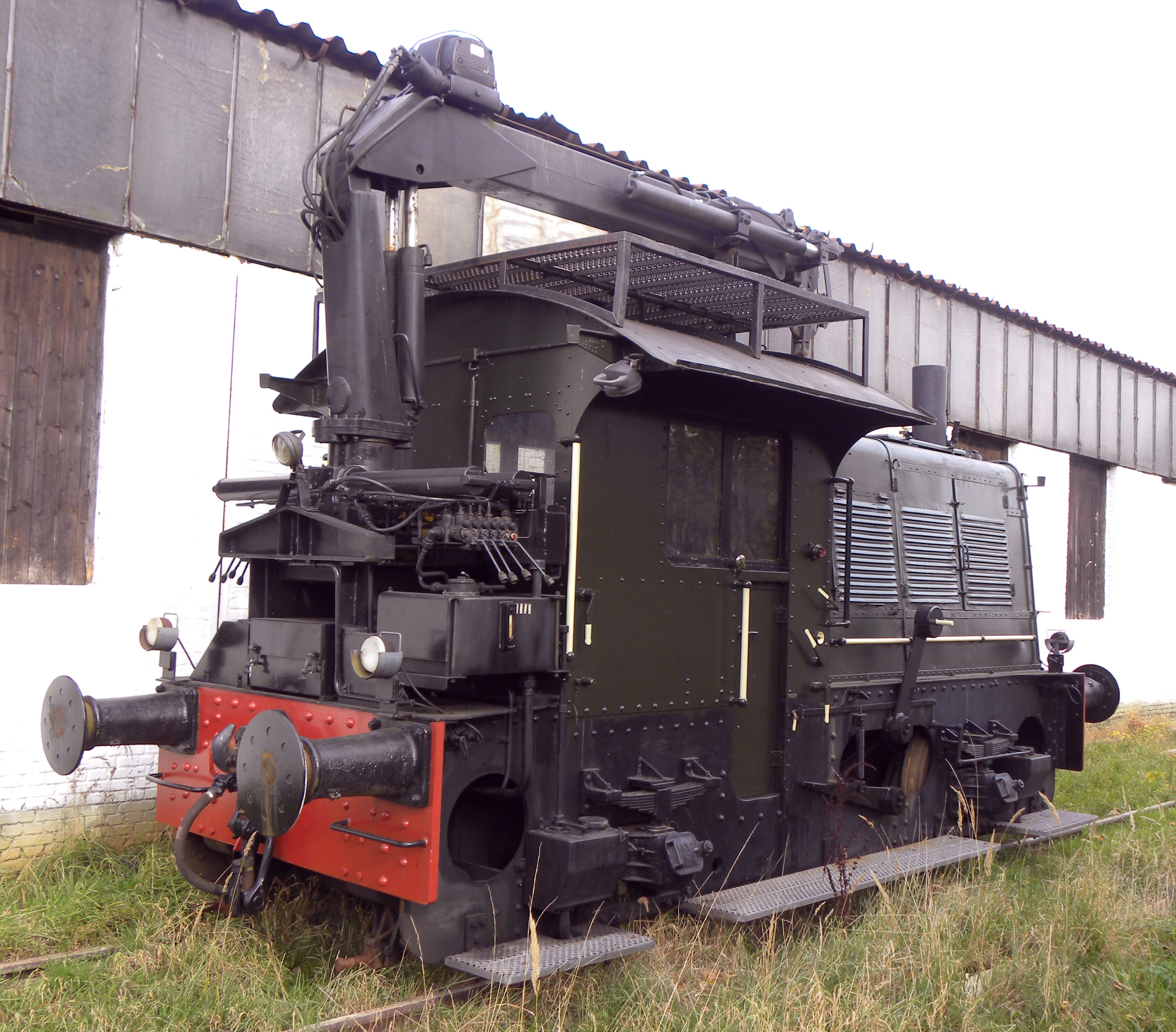
- Preserved Class 200 locomotive with crane, probably no. 246.
Type and origin
- Power type: Diesel
- Builder: Werkspoor
- Build date: 1934 - 1951
- Total produced: 169
Specifications
- Configuration
  - AAR: B
- Gauge: 1,435 mm (4 ft 8 1/2 in) standard gauge
Career
- Nicknames: "Sik" and "locomotor"
- Retired: 2008

The Nederlandse Spoorwegen (NS) Class 200 diesel locomotives were built for shunting duties. 169 of these small locomotives, numbered 201–369, were built by Werkspoor from 1934–1951. They were known as "Sik" (Sik in singular, goats) by rail enthusiasts and "locomotor" by railway staff. Fifteen of these locomotives were rebuilt with a retractable crane. The few locomotives in active service were retired in 2008 after new Dutch personnel safety regulations prevented NS from using them any longer. Most were no longer active at that time.

This locomotive was mainly operated as a shunter, although they were active on a few remote branch lines.

== Technique ==
The design and operation was based on the simplest of things, which in effect made them very reliable. The locomotive was operated by design from the outside (side of engine) and wasn't equipped with a dead man device to stop the locomotive automatically in case of incapacity of the operator. There were two manual brakes: a handle and a foot brake. As the handle could be moved by in-train forces while dead-heading it was required to be fixed by a nut and bolt. Upon taking the locomotive into service again, it was necessary to loosen the nut and bolt. In some cases, this was forgotten, and the result was that the operator couldn't brake; many Siks have suffered collision damage due to this.

A special design was implemented for coolant; the fuel tank with diesel was also the coolant for the engine. The theory was that the coolant would never be exhausted while the locomotive is in use.

The locomotive didn't have an air pressure system. To obtain a whistle a device was put on top of the exhaust to use the flow of exhaust gases as the whistle air. This resulted in a very characteristic whistle sound (to imitate the sound, whistle a high-pitched tone while making a rolling R sound).

== Preservation ==
Of all locomotives of the NS 200 series, many have been preserved in either a running condition at heritage railway lines, for spare parts or as a static object. Out of the 169 locomotives build, 80 were lost during the 2nd World War or scrapped.

One can find a H0 scale model offered in various liveries by Roco.

== Gallery ==
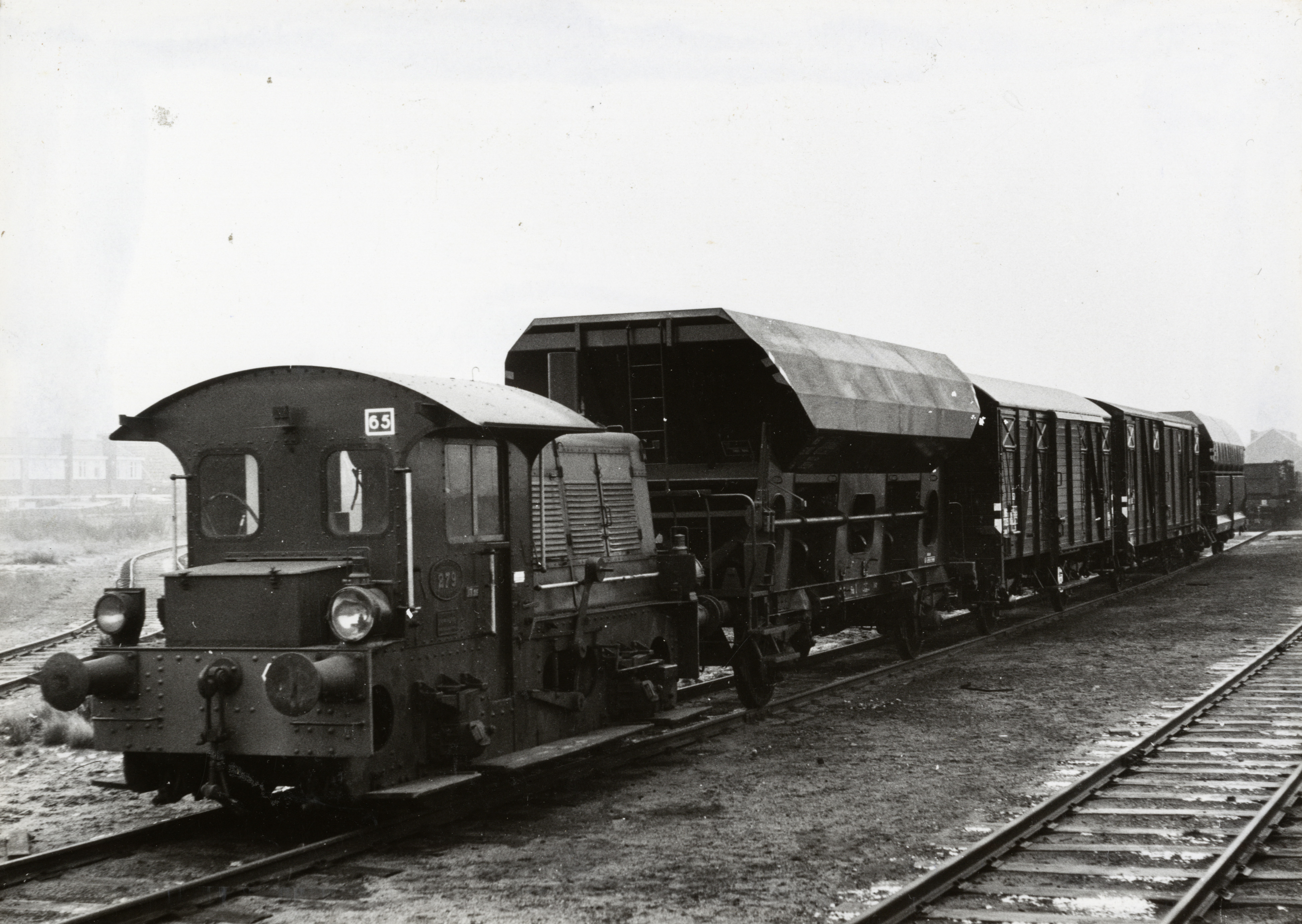
Goods train pulled by Locomotor No. 279, in the railyard in Amersfoort; 1961.

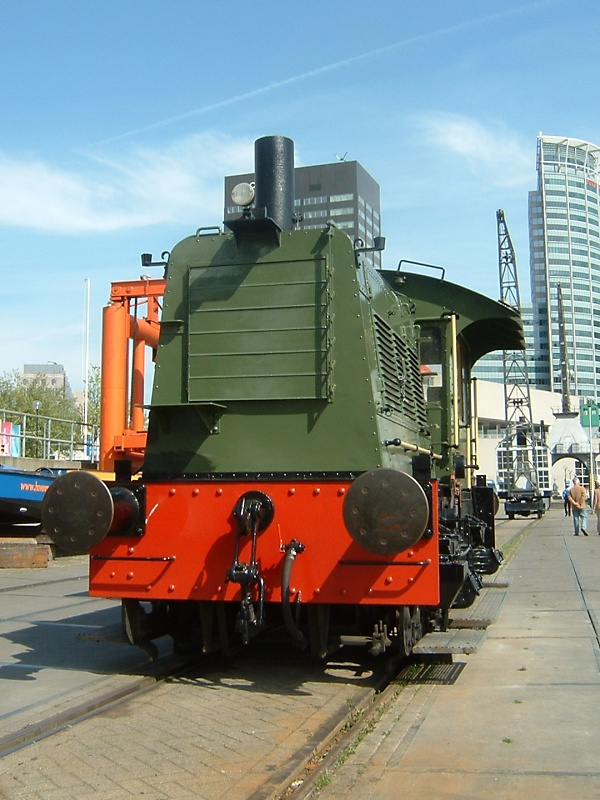
NS Class 200 No. 347 in the Maritime Museum Rotterdam.

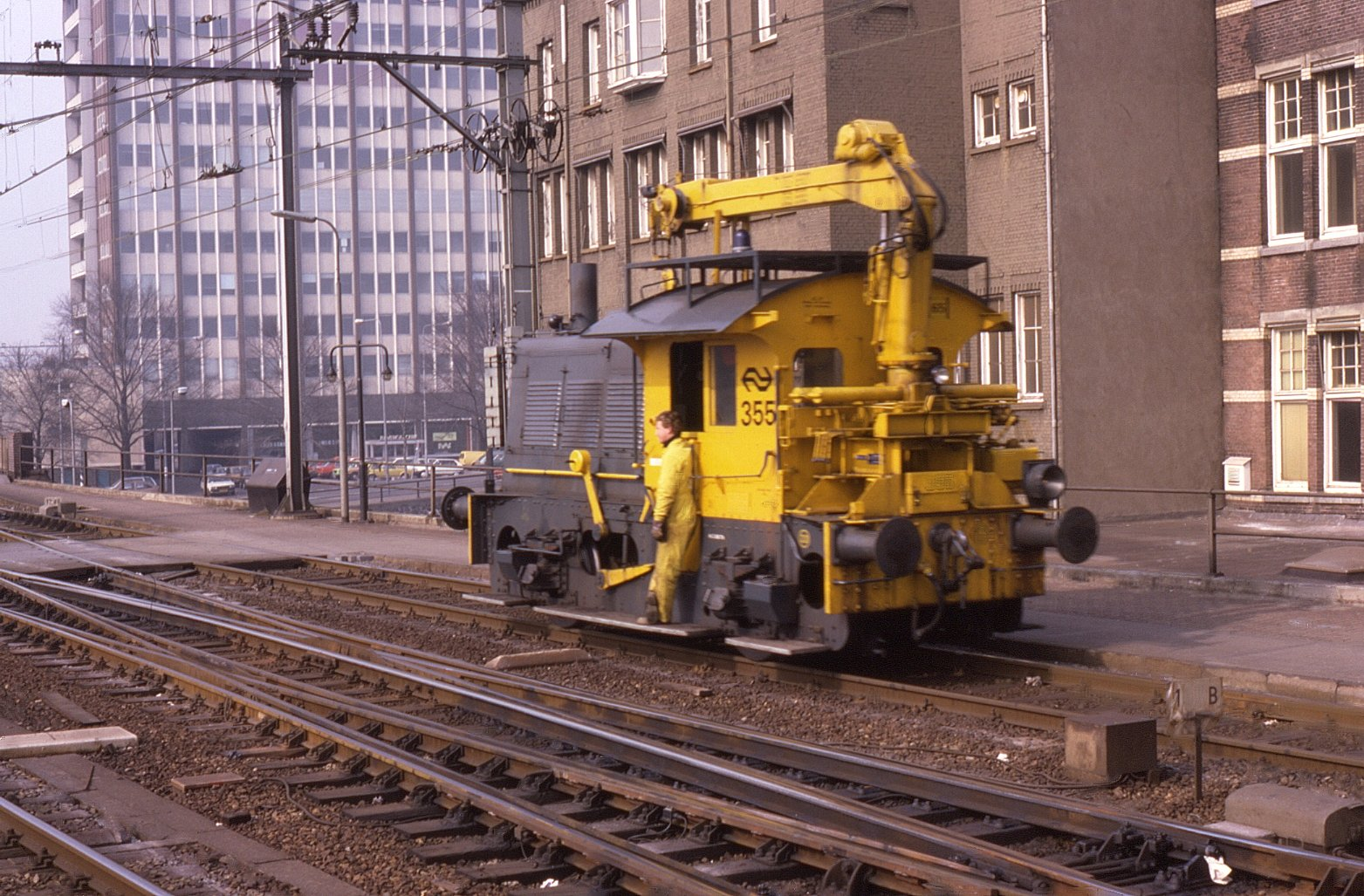
Kraansik locomotor No. 355 in Station Amsterdam Centraal; 1986.

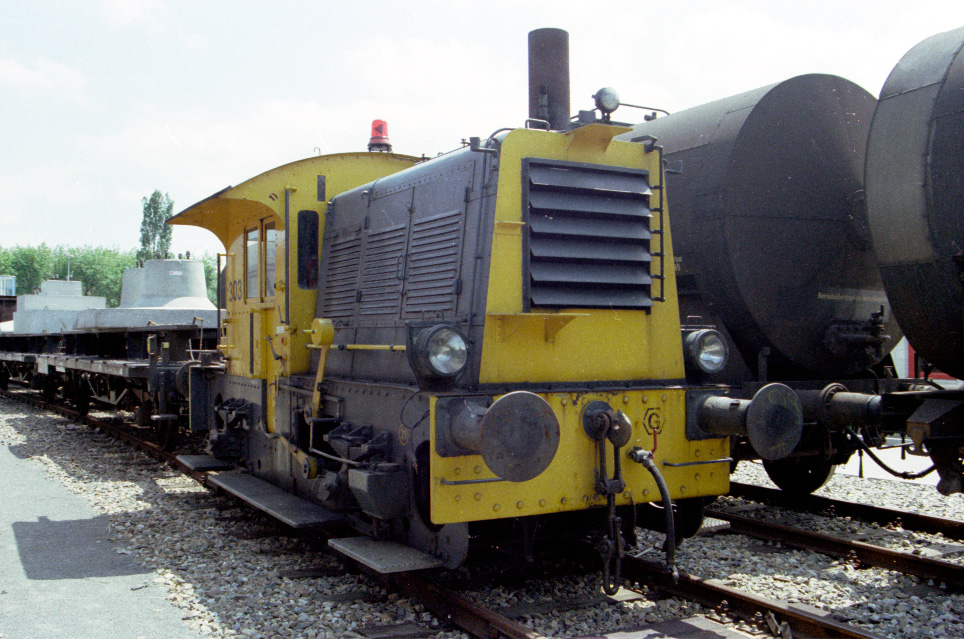
Locomotor NS 303.

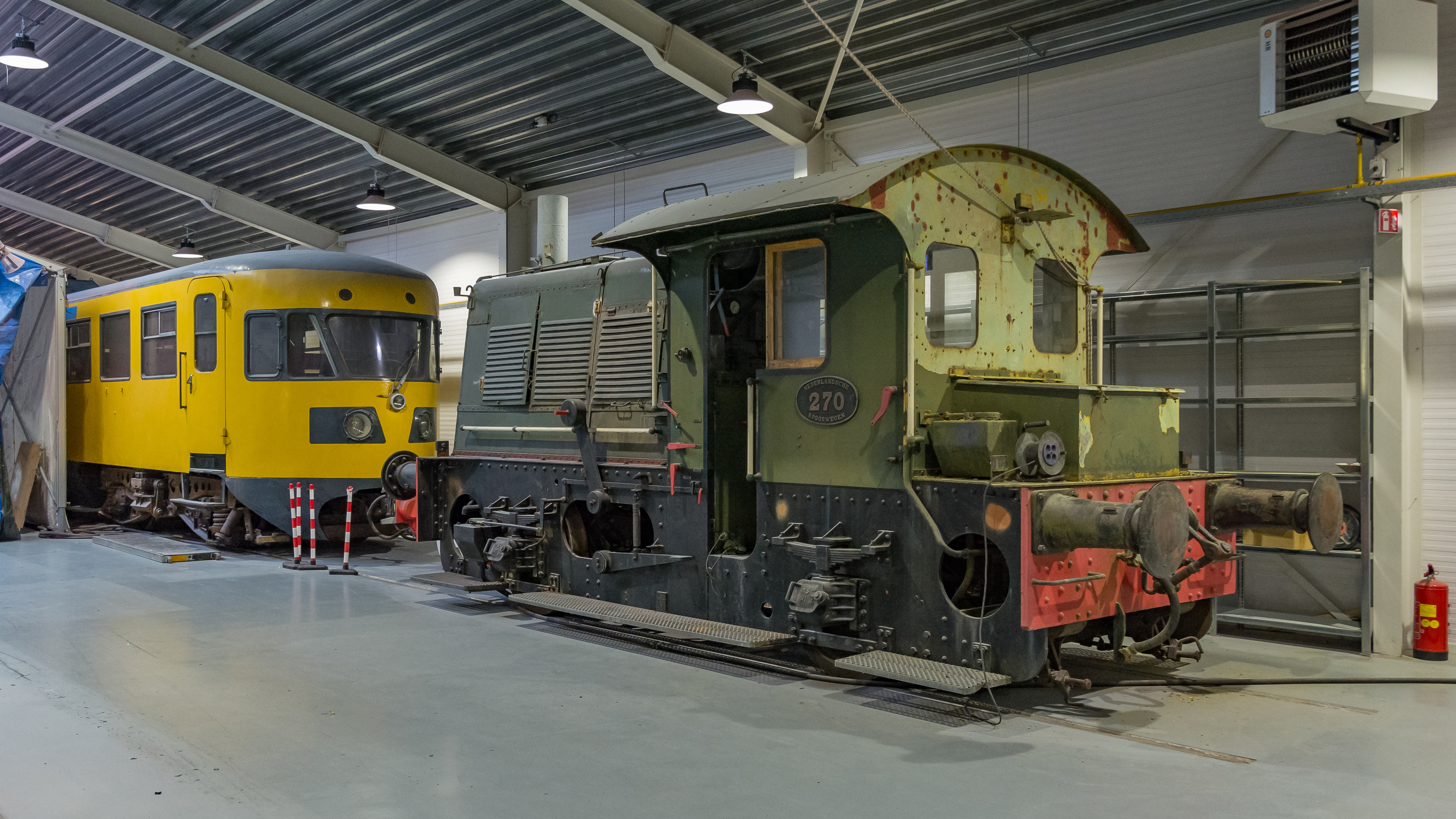
NS Class 200 No. 347 in Transit Oost in Winterswijk. Behind it multiple unit DE-2 186; 20 June 2017.
