= Department of Management Studies IIT Madras =

Business school in India

The Department of Management Studies of IIT Madras, also known as DoMS, IIT Madras is a business school affiliated with the Indian Institute of Technology Madras in Chennai, India.

== History ==
IIT Madras was established in 1959. The Department of Humanities and Social Sciences at IIT Madras has offered management education as an M. Tech. (Industrial Engineering) since 1959. The department started the MBA in 2001. The Department of Management Studies came into existence in April 2004.

== Programs ==
The department offers MBA, PGPEX-VLM, MS, and PhD degrees.

=== MBA ===
The MBA program is a two-year program structured with courses spread over seven quarters and about five to six courses per quarter. The first year contains core courses that are compulsory for all students, whereas the second year mostly has electives and a few core courses. During the summer break between the first and second years, students work on a summer project with a company.

Apart from regular academics, course activities include auditing courses, field visits, participating in management workshops, organizing professional events, and working on live business projects. The program includes three core courses on industrial and business domains over the last three quarters.

Students of the program can opt for auditing courses (i.e. taking classes but not assignments or exams and not receiving credits) from any of the elective courses offered by the Department of Management Studies or from the more than 300 courses offered by the other 14 departments in the institute.

Co-curricular courses offered at the department include business communication and presentation skills, negotiation skills, teamwork and conflict resolution skills, time management, business etiquette, and foreign languages (primarily German).

The batch size is 60 to 70 students, picked from over 250,000 applicants who take the Common Admission Test (CAT) conducted by the Indian Institutes of Management, followed by a Group Task/Personal interview session later on. Until 2011, admission was based on the Joint Management Entrance Test (JMET) conducted by the IITs and Indian Institute of Science in rotation. From the academic year 2012, JMET is replaced with the Common Admission Test.

=== PGPEX-VLM ===
The Postgraduate programme for executives for visionary leadership in manufacturing (PGPEX-VLM) is a year-long joint program of IIM Calcutta, IIT Kanpur, and IIT Madras.

It is an initiative of the National Manufacturing Competitiveness Council, the Government of India, for the career development/advancement of engineers/ executives with work experience. The PGPEX-VLM program was designed by the IIM Calcutta, IIT Kanpur, and IIT Madras in consultation with industry, the Confederation of Indian Industry, the Japanese International Cooperation Agency (JICA), NMCC, and MHRD. The government of Japan extends cooperation to support the transfer of Japanese expertise and visits to manufacturing centers of excellence in Japan for the PGPEX-VLM Programs through JICA.

Selection of candidates is made on the basis of academic background, which has to be first division/first class from school (SLC/ Madhyamik) board examination level to graduation level, relevant work experience, employer’s recommendations, performance in the aptitude test and personal interview conducted jointly by IIMC, IITK, and IITM. For self-sponsored candidates, a minimum of four and a half years to a maximum of ten years of work experience in manufacturing and related sectors is mandatory. For sponsored candidates, the upper limit on maximum experience of 10 years is waived. Approximate batch size is 35-40.

=== MS ===
DoMS IIT Madras offers two categories of the MS program:

- The Master of Science (in Research) program is characterized by a research component in the curriculum. The program prepares the student to conduct managerially relevant research in management areas.
- The Master of Science (in Entrepreneurship) exposes students to entrepreneurial opportunities and requires them to design and test the commercial viability of products/processes or business models and services that could eventually be commercialized.

=== Ph.D in Management ===
In research, it is ranked as the top public school in India. Prof Rajendran C. It has been ranked 15th among the top 20 h-index POM (production & operation management) researchers worldwide in the last 50 years (1959-2008), with an h-index of 21. Another faculty member, Dr. Arshinder Kaur, received highly commended Emerald/EFMD Doctoral Awards 2008 for her doctoral thesis in the Logistics and supply chain management category. Regarding research productivity in the production and operations management area, the Indian Institute of Technology has been ranked in the top 20 institutes in the world.

Doctoral research at DoMS IIT Madras has won international awards and funding. In 2007, Dr. Sandhya Shekhar's doctoral thesis won the Emerald/EFMD Outstanding Doctoral Research Award in the Knowledge Management category. In 2011, Dr. K. Gopalakrishnan's doctoral dissertation and Dr. Priya Nair's were highly commended Emerald/EFMD Doctoral Awards 2011 in the "Knowledge Management" and "Management & Governance" categories, respectively. In 2009, doctoral student Arti Kalro won "The Emerald/AIMA Indian Management Research Fund Award" for the theme "Understanding and addressing cataract-related eye care issues in rural Tamil Nadu."

The department offers PhD in finance, general management, HR and OB, marketing, operations, strategic management, systems and IT management, and technology management area. The requirements for PhD admission are:

- A master's degree in an eligible discipline with a good academic record
- Qualification in CAT/AIMA/GATE/UGC-NET JRF or Lectureship or equivalent.
- Candidates with at least five years of managerial experience are also eligible in lieu of the qualifying test.

== Rankings ==
Institute rankings

Business/Management – India
- NIRF (2022): 10

The Department of Management Studies, IIT Madras, was ranked 10th amongst management schools in India by the National Institutional Ranking Framework (NIRF) in 2022.

== Extracurricular ==
- DoMS Day Out, is an intra-departmental sporting event held every year during March–April.
- DoMS Cricket League. In February, 2011 the 5th edition of DCL (DCL 5.0) was conducted. Unlike the normal cricket formats each team has only seven players (five males + two girls compulsory)+ one substitute player.

Other activities include the Teacher's Day event, Hostel Day event, industrial visits, class trips, and Outbound at Dawn.

== Events ==
=== Samanvay ===
Samanvay is the annual National Business School Fest of the IIT Madras. It is organized by MBA students at the Department of Management Studies. Each year, Samanvay revolves around a theme. Samanvay 2010 was inaugurated by Mr K. Ananth Krishnan, Chief Technology Officer, Tata Consultancy Services. Some recurring events are business plan contests, panel discussions by industry experts, online quizzing, and finance, marketing, operations, HR, and consulting events.

=== ICON ===
ICON or the Inter-Corporate Outbound National Championship, is a sporting event organized by DoMS, IITM, for the corporate community. Teams from across the country compete to demonstrate their teamwork and leadership skills in a fun, informal way.

== Student initiatives and interfaces ==
Some of them are listed below. shmi Narayanan (CEO & President, Cognizant Technologies Solutions)

=== CEO Connect ===
In CEO Connect, business leaders are invited to the campus to share their experiences. The event's essence is to provide the students with an opportunity to get a perspective from the industry captains.

=== Corporate Wisdom ===
Managers are invited to lectures and workshops.

=== Management Insights for Social Transformation (MIST) ===
Management Insights for Social Transformation (MIST) is a department forum that invites philanthropists who have reached out to society to share their experiences and enrich the students' attitudes towards society.

=== MBA Invitational Lecture Series (MILS) ===
Started in 2011, the Invitation Lecture Series initiative is a lecture event.

=== DoMS Interface (DI) ===
DoMS INTERFACE is an initiative to develop a forum whose objective is to be a program communication link to the outside world, including the corporate world, prospective students, alumni, and media.

== Collaborations ==
=== Mannheim Business School, Germany ===
The department has a Memorandum of Understanding with Mannheim Business School, Germany, for student and faculty exchange. Students at either university take courses from the other for a semester.

=== Indian School of Business ===
In November 2007, DoMS, IIT Madras & and the Indian School of Business (ISB) inked a pact for collaborative research.

=== Other MOUs for Student Exchange ===
The institute supports collaboration between other universities at the national and international levels. DoMS involves itself by facilitating student and faculty exchange programs across universities. Other universities and organizations DoMS has an MoU with are:

- Deggendorf University of Applied Sciences, Germany
- European Business School, Wiesbaden, Germany
- Hof University of Applied Sciences, Germany
- Indian School of Business, Hyderabad
- Karlsruhe Institute of Technology, Germany
- Kyushu University, Fukuoka, Japan
- Management Centre, Innsbruck, Austria
- RWTH Aachen University, Germany
- Sauder Business School, University of British Columbia, Canada
- Seoul National University, Korea
- T U Hamburg, Germany
- Technical University of Munich, Germany
- Technische Universität Darmstadt, Germany
- University of Bremen, Germany
- University of Duisburg-Essen, Germany
- University of Passau, Germany

=== Notable alumni ===
Chirag Jain, Founder, Get My Parking
