= Allan of Rotterdam =

Allan & Co
- Company type: Subsidiary
- Industry: Rail transport
- Founded: 1839; 187 years ago
- Defunct: 1959
- Fate: Defunct/Ceased Operations
- Headquarters: Rotterdam, Netherlands
- Area served: Worldwide
- Products: Locomotives; High-speed trains Intercity and commuter trains Trams; People movers Signalling systems

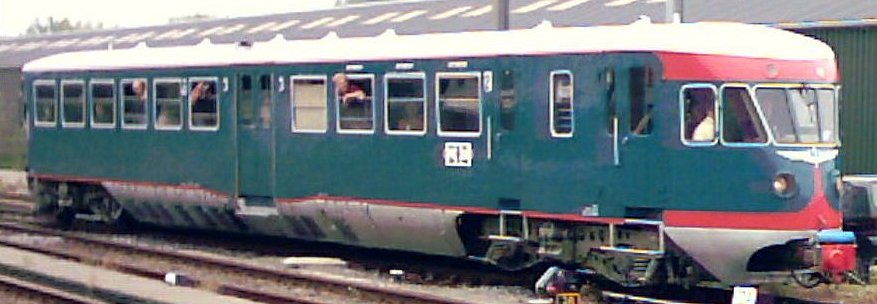
A "Blue Angel" railcar built in 1953 for the Netherlands Railways, photographed at Hoorn, September 2006

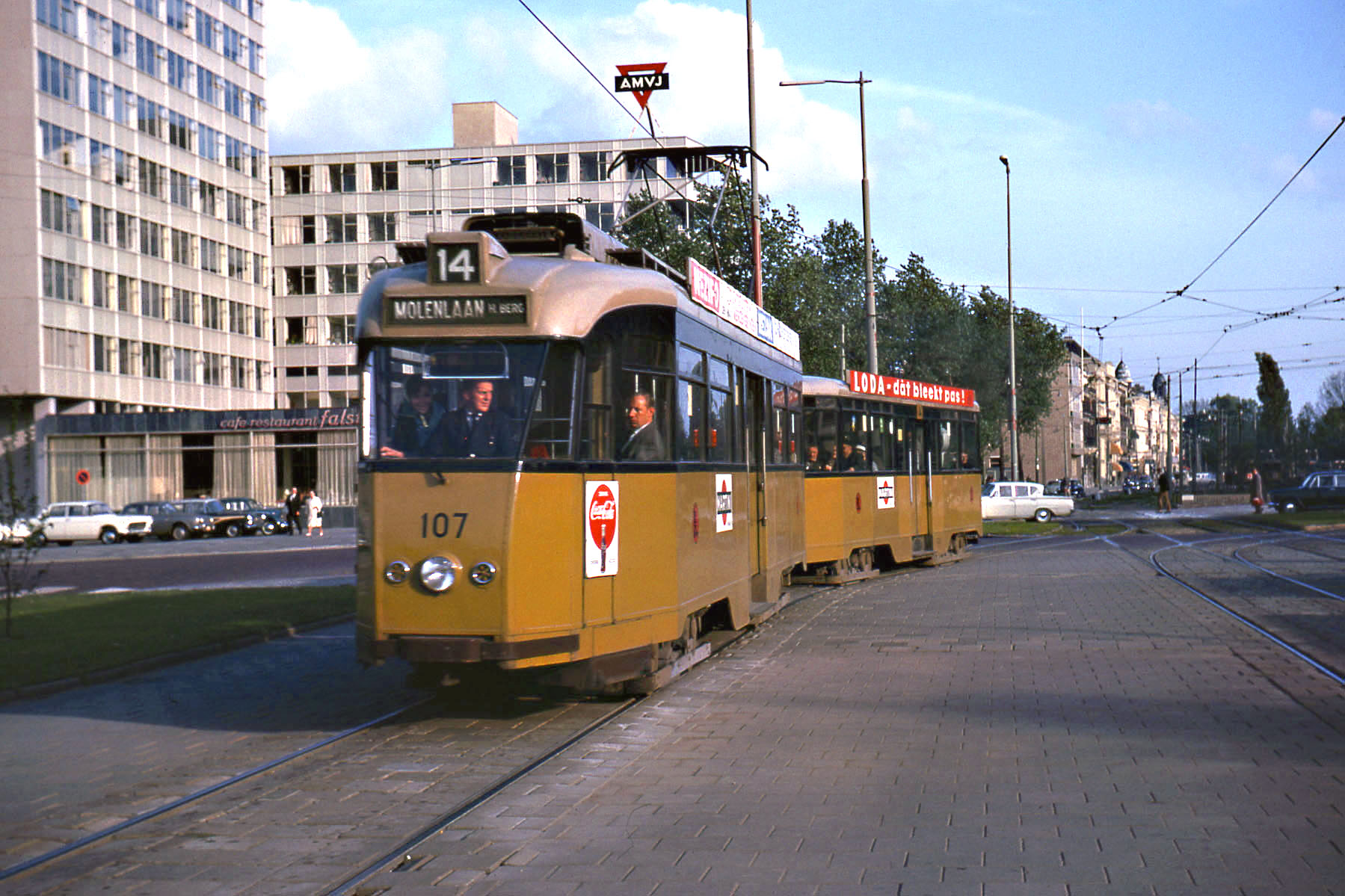
Trams in Rotterdam built by Allan & Co in the late 1940s

Allan & Co was a former railway rolling stock and tram manufacturer based in Rotterdam, Netherlands. The full name of the company (in Dutch) was Allan & Co's Koninklijke Nederlandsche Fabrieken van Meubelen en Spoorwegmaterieel N.V. The company ceased business in 1959.

The company was founded in 1839 and started as a furniture maker. The first trams were built in 1902 and the first railway carriages in 1910. Allan went on to become a major supplier to the Netherlands Railways, including the Plan X Blue Angel diesel trains. The company also built rolling stock for export, such as the Class 0300 railcars for the Portuguese Railways in addition to 16 passenger cars for Uruguay (AFE State Railways) in 1951.
