= Delft Management Society =

DMS
- Delft Management Society
- Type: Dutch Students Organisation
- Location: Netherlands
- Website: http://www.dmssociety.tudelft.nl/

The Delft Management Society (DMS) is a student organization independent of any educational institution that acts as a bridge between students and the corporate world. The society is focused on the academic, career and social development of Delft University of Technology students. The society is based in Delft, Netherlands. The society has partners at multiple universities worldwide.

The society is an interfaculty initiative and provides an international platform for the exchange, foreign and Dutch Delft University of Technology students (15,321 students). DMS provides all students in Delft with the opportunity to manage their own projects or events. This is guided by a board consisting of four students.
