= Data diffusion machine =

Data diffusion machine (DDM) is a historical virtual shared memory architecture where data is free to migrate through the machine.

Shared memory machines are convenient for programming but do not scale beyond tens of processors. The DDM overcomes this problem by providing a virtual memory abstraction on top of a distributed memory machine. A DDM appears to the user as a conventional shared memory machine but is implemented using a distributed memory architecture.

Data diffusion machines were under active research in the late 1980s and early 1990s, but the research has ceased since then.
