= Vossloh G 400 B =

Diesel-hydraulic shunting locomotive

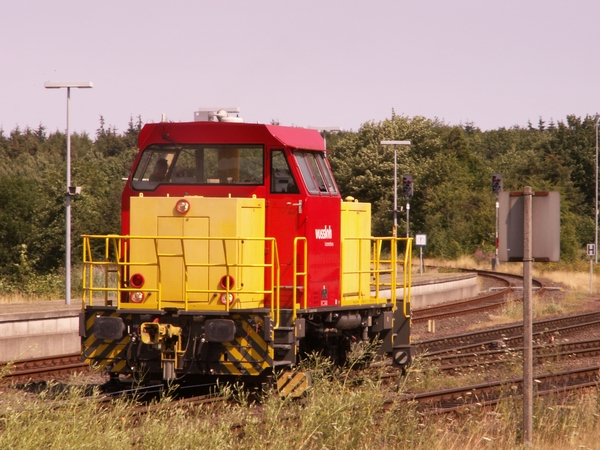
- Leased G400B in service for Nord-Ost-Bahn
Type and origin
- Power type: Diesel-hydraulic
- Builder: (Germany) Vossloh, Kiel
- Build date: 2003–2004
- Total produced: 19
Specifications
- Configuration
  - UIC: B'
- Gauge: 1,435 mm (4 ft 8 1/2 in)
- Wheel diameter: 1.000 m (3 ft 3.4 in) (new)
- Minimum curve: 50 m (164 ft 1 in)
- Length: 9.4 m (30 ft 10 in)*; 9.645 m (31 ft 7.7 in)**
- Width: 3.1 m (10 ft 2 in)
- Height: 4.5 m (14 ft 9 in)
- Loco weight: 40 t (39 long tons; 44 short tons)
- Fuel capacity: 1,000 L (220 imp gal; 260 US gal)
- RPM range: 2100 rpm
- Engine type: MTU 8V 183 TD13
- Transmission: Voith L2r4zseU2
Performance figures
- Maximum speed: 70 km/h (43 mph)*; 40 km/h (25 mph)**
- Power output: 390 kW (520 hp)
Career
- Locale: Germany, Netherlands
- Disposition: in service
- * standard locomotive ** NedTrain class 700

The Vossloh G400B is a B diesel-hydraulic shunting locomotive. The G400B is technically identical to the G322, except for some details like different final drives. It was renamed as G400B to fit in the new numbering scheme used in the 4th generation programme.

== Operations ==
Vossloh built 6 stock locomotives for leasing, used by different operators. Four locomotives were eventually sold to leasing company northrail.

A second batch of 13 locomotives was built for Dutch train maintenance company NedTrain. These locomotives are slightly longer due to the fitting of extra coupling equipment, and are used to shunt trains around their workshops. These locomotives were purchased by Nederlandse Spoorwegen's Irish subsidiary, NS Financial Services Company, for approximately €11.5 million to "reduce its tax liability" in the Netherlands, and then leased them back to NS.

== See also ==
- VSFT G 322, same type but built before Vossloh's takeover.
