= Blue Angel (train) =

Class of 1- and 2-car diesel railcars formerly used by Nederlandse Spoorwegen

NS DE-1/DE-2
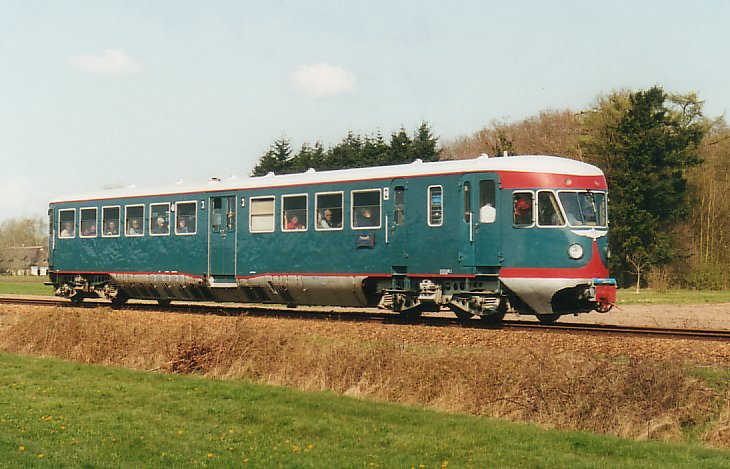
- Preserved DE-1 41 near Groot Dochteren

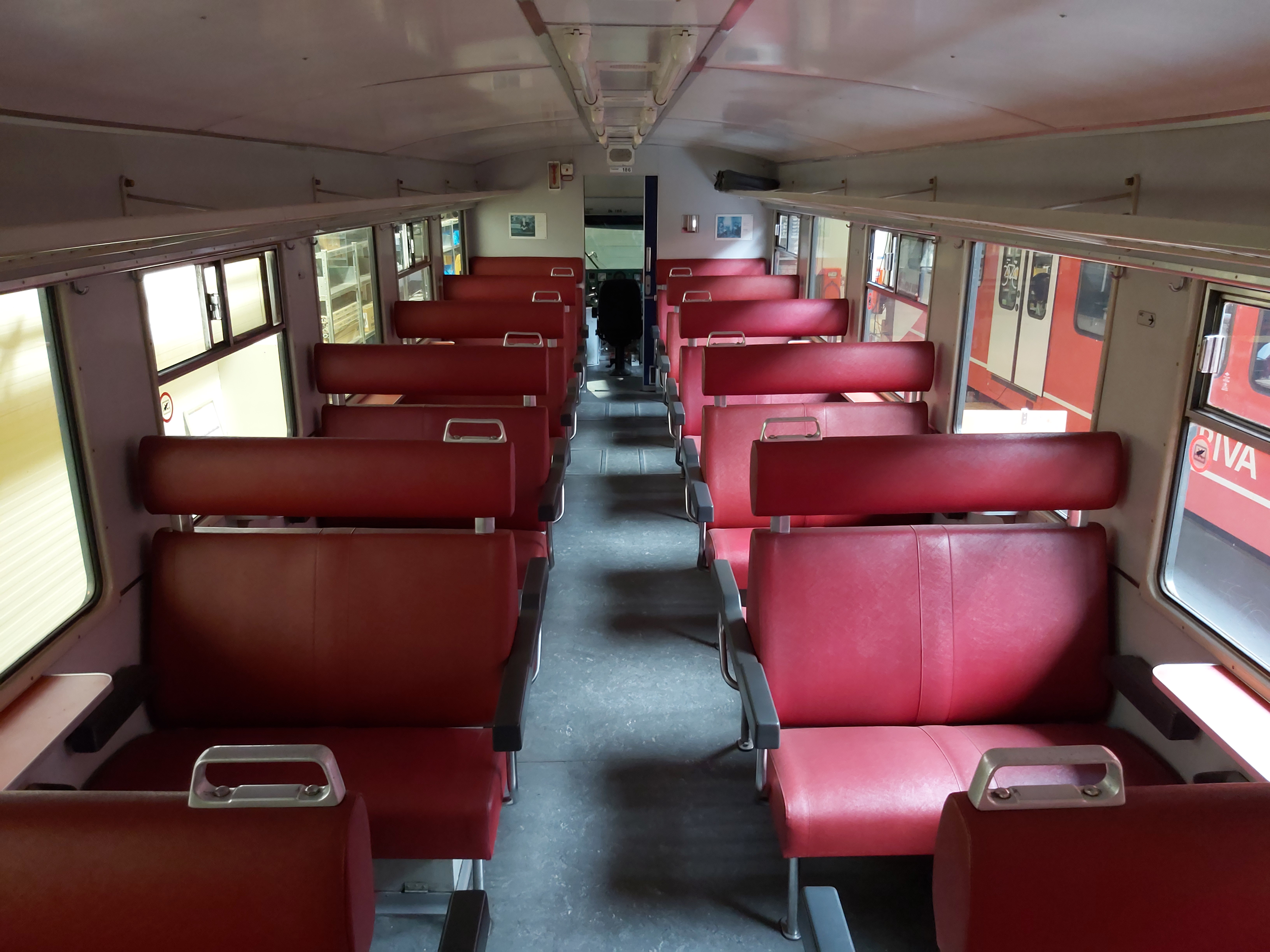
- Interior of refurbished DE-2 186
- In service: DE-1: 1953-1985; DE-2: 1953-2002
- Manufacturers: Allan of Rotterdam, Werkspoor, AEC, Cummins
- Constructed: DE-1: 1953-1955; DE-2: 1953-1954
- Entered service: 1953
- Refurbished: DE-2: 1975-1981
- Scrapped: 1979-2002
- Number built: DE-1: 30; DE-2: 46
- Number preserved: DE-1: 1 DE-2: 4
- Successor: Wadloper DMU; NS DM 90
- Formation: DE-1: 1 car per set ABD; DE-2: 2 cars per set ABk + BDk
- Fleet numbers: DE-1: 21-50; DE-2: 61-106; Refurbished DE-2: 161-186
- Capacity: DE-1: 1st class: 8; 2nd class: 65; DE-2: 1st class: 28; 2nd class: 105
- Operators: Nederlandse Spoorwegen; Oostnet; Syntus

Specifications
- Train length: DE-1: 27.05 m (88 ft 9 in); DE-2: 45.40 m (148 ft 11 1/2 in)
- Width: 2.78 m (9 ft 1 1/2 in)
- Height: 3.45 m (11 ft 3 3/4 in)
- Wheelbase: Bogie: 3.0 m (9 ft 10 in); Bogie centers: 18.35 m (60 ft 2 1/2 in)
- Maximum speed: 105 km/h (65 mph)
- Weight: DE-1: 57 t (56 long tons; 63 short tons); DE-2: 85 t (84 long tons; 94 short tons)
- UIC classification: DE-1: Bo'Bo'; DE-2: Bo'2'Bo'
- Coupling system: Scharfenberg
- Multiple working: Up to three units of the same class
- Track gauge: 1,435 mm (4 ft 8 1/2 in) standard gauge

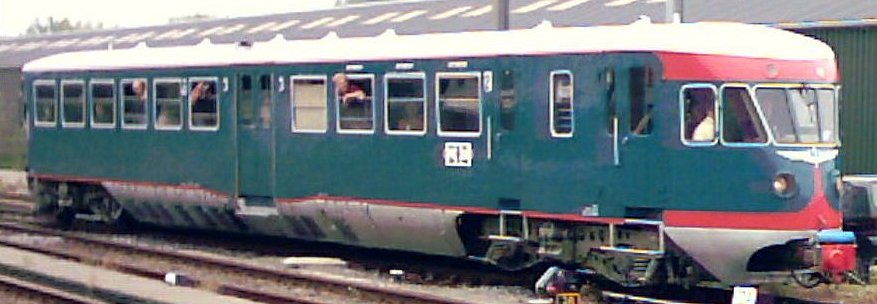
Hoorn, September 2006

The Blue Angel (in Dutch: Blauwe Engel) was the name given to the Plan X class DE-1 and DE-2 diesel railcars formerly used by Nederlandse Spoorwegen. There have been rumours that the name has a connection to the German movie Der blaue Engel, but this has never been confirmed.

The class DE-1 DMUs were single-car DMUs, while the DE-2s had two (articulated) carriages. They were extensively used on branch lines in Friesland as well as on other non-electrified secondary routes. They also operated the Maastricht-Liège shuttle. Originally painted blue (hence the nickname), they were later repainted dark red. They were largely replaced by new Wadloper DMUs in the 1980s. 26 DE-2s were refurbished from 1975 to 1981 and repainted into yellow NS livery, but the DE-1s retained the dark red livery until withdrawal.

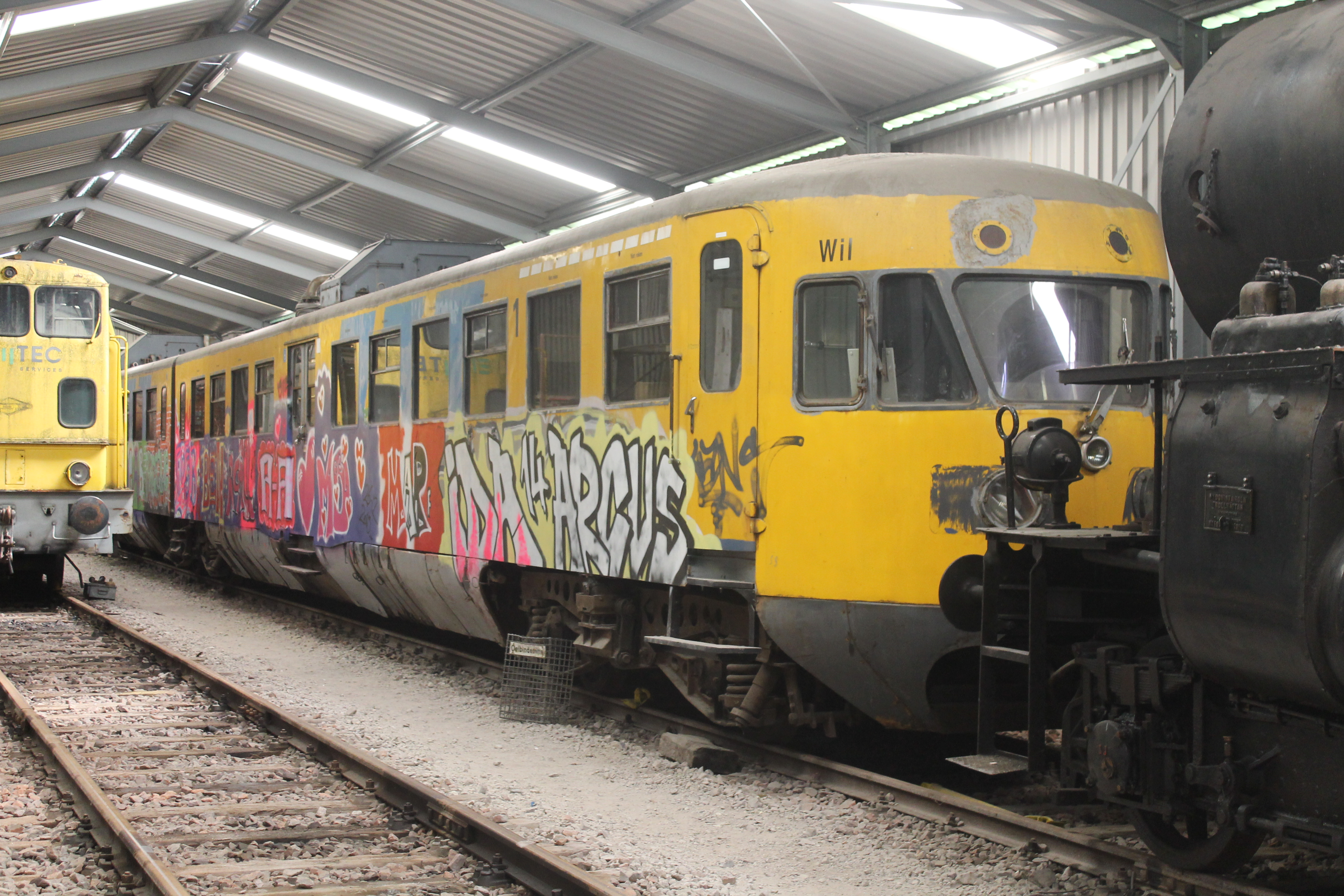
A NS DE-2 stored away at a depot in Simpelveld, the Netherlands

== Description ==
These streamlined DEMUs were built by Allan of Rotterdam in 1953-54 for Nederlandse Spoorwegen. 30 1-car DE-1 units (numbered 21-50) and 46 2-car DE-2 units (numbered 61-106) were built.

The DE-1 contained only two compartments, smoking and non-smoking. There was no separate 1st class compartment; instead, eight seats in the non-smoking compartment were designated 1st class and fitted with different seat covers.

Mechanically related to the class is the single-car DE-20, nicknamed The Camel (in Dutch: De Kameel), an inspection vehicle built in 1954, later rented out as an excursion train.

The body shape of the units is derived from the NS Mat 46. The DE-1 is 27.05m long and has two bogies, each powered by two electric motors. The DE-2 is 45.4m long and the two cars are articulated, with three bogies in total. The first and third are each powered by two electric motors, with the middle bogie being an articulated Jacobs bogie. Power is provided by two diesel engines (originally manufactured by AEC), with each engine driving one bogie. The diesel engines on the DE-2 were replaced with more powerful AEC engines in the 1960s. The wheelbase of each bogie is 3.0m, and the center-to-center distance of the bogies is 18.35m. The sets are equipped with Scharfenberg couplers, and up to three units can be coupled together for multiple working.

The units were delivered in a light blue color with orange lining and provided with wings under the cab windows, leading to the Blue Angel nickname. In the 1960s, the units were repainted into red livery that was then standard for all diesel trainsets owned by Nederlandse Spoorwegen.

== Modernisation ==
The first DE-2 unit, number 88, was refurbished by Hoofdwerkplaats Haarlem in 1975, and a further 25 DE-2 units were refurbished between 1977 and 1981. The changes included more spacious cabs, new interiors with red seating, a small first-class compartment, automatic doors, the removal of steps between the doors and the passenger seating, sliding windows to replace the crank-operated opening windows, and new Cummins diesel engines with a cooling system on the roof above each set of doors. The refurbished units were delivered in the standard Nederlandse Spoorwegen yellow livery. The refurbished units were renumbered 161-186. Due to significant differences in the conversion, prototype refurbished unit 161 was removed from service in 1984 and scrapped in 1988.

== Operations ==
The DE-1 and DE-2 units could be seen on almost all non-electrified railway lines in the Netherlands. In many cases, the trainsets were used to replace steam locomotives. The first trainsets entered service in 1953 on the Arnhem -- Winterswijk, Gouda -- Alphen aan den Rijn, and Leeuwarden -- Sneek routes. The Groningen -- Delfzijl and Groningen -- Roodeschool routes followed in the same year, and in 1954 the units were placed on the Kamperlijntje, Zwolle -- Almelo line, and other non-electrified routes in Groningen, Friesland, and South Limburg. The units could also be found on international services between Maastricht and Liège, and between Heerlen and Aachen. Electrification between Gouda and Alphen aan den Rijn in 1956 resulted in the removal of these units from that route.

In the early 1960s, the newly introduced DE-3 units replaced the DE-1 and DE-2 units on the Groningen -- Leeuwarden and Arnhem—Winterswijk routes, with the displaced units mainly being used in Twente and around Zutphen. For a short time in the 1960s, the units were in service between Alkmaar and Hoorn, and from 1970 until the electrification of the line between Geldermalsen and Tiel in 1978, the units ran through services between Utrecht, Geldermalsen, Arnhem, and Nijmegen; after electrification, this route was cut back to Tiel. The units were removed from service between Maastricht and Aachen in 1977.

Between 1981 and 1983, services on the northern branches in the provinces of Groningen and Friesland were taken over by the new Wadloper units, with all unrefurbished units being taken out of service by 1985. The refurbished DE-2 units were mainly used on unelectrified routes around Zwolle and Zutphen, and between Arnhem and Tiel. Electrification of the Maastricht—Liège route in 1985 resulted in the removal of units from international service. In 1988, the units were removed from service in South Limburg, although they returned to service between Maastricht and Aachen in December 1988. The service was cut back to Heerlen—Aachen in May 1992, before finally being replaced in August 1998 by the new DM 90 stock.

The final two DE-2 units in service, 180 and 186, after withdrawal by NS, were used by Oostnet and Syntus from 1998 and 2002, running between Almelo and Marienberg.

== Withdrawal ==
The first DE-1 units were taken out of service in 1979, following the introduction of the new diesel-hydraulic Wadloper units. Most DE-1 units followed in the early 1980s, with units 21, 22, 25, 33, 34, 36, and 41 being kept in service until the mid-1980s due to rolling stock shortages, with the final units being retired in 1984 and 1985.

Some DE-2 units were scrapped following accidents during their lifetime. The 20 unrefurbished units were retired by 1986, along with the prototype refurbished unit 161 in 1984. Unit 169 was taken out of service in 1995 following an accident, and most remaining units were taken out of service in 1997. Units 171, 178, and 179 remained in service with NS until 1998 for services in South Limburg. The final NS-operated units were taken out of service on August 14, 1998. Units 180 and 186 remained in service with Oostnet and Syntus from 1998 and 2002, with unit 164 retained as a source of spares. Unit 180 was withdrawn in April 2001 following an engine fire. Unit 186 was initially withdrawn in May 2001 with mechanical defects, but returned to service in September of that year; it was finally withdrawn on June 1, 2002. All three of the Syntus units had initially been preserved.

== Preservation ==
DE-1 41 is preserved in working order at the Dutch Railway Museum in Utrecht. The cab of DE-1 21 is preserved by Stichting Stadskanaal Rail.

DE-2 186 is preserved in working condition by the Stichting Historisch Streekvervoer Achterhoek. Unit 179 is preserved in non-operational condition at the Zuid-Limburgse Stoomtrein Maatschappij. Unit 180 has been purchased by Rail Pleasure for use as a waiting area at their Twekkelo rail bicycle location. However, in the summer of 2025, after beïng damaged by vandalism, and after complaints from nearby residents, the 180 had to be removed from its location in Twekkelo, and was subsequently scrapped. The ABk carriage from set 164 is in use as a holiday rental in Hoogwoud, with the cab of the Bk carriage preserved at the same location. The cab of the ABk carriage of number 169 has also been preserved by a private individual.

== See also ==
- Trains in the Netherlands
