= Maltoside =

Class of chemical compounds

Chemical structure of n-decyl-β-D-maltopyranoside (DM)

A maltoside is a glycoside with maltose as the glycone (sugar) functional group. Among the most common are alkyl maltosides, which contain hydrophobic alkyl chains as the aglycone. Given their amphiphilic properties, these comprise a class of detergents, where variation in the alkyl chain confers a range of detergent properties including CMC and solubility. Maltosides are most often used for the solubilization and purification of membrane proteins.

== History ==
In 1980 Ferguson-Miller et al. at Michigan State developed n-dodecyl-β-D-maltopyranoside (DDM) as part of a successful effort to purify an active, stable, monodisperse form of cytochrome c oxidase. Maltosides have been used extensively to stabilize membrane proteins for biophysical and structural studies.

== Table of detergent properties ==
| Maltoside | abbr. | CMC (mM) | MW (g/mol) | Micelle (kDa) |
|---|---|---|---|---|
| n-Decyl-β-D-maltopyranoside | DM | 1.8 (H_{2}O) | 482.6 | ~33 (69 molecules) |
| n-Dodecyl-β-D-maltopyranoside | DDM | 0.17 | 510.6 | ~72 (~78-149 molecules) |
| 6-Cyclohexyl-1-hexyl-β-D-maltopyranoside | Cymal-6 | 0.56 | 508.5 | 46.3 |
