= 97th United States Colored Infantry Regiment =

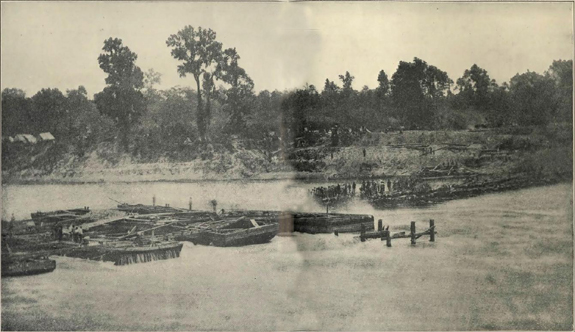
- The regiment helped construct Bailey's Dam at Alexandria, Louisiana.
- Active: August 26, 1863 – April 6, 1866
- Country: United States
- Allegiance: (United States) Union Army
- Branch: Army
- Type: Infantry
- Size: Regiment
- Part of: Department of the Gulf
- Engagements: American Civil War; Occupation of Texas coast (1863–64); Red River campaign (1864); Actions near Alexandria (1864); Battle of Yellow Bayou (1864); Battle of Pine Barren (1864); Battle of Spanish Fort (1865); Battle of Fort Blakeley (1865)

Commanders
- Notable commanders: George D. Robinson, George A. Harmount, Arnout Cannon

The 97th United States Colored Infantry was an engineer regiment designated as infantry as part of the United States Colored Troops that served in the Union Army during the American Civil War and fought in the Western Theater of the American Civil War in the Department of the Gulf. The regiment mustered in at Camp Parapet April 28, 1863, as the 1st Louisiana Engineers, but two companies, D and F had been hastily mustered into service two days earlier, April 26, 1863, and sent to Berwick City to remove obstructions from the Bayou Teche. The enlisted men of the 1st Louisiana Engineers were formerly enslaved men in the “engineer camp” who had been previously providing labor for the U.S. Army between New Orleans and Baton Rouge. Several of the newly commissioned company grade officers had been enlisted men of the 42nd Massachusetts Volunteer Infantry who had been on engineer service superintending the contraband laborers from the camp. In the summer of 1862, General Phelps had previously requested to arm the men at Camp Parapet and put them in uniform to defend the city of New Orleans but his request was denied. Gen. Banks ordered Phelps to have the men cut down all the trees between Camp Parapet and Lake Pontchartrain. Phelps resigned over the issue stating, "...while I am willing to prepare African regiments for the defense of the government," he continued, that he " was not willing to become a mere slave driver."

== Siege of Port Hudson ==
Under command of Colonel Justin Hodge, the regiment was immediately sent to Port Hudson where it fell under the direction of Captain Joseph Bailey in charge of engineer operations. Unarmed, and without being issued uniforms, they participated in the assault of May 27 carrying poles at Slaughter’s Field. They received accolades for their heroism under fire while performing engineer duties during the siege. After the siege had concluded, the regiment was then ordered on July 11 to "demolish the batteries and works of approach by the United States forces for the recent reduction of Port Hudson." The engineer order of July 13, 1863 transferred the pontoon bridge to the regiment under command of Captain John J. Smith, placed Captain Long of the regiment as assistant engineer and directing prisoners in their duties, assigned two surveyors to map out the siege lines, and placed the photographers McPherson and Oliver with the regiment.

== Red River Campaign ==
On August 26, 1863, Special Orders No.218, Department of the Gulf split the 1st Louisiana Engineers, the largest colored regiment in the Gulf with over eight-hundred in number, into two separate regiments; the 1st Regiment Engineers, Corps d’Afrique retaining Col. Hodge and 3rd Regiment Engineers, Corps d’ Afrique under command of Col. George D. Robinson. Half of the officers and men remained with the old regiment. Men of companies D, I and M of the 1st Regiment Engineers, Corps d'Afrique were transferred in their entirety while other companies had some men stay while others were transferred. In September, the 3rd Regiment Engineers, Corps d'Afrique left Algiers with the pontoon train and sailed to Texas as part of the failed Sabine River expedition. The regiment received additional officers, mainly from enlisted men of the 75th New York Volunteer Infantry. From December 1863 to February 1864, companies B and I were on detached service at Pass Cavallo, Texas unloading government vessels. All the enlisted men were African-American who were volunteers, conscripted men, and those who had received bounties. The regiment was transferred to Berwick Bay removing obstructions on the Bayou Teche before joining the Red River campaign as part of an engineer brigade.

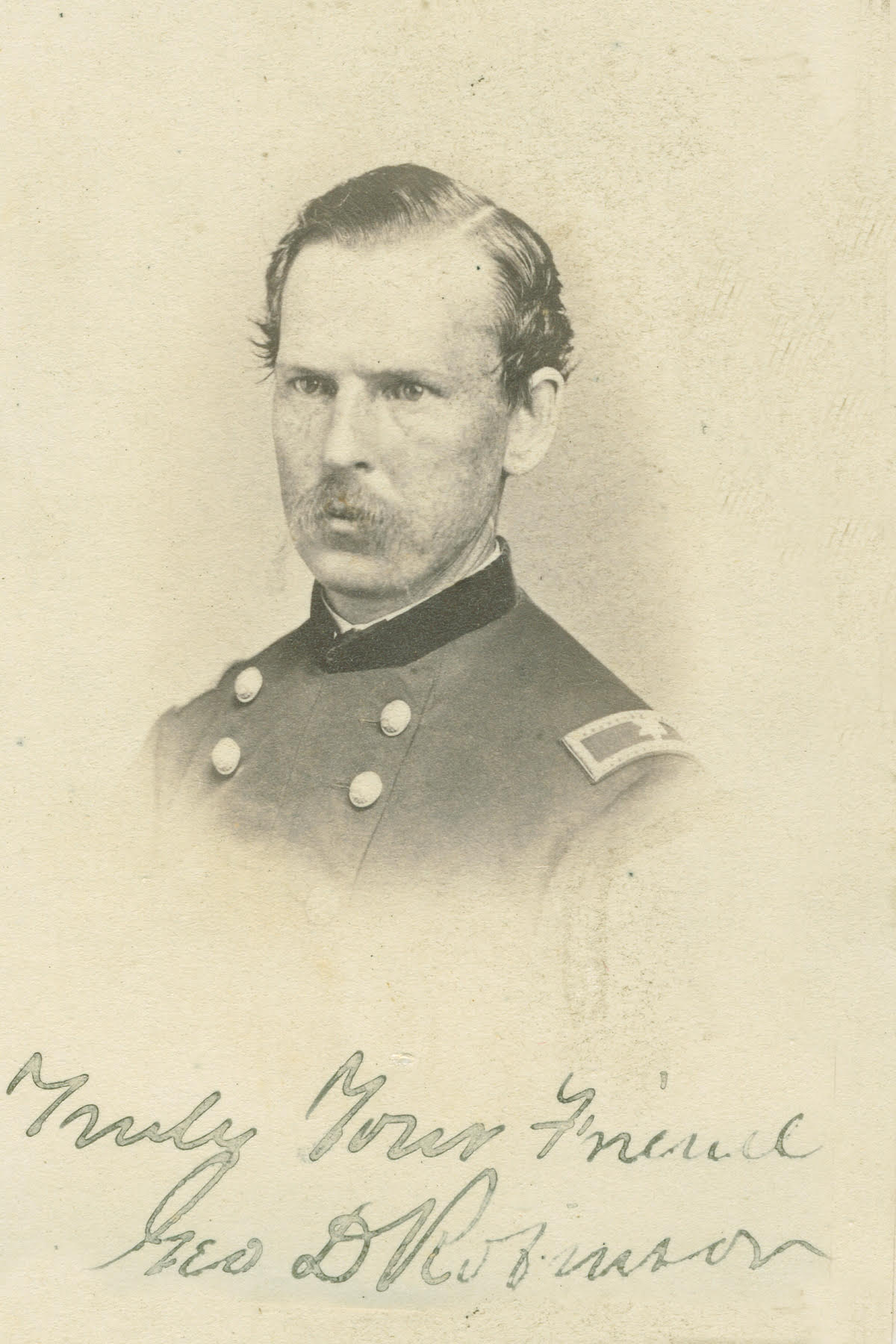
Commander of the 3rd Regiment Engineers, Corps d'Afrique (97th U.S. Colored Infantry)

During the Red River Campaign, the 3rd Regiment Engineers, Corps d’Afrique with the 5th Regiment Engineers, Corps d’Afrique fell under the command of Col. George D. Robinson who reported directly to the chief engineer of the campaign, Col. Joseph Bailey. During the campaign the regiment laid pontoon bridges over the Vermillion, Cane, and the Red River near Grand Ecore, improved roads, and built earthworks and batteries. In mid-campaign, in April 1864 it was officially renamed the 97th U.S. Colored Infantry Regiment. The regiment helped build Bailey's Dam during the actions near Alexandria rescuing Admiral Porter’s Mississippi River Squadron which had been trapped in shallow water. At the end of the campaign they laid the pontoon bridge at Yellow and at Chactaw Bayou, where, after the army crossed, it was taken it up in just fifteen minutes. At the end of the campaign it skirmished at Yellow Bayou. Reaching Morganza, the regiment converted levees into breastworks and cut embrasures for artillery. Returning to Carrollton, the regiment spent the summer practicing “practical operations of a siege,” being instructed in Duane’s Manual for Engineer Troops, performed pontoon drill on Lake Pontchartrain, and was rearmed with 1861 Springfield rifled muskets.

== Pollard Expedition ==
The regiment was transferred to Mobile Bay in August 1864. There, it repaired fortifications at Fort Gaines, Alabama and Fort Barrancas, Florida. In December, the regiment took part in an expedition to cut enemy supply lines and destroy enemy stores at the railroad junction of the Mobile & Great Northern Railroad and the Alabama & Florida Railroad at Pollard, Alabama. Col. George D. Robinson, 97th USCT) was placed in command of a brigade consisting of the 97th USCT, 82nd USCT, 86th USCT, 2nd Maine Cavalry, 1st Florida Cavalry, and Company M of the 14th New York Cavalry. Accompanying the brigade were 50 wagons and their over 300 mules to pull them, presumably the canvas advanced guard pontoon train assigned to the 97th U.S. Colored Infantry as acting engineers. The nearly sixty mile march north from Barrancas saw several encounters with Confederate cavalry at observation posts. At every river crossing bridges were secured and repaired. Approaching Pollard, the cavalry, under command of Lt. Col. Spurling, 2nd Maine Cavalry, spread out on various thrusts capturing various Confederate positions and destroyed railroad bridges between Canoe and Pollard Alabama. At Pollard, rebel quartermaster stores were destroyed, including corn, buildings were burned, the railroad station and supply houses burned to the ground. At Pollard, orders were received to return to Barrancas at once, as Confederate cavalry was massing against the expedition. On the return march, the brigade saw repeated skirmishing and was attacked by Confederate cavalry at Escambia Creek and other river crossings. The resulting Battle(s) of Escambia Creek, also known as the Battle of Pine Barren, December 17–19, 1864, was marked first by a charge over what remained of the bridge over the Little Escambia near Pollard by Col. Robinson who fell severely wounded. Col. Spurling of the Second Maine Cavalry assumed command of the expedition as they fought their way back to Barrancas. "Gave them one round from the two howitzers and then our Regiment [97th USCT] charged across the bridge." The men moved forward “with alacrity, gallantry and such dogged determination that the enemy were forced to give way leaving the dead in the field.” 1st Lt. Eugene F. Boughton was killed and 1st Lt. Burnham fell wounded. Captain Chamberlin commanding Company E reported, "Found a whole Brigade of the enemy in front, but they did not make a stand. Marched through the woods in line-of-battle all the A.M. skirmishing all the time. Stopped half an hour at noon to repair bridge (Mitchell's Creek). The enemy appeared at dusk in our rear in full force. Had a sharp fight with them. One of my men killed. Enemy repulsed. Continued the march. The enemy still harassing our rear. Reached Pine Barren creek at 11 o'clock P.M. Bridge gone. Had to ford the stream. Four of our wagons were stuck in the mud." Those wagons would be abandoned and burned. "Rebs came as expected. Our Regiment and 82nd all laid down on the crest of a hill..." In the dark, a charge by Confederate cavalrymen was met by a massed volleys from U.S. Colored Troops. "...on came the Rebs with the most devilish yells. Within ten rods we gave them a most terrific volley and followed them." “Fighting desperately and disputing every inch of ground” for an hour and a half. This final engagement ended the Confederate pursuit, and the expedition returned safely to Barrancas. The 97th U.S. Colored Infantry casualty list was 1 officer and 6 men killed, 2 officers and 24 men wounded.

== Mobile Campaign ==
During the Campaign against Spanish Fort and Fort Blakely, Alabama, the Engineer Brigade, under the command of Brig. Gen. Joseph Bailey, was assigned to the Headquarters Troops and consisted of the 96th U.S. Colored Infantry (Col. John C. Cobb), the 97th U.S. Colored Infantry (Lt. Col. George A. Harmount, Col. George D. Robinson recovering from wounds received at Pine Barren) and the 1st Pontoniers (Capt. John J. Smith, formerly of the 97th USCT). Orders issued March 7 had several officers of the 97th USCT leaving their companies to be embedded in the advancing Divisions of the XVI and XIII Corps: 1st Lieut. Hopeman, 2nd Division, XVI Corps as Chief Engineer; Captain Arnout Cannon, 3rd Division, XIII Corps, as Assistant Engineer; Captain Van Lien and Captain Morton assigned to the XIII Corps as Assistant Engineers; and Captains John Chamberin and James G. Hill, embedded with the XVI Corps Headquarters.

At Navy Cove, men of the 97th USCT boarded the steamer J. M. Brown and traveled 40 miles up the bay to Starke's Landing. The heavy rainfall coupled with the massive Union troop movement on the road to Spanish Fort utterly destroyed the route which put the Federal supply line in jeopardy. With rations running low, and nearing the Confederate works, Canby ordered the 97th U.S. Colored Infantry, superintended by Brig. Gen Joseph Bailey, to construct a wharf 3.5 miles south of Spanish Fort. Despite the lack of company officers, temporarily assigned to divisions as engineer officers, pontoon landings were quickly deployed and within 24 hours the enlisted men completed the wharfs. Starke’s Landing, as it would be known, became a depot consisting of six wharfs 300 to 500 feet long. The landing dramatically expedited the transportation of rations, reinforcements, artillery, and supplies for the siege from Fort Gaines and Fort Morgan. The landing was also a critical hub for the transportation of serious casualties from the field hospitals to be shipped by water quickly to larger medical facilities such as New Orleans. “The proportion of amputations to the number of wounded at Spanish Fort was large, as the majority of wounds during the first days of the siege were from explosion of shell.” Reported Surgeon Charles B. White, XIII Army Corps. “The wounded were moved from the division hospital to transports for transfer to New Orleans within two to four days after the injuries were received. They were accompanied by medical officers, cooks, and nurses, and furnished with medical and hospital supplies and rations, under orders from Surgeon Abadie, Medical Director."

On April 14, the men of the 97th US Colored Infantry left Starke's Landing and marched six miles to Spanish Fort. Several companies continued to Fort Blakeley on the transport steamer Iberville. The men constructed fortifications at Blakeley before marching back to Spanish Fort by the end of the month. Two companies of the 97th USCT remained at Blakeley and Captain Chamberlain oversaw the construction of "a small fort [redoubt] to garrison 300 men with 6 guns.

== Occupation of Mobile, Alabama ==
Through the end of April, 1865, the 97th U.S. Colored Infantry worked on turning the enemy works to fortify the entrance of the Alabama River. The regiment camped at Blakeley while working on the fortifications at both Blakeley and Spanish Fort. On May 2nd, the regiment arrived in Mobile via steamer from Spanish Fort. Company G remained on the eastern shore until Battery Tracy was dismantled. Throughout the months of May and June, 1865, the men of the regiment were engaged in building and repairing the fortifications at Mobile, Alabama. Company G arrived aboard the steamer Crawford on May 29th. The regiment's new camp was located just outside the city.

On the Fourth of July, 1865 there was a large and "joyfully celebrated Independence Day" in Mobile. It was the first time that the holiday had applied to the formerly enslaved population. Captain Chamberlin wrote “The different trades were represented carrying flags and the different implements of their industry. The Masonic and religious societies were also part of the procession, which was comprised on the whole of something like 5000 people. Nearly all were very neatly dressed and looked well.” The 96th and 97th USCT both acted as escorts, front and rear, as the parade marched to the public square. There, a man of color read the Declaration of Independence. Several additional dignitaries made speeches, including early civil rights leader Captain James H. Ingraham, formerly of the 73rd USCT (Louisiana Native Guard). “They seemed as Joyous for this great day of Jubilee as the same number of white children in the North, and in a much more expressive manner.”

By September the regiment had completed its fortification work in Mobile and it was assigned to guard duty at the Quartermaster’s Pay, Commissary and Ordinance Departments. At least two of the regiment’s commanding officers served as subassistant commissioners with the Freedmen’s Bureau in Mobile. Col. Arnot Cannon being the final commander of the regiment. By the time the 97th U.S. Colored Infantry mustered out of service on April 1, 1866, at Mobile, Alabama, it had become the “oldest colored Regiment in the service.”

== History ==
=== 1st Louisiana Engineers (1st Regiment Engineers, Corps d'Afrique) ===
Organized at Camp Parapet, La., April 28, 1863. Attached to 1st Division, 19th Army Corps, Dept. of the Gulf, to August, 1863. Engineer Brigade, Corps de Afrique, to October, 1863. Engineer Brigade, 13th Army Corps, Dept. of the Gulf, to April, 1864. Siege of Port Hudson, La., May 24-July 8, 1863. Assaults on Port Hudson May 27 and June 14. Surrender of Port Hudson July 9. G.O. No. 47 Headquarters Department of the Gulf, part VI, dated June 6, 1863 designated the First Louisiana Engineers as the 1st Regiment Engineers of the Corps d'Afrique. The regiment was split in two by S.O. 218, Department of the Gulf resulting in the 1st and 3rd Regiments of Engineers. Major G. D. Robinson assumed command as colonel of the 3rd Regiment Engineers, Corps d'Afrique.

=== 3rd Regiment Engineers, Corps d'Afrique ===
Organized at New Orleans, La., August 26, 1863 from companies of the 1st Regiment Engineers, Corps d'Afrique. Attached to Engineer Brigade, Dept. of the Gulf, to October 1863. Unattached, 13th Army Corps, Texas, Dept. of the Gulf, to March 1864. Provisional Brigade, 13th Army Corps, Texas, Dept. of the Gulf, to April 1864. Duty at New Orleans and Brashear City, La., until October 1863. Ordered to Texas October 1863, and duty there until March 1864. Ordered to Berwick Bay, La., thence to Franklin, La. Red River Campaign March to May. In charge of Pontoon Train. Built bridge at Vermillionville Bayou March 18, and at Cane River March 30. Designation of Regiment changed to 97th United States Colored Troops April 4, 1864.

=== 97th U.S. Colored Infantry ===
Organized April 4, 1864, from 3rd Corps de Afrique Engineers. Attached to Provisional Brigade, 13th Corps, Texas, Dept. of the Gulf, to February 1864. Engineer Brigade, Dept. of the Gulf, to October 1864. United States Forces, Mobile Bay, Dept. of the Gulf, to November, 1st Brigade, District of West Florida, to February 1865. 3rd Brigade, District of West Florida, to March 1865. Engineer Brigade, Military Division West Mississippi, to June 1865. Unattached, Dept. of the Gulf, to April 1866.

Red River Campaign to May 22, 1864. Built bridge over Red River at Grand Ecore April 12. Constructed rifle pits and Abatis about Grand Ecore April 13–19. Repair road from Grand Ecore to Cane River, and crossing over Cane River April 19–20. Lower Crossing of Cane River April 22. At Alexandria constructing works and dam April 25 – May 13. Retreat to Morganza May 13–22. Marksville May 16. Operations about Yellow Bayou May 17–20. Fatigue duty at Morganza until June 20. Ordered to New Orleans, La., June 20. Duty in District of Carrollton until August. Moved to Mobile Bay, Ala., August 20. Duty at Mobile Point and Dauphin Island until February 1865. In District of Florida until March 1865. Campaign against Mobile and its Defenses March 17 – April 12. Siege of Spanish Fort and Fort Blakely March 26 – April 9. Duty in the Fortifications of Mobile and at various points in the Dept. of the Gulf until April 1866. Mustered out April 6, 1866.
