= List of railway companies =

This is an incomplete list of the world's railway operating companies listed alphabetically by continent and country. This list includes companies operating both now and in the past.

In some countries, the railway operating bodies are not companies, but are government departments or authorities.

Particularly in many European countries beginning in the late-1980s, with privatizations and the separation of the track ownership and management from running the trains, there are now many track-only companies and train-only companies.

== Africa ==
=== Union of African Railways (UAR) ===
- Southern African Railway Association (SARA), which represents:
  - CFB (Benguela railway, in Angola)
  - Botswana Railways
  - Caminhos de Ferro de Moçambique (CFM) (Mozambique Railway)
  - Malawi Railways
  - TransNamib
  - Swaziland Railway
  - TAZARA (Tanzania/Zambia Railway Authority)
  - Zambia Railways
  - National Railways of Zimbabwe
  - Tanzania Railways Corporation
  - Central East African Railway in Malawi
  - Beitbridge Bulawayo Railway
  - Metrorail (South Africa)
  - Transnet Freight Rail (South-Africa)

=== Algeria ===
- Algerian Railways (SNTF)

=== Angola ===
- Benguela Railway
- Moçâmedes Railway
- Luanda Railway
- Gunza-Gabala line

=== Benin ===
- Benin Railways (Benirail & Bolloré Railways since 2014)

=== Botswana ===
- Botswana Railways (BR)

=== Burkina Faso ===
- Abidjan-Niger Railway (SITARAIL)

=== Cameroon ===
- Cameroon National Railways Authority (REGIFERCAM)

=== Côte d'Ivoire ===
- Abidjan-Niger Railway (SITARAIL)

=== Republic of the Congo ===
- Congo-Ocean Railway (CFCO)

=== Democratic Republic of the Congo (formerly Zaire) ===
Due to civil war, a significant portion of the railway system of the Democratic Republic of the Congo is not presently functioning.

- Congo Railway (CNC)
- Matadi-Kinshasa Railway

=== Djibouti ===
- Ethio-Djibouti Railways

=== Egypt ===
- Egyptian Railways

=== Eritrea ===
- Eritrean Railway

=== Ethiopia ===
- Ethio-Djibouti Railways

=== Gabon ===
- Gabon State Railways (OCTRA)

=== Ghana ===
- Ghana Railways & Ports (GRP) (Ghana's rail system is largely derelict)
- Ghana Railway Company

=== Guinea ===
- Guinea Railway

=== Kenya ===
- Kenya Railways
- Rift Valley Railways Consortium
- Africa Star Railway Operation Company Limited

=== Lesotho ===
- South African Railways (SAS/SAR)

=== Liberia ===
- Bong Mining Co
- Lamgo JV Operating Co

=== Madagascar ===
- Madarail
- Fianarantsoa-Côte Est railway

=== Malawi ===
- Malawi Railways (Central East African Railway)

=== Mali ===
- Dakar-Niger Railway

=== Mauritania ===
- S.N.I.M.

=== Mauritius ===
- (Doesn't have railway system but light rail Metro Express (Mauritius))

=== Morocco ===
- Office National des Chemins de Fer (ONCF): national railway office.

=== Mozambique ===
- Mozambique State Railways (Caminhos de Ferro de Moçambique) (CFM)
- Beira Railroad Corporation

=== Namibia ===
- TransNamib

TransNamib

=== Nigeria ===
- Nigerian Railway Corporation

=== Senegal ===
- Dakar-Niger Railway

=== South Africa ===
- Blue Train (South Africa) (Tour trains)
- Passenger Rail Agency of South Africa
- Transnet Freight Rail
- Gautrain (Modern High Speed Trains)

=== Sudan ===
- Sudan Railways
- Gezira Light Railway

=== Eswatini ===
- Eswatini Railways (Swaziland Railway)

=== Tanzania ===
- Tanzania Railways Corporation
- TAZARA Railway

=== Togo ===
- Togo Railways (RCFT)
- Although Togo has railways in place, no trains have run on them for many years.

=== Tunisia ===
- Tunisian National Railways (SNCFT)

=== Uganda ===
- Rift Valley Railways Consortium
- Uganda Railways Corporation

=== Zambia ===
- Zambia Railways
- TAZARA Railway
- Mulobezi Railway
- Maamba Colliery Railway
- Njanji Commuter Line

=== Zimbabwe ===
- National Railways of Zimbabwe
- Beitbridge Bulawayo Railway

(There are no railways in Burundi, Cape Verde, Central African Republic, Chad, Comoros, Equatorial Guinea, the Gambia, Guinea-Bissau, Mauritius, Niger, Rwanda, São Tomé and Príncipe, Seychelles, and Somalia.)

== Asia ==
=== Afghanistan ===
- Afghanistan has only 24.6 km of railway which are railheads from neighbouring countries. Iran and Turkmenistan plan to help Afghanistan build a rail network that would enable Iran and Turkey to link up with Central Asia.

=== Bangladesh ===
- Bangladesh Railway
- Dhaka Metro Rail

=== Myanmar ===
- Myanma Railways

=== China ===
- China Railway (CR, 中国铁路 Zhōngguó Tiělù)
  - China Railway High-speed (CRH, 中国高速铁路 Zhōngguó gāosù tiělù)
    - Beijing-Shanghai High-Speed Railway Co. Ltd
- Urban rail transit in China

==== Hong Kong ====
- MTR
  - MTR Light Rail
- Peak Tram
- Hong Kong Tramways

==== Macau ====
- Macau Light Rail Transit

=== India ===
Railway Operator

- Metrorail-Consultant.in (Metro Railway)
- Indian Railways (IR)
- Indian Railway Catering and Tourism Corporation (IRCTC)
- High Speed Rail Corporation of India Limited (HSRC)
- Rail Vikas Nigam Limited (RVNL)
- RITES (Rail India Technical and Economic Service)
- Konkan Railway Corporation (KRC)
- Container Corporation of India (CONCOR)

Urban Transit

- Calcutta Tramways Company (CTC)
- Kolkata Metro Rail Corporation (KMRC)
- Delhi Metro Rail Corporation (DMRC)
- National Capital Region Transport Corporation Ltd (NCRTC)
- Mumbai Metro One Pvt Ltd (MMOPL)
- Mumbai Metro Rail Corporation (MMRC)
- Mumbai Railway Vikas Corporation (MRVC)
- Noida Metro Rail Corporation Ltd. (NMRCL)
- Chennai Metro Rail Limited (CMRL)
- Rapid Metro Gurgaon Ltd. (RMGL)
- Bangalore Metro Rail Corporation Limited (BMRCL)
- Hyderabad Metro Rail Ltd. (HMRL)
- Jaipur Metro Rail Corporation (JMRC)
- Kerala Monorail Corporation Limited (KMCL)
- Kochi Metro Rail Ltd (KMRL)
- Lucknow Metro Rail Corporation Ltd (LMRCL)

=== Indonesia ===
- Kereta Api Indonesia (Indonesian Railways / PT KAI)
  - KAI Commuter
  - Palembang LRT
  - Jabodebek LRT (Greater Jakarta LRT)
- Jakarta MRT (MRTJ)
- Jakarta LRT (LRTJ)
- Kereta Cepat Indonesia China (Indonesia-China HSR / KCIC)

=== Iran ===
- Islamic Republic of Iran Railways
- Asia Seir Aras Company
- Rail Pardaz Seir Company
- Railway Services and Technical Construction Engineering Company (RSTC Co.)
- Raja Rail Transportation Company
- Behtash Sepahan Rail Transportation Company (BTSCo)
- Railway Transportation Company
- Railways Installations & Constructions Engineering Company (Ballast)
- Rail Tarabar Saba (Transportation)

=== Iraq ===
- Iraqi Republic Railways (IRR)

=== Israel ===
- Israel Railways
- Carmelit - the world's smallest subway system, in Haifa
- Cfir, constructing and operating the Jerusalem Light Rail
- NTA, constructing and operating the Tel Aviv Light Rail

=== Japan ===
- Japan Railways Group (JR Group)

=== Jordan ===
- Hedjaz Jordan Railway
- Aqaba Railway Corporation

=== Kazakhstan ===
- Qazaqstan Temir Zholy (Kazakhstan railways)

=== North Korea ===
- Korean State Railway

=== South Korea ===
- passenger/freight train
  - Korail
- passenger train
  - AREX
- subway
  - Busan Transportation Corporation
  - Daegu Transportation Corporation
  - Daejeon Express Transit Corporation
  - Gwangju Metropolitan Rapid Transit Corporation
  - Incheon Transit Corporation
  - Korail
  - Seoul Metro
  - Seoul Metro Line9
  - Seoul Metropolitan Rapid Transit Corporation
  - NeoTrans Co. Ltd. (Shinbundang Line)
  - Yongin Light Rail Corporation
- track management
  - Korea Rail Network Authority
- signaling system
  - Yookyung Control

=== Lebanon ===
- Lebanon State Railways

=== Malaysia ===
==== Freight, intercity and commuter rail ====
- Keretapi Tanah Melayu Berhad (KTMB)
- Malaysia Rail Link Sdn. Bhd.
- MyHSR Corporation Sdn Bhd.
- Sabah State Railway (SSR)

==== Metro and rapid transit ====
- Prasarana Malaysia - Rapid Rail Sdn Bhd
- Mass Rapid Transit Corporation Sdn. Bhd.

==== Airport train ====
- Express Rail Link Sdn. Bhd.

=== Mongolia ===
- UBTZ (Ulaanbaatar Railways)

=== Nepal ===
- Nepal Railways
- Nepal Government Railway

=== Pakistan ===
- Pakistan Railways (PR)
- Karachi Circular Railway (KCR)
- Lahore Metro

There are few private companies offering private carrying.

=== Philippines ===
- Philippine National Railways
- Light Rail Transit Authority (Line 1 and Line 2)
- Metro Rail Transit Corporation (Line 3)

=== Saudi Arabia ===
- Saudi Railways Organization
- Saudi Arabia Railways

=== Singapore ===
- Main operators
  - SBS Transit (ComfortDelGro)
  - SMRT Trains (SMRT Corporation)
- Other operators
  - Civil Aviation Authority of Singapore (Changi Airport Skytrain)
  - Sentosa Development Corporation (Sentosa Express)

=== Sri Lanka ===
- Sri Lanka Railways

=== Syria ===
- General Establishment of Syrian Railways
- General Establishment of Al Hijaz Railway which runs Hejaz Railway

=== Taiwan ===
- Taiwan High Speed Rail Corporation
- Taiwan Railway

=== Thailand ===
- State Railway of Thailand
  - S.R.T. Electrified Train Company Limited (SRT Red Lines train operator)
- BTS Group Holdings
  - Bangkok Mass Transit System (BTSC)
    - BTS Skytrain (BTS, Bangkok Mass Transit: sky train operator)
  - Northern Bangkok Monorail Company (joint venture, MRT Pink Line train operator)
  - Eastern Bangkok Monorail Company (joint venture, MRT Yellow Line train operator)
- BEM (formerly, BMCL, Bangkok Metro Company Limited: MRT Blue Line and Purple Line train operator)
- AERA1 (Airport Express operator)
- Eastern High-Speed Rail Linking Three Airports Company Limited (Eastern Line HSR operator)

=== United Arab Emirates ===
- Etihad Rails

=== Turkmenistan ===
- Demirýollary

=== Vietnam ===
- Vietnam Railways

== Europe ==
=== Albania ===
- HSH (Albanian Railways - Hekurudha Shqiptare)

=== Armenia ===
- South Caucasus Railway
- Yerevan Metro

=== Austria ===
- ÖBB (Austrian Federal Railways - Österreichische Bundesbahnen, till 1938 called BBÖ)
- STB (Stubai Valley Railway - Stubaitalbahn) de:Stubaitalbahn
- StLB (Styrian Provincial Railways - Steiermärkische Landesbahnen) de:Steiermärkische Landesbahnen
- MBS (Montafonerbahn Schruns, from Bludenz to Schruns) de:Montafonerbahn
- GKB (Graz-Köflacher Eisenbahn) de:Graz-Köflacher Eisenbahn
- LTE (Logistik- und Transport GmbH) de:Logistik- und Transport GmbH
- Westbahn

=== Azerbaijan ===
- Passenger/freight train
  - ADY (Azerbaijan Railways - Azərbaycan Dəmir Yolları)
- Subway
  - Baku Metro (Bakı Metropoliteni)

=== Belarus ===
- Belarusian Railway - Belarusian: БЧ, Беларуская Чыгунка, Белорусская железная дорога Belarusian Railway website

=== Belgium ===
- NMBS/SNCB (Belgian National Railways - Nationale Maatschappij der Belgische Spoorwegen / Société Nationale des Chemins de fer belges), abbreviated in Dutch/French.
- Lineas
- Thalys
- Eurostar
- Dillen & Le Jeune Cargo NV

=== Bosnia-Herzegovina ===
- ŽFBH (Railways of the Federation of Bosnia and Herzegovina - Željeznice Federacije Bosne i Hercegovine)
- ŽRS (Railways of Republika Srpska - Željeznice Republike Srpske)

=== Bulgaria ===
- BDZh (Bulgarian State Railways - Български Държавни Железници, Bălgarski Dărzhavni Zheleznitsi)

=== Croatia ===
- HŽ Putnički prijevoz d.o.o. (passenger transport)
- HŽ Cargo d.o.o. (freight transport)
- HŽ Infrastruktura d.o.o. (infrastructure manager)

==== Former ====
- HŽ (Croatian Railways - Hrvatske željeznice)

=== Czech Republic ===
- Správa železnic, infrastructure
- ČD (České dráhy, a.s. - Czech Railways), passenger carrier
- ČDC (ČD Cargo, a.s.), freight
- JHMD (Jindřichohradecké místní dráhy - Jindřichův Hradec Local Railways)
- PCI (PKP Cargo International, a.s.)
- UNIDO (Orlen Unipetrol Doprava, a.s.)
- MTR (METRANS Rail, s.r.o.)
- RJ (RegioJet, a.s.)
- LEO (LEO Express, a.s.)
- GWTR (GW Train Regio, a.s.)
- SDKD (SD - Kolejová doprava, a.s.)
- CZL (CZ Logistics, s.r.o.)

=== Denmark ===
==== Current ====
===== State ownership =====
- DSB (Danish State Railways - Danske Statsbaner)
- Banedanmark (Rail Net Denmark)

===== Public ownership =====
- Lokaltog (Local trains)
- Nordjyske Jernbaner (North Jutland Railways)
- Midtjyske Jernbaner (Central Jutland Railways)
- Vestbanen (Western railway)
- Aarhus Letbane (Aarhus Light Rail)
- Odense Letbane (Odense Light Rail)
- Hovedstadens Letbane (Greater Copenhagen Light Rail)
- Metroselskabet (Metro company - Copenhagen Metro)

===== Private ownership =====
- Arriva Danmark
- Keolis Danmark
- Metro Service A/S
- DB Cargo Scandinavia A/S
- Contec Rail ApS

==== Former ====
- GDS/HFHJ (Gribskovbanen / Hillerød-Frederiksværk-Hundested Jernbane)
- HHJ (Odderbanen (Hads-Ning Herreders Jernbane))
- HL (Capital City Local Railways - Hovedstadens Lokalbaner)
- HTJ/OHJ (Høng-Tølløse Jernbane / Odsherreds Jernbane)
- LJ (Lollandsbanen)
- LN (Lille Nord)
- LNJ (Lyngby-Nærum Jernbane)
- ØSJS (Eastern Railway - Østbanen (Østsjællandske Jernbaneselskab))
- VLTJ (Lemvigbanen (Vemb-Lemvig-Thyborøn Jernbane)). A popular song about the railway by Danish band Tørfisk is simply called VLTJ.

=== Estonia ===
- CoalTerminalTrans Coal train operator to Muuga coal terminal (operated in 2006)
- Edelaraudtee (passenger and freight; 1997–2014)
- Eesti Raudtee (Estonian Railways, national railway company; privatized 2001, re-nationalized 2006–2007)
- Elektriraudtee (Electric Railway, Tallinn suburban passenger railway; 1998–2013)
- Elron (government-owned passenger train operator; 2013–)
- Go Rail (named EVR Ekspress until 2006; Tallinn–Moscow passenger service operator; 1998–2015)
- Põlevkivi Raudtee (Coal train operator to Narva Power Plants)
- Raudteeinspektsioon (formerly Raudteeamet; Estonian Railway Inspectorate (regulator); 1999–)
- Spacecom (freight train operator; 2004–)
- Westgate Transport (Transoil, freight train operator)

=== Finland ===
Passenger services

- Karelian Trains
- Pääkaupunkiseudun Junakalusto Oy
- Suomen Lähijunat Oy
- VR (VR Ltd—VR Oy)

Freight only

- Fenniarail
- Teollisuuden Raideliikenne Oy
- North Rail Oy

=== France ===
- Chemins de fer de Provence (CFP) (operating 1,000 mm (3 ft 3 3/8 in) metre gauge trains Nice–Digne)
- Euro Cargo Rail
- Getlink
- SNCF (French National Railways - Société Nationale des Chemins de fer Français)
  - Chemins de fer de l'Est
  - Chemins de fer de l'État
  - Chemins de fer de l'Ouest
  - Chemins de fer du Nord
  - Chemins de fer de Paris à Lyon et à la Méditerranée
  - Chemins de fer de Paris à Orléans et du Midi
- RATP (Paris Transport Authority - Régie Autonome des Transports Parisiens)
- SNCB : services between Lille, its suburbs and Belgium
- Eurostar : services between Alps, Marseille, Paris, Lille and London
- Thalys : services between Alps, Marseille, Paris, Aachen, Brussel, Cologne, Amsterdam
- Lyria : services between Montpellier, Marseille, Paris and Switzerland
- Renfe : services between Paris, Lyon, Toulouse, Marseille, Barcelona and Madrid
- Thello : services between Paris, Marseille, Nice, Milan, Torino and Venice
- RDT13
- Ouigo : services between Marseille, Montpellier, Lyon Airport and Disneyland Resort Paris
- RTM : Marseille Public Transport Authority - Régie des Transports de Marseille
- DB
- CFL : services between Luxembourg and Volmerange-les-Mines.

=== Georgia ===
- Georgian Railway

=== Germany ===
*Deutsche Bahn (DB AG - German Railways 1992-) de:Liste deutscher Eisenbahngesellschaften

==== Passenger railways ====
- ABELLIO - Abellio GmbH de:Abellio Rail
- ABG - Anhaltische Bahn Gesellschaft mbH de:Dessau-Wörlitzer Eisenbahn-Gesellschaft (?)
- AKN - AKN Eisenbahn AG de:AKN Eisenbahn
- ALEX - Allgäu-Express de:Allgäu-Express
- AVG - Albtal-Verkehrs-Gesellschaft mbH de:Albtal-Verkehrs-Gesellschaft
- BBG - Bahnbetriebsgesellschaft Stauden mbH
- BKD - Borkumer Kleinbahn und Dampfschiffahrt GmbH de:Borkumer Kleinbahn
- BLB - Berchtesgadener Land Bahn
- BLB - Burgenlandbahn
- BayOB - Bayerische Oberlandbahn GmbH Bayerische Oberlandbahn
- BOB - Bodensee-Oberschwaben-Bahn GmbH de:Bodensee-Oberschwaben-Bahn
- BSB - Breisgau-S-Bahn-Gesellschaft de:Breisgau-S-Bahn
- BSEG - Brohltal Schmalspur-Eisenbahn Betriebs-GmbH
- BVO - Busverkehr Ober- und Westerzgebirge Bahn GmbH
- BZB - Bayerische Zugspitzbahn AG de:Bayerische Zugspitzbahn
- CAN - Cantus Verkehrsgesellschaft
- CBC - City Bahn Chemnitz GmbH de:Chemnitzer Verkehrs-Aktiengesellschaft & de:Verkehrsverbund Mittelsachsen
- Chiemsee-Bahn de:Chiemsee-Bahn
- CS - Connex Sachsen GmbH de:Connex Sachsen
- DBG - Döllnitzbahn GmbH
- Drachenfelsbahn - Bergbahnen im Siebengebirge AG
- EB - Erfurter Bahn
- EGB - DBAG Erzgebirgsbahn de:Erzgebirgsbahn
- EIB - Erfurter Industriebahn GmbH (historic)
- Eurobahn - Rhenus Keolis GmbH & Co. KG de:Eurobahn
- EVB - Eisenbahnen und Verkehrsbetriebe Elbe-Weser GmbH de:Eisenbahnen und Verkehrsbetriebe Elbe-Weser
- FEG - Freiberger Eisenbahngesellschaft mbH de:Freiberger Eisenbahn
- FKE - Königstein Railway AG de:Frankfurt-Königsteiner Eisenbahn
- FME - Franconian Museum Railway e.V. de:Fränkische Museums-Eisenbahn
- GVG - Georgs-Verkehrs-GmbH
- HEX - HarzElbeExpress (Connex Sachsen-Anhalt GmbH) de:Connex-Fernverkehr
- HLB - Hessische Landesbahn GmbH de:Hessische Landesbahn
- HSB - Harzer Schmalspurbahnen
- HSB - Heidelberger Straßen- und Bergbahn AG
- HTB - Hellertalbahn GmbH de:Hellertalbahn
- HzL - Hohenzollerische Landesbahn AG de:Hohenzollerische Landesbahn
- IL - Inselbahn Langeoog Inselbahn Langeoog
- KHB - DBAG Kurhessenbahn de:Kurhessenbahn
- KML - Kreisbahn Mansfelder Land GmbH
- Mecklenburgische Bäderbahn
- MBB - Mecklenburgische Bäderbahn Molli GmbH
- ME - Metronom Eisenbahngesellschaft mbB de:Metronom Eisenbahngesellschaft
- MeBa - Mecklenburg Bahn GmbH
- NB - Nordseebahn de:NordseeBahn
- NBE - Nordbahn Eisenbahngesellschaft mbH de:Nordbahn (Schleswig-Holstein)
- NEB - Niederbarnimer Eisenbahn
- NEG - NEG Niebüll mbH (former NVAG) de:Norddeutsche Eisenbahngesellschaft mbH (?)
- NOB - Nord-Ostsee-Bahn de:Nord-Ostsee-Bahn
- NWB - NordWestBahn de:NordWestBahn
- OBS - DBAG Oberweißbacher Berg- und Schwarzatalbahn de:Oberweißbacher Berg- und Schwarzatalbahn
- ODEG - Ostdeutsche Eisenbahn
- OEG - Oberrheinische Eisenbahngesellschaft AG de:Oberrheinische Eisenbahn
- OLA - Ostseeland-Verkehr GmbH (former MeBa/OME) de:Ostseeland Verkehr
- OPB - Oberpfalzbahn de:Oberpfalzbahn
- OSB - Ortenau-S-Bahn de:Ortenau-S-Bahn
- PEG - Prignitzer Eisenbahn-Gesellschaft de:Prignitzer Eisenbahn
- RBG - Regental Bahnbetriebe GmbH ("Länderbahn") Regentalbahn
- RBK - Regionalbahn Kassel GmbH de:Regionalbahn Kassel
- Regio-Bahn GmbH
- RHB - Rhein-Haardt-Bahn GmbH de:Rhein-Haardt-Bahn
- RNV - Rhein-Neckar-Verkehr GmbH de:Rhein-Neckar-Verkehr
- RTB - Rurtalbahn GmbH & Co. KG (former DKB) de:Rurtalbahn
- RüKB - Rügensche Kleinbahn GmbH & Co.
- Saarbahn GmbH de:Saarbahn GmbH
- S S-Bahn Berlin GmbH
- SBB - Schweizerische Bundesbahn GmbH
- SBE - Sächsisch-Böhmische-Eisenbahn de:Sächsisch-Böhmische Eisenbahngesellschaft
- SHB - Schleswig-Holstein-Bahn GmbH de:Schleswig-Holstein-Bahn
- SHG - S-Bahn Hamburg GmbH
- SOB - DBAG SüdostBayernBahn de:SüdostBayernBahn
- SOEG - Sächsisch-Oberlausitzer Eisenbahngesellschaft mbH de:Verkehrsverbund Oberlausitz-Niederschlesien
- SSB - Stuttgarter Straßenbahnen AG de:Stuttgarter Straßenbahnen
- STB - Süd-Thüringen Bahn de:Süd-Thüringen Bahn
- STE - Strausberger Eisenbahn GmbH de:Strausberger Eisenbahn GmbH
- SWEG - Südwestdeutsche Verkehrs AG de:Südwestdeutsche Verkehrs AG
- TDR - Trans regio Deutsche Regionalbahn GmbH de:Trans regio
- TE - Trossinger Eisenbahn de:Trossinger Eisenbahn
- TL - Trilex
- UBB - Usedomer Bäderbahn de:Usedomer Bäderbahn
- VBG - Vogtlandbahn GmbH de:Vogtlandbahn
- VBK - Verkehrsbetriebe Karlsruhe de:Verkehrsbetriebe Karlsruhe GmbH
- vectus - Vectus Verkehrsgesellschaft de:Vectus
- VIAS - VIAS GmbH (Odenwald-Bahn) de:VIAS GmbH
- ?? - Waldbahn
- WB - WestfalenBahn de:WestfalenBahn
- WEBA - Westerwaldbahn GmbH de:Westerwaldbahn des Kreises Altenkirchen GmbH
- WEG - Württembergische Eisenbahn-Gesellschaft de:Württembergische Eisenbahn-Gesellschaft
- Wendelsteinbahn GmbH de:Wendelsteinbahn
- WFB - DBAG WestFrankenBahn de:WestFrankenBahn
- ??? - Zahnradbahn, Stuttgart

==== Historic state railways ====
- Deutsche Bundesbahn (DB - German Federal Railways)
- Deutsche Reichsbahn (DR - East German Railways)
- Deutsche Reichsbahn-Gesellschaft (DRB - German State Railways 1920–45)

=== Greece ===
==== Infrastructure ====
- Greek Railways (Σιδηρόδρομοι Ελλάδος ΜΑΕ - Sidiródromi Elládos Máe), (state-owned infrastructure operator)
- OSE (Οργανισμός Σιδηροδρόμων Ελλάδας - Organismós Sidirodrómon Elládas), (state-owned infrastructure operator 1970–2025)
- ERGOSE (ΕΡΓΑ ΟΣΕ - Érga Osé) (as division of OSE), (state-owned 1996–2025)
- GAIAOSE (ΓΑΙΑ ΟΣΕ - Gaía Osé) (as division of OSE, now independent company), (state-owned infrastructure operator)
- Elliniko Metro (Ελληνικό Μετρό - Ellinikó Metró), (state-owned company owning and developing the Athens and Thessaloniki metro networks)

===== Infrastructure (and itineraries) =====
- Thessaloniki Metro Automatic (THEMA) (private company operating the Thessaloniki Metro underground system and itineraries)
- STASY (Σταθερές Συγκοινωνίες - Statherés Sygkinoníes), (state-owned infrastructure operator which runs the Athens Metro and Athens Tram and their itineraries).

==== Passenger Companies ====
- Hellenic Train (Private passenger and freight services on national railway network)
- Levante Trains (Private passenger operator on Greek metric railway network)

==== Freight Companies ====
- Rail Cargo Goldair (Private freight rail operator, joint venture with Rail Cargo Austria)
- PEARL (Piraeus, Europe, Asia, Rail Logistics), (Private freight rail services)
- GFR (Grup Feroviar Roman Hellas), (Private freight rail services)

=== Hungary ===
Passenger services

- MÁV Személyszállítási Zrt.
- GySEV/ROeEE (Győr-Sopron-Ebenfurth Railway - Győr-Sopron-Ebenfurti Vasút / Raab-Oedenburg-Ebenfurter Eisenbahn - Hungaro-Austrian regional railway company)

Freight only

- Rail Cargo Hungaria - formerly MÁV-Cargo
- AWT RAIL HU (Subsidiary of Advanced World Transport Group)
- MMV
- Eurogate Rail Hungary (Hungarian private rail undertaking)

Infrastructure managers

- MÁV (Hungarian State Railways - Magyar Államvasutak),
- GySEV/ROeEE (Győr-Sopron-Ebenfurth Railway - Győr-Sopron-Ebenfurti Vasút / Raab-Oedenburg-Ebenfurter Eisenbahn - Hungaro-Austrian regional railway company)

=== Iceland ===
- Apart from a short line used in the construction of Reykjavik harbour in the early 20th century, there have never been any railways in Iceland.

=== Ireland ===
- Iarnród Éireann - Irish Rail, part of CIÉ
- Northern Ireland Railways

=== Italy ===
- ATM operates tramway routes in and around Milan, and the Milan Metro underground network
- ANM operates tramway routes in Naples, and the Naples Metro underground network
- EAV, operates the Circumvesuviana railway, the Cumana railway and the Circumflegrea railway in the Naples metropolitan area and Alifana railway and Benevento-Cancello railway in northern Campania region
- FAL, operates regional railway services in Apulia and Basilicata
- Metropolitana di Roma, Metro or Subway in Rome
- FCU, operates in the Umbria region
- Ferrovia Circumetnea, the local narrow-gauge line around Mount Etna
- Bernina Railway, Linea del Bernina in Italian, the local railway of the Bernina mountain range
- AMT operates the Genoa Metro underground network and the narrow-gauge Ferrovia Genova-Casella
- Ferrovie del Gargano, operates in the northern Apulia region
- Ferrovie della Calabria, operates in the Calabria region
- Ferrovie della Sardegna, operates narrow gauge lines in almost all of the island and region of Sardinia
- Ferrovie dello Stato, or "FS", Italian State Railways, nationwide
- Ferrovie del Sud Est, operates in the central and southern Apulia region
- FNM, operates trains in Lombardy and Piedmont
- FUC, operates Ferrovia Udine-Cividale in the Friuli region
- GTT, operates in the Turin metropolitan area
- LFI, operates in the Tuscany region
- Met.Ro., operates Ferrovia Roma-Viterbo in the area of Rome
- NTV, a private high-speed train operator
- Ferrovia Adriatico Sangritana, operates in the Abruzzo region
- SFSM, operates as Ferrovia Circumvesuviana narrow-gauge lines in the Naples metropolitan area
- Sistemi Territoriali, operates in the Veneto region
- TFT (the passenger division of LFI)
- Trenitalia (passenger division of FS)
- Trenitalia Tper operates trains in Emilia-Romagna
- Trenord operates trains in Lombardy
- Trentino trasporti, railway Ferrovia Trento-Malè and a bus company in the province of Trento
- Cotral operates regional public transport services. Including railway service on certain routes

Former

- SEPSA
- MetroCampania NordEst

=== Kazakhstan ===
- Qazaqstan Temir Zholy (Kazakhstan railways)

=== Kosovo ===
- Kosovo Railways (Kosovo Railways J.S.C - Hekurudhat e Kosovës Sh.A - Kosovske Železnice D.O.O.)

=== Latvia ===
- LDz (Latvian Railway - Latvijas dzelzceļš - infrastructure manager)
- Baltijas Ekspresis (Private rail company - Cargo Train)
- Baltijas Tranzita Servis (Private rail company - Cargo Train)
- LDz Cargo (Cargo Train)
  - Pasažieru Vilciens (Passenger Train)

=== Lithuania ===
- LTG (Lithuanian Railways - Lietuvos geležinkeliai)
- ASG (Aukštaitijos narrow gauge railway - Aukštaitijos siaurasis geležinkelis)

=== Luxembourg ===
- CFL (Luxembourg Railways - Chemins de Fer Luxembourgeois)

=== North Macedonia ===
- MZ (Macedonian Railways - Makedonski Zeleznici)

=== Malta ===
- Malta Railway Company Limited (1883–1890)
- Government of Malta (1892–1931)

=== Moldova ===
- CFM (Moldovan Railway - Calea Ferată din Moldova)

=== Monaco ===
- SNCF (French National Railways - Société Nationale des Chemins de fer Français)

=== Montenegro ===
- Railways of Montenegro (Railways of Montenegro - Željeznica Crne Gore)

=== Netherlands ===
- Nederlandse Spoorwegen (NS; English: "Dutch Railways")
  - NS International
- Arriva Netherlands
- Connexxion
- Breng
- Keolis Nederland
- Qbuzz, operates on the MerwedeLingelijn

A few Dutch railway stations are served, even for journeys within the country, by foreign railway companies under the responsibility of NS. These companies are:

- DB Regio, including DB Regionalbahn Westfalen and DB Euregiobahn
- Prignitzer Eisenbahn, part of Arriva Germany
- Abellio Rail NRW
- National Railway Company of Belgium (NMBS/SNCB)

Cargo operators include:

- DB Cargo
- ACTS
- ERS Railways
- HSL Logistik
- RAIL4CHEM

=== Norway ===
- Vy (current) (State owned)
- Bane NOR (infrastructure) (State owned)
- CargoNet (State owned)
- Railcare Tåg (Swedish Rail Infrastructure Companies)
- Airport Express Train (State owned)
- Hector Rail (Private Swedish freight rail carrier with permission to operate in Norway on certain lines )
- Malmtrafikk (Owned by Swedish government under state owned mining company LKAB )
- NSB Gjøvikbanen (State owned)
- SJ (Swedish State Railroads)
- Go-Ahead Nordic (Private company)
- Sporveien (Metro and trams in Oslo)
- Bybanen (light railway)
- Green Cargo (Swedish state owned freight rail company)
- Norske Tog (state owned rolling stock manager)

=== Poland ===
- Lower Silesian Railways (Lower Silesian Railways; KD) - Regional rail operator in the Lower Silesian Voivodeship.
- Lesser Poland Railways (Lesser Poland Railways; KMAL) - Regional rail operator in the Lesser Poland Voivodeship.
- Masovian Railways (Koleje Mazowieckie; KMKOL) - Regional rail operator in the Masovian Voivodeship.
- Silesian Railways (Silesian Railways; KSL) - Regional rail operator in the Silesian Voivodeship.
- Greater Poland Railways (Greater Poland Railways; KW) - Regional rail operator in the Greater Poland Voivodeship.
- Łódź Agglomeration Railway (Lodz Agglomeration Railway) - Commuter Rail operator based in Lodz, owned by the Voivodeship Government.
- PKP Cargo (freight)
- PKP Intercity (long-haul passenger)
- PKP LHS (broad-gauge line operator)
- PKP PLK (infrastructure)
- Pomorska Kolej Metropolitalna - metropolitan rail owned by the Pomeranian Voivodeship
- Polregio
- Szybka Kolej Miejska (Tricity) (Szybka Kolej Miejska - S-Bahn type service in Poland's Tricity region)
- Rapid Urban Railway (Warsaw)
- Warszawska Kolej Dojazdowa
- Arriva PCC - Consortium of PCC Rail and Arriva Polska won auction of passenger rail service on diesel lines in Kuyavian-Pomeranian Voivodship for 3 years (from December 2007)
- CTL Logistics
- Lotos Kolej
- Orlen KolTrans
- PCC Intermodal
- DB Cargo Polska
- Infra Silesia (infrastructure)
- Trakcja Polska (building company)

=== Portugal ===
==== State companies ====
- CP (Portuguese Railways - Caminhos de ferro portugueses); Since 2004: Portuguese Trains - Comboios de Portugal
- IP Infrastructure management; since 2015

==== State subway companies ====
- Metro de Lisboa
- Metro do Porto

==== Private companies ====
- Fertagus
- Medway (formerly CP Carga)
- Takargo (In partnership with COMSA)

=== Romania ===
==== State companies ====
- CFR Călători, passenger services
- CFR Marfă, freight transport
- Compania Națională de Căi Ferate CFR, infrastructure

==== Private companies ====
- Grup Feroviar Român
- Unifertrans
- Regio Călători
- Cargo Trans Vagon
- CTF
- SAAF
- Constantin Group
- Rail Force
- Sudarec
- RollingStock
- Via Terra
- Express Forwarding
- DEVEGA Rail

==== Private Company rail operator ====
- Dori Trans
- CET Suceava
- CET Brașov
- Termocentrala Deva-Mintia
- AZOMURES
- CefMur
- Electro Comp Iași
- Vitrometan Medias
- Remarul 16 Februarie
- Transferoviar Grup
- Softrans
- Transcombi
- Trans Expedition Feroviar
- SET CFR
- Trans blue
- Classfer

==== Light rail ====
- Metrorex - Bucharest Metro rapid transit
- RAT - Public transport including trams and light rail

==== Former companies ====
- Căile Ferate Române - State Railway Company

=== Russia ===
- RZhD (Russian Railways - Российские железные дороги, Rossiskiye Zheleznye Dorogi)
- Freight One (Freight One - Первая Грузовая Компания, Pervaya Gruzovaya Companiya)
- New Forwarding Company (Новая перевозочная компания)
- Yamal Railway
- Yakutian Railway
- Crimea Railway

=== Serbia ===
- Serbian Railways (ŽS) - Engineering, formerly single national railway company
- Srbijavoz - Passenger transport
- Srbija Kargo - Cargo transport
- Serbian Railways Infrastructure - Infrastructure asset management

=== Slovakia ===
- ŽSR (Železnice Slovenskej Republiky - The Railways of the Slovak Republic, infrastructure manager)
- Železničná spoločnosť Slovensko, a.s. (ZSSK, passenger transport operator)
- ZSSKC (Železničná Spoločnosť Cargo Slovakia, a.s., freight transport operator)
- LTE (LTE Logistik a Transport Slovakia s.r.o.)
- SŽDS (Slovenská železničná dopravná spoločnosť, a.s.)

=== Slovenia ===
- SŽ (Slovenian Railways, passenger carrier)
- SŽ-Infrastruktura, infrastructure
- SŽ-Tovorni promet, freight
- Adria Transport, First private railway company in Slovenia de:Adria Transport

=== Spain ===
==== State companies ====
- Adif (Railway Infrastructure Manager - Administrador de Infraestructura Ferroviaria)
- Renfe (Incumbent train undertaking - Broad and Standard Gauge)
- EuskoTren (Basque Railways - Eusko Trenbideak)
- FGC (Catalan Government Railways - Ferrocarrils de la Generalitat de Catalunya)
- FGV (Valencian Government Railways - Ferrocarrils de la Generalitat Valenciana)
- SFM (Majorcan Railway Services - Serveis Ferroviaris de Mallorca)

==== Private companies ====
- Acciona Rail Services
- ArcelorMittal Siderail
- Captrain España
- Continental Rail
- FS (Sóller Railway - Ferrocarril de Sóller)
- Logitren
- Low Cost Rail
- Tracción Rail
- Transfesa
- Transitia Rail

=== Sweden ===
- Arlanda Express
- Bergslagernas Järnvägar
- BK Tåg
- Transdev
- Green Cargo
- Hector Rail
- MTR Express
- MTR Stockholm
- SJ (State Railways - Statens Järnvägar)
- Skandinaviska Jernbanor
- Tågkompaniet

=== Switzerland ===
- AB (Appenzeller Bahnen, de:Appenzeller Bahnen)
  - RHB (Rorschach-Heiden-Bahn)
  - RhW (Bergbahn Rheineck–Walzenhausen)
  - TB (Trogenerbahn, de:Trogenerbahn)
- ASm (Aare Seeland mobil) de:Aare Seeland mobil
- BC (Blonay–Chamby Museum Railway)
- BDWM (BDWM Transport AG), merger of
  - BD (Bremgarten-Dietikon-Bahn)
  - WM (Wohlen-Meisterschwanden-Bahn)
- BLM (Bergbahn Lauterbrunnen-Mürren)
- BLS (BLS AG), merger of
  - BLS (Bern - Lötschberg - Simplon bahn)
  - RM (Regionalverkehr Mittelland AG de:Regionalverkehr Mittelland)
    - EBT (Emmental-Burgdorf-Thun Bahn de:Emmental-Burgdorf-Thun-Bahn)
- BLT (Baselland Transport, de:Baselland Transport)
- BOB (Berner Oberland Bahnen), also owns
  - SPB (Schynige Platte Bahn)
- BRB (Brienz Rothorn Bahn)
- BVB (Basler Verkehrs-Betriebe)
- CIS (Cisalpino), Train operating company
- CJ (Chemins de fer du Jura de:Chemins de fer du Jura)
- Db (Dolderbahn, Zürich)
- DFB (Dampfbahn Furka-Bergstrecke)
- DVZO (Dampfbahn-Verein Zürcher Oberland), preserved line ex-SBB
- FART (Ferrovie autolinee regionali ticinesi)
- FB (Forchbahn)
- FLP (Ferrovia Lugano-Ponte Tresa)
- FW (Frauenfeld-Wil-Bahn de:Frauenfeld-Wil-Bahn)
- GGB (Gornergrat-Monte Rosa-Bahnen)
- JB (Jungfraubahn)
- KLB (Kriens-Luzern-Bahn), short freight line until December 2009, remaining infrastructure to Zentralbahn
- LEB (Chemin de fer Lausanne-Echallens-Bercher)
- LO (Métro Lausanne-Ouchy)
- MBC (Transports de la région Morges-Bière-Cossonay), was before
  - BAM (Chemin de fer Bière-Apples-Morges de:Chemin de fer Bière-Apples-Morges)
- MG (Monte Generoso Railway)
- MGB (Matterhorn-Gotthard-Bahn) (merger between FO and BVZ)
  - BVZ (BVZ Zermatt-Bahn ex Brig - Visp - Zermatt Bahn)
  - FO (Furka Oberalp Railway)
- MIB (Meiringen-Innertkirchen Bahn), owned by KWO (Kraftwerke Oberhasli)
- MOB (Chemin de fer Montreux-Oberland Bernois)
- MVR (Transports Montreux-Vevey-Riviera)
- NStCM (Chemin de fer Nyon-St-Cergue-Morez de:Chemin de fer Nyon-Saint Cergue-Morez)
- OeBB (Oensingen-Balsthal-Bahn)
- PB (Pilatusbahn)
- RB (Rigi Railways)
  - VRB (Vitznau-Rigi-Bahn (see Rigi-Bahnen))
- RBS (Regionalverkehr Bern-Solothurn, de:Regionalverkehr Bern-Solothurn)
- RhB (Rhätische Bahn / Viafier retica)
- RiT (Riffelalp Tramway)
- SBB CFF FFS (Swiss Federal Railways - Schweizerische Bundesbahnen - Chemins de fer fédéraux - Ferrovie federali svizzere)
- SEFT (Società Esercizio Ferroviario Turistico operating Ferrovia Mesolcinese)
- SOB (Schweizerische Südostbahn AG de:Schweizerische Südostbahn)
  - BT (Bodensee Toggenburg Bahn)
- ST (Sursee-Triengen railway)
- SVB (Städtische Verkehrsbetriebe Bern, "Bernmobil", de:Bernmobil)
- SZU (Sihltal Zürich Uetliberg Bahn)
- THURBO (THURBO), passenger operation, also successor of
  - MThB (Mittelthurgau-Bahn)
- TMR (Transports de Martigny et Régions)
  - MC (Martigny-Châtelard)
  - MO (Martigny-Orsières)
- TN (Transports publics du littoral neuchatelois)
- TPC (Transports Publics du Chablais (merger of AL, AOMC, ASD and VB)
  - AL (Aigle-Leysin Bahn (see TPC))
  - AOMC (Aigle-Ollon-Monthey-Champéry (see TPC))
  - ASD (Aigle-Sépey-Diablerets (see TPC))
  - BVB (Bex-Villars-Bretaye) (see TPC)
- TPF (Transports publics Fribourgeois)
  - GFM (Chemins de fer Fribourgeois (Gruyère-Fribourg-Morat))
- TPG (Transports Publics Genevois)
- TRAVYS (Transports Vallée de Joux - Yverdon-les-Bains - Ste-Croix)
  - OC (Orbe-Chavornay)
  - PBr (Chemin de fer Pont-Brassus)
  - YSC (Chemin de fer Yverdon - Ste-Croix)
- TRN (TRN SA for "Transports publics neuchâtelois")
- TSOL (société du tramway du sud-ouest lausannois S.A.)
- VBG (Verkehrsbetriebe Glattal)
- VBZ (Verkehrsbetriebe Zürich)
- WAB (Wengernalpbahn)
- WB (Waldenburgerbahn, de:Waldenburgerbahn)
- WSB (Wynental- und Suhrentalbahn)
- ZB Zentralbahn (2005 merger of the Luzern-Stans-Engelberg-Bahn and the Swiss Federal Railways' Bruenigbahn)
  - LSE (Luzern-Stans-Engelberg-Bahn)

=== Turkey ===
- TCDD (TCDD - Turkiye Cumhuriyeti Devlet Demiryolları)
- İstanbul Ulaşım A.Ş. (operating subways in city of Istanbul)
- İZBAN (operating commuter trains in city of İzmir)
- TUVASAS (Turkish wagon industry)
- TULOMSAS (Turkish Locomotiveand Engines industry)
- TUDEMSAS (Turkish carriage wagon industry)
- EUROTEM (Railway Vehicles Industry and Trade Joint Stock Company)
- SİTAŞ (Sivas Sleeper Manufacturing Industry and Trade Joint Stock Company)
- RAYSİMAŞ (Rail Systems Engineering, Consultancy Joint Stock Company)
- VADEMSAŞ (Voestalpine Kardemir Railway Systems Industry and Trade Joint Stock Company)

=== Ukraine ===
- UZ (Ukrainian Railway - Укрзалізниця, Ukrzaliznytsia)

=== United Kingdom ===
Most passenger services are due to be nationalised by 2027, with Great British Railways, a state owned operator, taking control of all franchises except open-access operators.

- Arriva Rail London
- Avanti West Coast
- CrossCountry
- c2c
- Chiltern Railways
- East Midlands Railway
- Eurostar
- Getlink
- Govia Thameslink Railway
- Grand Central
- Greater Anglia
- Great Western Railway
- Heathrow Express
- Hull Trains
- London North Eastern Railway
- London Underground
- Merseyrail
- Northern Trains
- ScotRail
- South Western Railway
- Southeastern
- Transport for Wales
- TransPennine Express
- Tyne & Wear Metro
- West Midlands Trains

=== Vatican City ===
- FS, Italian State Railways
- Trenitalia (Passenger division of FS)

== Latin America and the Caribbean ==
=== Argentina ===
- Trenes Argentinos (SOFSE) (2013)
- Administración de Infraestructuras Ferroviarias Sociedad del Estado (Part of Trenes Argentinos, infrastructure division)
- Tren Patagonico

==== Freight operators ====
- Trenes Argentinos (TACyL, Trenes Argentinos Cargas y Logística) is the state-run company operating the Belgrano, San Martín, and Urquiza freight lines.
- Ferrosur Roca - (FR) Operates most of the former Roca division of FA.
- Nuevo Central Argentino - (NCA) Operates former Mitre division of FA.
- Ramal Ferro Industrial Río Turbio - (RFIRT). See also Rio Turbio Railway.

==== Suburban operators ====
- Ferrovías - operates services over Linea Belgrano Norte.
- Metrovias - operates services over Linea Urquiza and also operates the Buenos Aires Underground
- Trenes Argentinos (formerly known as Ferrocarriles Argentinos, Nuevos ferrocarriles argentinos and SOFSE) operates most of the suburban lines in Argentina, including the Roca line, the Sarmiento line, the Mitre line, the South Belgrano line, the San Martín line and the Tren de la costa line in Buenos Aires metro area. It also operates suburban lines in Resistencia, Chaco, Paraná, Entre Ríos, and Neuquén, Neuquén. Currently, another suburban rail system is being built in Córdoba.
- Sociedad de Transporte de Mendoza is a company run by the government of the city of Mendoza that currently operates the suburban light rail and tram system of that city and the city of Godoy Cruz.

==== Long distance and regional passenger operators ====
- Trenes Argentinos (formerly known as Ferrocarriles Argentinos, Nuevos ferrocarriles argentinos and SOFSE) operates almost every long distance and regional train in Argentina.
- Tren Patagonico is a company run by the government of the province of Río Negro. It currently operates two lines.

=== Belize ===
- (There are no longer any railways in Belize)
- Stann Creek Railway (closed in 1937 - see Rail transport in Belize)

=== Bolivia ===
- Empresa Nacional de Ferrocarriles (ENFER) (Bolivia National Railways, 1996 split and partly privatized)
- Empresa Ferroviaria Andina (FCA) (Western railway network)
- Ferroviaria Oriental S.A. (FO) (Eastern railway network, 50% owned by Genesee & Wyoming)

=== Brazil ===
- Rede Ferroviária Federal SA (RFFSA)
- América Latina Logística SA (ALL)
- MRS Logística (MRS)
- Ferrovia Centro Atlântica (FCA) (Controlled by Vale)
- Companhia Ferroviária do Nordeste (CFN) (Controlled by Companhia Siderúrgica Nacional)
- Companhia do Metropolitano de São Paulo (Metrô-SP) (the state owned company responsible for rapid transit in the state of São Paulo, except for lines 4, 5 and 6)
- Companhia Paulista de Trens Metropolitanos (CPTM) (the state owned company responsible for the commuter trains in the state of São Paulo)
- ViaQuatro (CCR S.A.) (private owned company responsible for operation of rapid transit Line 4 of São Paulo)
- ViaMobilidade (CCR S.A.) (private owned company responsible for operation of rapid transit Line 5 of São Paulo)
- Linha Universidade (Acciona) (private owned company responsible for construction and operation of rapid transit Line 6 of São Paulo)
- Supervia (the privately owned company responsible for the commuter trains in the state of Rio de Janeiro)
- Companhia Brasileira de Trens Urbanos (CBTU) (the state owned company responsible for the commuter trains in several states)
- Ferronorte (controlled by Brasil Ferrovias holding, from 2006 to ? was bought by the company América Latina Logística SA (ALL))
- Novoeste (controlled by Brasil Ferrovias holding, from 2006 to ? was bought by the company América Latina Logística SA (ALL)))
- Ferroban (controlled by Brasil Ferrovias holding, from 2006 to ? was bought by the company América Latina Logística SA (ALL)))

Those lines were always privately owned:

- Estrada de Ferro Vitória a Minas (EFVM) (Controlled by Vale)
- Estrada de Ferro Carajás (EFC) (Controlled by Vale)

=== Chile ===
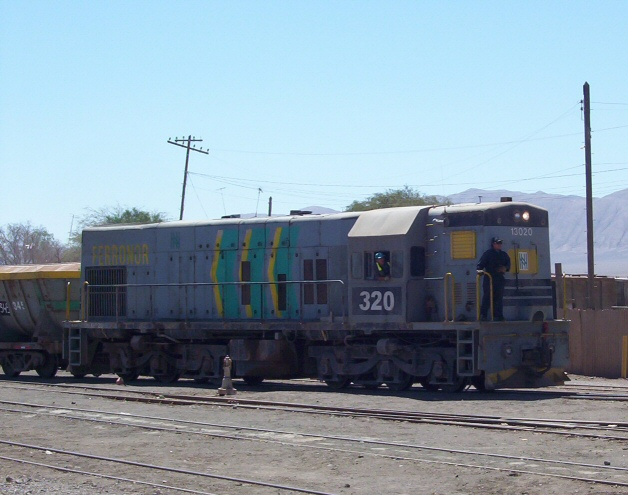
Locomotive Ferronor 320. Locomotive General Electric U9C

- Empresa de los Ferrocarriles del Estado (EFE) Chilean State Railways
- FEPASA, Chilean Freight Operation Concession on the broad gauge lines in the south
- TRANSAP, Chilean Freight Operation Concession on the broad gauge lines in the south
- Ferronor FERRONOR, Chilean Freight Operation Concession on the meter gauge lines in the north
- FCALP, Chilean Freight Operation Concession on the meter gauge lines in the north
- FCAB, Chilean Freight Operation Private company on the meter gauge lines in the north
- Sociedad Química y Minera, 3 ft 6 in (1,067 mm) gauge line from Maria Elena to Tocopilla

=== Colombia ===
- Ferrocarriles Nacionales de Colombia (National Railways of Colombia)

=== Costa Rica ===
- Instituto Costarricense de Ferrocarriles (INCOFER), llamado antes de 1991 FECOSA (Ferrocarriles de Costa Rica)
- National Atlantic Railroad Formerly called Northern Railway Company before being taken by Costa Rican government
- Pacific Electric Railroad

=== Cuba ===
- Ferrocarriles Nacionales de Cuba (Cuban National Railways)

=== Ecuador ===
- Empresa de Ferrocarriles Ecuatorianos (Ecuador State Railways)

=== Falkland Islands ===
- Camber Railway (1915 - 1920s/1940)

=== Guatemala ===
- Ferrocarriles de Guatemala (FEGUA) (Guatemala Railway) - see Rail transport in Guatemala

=== Haiti ===
- Compagnie des Chemins de Fer de Port-au-Prince, January 17, 1878 - April 1888
- Société des Tramways de Port-au-Prince, April 18, 1897–1901
  (purchased by Compagnie des Chemins de Fer de la Plaine du Cul-de-Sac)
- Chemin de Fer Central (owned by Haitian American Sugar Company/Hasco) 1915–1932(?)
- Compagnie des Chemins de Fer de la Plaine du Cul-de-Sac 1896–1950s(?)
- Compagnie Nationale (Compagnie de Fer Nationale?/Haitian National Railroad?) 1905–1940s(?)
  (probably purchased by Société Haitiano-Américaine de Développement Agricole/SHADA in 1940s)

=== Honduras ===
- Ferrocarril Nacional de Honduras
- Vaccaro Railway
- Tela Railroad

Here are some pictures and information on Ferrocarril Nacional de Honduras http://www.fahrplancenter.com/FCNacionalHondurasEntry.html

=== Jamaica ===
- Jamaica Railway Corporation

=== Nicaragua ===
- (There are no longer any railways in Nicaragua)
- Ferrocarril del Pacifico de Nicaragua (Pacific Railway of Nicaragua)

see some pictures on http://www.fahrplancenter.com/NicaraguaTitel.html

=== Panama ===
- Panama Canal Railway
- Chiriqui National Railroad
- Bay Line Railroad de Panama

=== Paraguay ===
- Ferrocarril Presidente Carlos Antonio Lopez (President Carlos Antonio Lopez Railway)

=== Peru ===
- Empresa Nacional de Ferrocarriles del Peru (ENAFER) (Peruvian National Railways)

=== El Salvador ===
- Ferrocarriles Nacionales del Salvador (FENADESAL) (National Railways of El Salvador)

=== Suriname ===
- Suriname Government Railway

=== Uruguay ===
- Administración de Ferrocarriles del Estado (AFE) (State Railways Administration).

=== Venezuela ===
- Instituto Autónomo de Ferrocarriles del Estado (IAFE) (Venezuela National Railways)
- Ferrominera Orinoco C.A.

== North America ==
=== Canada ===
- Canadian National Railway
- Canadian Pacific Railway
- GO Transit
- Via Rail
- Ontario Northland Railway
- Rocky Mountaineer
- White Pass and Yukon Route
- New Brunswick Southern Railway
- Quebec North Shore and Labrador Railway
- Quebec Gatineau Railway
- Tshiuetin Rail Transportation
- Great Western Railway (Saskatchewan)
- Hudson Bay Railway (1910)
- Hudson Bay Railway (1997)
- Huron Central Railway
- Ottawa Valley Railway
- Ontario Southland Railway
- Southern Ontario Railway
- Réseau de transport métropolitain
- West Coast Express
- Urban transit
- OC Transpo (Ottawa)
- Société de transport de Montréal (Montreal)
- Toronto Transit Commission (Toronto)
- Calgary Transit (Calgary)
- Edmonton Transit Service (Edmonton)
- Metro Vancouver (Vancouver)
- Lake line Railway (Manitoba)

=== Mexico ===
- Ferrovalle
- Ferrocarril Chiapas-Mayab
- Ferrocarril del Istmo de Tehuantepec
- Ferrocarril y Terminal del Valle de México
- Ferrosur
- Ferromex
- Ferroviaria y Abastecedora del Pacifico
- Ferrocarriles Nacionales de Mexico (FNM) (formerly FNM)
- Ferrocarril Sonora-Baja California (SBC)
- Kansas City Southern de México (KCSM), wholly owned by the Kansas City Southern Railway which both operate together as one.
- Línea Coahuila Durango

=== United States ===
- Airlake Terminal Railway
- Alabama and Florida Rail Road Company
- Alaska Railroad
- Amtrak
- AN Railway
- Arizona & California Railroad
- Baltimore and Ohio Railroad
- BHP Nevada Railroad
- BNSF Railway
- Brightline
- Burlington Northern Railroad
- Burlington Junction Railway
- California High-Speed Rail
- Caltrain
- Chesapeake and Ohio Railway
- Central Pacific Railroad
- Central Valley Union Railroad
- Chicago, Burlington and Quincy Railroad
- Chicago and North Western Transportation Company
- Chicago South Shore and South Bend Railroad
- Conrail (Consolidated Rail Corporation)
- CSX Transportation
- Dakota, Minnesota and Eastern Railroad
- Durango and Silverton Narrow Gauge Railroad
- Florida East Coast Railroad
- Florida Gulf and Atlantic Railroad
- Genesee & Wyoming
- Great Northern Railroad
- Iowa, Chicago and Eastern Railroad
- Iowa Interstate Railroad
- Kansas City Southern Railway
- Lake State Railway
- Louisville and Nashville Railroad
- MARC Train
- Metra
- Metrolink
- Metro Transit
- Metropolitan Transportation Authority
- Miami Metrorail
- Milwaukee Road (Chicago, Milwaukee, St. Paul and Pacific Railroad)
- Missouri Pacific
- Mobile and Girard Railroad
- Mobile and Montgomery Railroad Company
- Mobile and Montgomery Railway Company
- Mobile and Ohio Railroad
- Montana Rail Link
- Montgomery and West Point Railroad
- Nevada Northern Railway
- New York and Atlantic Railway
- New York Central Railroad
- New York, New Haven and Hartford Railroad
- NJ Transit
- Nickel Plate Road
- Norfolk Southern Railway
- Norfolk and Western Railway
- PATH
- Pennsylvania Railroad
- Pensacola and Louisville Railroad Company
- Pensacola Railroad
- Providence & Worcester Railroad
- Santa Fe Railway
- Southern Pacific Transportation Company
- SEPTA
- South Shore Line
- St. Croix Valley Railroad
- SunRail
- Tacoma Rail
- Tri-Rail
- Union Pacific Railroad
- Washington Department of Transportation
- Western Maryland Railway
- Western Pacific Railroad
- Wheeling and Lake Erie Railway (1916–1988)
- Wheeling and Lake Erie Railway (1990)
- Wisconsin and Southern Railroad

== Oceania ==
=== Australia ===
- Pacific National
- SCT Logistics
- Aurizon
- One Rail Australia
- Southern Shorthaul Railroad
- TasRail
- Qube Holdings
- V/Line
- NSW TrainLink
- Journey Beyond（formerly Great Southern Rail)）
- Bowmans Rail
- Transwa
- Transperth
- Queensland Rail
- Metro Trains Melbourne
- Sydney Trains
- Adelaide Metro

=== New Zealand ===
- New Zealand Railways Department NZR or NZGR (to 1981)
- New Zealand Railways Corporation (Rail operator 1981 – 1990, land owner 1990 – 2003, Ontrack 2003–2008, railway land owner 2008 – present)
- New Zealand Rail Limited (Defunct, privatised 1993, renamed Tranz Rail in 1995)
- Tranz Rail (Defunct, brought out by Toll New Zealand in 2003)
- Toll New Zealand (Defunct, brought out by Government 2008)
- KiwiRail (formed 2008)
- Transdev Auckland (2004 - 2022)
- Auckland One Rail (2022 - )
- Dunedin Railways (formerly Taieri Gorge Railway)
- New Zealand Midland Railway Company (to 1890s)
- Sanson Tramway (to 1945)
- Wellington & Manawatu Railway Company (to 1908)
