= Hurricane, Alabama =

Unincorporated community in Alabama, United States

Hurricane
- Unincorporated community
- Location within the state of Alabama
- Coordinates: 30°50′28″N 87°54′07″W
- Country: United States
- State: Alabama
- County: Baldwin
- Elevation: 30 ft (9.1 m)
- Time zone: UTC-6 (Central (CST))
  - Summer (DST): UTC-5 (CDT)
- Area code: 251

Hurricane is an unincorporated community in Baldwin County, Alabama on the Tensaw River about 12 miles (19 km) north of Spanish Fort, Alabama.

== History ==
Variant names were "Hurricane Bayou" and "Tensaw Station".

During the Civil War, it was called Tensaw Station, the final station on the Mobile and Great Northern Railroad, which was a crucial link in connecting Montgomery to Meridian. Because of a rail gap between Montgomery and Selma, war time soldiers and supplies were routed on trains from Montgomery to Tensaw Station via Pollard, then transferred to steamship headed for Mobile, to be reload on trains to Meridian.

A post office called Hurricane Bayou was established in 1877, the name was changed to Hurricane in 1895, and the post office closed in 1962. The community was named for the fact a hurricane had struck the area.
