= Mobile metering =

Mobile metering (recording of data using a mobile meter) is a technology which enables mobile recording of metering data. While railway companies such as the German Deutsche Bahn have been using this technology for years in their trains, it is now also being used for recording the charging transactions of electric vehicles (EVs).

In the latter case, a mobile electricity meter is integrated either into the vehicle itself or into the respective charging cable. This, together with the necessary communication technology (SIM card), makes it possible to transmit charging data (down to the kWh) to a matching backend. Lean, switchable system sockets suffice for charging – they serve as outlets for the power grid. These system sockets can be reduced to a technical minimum, as the vehicle or the cable, respectively, already carry the necessary billing and communication technology. This makes these sockets especially affordable and avoids running costs compared to conventional charging infrastructure, such as costs for maintenance or meter point operation.

As a result, precise metering, secure data transmission and efficient billing fulfill all preconditions for a comprehensive and future-proof charging and billing solution for electric mobility.

== Development ==
The mobile meter was developed in the projects „On Board Metering I & II“, that kicked off in March 2003, sponsored by the German ministry for economic affairs and technology. Participants of the project were:

- ITF-EDF Fröschl Ltd. (Specialist for control centers)
- PTB, The National Metrology Institute of Germany
- VOLTARIS Ltd. (Specialists for metering and energy services)
- ubitricity Gesellschaft für verteilte Energiesysteme mbH (Mobile electricity provider / project leader)

== Aims of the project ==
The project's approach to electric mobility was not tackling it as a singular challenge. The aim was rather to make a significant contribution to the energy transition by taking electric mobility one step further.

For this to happen, the EV was to become a system-relevant factor as an energy storage device. The goal was to create as much power grid connection points as possible while at the same time safeguarding exact metering and billing of electricity. This way, the vehicle could gain access to the grid anytime it is parked (ratio of EVs to grid connection points greater than 1). Up to that date, charging infrastructure for electric cars was thought of as stationary, similar to conventional gas stations for combustion cars.

For this, a shift of technology from the infrastructure to the vehicle side (or the cable, respectively) was needed. Such a network of ubiquitous charging spots was only to be realized with charging infrastructure that would cause comparably low costs over longer periods of time.

== Potentials of the model ==
The disruptive approach of mobile metering has by now opened up new possibilities and business models for electric mobility.

- Contribution to grid stability. Electric cars can be integrated into the grid as intelligent storage devices. This makes it easier to incorporate the fluctuating electricity production from renewable resources into the overall grid architecture.
- The technology shift from the infrastructure to the vehicle/cable reduces the cost of charging spots. A ubiquitous roll-out of charging infrastructure can be executed with much lower capital investments.
- Free choice of electricity provider and exact billing. The electricity contract can be closed for the vehicle or cable thanks to the mobile meter, while the choice of the respective provider is free.

== Bibliography ==
Weil/Neumann (January 2016). "Vergleichende Betrachtung der Sicherheitskonzepte von Mobile Metering und Smart Meter Gateways". Physikalisch-technische Bundesanstalt (National Metrology Institute of Germany). 125: 53–58.

PTB-Anforderungen 50.7 (PTB-A 50.7) Elektronische und softwaregesteuerte Messgeräte und Zusatzeinrichtungen für Elektrizität, Gas, Wasser und Wärme. PTB (National Metrology Institute of Germany). 2002.
