= William Henry Chase =

Florida planter and militia leader (1798–1870)

- Born: June 4, 1798; Buckfield (Chase's Mill), Massachusetts, later Buckfield, Maine
- Died: February 8, 1870 (aged 71); Pensacola, Florida
- Burial place: Pensacola, Florida
- Military career
- Allegiance: United States; Confederate States
- Branch: U.S. Army Corps of Engineers; Florida militia
- Service years: 1815–1856, USA; 1861, Florida militia (later CSA)
- Rank: Major (USA); Major General (CSA)
- Conflicts: American Civil War

William Henry Chase (June 4, 1798 – February 8, 1870) was a Florida militia colonel during the events in early 1861 that led to the American Civil War (Civil War). On January 15, 1861, on behalf of the State and Governor of Florida, Colonel Chase demanded the surrender of Fort Pickens at Pensacola, Florida and of its U.S. Army garrison. Chase had designed and constructed the fort while he was a captain in the United States Army Corps of Engineers. Lieutenant Adam J. Slemmer, commander of the fort, refused the surrender demand. An informal truce between the administration of President James Buchanan and Florida officials, including their still sitting U.S. Senators, avoided military action at Pensacola until after the Battle of Fort Sumter in April 1861.

Chase was promoted to major general in the "Army of Florida" (Florida militia) a few days after his first demand for surrender of the fort. His entire military service to the emerging Confederate cause occurred during the secession crisis prior to the Battle of Fort Sumter. Chase repeated his surrender demand on January 18, 1861, but Fort Pickens was never surrendered to militia or Confederate States Army forces during the Civil War.

Chase, a United States Military Academy graduate, served in the U.S. Army Corps of Engineers from 1815 to 1856. He attained the rank of major and became the senior officer of the engineers along the Gulf Coast of the United States, where he was responsible for design, construction and maintenance of a number of forts, including those below New Orleans and at Pensacola, Florida and Key West, Florida.

Chase married into the southern Mathews family and developed plantation and business interests in the Pensacola area while promoting and supervising defense projects, all of which contributed to the growth of Pensacola as a city and thriving port. After his retirement from the U.S. Army, he was a slave owner, banker, president of the Alabama and Florida Railroad Company and writer in defense of the merits and importance of the cotton economy. After his role at the beginning of the Fort Pickens confrontation, the 62-year-old Chase returned to the operation of his business interests and took no part in the Civil War.

== Early life ==
William Henry Chase was born in Buckfield (Chase's Mills), Massachusetts, now Buckfield, Maine, on June 4, 1798. His parents were Thomas Chase, member of an old Massachusetts family, and Sarah (Greenleaf) Chase, niece of John Hancock, president of the Second Continental Congress, signer of the United States Declaration of Independence and first and third Governor of Massachusetts.

Chase graduated from Phillips Academy, Class of 1812, and the United States Military Academy at West Point, New York in 1815. He was ranked thirteenth of forty in a class which included future explorer Benjamin Bonneville and Confederate Army General, Adjutant General and Inspector General Samuel Cooper.

== United States Army service ==
Upon graduation from West Point, William H. Chase was appointed brevet second lieutenant in the Army Corps of Engineers and was assigned as an assistant engineer in the construction of the defenses of Brooklyn, New York. In 1816–1817, he was engaged in making surveys in the vicinity of Lake Champlain, New York. Chase worked on the repair of Fort Niagara, New York in 1817–1818. He was appointed second lieutenant on April 15, 1818. Chase spent almost all of the remaining 38 years of his U.S. Army career working in the Gulf Coast States.

Chase began his duties in the Southern States as an assistant engineer in construction of Fort Pike, Louisiana in 1819–1822. He was promoted to first lieutenant on March 31, 1819. He was assigned as superintending engineer of the defenses of the Rigolets and Chef Menteur Passes of the Mississippi River in 1822. He worked on the defenses of Fort Jackson, Louisiana in 1823–1824. In 1824, he briefly returned to the north to supervise improvements in the breakwater at Plymouth Beach, Massachusetts.

On January 1, 1825, Chase was promoted to captain. Between 1824 and 1828, he was superintending engineer of forts at the Rigolets, Chef Menteur, Bienvenue and Bayou Dupre Passes to New Orleans. He also conducted inspections of improvements on the Ohio River in 1825, on the Great Raft in the Red River in 1828 and on sites for lighthouses between Lake Pontchartrain, Louisiana and Mobile Bay, Alabama in 1829.

In 1828, Chase was assigned as superintending engineer of the harbor defenses of Pensacola, Florida. Although he had several other assignments during the time of this assignment, he held the position at Pensacola until 1854. From 1829 to 1834, Chase was engaged in the construction of Fort Pickens in the harbor near Pensacola, Florida.

In 1829, Chase also worked as superintending engineer on improvements on the Pascagoula River in Mississippi. He was further assigned as superintending engineer for improvements on the Escambia River in 1833–1834, of Choctaw Pass in Mobile harbor and Heron Bayou in 1834–1837, on Fort Morgan, Alabama in 1834–1841, on Fort Jackson, Louisiana in 1835–1841, of improvements at the mouth of the Mississippi River in 1834–1837 and of deepening Dog River Bar at Mobile Bay in 1837.

On July 7, 1838, Chase was promoted to major and became the senior officer of engineers on the Gulf Coast. He was now constructing forts mainly with rented slave labor, making him the largest renter of slaves on the Gulf Coast. From 1840 to 1844, Chase supervised the construction of Fort Barrancas at Pensacola.

In 1844, Chase began service on special boards of engineers for examination of various improvements, including Florida Reef in 1844–1845; the Gulf frontier of Mississippi and Texas in 1845; briefly, the Atlantic Coast Defenses in 1848; the Memphis Tennessee Navy Yard in 1851; the floating dock and other improvements at the Pensacola Navy Yard in 1851; the United States Custom House at New Orleans in 1851; and the Passes of the Mississippi River and Harbor at Lake Pontchartrain in 1852.

Chase's service with the Corps of Engineers concluded with tenures as superintending engineer of the improvement of Choctaw Pass and Dog River Bar at Mobile Bay between 1852 and 1854 and of construction of Fort Taylor at Key West, Florida between 1852 and 1854. This assignment engaged Chase in the construction of the second of the three Florida forts which remained under the control of the Union Army throughout the Civil War.

In 1856, Chase refused appointment as superintendent of the United States Military Academy at West Point, stating that he feared the appointment would injure his health. One historian states that Chase's refusal of the West Point appointment was due to his immersion in his business interests at Pensacola. Chase resigned from the U.S. Army on October 31, 1856.

Chase published several tracts on engineering matters, including a joint publication with other officers concerning levees on the Mississippi River, as well as a promotional pamphlet on Pensacola real estate sales. Among those publications were: Brief Memoir Explanatory of a New Trace of a Front of Fortification in Place of the Present Bastioned Front. New Orleans: The Jeffersonian, 1846. OCLC 31885914 and Memoir on the defence of the Gulf of Mexico and the strategic principles governing the national defences. New Orleans: The Jeffersonian, 1846. OCLC 27280418

== Life at Pensacola ==
Chase also was setting up a bank at Pensacola and acquiring property and developing land and lots in the Pensacola area in particular during his army career. One historian, who also details Chase's private dealings at greater length, notes that Chase's private activities might land him in prison today but that in those days the lines between military, government and private interests were blurred at best.

In 1849, Chase prepared a report favoring construction of a railroad between Pensacola and Montgomery, Alabama for the committee formed to find the ways and means to construct such a railway. In 1853, Chase was among the incorporators of the Alabama and Florida Railroad Company after it received approval from the Florida legislature. After his retirement from the U.S. Army in 1856, Chase was president of the Alabama and Florida Railroad Company from 1856 until 1861.

Following his resignation from the U.S. Army on October 31, 1856, Chase operated his business interests in the Pensacola area, was a city alderman for Pensacola and wrote nationally syndicated articles promoting the power and importance of the cotton economy, "King Cotton." He married Ann Paul Mathews.

== Fort Pickens crisis service ==
A Florida convention passed an ordinance of secession on January 10, 1861. Just three weeks after South Carolina had passed an ordinance of secession, Florida became the third State to secede from the Union. Florida officials immediately began to seize federal property. Florida Governor Madison Starke Perry appointed William Henry Chase as colonel of the Florida militia to command forces ordered to seize the federal forts and property around Pensacola because of his intimate familiarity with the property and his former position as a senior U.S. Army officer. About 800 Florida troops had gathered at Pensacola when Chase took command a few days later.

Lieutenant Adam J. Slemmer, who had 81 men to man the forts at Pensacola, abandoned Fort Barrancas, Barrancas Barracks and Fort McRee on January 10, 1861. Much like the circumstances with Fort Sumter at Charleston, South Carolina, an unused fort was located on an island in the harbor and dominated its entrance. Slemmer moved his men to this fort, Fort Pickens on Santa Rosa Island on January 10. On January 12, 1861, Florida state troops took over Fort Barrancas, Fort McRee and demanded the surrender of Fort Pickens, which Slemmer refused. The commander of the Pensacola Navy Yard, Commodore James Armstrong, who had thirty-eight marines to guard the yard, put up no resistance and surrendered that facility when confronted by about 400 state troops. On the night of January 13, 1861, a small party of armed men was discovered near the fort. A few shots were exchanged but the action did not escalate and the men withdrew.

Naval flag Chase raised at Pensacola in 1861, rendering representation of Southern states' rebellion, January 13 – September 12, 1861 (its design identical to naval flag of Republic of Texas, 1836–1845)

On January 15, 1861, Chase and an aide, Captain Ebenezer Farrand, formerly second in command at the Pensacola Navy Yard, appeared at Fort Pickens to demand the surrender of the fort and garrison. Slemmer and his second in command, Second Lieutenant J. H. Gilman, met Chase outside the fort. Slemmer refused to allow Chase and Farrand in the fort, even though Chase said he had built the fort and would learn nothing from entering it. Slemmer replied that Chase did not know what preparations he had made and Chase proceeded to state his business. Lieutenant Gilman reported that Chase said he wanted to avoid bloodshed and that he had written his demand in proper form and would read it. Lieutenant Gilman reported that Chase's voice shook and his eyes filled with tears as he began his demand that the U.S. Army surrender Fort Pickens, a structure that he had designed and built as a captain with the U.S. Army Corps of Engineers. Chase handed the paper to Farrand to read but Farrand could not see it well at night without his glasses so Gilman had to read it aloud.

Slemmer and Gilman stepped aside and soon returned to say they would reply the next day. Slemmer asked Chase how many men he had, whether he could take the fort by storm and how many men he thought he would lose. Chase replied that he could take the fort but supposed he might lose half of his force. Slemmer responded that he did not believe Chase was willing to make that sacrifice. Chase said that Slemmer must know that Florida could not permit the fort to be held and that an attack would start a civil war. Slemmer said he wanted to consult with the captains of two U.S. Navy vessels in the harbor. The next day, as the Navy vessels withdrew, Slemmer refused the demand for surrender of the fort. He refused a similar demand from Chase on January 18, 1861.

On January 17, 1861, the Florida secession convention authorized a new "Army of Florida" and recommended that William Henry Chase be appointed major general. Governor Perry soon made the appointment.

Florida officials, especially U.S. Senator Stephen Mallory, who did not withdraw from the U.S. Senate until January 21, 1861, worked out an informal arrangement with the Buchanan administration under which Florida would not attack the fort as long as the federal government did not reinforce it. Mallory would soon become Confederate States Secretary of the Navy. The Florida convention expressed appreciation to Chase for his diplomatic handling of the crisis.

On March 9, 1861, the Provisional Confederate Congress established an army for the Confederate States and on March 11, 1861, then Brigadier General Braxton Bragg took over the Florida state forces and assumed command of Confederate forces in Florida. Chase took no further part in the Fort Pickens crisis or the Civil War. On April 12, 1861, the same day that Confederate forces at Charleston, South Carolina began the bombardment of Fort Sumter, the U.S. Navy began landing reinforcements at Fort Pickens. Unlike the location of Fort Sumter, the location of Fort Pickens prevented the Confederates from stopping the landings. The Navy also began the Union blockade of Pensacola harbor. Fort Pickens remained in the hands of the Union Army throughout the war.

== Aftermath ==
After Braxton Bragg took over the Florida state forces at Pensacola for the Confederate States Army and thereby relieved Chase of command, Chase returned to the operation of his business interests and took no further part in the secession crisis or the Civil War.

The official papers of President Abraham Lincoln contain a letter dated June 20, 1861 from the President through United States Secretary of State William Seward to then General-in-Chief Brevet Lieutenant General Winfield Scott in which he suspends the writ of habeas corpus with respect to "Major Chase, lately of the Engineer Corps of the Army of the United States, now alleged to be guilty of treasonable practices against this government." No reference shows that Chase was ever arrested or that anything became of this.

William Henry Chase died on February 8, 1870, at Pensacola, Florida. He was buried at Chasefield plantation on Big Lagoon in Pensacola. A later construction project displaced his remains.

== See also ==
- List of American Civil War generals (Acting Confederate)
