= New Forwarding Company =

- Company type: Joint-stock company
- Founded: 2003
- Headquarters: Moscow, Russia
- Revenue: $925 million (2017; 2021; 2022)
- Operating income: $201 million (2017; 2021; 2022)
- Net income: $143 million (2017; 2021; 2022)
- Total assets: $471 million (2017; 2021; 2022)
- Total equity: $312 million (2017; 2021; 2022)
- Owner: KSP Capital Asset Management LLC (100%)
- Number of employees: 540 (2021)

NFC's locomotive

JSC New Forwarding Company or NFC (Russian: Новая перевозочная компания), is one of the largest independent railway carriers in Russia. It was established in 2003. NFC transports products of mining industries, iron-and-steel works, coal, construction materials, and other goods. Until 2025, it was part of the Globaltrans Group. CEO of the company is Kirill Prokofiev.

== Activity ==
NFC has its fleet of 47,700 (as of 31.12.2024) freight wagons (including open wagons, flat-cars), locomotives, all day round control center, and wagon repair service. NFC transportation geography includes the territory of Russia and the Commonwealth of Independent States countries.

NFC has 10 operational branch offices in Russian Federation.
