= Andrew Barclay Spurling =

American general

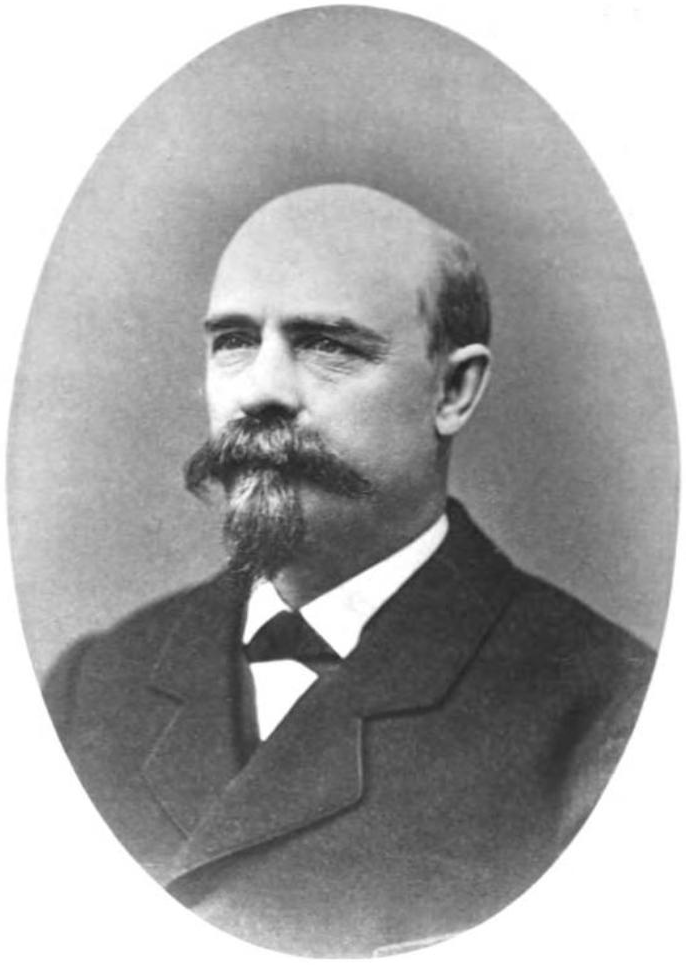
- c. 1887
- Born: March 20, 1833; Cranberry Isles, Maine
- Died: August 22, 1906 (aged 73); Chicago, Illinois
- Burial place: Rosehill Cemetery, Chicago, Illinois
- Military career
- Allegiance: United States of America; Union
- Branch: United States Army; Union Army
- Service years: 1861–1866
- Rank: Lieutenant Colonel; Brevet Brigadier General
- Units: 1st Maine Cavalry Regiment; 2nd Maine Cavalry Regiment
- Conflicts: American Civil War: Actions at Evergreen
- Awards: Medal of Honor
- Other work: Merchant ship captain, sheriff, cowboy, gold prospector, businessman, real estate investor

Andrew Barclay Spurling (March 20, 1833 – August 22, 1906) was an American officer in the Union Army. Serving in the American Civil War, he was awarded the Medal of Honor. He also worked as a merchant ship captain, sheriff, cowboy, gold prospector, businessman, and real estate investor.

== Early life ==
Spurling was born March 20, 1833, in Cranberry Isles, Maine, the son of Captain Samuel L. Spurling and Abigail Hadlock. Both his father and grandfather were seafarers by trade. His grandfather, Captain Benjamin Spurling, was in the War of 1812, and spent time as a prisoner on a British man-of-war. Spurling's father, Captain Samuel Spurling, was master of the schooner Cashier of Cranberry Isles and had several run-ins with pirates in the Caribbean. On at least one occasion he was rewarded for having defeated pirates.

Spurling attended school until the age of 12, when he became a sailor.

== Career ==
=== Early career ===
Spurling remained a sailor until the age of 18, when he moved to California to work as a miner. His health suffered in the mines, and within a couple of years he left mining to become a farmer, having acquired land in the San Jose valley.

At the age of 22, Spurling returned to Maine. He married Harriet S. Black, granddaughter of Colonel Black who served in the War of 1812, in 1855. Following in his father's footsteps, Spurling became captain of a merchant vessel before joining the military in September 1861.

=== American Civil War ===
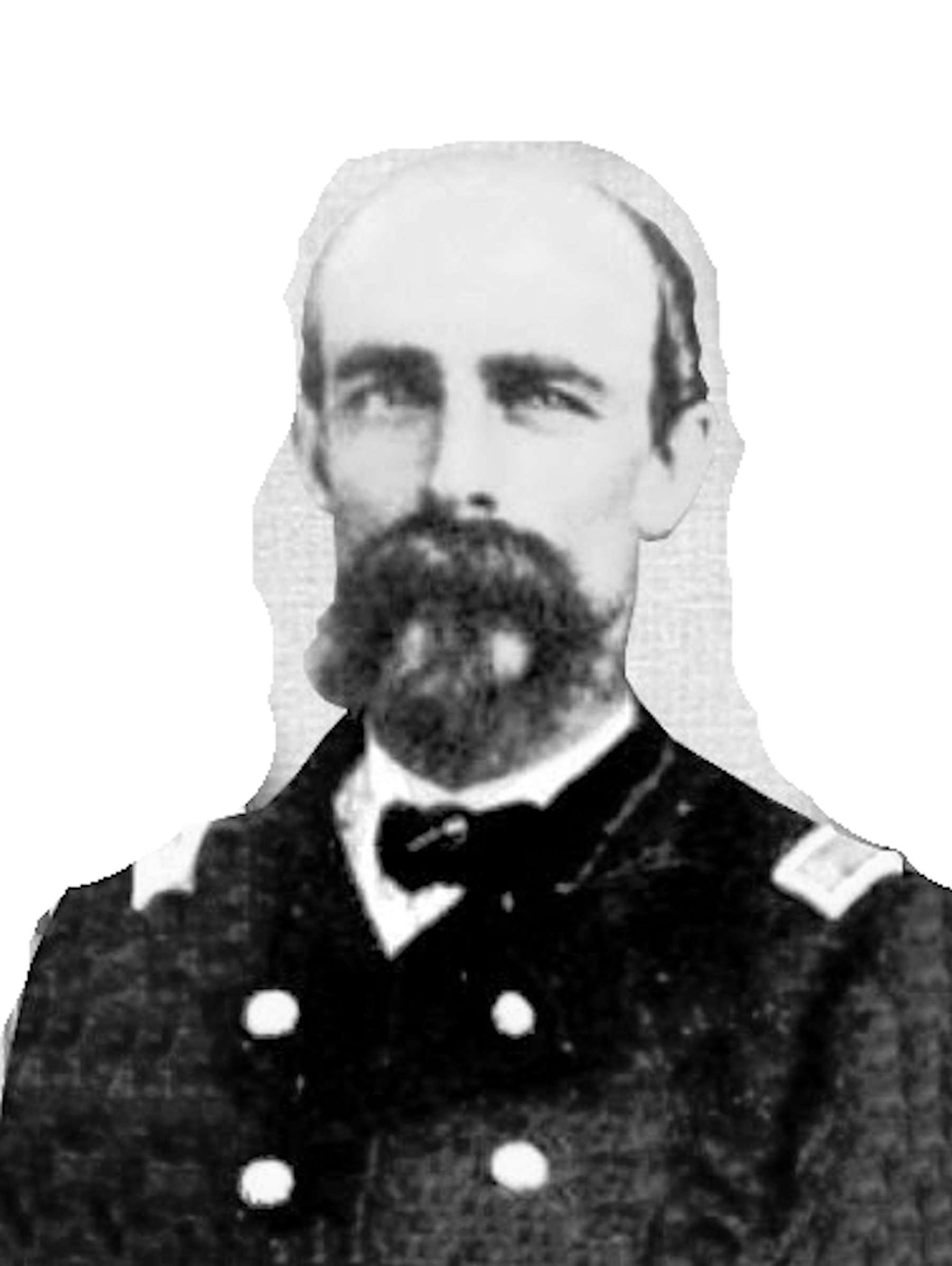
1865

When the Civil War began, Spurling, who had long supported anti-slavery, enlisted in the Union Army. In September 1861 he was commissioned as a first lieutenant of Company D, 1st Maine Cavalry Regiment. He saw action at Middleton and Winchester, Virginia. By February 1863 he had been promoted to the rank of captain. He later served in General David Gregg's cavalry division, where he led his company against J.E.B. Stuart's Confederate troops at the Battle of Brandy Station on June 9, 1863. During the battle, Spurling was hit in the thigh by a pistol ball. He also fought at Middleburg, Virginia, from June 17 to 19, 1863, and again on June 21 at Upperville, Virginia, during which he received several saber wounds to his right hand and arm in hand-to-hand combat.

Captain Spurling was promoted to junior major of the 2nd Maine Cavalry Regiment in January, 1864. Overseeing four companies, he proceeded to Brazier City, Louisiana, where they fought against guerrillas. In June, 1864, Spurling was promoted to lieutenant colonel of the regiment and led troops in combat in Florida later that fall.

During the fall, while serving in Florida, Spurling and a small detachment were ordered to proceed in a different direction than the main expedition and to rejoin later. By the time they rejoined the expedition, Spurling and his 19 men had captured "15 prisoners, 50 horses, several teams, and a large train of cattle, mules, and contrabands, having been absent 5 days, and accomplished all this without the loss of a man." In December 1864, Spurling commanded a brigade that participated in the raid on Pollard, Alabama.

The height of his military career occurred at Evergreen, Alabama, when, in 1865, the company of scouts he was commanding captured three confederate soldiers who were attempting to call reinforcements, a feat for which he received a Medal of Honor in 1897. According to a newspaper at the time:

On that day he captured three Johnnie Rebs single handed, wounding two of them and bringing all three into the Union camp. He was at that time in command of a cavalry expedition and, while visiting his pickets, heard men approaching. Leaving his outpost he advanced in the dark and came upon the three rebels. He fired at them and the fire was returned. Gen. Spurling wounded two of the rebels and proceeded to take the trio back into the Union lines. The official endorsements on his papers in the War Department state that this capture prevented the rebels from obtaining information concerning the movements of Union troops and was of great value to the Union cause.

At the end of the war, Spurling was mustered out and brevetted brigadier general. He had reportedly been wounded a dozen times throughout the war.

=== Post-war career ===
After the Civil War, he returned to sea as a captain in Maine. He left that line of work after being shipwrecked off Cape May. He served four years as sheriff of Hancock County before taking up employment at the U.S. Department of the Interior. Spurling also worked for the Department of Justice, as well as the Postal service where he was a post-office inspector in Chicago, Illinois, for five years.

Spurling, along with two other investors, each of whom invested $50,000, formed the Chicago Rawhide Manufacturing company. The company produced leather belting for machinery. After incorporating the firm, Spurling was elected as its first president and remained president for 12 years.

He was instated as sheriff of Elgin, Illinois, by Mayor Vincent S. Lovell. He garnered a reputation for enforcing the law without partiality. While one newspaper admired this characteristic, some citizens, notably saloon owners, did not appreciate such strict enforcement as it negatively impacted the sale of liquor. As a result, the city council declined to renew his appointment, causing Mayor Lovell to resign his office out of protest.

Spurling, now wealthy, began to invest in real estate. His goal was to build Elgin's first skyscraper. Construction on the five-story steel-framed building began in 1891, but work was delayed due to the Homestead Strike at the Carnegie Steel Company. The project ended up costing approximately $105,000, much of which was borrowed. A year later, an economic depression (the Panic of 1893) and the ensuing failure of many businesses, resulted in a lack of tenants for Spurling's large building. The project's financial backers foreclosed and Spurling lost much of his wealth, as well as his stake in the Chicago Rawhide Manufacturing company.

After losing a campaign for sheriff of Kane County, Spurling returned to Chicago, where he remained until his death.

== Death ==
Spurling suffered an apoplectic stroke on October 19, 1900, after which he retired from business activities. At this time he was living at 77 Maple Street in Chicago, Illinois.

Spurling suffered "heart trouble" in August 1906. He died August 22, at the age of 73, in Chicago's Homeopathic Hospital. Spurling is buried at Rosehill Cemetery in Chicago.

== See also ==
- List of American Civil War brevet generals
