= 2nd Maine Cavalry Regiment =

- Active: November 30, 1863 – December 21, 1865
- Country: United States
- Allegiance: Union
- Branch: Cavalry
- Engagements: Red River Campaign (detachment); Battle of Marianna; Battle of Fort Blakeley

The 2nd Maine Cavalry Regiment was a cavalry regiment that served in the Union Army during the American Civil War.

== Service ==
The 2nd Maine Cavalry was organized in Augusta, Maine November 30, 1863, through January 2, 1864, and mustered in for three years' service under the command of Colonel Ephraim W. Woodman.

The regiment was attached to District of La Fourche, Department of the Gulf, to July 1864. Pensacola, Florida, District of West Florida, Department of the Gulf, to October 1864. 2nd Brigade, District of West Florida, Department of the Gulf, to February 1865. 2nd Brigade, Lucas' Cavalry Division, Steele's Command, Military Division of West Mississippi, to April 1865. District of Florida to December 1865.

The 2nd Maine Cavalry mustered out of service December 6, 1865, and was discharged December 21, 1865, in Augusta.

== Detailed service ==
Left Maine April 1864. Duty in the Defenses of New Orleans, La., until May 26, 1864. Moved to Thibodeaux, La., May 26. Duty there and scout and picket duty in the District of La Fourche by detachments until July 27. (Companies A, D, and G detached and moved to Alexandria, Louisiana, April 16–21. Red River Campaign April 21-May 22. Duty at Alexandria, La., until May 13. Retreat to Morganza May 13–22, Marksville or Avoyelle's Prairie May 15. Mansura May 16. Yellow Bayou May 18. Rejoined regiment at Thibodeaux June 1.) Moved to Algiers, then to Pensacola, Florida, July 27-August 11, and duty there until March 1865. Milton, Florida, August 25, 1864. Expedition from Fort Barrancas to Marianna September 18-October 4. Euche Anna C. H. September 23. Marianna September 27. Expedition up Blackwater Bay October 25–28. Milton October 26. Expedition from Barrancas to Pine Barren Creek November 16–17. Pine Barren Creek November 17. Expedition to Pollard, Ala., December 13–19. Bluff Springs and Pollard December 15. Escanabia Bridge December 15–16. Pine Barren Ford December 17–18. (A detachment at Pascagoula, Mississippi, December 1864 to February 6, 1865.) Expedition from Barrancas to Milton February 22–25, 1865. Milton February 23. Steele's march to Mobile, Ala., March 18–31. (Dismounted men remained at Barrancas, Fla.) Near Evergreen, Alabama March 24. Muddy Creek, Ala., March 26. Near Blakely April 1. Siege of Fort Blakely April 1–9. Assault and capture of Fort Blakely April 9. Occupation of Mobile April 12, March to Montgomery April 13–25. Duty in Alabama with XVI Corps until August, and in western and middle Florida by detachments to December.

== Casualties ==
The regiment lost a total of 344 men during service; 2 officers and 8 enlisted men killed or mortally wounded, 334 enlisted men died of disease.

== Commanders ==
- Colonel Ephraim W. Woodman

== Notable members ==
- James A. Linscott (1846–1913)
- LTC Andrew B. Spurling (1833–1906), Medal of Honor recipient for action at Evergreen, Alabama, on March 23, 1865

== See also ==
- List of Maine Civil War units
- Maine in the American Civil War
