= Pollard, Alabama =

- Town
- Location of Pollard in Escambia County, Alabama.
- Coordinates: 31°01′25″N 87°10′25″W
- Country: United States
- State: Alabama
- County: Escambia

Area
  - Total: 1.12 sq mi (2.89 km^{2})
  - Land: 1.11 sq mi (2.88 km^{2})
  - Water: 0.0039 sq mi (0.01 km^{2})
- Elevation: 62 ft (19 m)

Population (2020)
  - Total: 128
  - Density: 115.1/sq mi (44.45/km^{2})
- Time zone: UTC-6 (Central (CST))
  - Summer (DST): UTC-5 (CDT)
- ZIP code: 36441
- Area code: 251
- FIPS code: 01-61536
- GNIS feature ID: 2407141

Pollard is a town in Escambia County, Alabama, United States. At the 2020 census, the population was 128.

== History ==
Pollard was the first established county seat of Escambia County, from its creation in 1868 until 1883, when it lost that distinction to Brewton. The community is named for Charles T. Pollard, the founder of the Alabama and Florida Railroad. This railroad constructed a line which connect Pollard with Montgomery and Pensacola.

During the Civil War, the Confederate States Army constructed Camp Pollard just north of the town, which protected the railroad junction and served as a training camp. In December 1864, Brigadier General Alexander Asboth commanded Colonel George Robinson to lead a force from Fort Barrancas to attack Pollard with the goal of destroying the Mobile and Great Northern Railroad junction. This force was made up of two regiments: the 1st Regiment, commanded by Lieutenant Colonel G. E. Yarrington, consisted of the 82nd, 86th, and 97th United States Colored Infantry Regiment, while the 2nd Regiment was commanded by Lt. Col. Andrew Barclay Spurling and included the 2nd Maine Cavalry Regiment, 1st Florida Cavalry Regiment, and 14th New York Cavalry Regiment. On December 16, 1864, the detachment found Pollard abandoned by local Confederate forces and destroyed the local railroad bridges and burned most of the town.

== Geography ==
Pollard is located in south-central Escambia County 1.5 miles (2.4 km) south and east of U.S. Routes 31 and 29, 6 miles (10 km) east of Flomaton, and 9 miles (14 km) southwest of Brewton.

According to the U.S. Census Bureau, the town has a total area of 1.1 square miles (2.9 km^{2}), all land.

== Demographics ==
Historical population
Census	Pop.	Note	%±
1880	347		—
1890	389		12.1%
1900	267		−31.4%
1910	599		124.3%
1920	631		5.3%
1930	304		−51.8%
1940	339		11.5%
1950	271		−20.1%
1960	210		−22.5%
1970	86		−59.0%
1980	144		67.4%
1990	100		−30.6%
2000	120		20.0%
2010	137		14.2%
2020	128		−6.6%
U.S. Decennial Census

As of the census of 2000, there were 120 people, 48 households, and 33 families residing in the town. The population density was 107.6 inhabitants per square mile (41.5/km^{2}). There were 64 housing units at an average density of 57.4 per square mile (22.2/km^{2}). The racial makeup of the town was 51.67% White, 41.67% Black or African American, 1.67% Native American, 0.83% from other races, and 4.17% from two or more races. 1.67% of the population were Hispanic or Latino of any race.

There were 48 households, out of which 31.3% had children under the age of 18 living with them, 50.0% were married couples living together, 14.6% had a female householder with no husband present, and 29.2% were non-families. 29.2% of all households were made up of individuals, and 12.5% had someone living alone who was 65 years of age or older. The average household size was 2.50 and the average family size was 3.09.

In the town, the population was spread out, with 27.5% under the age of 18, 6.7% from 18 to 24, 22.5% from 25 to 44, 23.3% from 45 to 64, and 20.0% who were 65 years of age or older. The median age was 41 years. For every 100 females, there were 106.9 males. For every 100 females age 18 and over, there were 93.3 males.

The median income for a household in the town was $26,875, and the median income for a family was $28,750. Males had a median income of $41,250 versus $17,813 for females. The per capita income for the town was $11,410. There were 22.6% of families and 26.6% of the population living below the poverty line, including 36.4% of under eighteens and 30.4% of those over 64.

== Education ==
Escambia County Public School System is the local school district.
