= Yamal Railway =

Railway operator in Yamalo-Nenets Autonomous Okrug, Russia

- Type: Joint-stock company
- Industry: Rail transport
- Founded: 2003
- Headquarters: Novy Urengoy, Russia
- Revenue: $36.9 million (2017)
- Operating income: $711,673 (2017)
- Net income: $1.12 million (2017)
- Total assets: $13.6 million (2017)
- Total equity: $7.1 million (2017)

Map of Yamal Railway lines (2019)

Yamal Railway is a railway operator in Yamalo-Nenets Autonomous Okrug in Russia.

== Main information ==
The company was created in 2003 by the Yamal administration and Russian Railways.

The main activity is the operation of the lines Korotchaevo – Novy Urengoy–Nadym and Korotchaevo–Novy Urengoy–Yamburg.

Projects of the Yamal railway company:

- The completion and restoration of the railway line Obskaya–Salekhard–Nadym;
- The construction of new railway line midnight – art Ob-2 (the project was suspended in February 2012 in the absence of reliable data on the availability of industrial mineral reserves on the Eastern slope of the Urals);
- The completion and restoration of the line Korotchaevo–Igarka.

The branch Novy Urengoy–Pangody–Nadym was restored in the 1970s, part of the Transpolar mainline.

== Plans ==
The company develops the Obskaya – Polunochnoye railway construction project along the Eastern slope of the Ural Mountains. Investment substantiation for construction of railway track prepares Saint-Petersburg company. Preliminary costs will be not less than 62 billion.

The company also expects to recover the Labytnangi – Nadym Transpolar mainline, which was abandoned in 1953.

Construction of the Obskaya – Polunochnoye railway and full recovery of Transpolar railway required the construction of a bridge across the Ob River. The agreement on construction of the combined rail and road bridge across the Ob was signed in December 2008 by the administration of the Yamal-Nenets Autonomous Okrug and the Federal Agency of railway transport of Russia.

== Ownership ==
Owners of JSC Yamal Railway Company as of December 2015:

- Open Joint-Stock Company "Razvitiya Corporation" (55%)
- Russian Railways (45%)
