= Alabama and Florida Rail Road Company =

The Alabama legislature chartered the Alabama and Florida Rail Road Company in February 1850. The Congress of the United States in legislative session authorized the grant of public lands to the company in May 1856. The Alabama legislature consolidated the Mobile and Great Northern Railroad Company and the Alabama and Florida Railroad Company into the Mobile and Montgomery Railroad Company in 1868.

Operation of some of the company's rail track line succeeded to The Louisville and Nashville Railroad Company.

The company also operated at least some of the Pensacola Railroad.

== See also ==
- Alabama and Florida Railroad (1853–1869)
- M&M Subdivision
