= Alabama and Florida Railroad (1853–1869) =

Historic railroad in Alabama and Florida

Alabama & Florida Railroad
- Line map, courtesy OpenHistoricalMap

Overview
- Dates of operation: 1861–1868
- Successor: Mobile and Montgomery Railroad

The Alabama and Florida Railroad was a line of rail track connecting Pensacola, Florida with Montgomery, Alabama during the late 1850s and early 1860s. The portion of the line in Alabama was first owned by the Alabama and Florida Rail Road Company (of Alabama), while the portion of the line in Florida was owned by the Alabama and Florida Railroad (of Florida).

== First attempt (1834–1838) ==
Citizens of Pensacola, led by William Henry Chase, a captain in the United States Army Corps of Engineers, developed a plan to construct a railroad from Pensacola to the interior of Alabama in the early 1830s. The Florida, Alabama and Georgia Rail Road was chartered by the Florida Territory in February 1834 to build a railroad from Pensacola to the border with Alabama. In December 1834, Alabama chartered the Alabama, Florida and Georgia Rail Road to connect the Florida railroad with Columbus, Georgia. The next year, Florida rescinded the charter for the Florida, Alabama and Georgia Rail Road, and accepted the Alabama chartered Alabama, Florida and Georgia Rail Road as the operator of the proposed line from Pensacola to Columbus, with William Chase as president of the company. Funds were raised with the sale of stock and of bonds issued by the Bank of Pensacola and guaranteed by the Legislative Council of the Territory of Florida, and a roadbed was graded and trestles built from Pensacola to the Escambia River. Strap rail and freight and passenger cars were ordered. The Bank of Pensacola closed during the Panic of 1837. The railroad company managed to obtain some further loans, and sold off much of the equipment it purchased earlier to raise funds. To shorten the length of the railroad, and reduce construction costs, the plan was changed to connect to Montgomery rather than Columbus, but work on the railroad ended in 1838. The Bank of Pensacola failed to pay the interest on the bonds due in 1840, and the Territorial Council repudiated its backing of the bonds.

== Two companies ==
The project for a rail link between Pensacola and Montgomery was revived in the early 1850s. Alabama chartered the Alabama and Florida Rail Road Company (of Alabama) to build a railroad between a town that became known as Pollard, Alabama (just north of the Alabama-Florida state line) and the city of Montgomery, with Charles T. Pollard as president of the said company. In 1853, Florida chartered its own Alabama and Florida Railroad (of Florida), with William Chase as president, to build a railroad from Pensacola to Pollard. Construction on the Florida portion of the line began in Pensacola in 1856 and reached Pollard in 1861. The Alabama portion of the railroad reached Montgomery in May 1861, and through passenger service (a ten-hour trip) was instituted between Montgomery and Pensacola.

The Alabama & Florida Railroad used five-foot gauge tracks. Construction of the rail lines had been financed, in part, by sales of land granted to the rail companies by the Federal government under the Land Grant Act of 1850. The A & F RR (of Alabama) received almost 440,000 acres (180,000 ha) from the Federal government, and the A & F RR (of Florida) received almost 160,000 acres (65,000 ha).

== After the Civil War ==
The Alabama and Florida Railroad suffered severe damage during the Civil War. Most of the rail on the Florida portion of the line was removed, and the engines and rolling stock belonging to the A & F RR (of Florida) were seized by the Confederate government and turned over to the A & F RR (of Alabama) and the Mobile and Great Northern Railroad. (Note: The Mobile and Great Northern Railroad was a line, chartered in 1856 and completed in 1861, running only 67 miles (108 km) from Pollard, Alabama to Tensaw Station (now Hurricane) on the Tensaw River.) The Florida legislature chartered the Pensacola and Louisville Railroad Company in July 1868 to replace the Alabama and Florida Railroad (of Florida). The new company completely rebuilt the line from Pensacola to Pollard. The Pensacola Railroad Company purchased the Pensacola & Louisville RR in 1878, and it in turn was taken over by the Louisville and Nashville Railroad in 1880.

The Alabama and Florida Railroad (of Alabama) and the Mobile and Great Northern Railroad were merged in 1868 to form the Montgomery and Mobile Railroad. The Montgomery and Mobile Railroad was in turn acquired by the Louisville and Nashville Railroad in 1880.

== See also ==
- Pensacola and Atlantic Railroad
