= List of SNCF classes =

List of locomotive and multiple unit classes of SNCF. Classes in bold are in use, whilst those in italics have been withdrawn.

== Numbering Scheme ==
=== Locomotives and Multiple Units ===
Vehicle numbers are three to six digits long. The first (not always present) digit indicates the sector in which that vehicle operates:

- 1: SNCF Voyages: high-speed services, including the TGV
- 2: Intercités: medium-distance services
- 4: SNCF Fret: freight operations
- 5: Transport Express Régional (TER): urban, local and regional services
- 6: SNCF Infra: maintains rail infrastructure, the assets of Réseau ferré de France (RFF)
- 7: Departmental use
- 8: Transilien: commuter services serving Île-de-France

The next (possibly first) two or three digits of a vehicle's number indicate its class, in loose bands corresponding to the traction and power output of the stock:

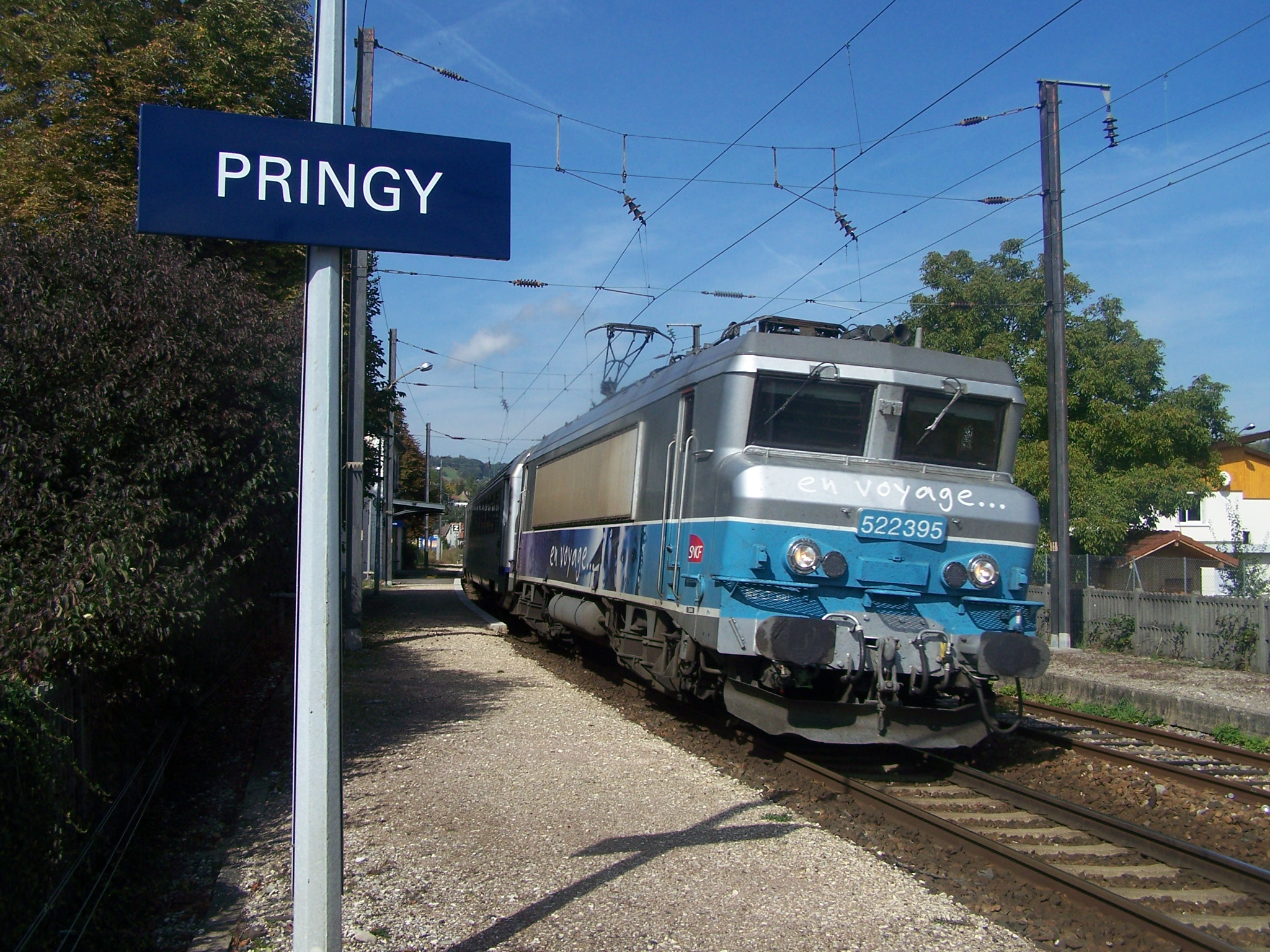
A Class 22200, 195th in series, operating under TER bears the number 522395.

- 0-9999: DC Electric
- 10000-19999: AC Electric
- 20000-29999: Dual Voltage
- 30000-39999: Triple Voltage
- 40000-49999: Quadruple Voltage
- 60000-79999: Diesel

The final digits uniquely identify the engine within its class, but in the case of a three digit class number, the engine number may begin adding to the class number (for example, a Class 22200 may have a number beginning 222, 223 or 224).

Multiple units are numbered the same as locomotives, but prefixed by X for DMUs or Z for EMUs. Diesel shunters are prefixed Y. A now discontinued practice was to prefix the class number by the wheel arrangement.

=== TGV numbering scheme ===
Each TGV trainset has its own number, found on the nose. Within the set, each vehicle is given its own number. The power cars are numbered by the standard locomotive numbering scheme, prefixed by TGV. The trailers are given a number which consists of the first two digits of the power car's number, followed by the number of the trailer in the set, and finishing with the number of the trainset, prefixed by TGVR or TGVZR, if powered.

== Locomotives ==
=== Electric locomotives ===
==== DC ====
- BB 1-80
- BB 100
- BB 200
- BB 300
- BB 325
- 2D2 500
- BB 800
- BB 900
- CC 1100
- BB 1300
- BB 1400
- BB 1500
- BB 1600
- 2BB2 3200
- 2BB2 3300
- 2CC2 3400
- 1ABBA1 3500
- 1ABBA1 3600
- 1CC1 3700
- 1CC1 3800
- BB 4100
- BB 4200
- BB 4600
- BB 4700
- BB 4730
- 2D2 5000
- 2D2 5100
- 2D2 5200
- 2D2 5300
- 2D2 5400
- 2D2 5500
- CC 6001 (Prototype loco)
- BBB 6002 (Prototype loco)
- BBB 6003 (Prototype loco) (ex-BBB 20003)
- CC 6500
- CC 7000 (Prototype locos)
- BB 7003 (Prototype loco) (ex-BB 15007)
- CC 7100
- **BB 7200**
- BB 8100
- BB 8500
- BB 8700
- BB 9001-9002 (Prototype locos)
- BB 9003-9004 (Prototype locos)
- 2D2 9100
- BB 9200
- BB 9300
- BB 9400
- BB 9700
- BB 9700
- BB 88500
- BB 88500

==== AC ====
- BB 10001 (Prototype loco)
- CC 10002 (Prototype loco) (ex-BB 16655)
- BB 10003 (Prototype loco) (ex-BB 15007)
- BB 10004 (Prototype loco) (ex-BB 15055)
- BB 12000 "Monocabine"
- BB 13000 "Monocabine"
- CC 14000 "Monocabine"
- CC 14100 "Monocabine"
- **BB 15000**
- BB 16000
- BB 16100
- BB 16500
- BB 17000

==== Dual-voltage ====
- CC 20001 (Prototype loco)
- CC 20002 (Prototype loco)
- BBB 20003 (Prototype loco)
- BB 20004 (Prototype loco) (ex-BB 16540)
- BB 20005 (Prototype loco) (ex-BB 16028)
- BB 20006 (Prototype loco) (ex-BB 10001)
- BB 20011-20012 (Prototype locos) (ex-BB 22379 and 22380)
- BB 20100
- C 20150
- BB 20200
- CC 21000
- **BB 22200**
- CC 25000
- BB 25100
- BB 25150
- BB 25200
- BB 25500
- **BB 26000** "Sybic"
- **BB 27000** "Prima"
- **BB 27300** "Prima"
- **CC 92000** (Class 92)

==== Triple-voltage ====
- BB 30000 (Prototype locos)
- **BB 36000** "Astride"
- **BB 36300** "Astride"
- **BB 37000** "Prima"

==== Quadruple-voltage ====
- CC 40100
- **BB 47000** "Prima"

=== Diesel locomotives ===
==== Main-line locomotives ====
- **BB 60000** (Alstom/Vossloh shunters)
- BB 60001 ex (prototype locomotive)
- C 60002 ex-030.DC.1 and 2 (prototype locomotive)
- BB 60011 ex-040.DB.1, exx-PLM 4.AMD.1 (prototype locomotive)
- BB 60021 ex-040.DC.1, exx-PLM 4.CMD.1 (prototype locomotive)
- BB 60031–60033 ex 040.DM.1 to 3, exx PLM 4.DMD.1 to 3 (prototype locomotives)
- BB 60041 ex 040.DF.1 (prototype locomotive)
- 1D1 60051 ex 141.DA.1, exx-PLM 141.AMD.1 (prototype locomotive)
- C 61000 + TC 61100
- **BB 61000**
- A1AA1A 62000
- BB 62400
- BB 63000
- BB 63400
- **BB 63500**
- **BB 64700 + TBB 64800**
- CC 65000
- CC 65500
- **BB 66000**
- **BB 66400**
- BB 66600
- BB 66691–66692
- **BB 66700**
- BB 66900
- BB 67000
- **BB 67200**
- **BB 67300**
- **BB 67400**
- A1AA1A 68000
- A1AA1A 68500
- BB 69000 (prototype locos)
- **BB 69200** (ex-BB 66000 refurbished)
- **BB 69400** (ex-BB 66400 refurbished)
- CC 70000 (prototype locos)
- BB 71000
- **CC 72000**
- **CC 72100**
- **BB 75000** "Prima"
- CC 80000 (former gas-turbine locos)
- 040.DA.1, ex PLM 4.BMD.1 (prototype locomotive)
- 262.DA.1, ex PLM 262.AD.1 (prototype locomotive)
- 262.DB.1, ex PLM 262.BD.1 (prototype locomotive)
- 141.DB.1, ex PLM 141.DB.1, exx Nord D1, né Ceinture D1 (prototype locomotive)

==== Shunting locomotives ====
- Y 2100
- Y 2200
- Y 2400
- Y 5100
- Y 5200
- Y 6000
- Y 6020
- Y 6200
- Y 6400
- Y 7020
- Y 7100
- Y 7400
- **Y 8000**
- **Y 8400**
- **Y 9000** (ex-Y 7100 / Y 7400 refurbished)
- Y 9100
- Y 9200
- Y 11200
- YBD 12000
- YBE 14000
- YBE 15000
- Y 50100
- Y 51100 (ex-Y 9100)
- Y 51200 (ex-Y 9200)
- Y BL

=== Steam locomotives ===
The SNCF adapted the classification system introduced by the Chemins de fer de Paris à Lyon et à la Méditerranée in 1925. This consisted of a numeric prefix derived from the axle (not wheel) arrangement of the locomotive, a letter for the class, and finally a number for the locomotive with the class. SNCF's adaptations included using the axle arrangement in full, and reversing the class letters of tank locomotives. For example, the SNCF used 040.A., and 242.TA. where the PLM used 4.A., and 242.AT.

Class letters A-N were used for existing designs, letters P onwards for SNCF designs. Others railways' designs taken over after World War II were usually given the letter U (American), W (British), X, Y, or Z (German).

Where locomotives were upgraded or rebuilt, the class letter changed, but not the number. While the Region Nord renumbered all their classes from 1, the remaining 4 regions re-used the last three digits of the old number in the new number.

As there were more classes that available letters of the alphabet, the axle arrangement was prefixed with a digit indicating the owning region: 1 Est (former Est and AL lines), 2 Nord 3 Ouest (former État lines) 4 Sud-Ouest (former Paris-Orleans and Midi lines) 5 Sud-Est (former PLM lines). Region 5 was later split in two, with the southern part becoming 6 Mediterranée

Locomotives transferred from one region to another could change their class letter and numeric suffix.

==== 1. Est ====
- 021.A, ex Est 441 to 485
- 220.A, ex Est 2401 to 2432
- 141.TB, ex Est 4401 to 4512
- 141.TC, ex Est 141.701 to 141.742

==== 2. Nord ====
- 231.C, ex Nord 3.1201 to 3.1290
- 040.TG, ex Nord 4.2016 to 4.2095
- 141.TC, ex Nord 4.1201 to 4.1272
- 150.B, ex Nord 5.1201 to 5.1230

==== 3. État ====
- 040.TA, ex État 40-001 to 40-143
- 141.TC, ex État 42-001 to 42-020
- 141.TD, ex État 42-101 to 42-140
- 140.C, ex État 140-101 to 140-370
- 141.B and 141.C, ex État 141-001 to 141-250
- 230.B, ex État 230-001 to 230-055, ex État 3701 to 3755
- 230.J and 230.L, ex État 230-781 to 230-800
- 231.B, ex État 231-011 to 231-060
- 231.C/D/E/F/G/H/J, ex État 231-501 to 231-783
- 231.997, ex État 231-997 to 231-999, ex Württemberg C

==== 4. PO-Midi ====
- 040.TA, ex Midi 040.421 to 040.421, ex Midi 421 to 424
- 141.TA, ex PO 141.301 to 141.490, ex PO 5301 to 5490
- 141.TB, ex PO 141.616 to 141. 740, ex PO 5616 to 5740
- 240.TA, ex Midi 240.501 to 240.518, ex Midi 4501 to 4518

==== 5. PLM ====
- 020.TA, ex PLM 7001 to 7005
- 030.TA, ex PLM 3.AT
- 030.TB, ex PLM 3.AM, rebuilt from PLM Bourbonnais
- 130.TA, ex PLM 130.AT, ex Prussian T9.3
- 130.TB, ex PLM 130.BT, ex Prussian T11
- 232.TA, ex PLM 232.AT, ex PLM 5301 to 5350
- 232.TB, ex PLM 232.BT, ex PLM 5501 to 5545
- 040.TA, ex PLM 4.AM
- 040.TB, ex PLM 4.BM
- 040.TC, ex PLM 4.DM
- 242.TA, ex PLM 242.AT
- 242.TB, ex PLM 242.BT
- 242.TC, ex PLM 242.CT
- 242.TD, ex PLM 242.DT
- 242.TE, rebuilt from 242.TB
- 050.TA, ex PLM 5.AT, ex Prussian T16 and T16.1

==== SNCF ====
SNCF class	Wheel arrangement	Fleet number(s)	Manufacturer	Year(s) made	Quantity made	Year(s) withdrawn	Comments
232.P	4-6-4	232.P.1	SACM	1943	1	1949	18-cylinder high-pressure locomotive
232.Q	4-6-4	232.Q.1	Schneider et Cie	1940	1	1946	Steam turbine locomotive
232.R	4-6-4	232.R.1 – 232.R.3	SACM	1940–41	3	1962	3-cylinder simple
232.S	4-6-4	232.S.1 – 232.S.4	SACM	1941	4	1961	4-cylinder compound
232.U	4-6-4	232.U.1	Corpet-Louvet	1949	1	1961	4-cylinder compound
141.P	2-8-2	141.P.1 – 141.P.318	FAMH (95); Schneider et Cie (43); Société Franco-Belge (60); ANF (30); Batignolles-Châtillon (30); Fives-Lille (30); SACM (30)	1942–1952	318	1959–69	4-cylinder compound
141.R	2-8-2	141.R.1 – 141.R.1340	Baldwin Locomotive Works (460); American Locomotive Company (460); Lima Locomotive Works (280); Montreal Locomotive Works (100); Canadian Locomotive Company (40)	1945–47	1340	1962–74	2-cylinder simple
240.P	4-8-0	240.P.1 – 240.P.25	Tours Works	1940–41	25	1952–53	Rebuilds of PO 4500 class pacifics
241.P	4-8-2	241.P.1 – 241.P.35	Schneider et Cie	1948–52	35	1965–1970	Development of PLM 241.C
242.A.1	4-8-4	242.A.1	Fives-Lille	1950	1	1960	Rebuild of État 241-101
150.P	2-10-0	150.P.1 – 150.P.115	ANF (70); SACM (10); Aciéries du Nord (35)	1940–50	115	1961–68	Development of Nord 5.1200
221.TQ	4-4-2T	221.TQ.1	Compagnie Général de Construction / Batignolles-Châtillon	1949	1	1954	12-cylinder locomotive
050.TQ	0-10-0T	050.TQ.1 – 050.TQ.35	SFCM	1948–49	35	1967–71	Development of Midi 5000-series
151.TQ	2-10-2T	151.TQ.1 – 151.TQ.22	Corpet-Louvet	1940–52	22	1965–68	Development of Ceinture 5000-series
030.W	0-6-0	030.W.1 – 030.W.45	Swindon Works	(1940)	(35)	c.1945	GWR 2301 Class
150.X	2-10-0	150.X.1 – 150.X.226; 150.X.819 ... 150.X.1803	Schneider et Cie; SFCM; Batignolles-Châtillon; Fives-Lille; Lokomotivfabrik Floridsdorf (3)	1944–47	(239)	1957–65	ex-DRG Class 44; 48 sold to Turkey in 1955 as TCDD 56701 Class
150.Y	2-10-0	150.Y.1 – 150.Y.17; 150.Y.123 ... 150.Y.7604	SACM (22) (various: 20)	1942–46	(42)	1959–61	ex DRB Class 52
150.Z	2-10-0	150.Z.11 ... 150.Z.3137	(various)	1939–43	(36)	1951–53	ex DRB Class 50
030.TU	0-6-0T	030.TU.1 – 030.TU.77	Davenport Locomotive Works (77); H. K. Porter, Inc. (27); Vulcan Iron Works (23)	1942–43	(77)	1967–70	ex USATC S100 Class
030.TW	0-6-0T	030.TW.26 ... 030.TW.44	William Beardmore and Company (4); Hunslet Engine Company (1)	(1940)	(5)	1948	LMS Fowler Class 3F, repatriated
030.TX	0-6-0T	030.TX.1 – 030.TX.9	Henschel & Sohn	1942	9	1961–65	Built for the Peking and Mukden Railway, sent to Bordeaux for shipment, but never sent.
131.TX	2-6-2T	131.TX.402 ... 131.TX.493	Maschinenbau-Gesellschaft Karlsruhe (3); Arnold Jung Lokomotivfabrik (1)	1914–18	(4)	1952	ex Baden VI c
040.TX	0-8-0T	040.TX.1 – 040.TX.67	Schneider et Cie	1944–46	67	1961–71	ex KDL 4/ELNA 6
050.TX	0-10-0T	050.TX.1–050.TX.37	FAMH	1944–45	37	1961–68	EX KDL 5

== Multiple units ==
=== TGV ===
- **TGV Atlantique**
- **TGV Duplex**
- **TGV La Poste**
- **TGV M**
- **TGV POS** (Paris - Ostfrankreich - Süddeutschland)
- **TGV Réseau**
- TGV Sud-Est
- **TGV-TMST** (Trans-Manche Super Train, also known as the Class 373)
- **TGV Thalys PBA** (Paris-Brussels-Amsterdam)
- **TGV Thalys PBKA** (Paris-Brussels-Köln/Amsterdam)

=== Diesel and gas-turbine multiple units ===
==== Diesel units metre gauge ====
- X 200 (Verney)(Blanc-Argent railway)
- X 240 (Blanc-Argent railway)
- **X 74500** (Blanc-Argent railway)

==== Diesel units standard gauge ====
- X 1500 (ex-Diesel unit T 1500 from ETG)
- X 2100
- X 2200
- X 2400
- X 2700 (RGP)
- X 2720 (RGP)
- X 2770 (RGP)
- X 2800
- X 3000
- X 3400
- X 3500
- X 3600
- X 3700
- X 3800
- X 4200
- X 4300
- X 4500
- X 4630
- X 4750
- X 4790
- X 4900
- X 5500
- X 5800
- **X 72500**
- **X 73500**
- **X 73900**
- **X 76500**
- X 94750 (Parcels units)
- X 94630 (Cannes-Ranguin)
- X 97150 (A2E)

==== Trailers ====
- XR 6000
- XR 6100
- XR 6200
- XR 7100
- XR 7300
- XR 7800
- XR 8100
- XR 9100
- XR 9200
- XR 9300
- XR 9500

==== Turbotrains ====
- T 1000 (Turbine unit in ETG)
- T 1500 (Diesel unit in ETG)
- T 2000 (RTG)
- TGV 001

=== Electric multiple units ===
==== DC 3rd-rail units metre gauge ====
- **Z 100** (Cerdagne railway)
- **Z 150** (Cerdagne railway)
- **Z 200** (Cerdagne railway)
- Z 300 (Cerdagne railway)
- Z 600 (St-Gervais-Vallorcine railway)
- **Z 800** (St-Gervais-Vallorcine railway)
- **Z 850** (St-Gervais-Vallorcine railway)

==== DC 3rd-rail units standard gauge ====
- Z 1200
- Z 1300
- Z 1400
- Z 1500
- Z 5177

==== DC units ====
- Z 3600
- Z 3700
- Z 3800
- Z 4100
- Z 4200
- Z 4400
- Z 4500
- Z 4900
- Z 5100
- Z 5300
- **Z 5600** (Double-decker)
- Z 7100
- Z 7300 (Z2)
- Z 7500 (Z2)

==== AC units ====
- Z 6000
- Z 6100
- Z 6300
- Z 6400
- Z 8001-8002 (Prototype units)
- **Z 11500** (Z2)

==== Dual-voltage units ====
- **Z 8100**
- **Z 8800** (Double-decker)
- Z 9500 (Z2)
- Z 9600 (Z2)
- **Z 20500** (Double-decker)
- **Z 20900** (Double-decker)
- **Z 21500**
- **Z 22500** (Double-decker)
- **Z 23500** (Double-decker)
- **Z 24500** (Double-decker)
- **U 25500** (Light-rail)
- **Z 26500** (Double-decker)
- **Z 27500**
- **Z 50000**
- **Z 51500**
- **Z 54900**
- **Z 55500 and Z 56500**
- **Z 92050** (Double-decker)

==== Bi-mode units ====
- **B 81500**
- B 82500
- **B 83500**
- **B 84500**
- **B 85000**
- **B 85900**
