= SNCF Class 1D1 60051 =

French prototype diesel locomotive

PLM 141 AMD 1 SNCF 1D1 60051
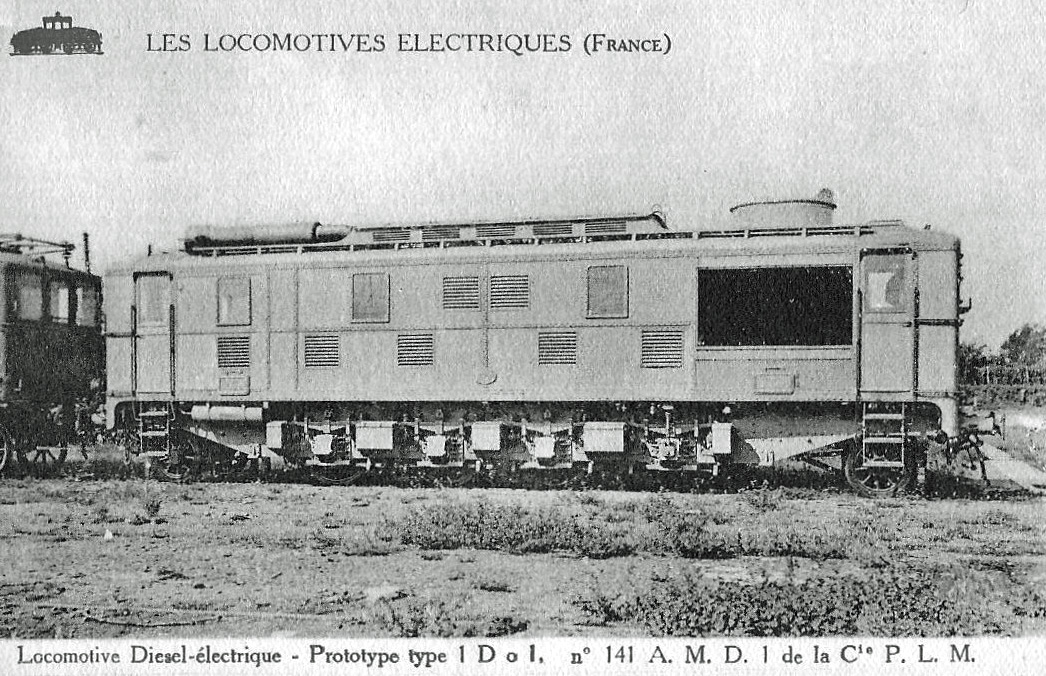
- PLM 141 AMD 1, later 1D1 60051
Type and origin
- Power type: Diesel-electric
- Builder: CEF
- Build date: 1934
- Total produced: 1
Specifications
- Configuration
  - UIC: 1′Do1′
- Gauge: 1,435 mm (4 ft 8 1/2 in) standard gauge
- Length
  - Over beams: 14.000 m (45 ft 11 1/8 in)
- Loco weight: 94.640 t (93.145 long tons; 104.323 short tons)
- Prime mover: MAN
- Engine type: Diesel
- Traction motors: 4 × CEF
- Transmission: Electric
Performance figures
- Maximum speed: 70 km/h (43 mph)
- Power output
  - Continuous: 600 hp (450 kW) (1934-1952); 750 hp (560 kW) (1952-)
Career
- Operators: PLM then SNCF
- Numbers: PLM 141 AMD 1; SNCF 141 DA 1; SNCF 1D1 60051
- Withdrawn: 1967

1D1 60051 was a class of one prototype diesel-electric locomotive built for the PLM in 1934 by CEF.

The diesel locomotive was numbered as 141 AMD 1 when with the PLM, and was included in the inventory of the SNCF at its inception in 1938. It was numbered as 141 DA 1 in the 1950s, before the renumbering of 1962.

It was equipped with a MAN diesel engine of 600 hp (450 kW), replaced in 1952 by a 750 hp (560 kW) engine.

== See also ==
- List of SNCF classes
