= 2400 class =

2400 class or Class 2400 may refer to:

- CFL Class 2400, electric multiple units
- NS Class 2400 (disambiguation)
- Queensland Railways 2400 class, diesel-electric locomotives
