= SNCF Class BB 30000 =

SNCF BB 30000
Type and origin
- Power type: Electric
- Builder: Fives-Lille, CEM, MTE
- Build date: 1961
- Total produced: 2
Specifications
- Configuration
  - AAR: B-B
  - UIC: B′B′
- Gauge: 1,435 mm (4 ft 8 1/2 in)
- Length: 14.4 m (47 ft 3 in)
- Loco weight: 69 tonnes (68 long tons; 76 short tons)
- Electric system/s: Catenary; 1.5 kV DC; 3 kV DC; 25 kV 50 Hz AC
- Current pickup(s): Pantograph
- Traction motors: Two 1.5 kV DC SW 6308 traction motors
- Safety systems: Crocodile
Performance figures
- Maximum speed: 150 km/h (93 mph)
- Power output: 2,250 kW (3,020 hp)
Career
- Operators: SNCF
- Numbers: BB 26001 and BB 26002 (1961–64); BB 30001 and BB 30002 (1964–retired)
- Nicknames: Vespa tricourant
- First run: 1961
- Retired: 1970 (BB30002, damaged by fire); 1974 (BB 30001)

The SNCF Class BB 30000 electric locomotives were built by Fives-Lille, CEM and MTE in 1961. They were the tri-current version of BB 9400 "Vespa" locomotives, of which they were closely derived, and inherited much of the knowledge of the experiences of BB 20004.

== History ==
With electrification of the mayor European axes pending in the late-1950s, SNCF engineers dreamed of a locomotive type which could operate of all 4 major European currents: 1.5 kV DC, 3 kV DC, 15 kV 16.7 Hz AC and 25 kV 50 Hz AC. Unfortunately, the technology to develop such kinds of locomotives wasn't advanced enough at that time. Therefore, the engineers stuck to the idea of realizing a reliable series of dual-voltage locomotive first.

But, with the electrification of the Paris-Brussels line pending, the engineers wanted to modify the locomotives so that they also could operate of the Belgian 3 kV DC. As the locomotive had still primitive DC motors, this could be done by connecting them together in series or series-parallel.

In 1961 the 2 locomotives were delivered as BB 26001 and BB 26002 and closely resembled to their DC counterparts BB 9400, but had also some differences: they had already double lights (one couple for white, one couple for red) instead of a single couple on BB 9400/BB 16000 series and their pantographs were inverted.

== Career ==
BB 26002 pulled the very first commercial train on the fully electrified Paris-Brussels line on 9 September 1963. For the first 4 years the locomotives operated in pool with the Belgian HLE 15 locomotives but after the arrival of the stronger CC 40100 series, they pulled the lighter trains between Paris and Belgium due to their low power. They were also renumbered in BB 30001 and BB 30002 in 1963. BB 30002 was retired in 1970 after it was damaged by a fire, BB 30001 followed in 1974.
