= SNCF Class BB 900 =

Class of Pre WW2 French electric locomotives

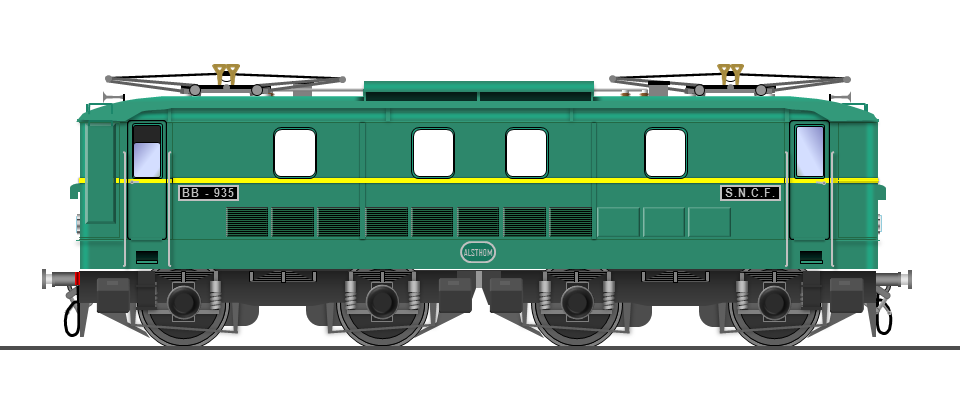
Type and origin
- Power type: Electric
- Builder: Alsthom
- Build date: 1936–1937
- Total produced: 35
Specifications
- Configuration
  - UIC: Bo′Bo′
  - Commonwealth: Bo-Bo
- Gauge: 1,435 mm (4 ft 8 1/2 in)
- Wheel diameter: 1,400 mm (55 in)
- Length
  - Over body: 12.870 m (42 ft 2.7 in)
- Loco weight: 79 t (78 long tons; 87 short tons)
- Electric system/s: 1500 V dc
- Current pickup: Pantograph
- Traction motors: 4 x M1E
Performance figures
- Maximum speed: 105 km/h (65 mph) as built; 75 km/h (47 mph) rebuilt
- Power output
  - Continuous: 1,200 kW (1,600 hp) as built; 1,060 kW (1,420 hp) rebuilt
Career
- Operators: État; SNCF
- Class: BB 900
- Number in class: 25
- Numbers: BB 101– BB 135 (État); BB 901–BB 935 (SNCF)
- Retired: 1987

The SNCF Class BB 900 was a class of 35 mixed-traffic electric locomotives built between 1936 and 1937 for État. The class was a development of the pre-war Midi Class E4700 and very similar to the later Class BB 300 and Class BB 325. Initial use was on the Paris–Le Mans line. The class was withdrawn in 1987 after 50 years in service.

== History ==
=== Context ===
In the early 1930s, the economic crisis hit and the government undertook major works to support employment, known as the Marquet plan. It was in this context that the decision was made to electrify the line from Paris-Montparnasse to Brest, between Paris and Le Mans. In anticipation of the completion of this work, the State company ordered two series of electric locomotives: the Class 2D2 5400 for the passenger services and the BB 900 for freight trains.

The BB 900 were a development of the Midi E 4200 and E 4700 classes. The Midi company had a long experience in electric traction and the BB Midi were very successful. Compared to their predecessors, the new locomotives had different gear ratios, the profile of the line being less hilly than that of the lines of the South. Likewise, they were not fitted with rheostatic braking, being less useful on the plain.

=== Service ===
The class was ordered by État from Alsthom in 1934. The class was originally numbered BB 101–BB 135. Upon delivery, from 1936 to 1937, the class was assigned to the Montrouge depot. Their main duties were operating heavy freight services on the newly electrified Paris-Le Mans line. Some passenger trains are also operated by these locomotives, at the head of Talbot trainsets. A BB 900 at the head of a 100 t (98 long tons; 110 short tons) train could match the running of a Somua Z 3800 railcar. During the tests a speed of 107 km/h (66 mph) would have been sustained.

One locomotive was a casualty of the Second World War. BB 125 was destroyed in July 1944 in the air attack on the Maintenon viaduct by the USAAF.

In the SNCF renumbering scheme of 1950, the class was renumbering BB 901–BB 935, omitting BB 925.

During the 1960s the class underwent major overhauls. Shortly after, some members of the class were transferred to the depot in Limoges, with the remainder following around 1975.

The modernisation of the SNCF electric fleet entailed the gradual withdrawal of the class from 1982 to 1987.

== Technology ==
The technology used was the same as that proven on the Midi machines, with an increase in power compared to the BB 4700. As with their predecessors, the bogies are linked together and include shock devices.

The body was made of welded steel, integrated with the frame. It had two driving cabins. The traction motors were nose suspended: on one side, the motor rests on the central cross member of the bogie supported by helical springs, on the other side it rests on the axle to be driven. The engine/bogie transmission is bilateral, as with all the other BB Midi, with a ratio of 3.273.

Regarding the electrical part, the 4 motors are of the M1E type and had a one-hour rating of 370 kW (500 hp) at 1500 V. They could be connected in series, series-parallel (2 by 2), parallel. Unlike the Midi BB 4700, these locomotives did not have rheostatic electric braking which was deemed unnecessary on the Paris - Le Mans line.

The motors were controlled by means of a 29-notch controller, wired as follows:

- 0: open circuit
- 1 to 10: series operation, on starting resistors
- 11: direct series operation
- 12 to 18: series-parallel, on resistors
- 19: direct series-parallel
- 20 to 27: parallel, on resistors
- 28: full field parallel

In addition to this controller, the driver also had a shunt lever (Note: There are two methods of reducing the inductive field: Reduction in the number of turns used in the excitation winding, Bypass (shunt) of part of the current flowing in the exication winding by a resistor.) with 6 positions allowing "reduced field" operation and a direction switch. The current collection was by two Faiveley pantographs. The high voltage circuit consisted of a double disconnect switch and a circuit breaker. The motors were coupled via a battery of electro-pneumatic contactors.

During the general overhaul, the end doors were removed and the engine control and electrical wiring completely refurbished.

== Fleet list ==
État number	SNCF number	In service	Withdrawn
BB 101	BB 901	1 January 1936	27 April 1984
BB 102	BB 902	1 October 1936	26 June 1984
BB 103	BB 903	1 January 1937	22 January 1985
BB 104	BB 904	1 January 1936	January 1982
BB 105	BB 905	9 December 1937	December 1983
BB 106	BB 906	1 October 1936	December 1983
BB 107	BB 907	3 October 1936	January 1982
BB 108	BB 908	10 October 1936	28 February 1987
BB 109	BB 909	1 January 1936	28 February 1987
BB 110	BB 910	26 October 1936	January 1982
BB 111	BB 911	1 January 1936	7 January 1985
BB 112	BB 912	21 July 1937	12 September 1984
BB 113	BB 913	13 July 1937	January 1982
BB 114	BB 914	27 April 1936	31 May 1985
BB 115	BB 915	6 July 1937	5 March 1987
BB 116	BB 916	6 July 1937	30 August 1985
BB 117	BB 917	3 July 1937	January 1982
BB 118	BB 918	1 January 1937	December 1983
BB 119	BB 919	1 January 1937	January 1982
BB 120	BB 920	1 January 1937	16 April 1985
BB 121	BB 921	1 January 1937	December 1983
BB 122	BB 922	1 January 1937	December 1983
BB 123	BB 923	1 January 1937	30 May 1984
BB 124	BB 924	1 January 1937	3 April 1987
BB 125		1 January 1937	25 July 1944
BB 126	BB 926	1 January 1937	28 February 1987
BB 127	BB 927	1 June 1937	19 March 1984
BB 128	BB 928	10 August 1937	28 February 1987
BB 129	BB 929	1 January 1937	28 February 1987
BB 130	BB 930	5 August 1937	19 March 1984
BB 131	BB 931	1 January 1937	January 1982
BB 132	BB 932	1 January 1937	14 June 1985
BB 133	BB 933	4 August 1937	December 1983
BB 134	BB 934	29 July 1937	December 1983
BB 135	BB 935	13 October 1937	January 1982

== Bibliography ==
- Defrance, Jacques (1978). Le matériel moteur de la SNCF. N.M. La Vie du Rail.
- Dupuy, Jean-Marc (October 2008). "Les BB 901 à 935 ex-État". Le Train (56 spécial): 26–59.
