= SNCF 040.DF =

SNCF 040.DF.1 SNCF BB 60041
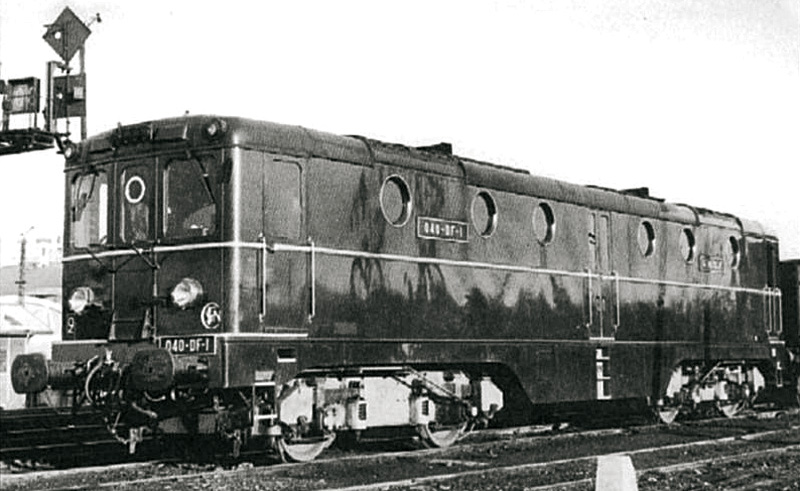
- SNCF 040.DF.1, later BB 60041
Type and origin
- Power type: Diesel-hydraulic
- Builder: Renault
- Build date: 1952
- Total produced: 1
Specifications
- Configuration
  - UIC: B′B′
- Gauge: 1,435 mm (4 ft 8 1/2 in) standard gauge
- Wheelbase: 2.600 metres (8 ft 6 3/8 in), truck
- Pivot centres: 9.000 m (29 ft 6 3/8 in)
- Length: 15.000 m (49 ft 2 1/2 in) over Headstocks; 15.960 m (52 ft 4 3/8 in) over Buffers
- Width: 2.700 m (8 ft 10 1/4 in)
- Height: 3.600 m (11 ft 9 3/4 in)
- Axle load: 13.375 t (13.164 long tons; 14.743 short tons)
- Loco weight: 53.500 t (52.655 long tons; 58.974 short tons)
- Fuel type: Diesel
- Prime mover: Renault 565, 2 off
- Engine type: V12 Diesel
- Cylinders: 12
- Couplers: Buffers and chain
Performance figures
- Maximum speed: 110 km/h (68 mph)
- Power output
  - Starting: 2 x 425 CV (313 kW; 419 hp) = 850 CV (625 kW; 838 hp)
  - Continuous: 495 kW (673 CV; 664 hp)
Career
- Operators: SNCF
- Class: 1952–62: 040.DF; 1962–70: BB 60040
- Numbers: 1952–62: 040.DF.1; 1962–70: BB 60041
- Nicknames: Birgitte
- Withdrawn: 1970
- Disposition: Scrapped

SNCF 040.DF was a class of one prototype diesel-hydraulic locomotive built for the SNCF built in 1952 by Renault.

In 1962 it was renumbered from 040.DF.1 to BB 60041.

Like the 060.DA, it was delivered in a livery of dark green with a yellow stripe.

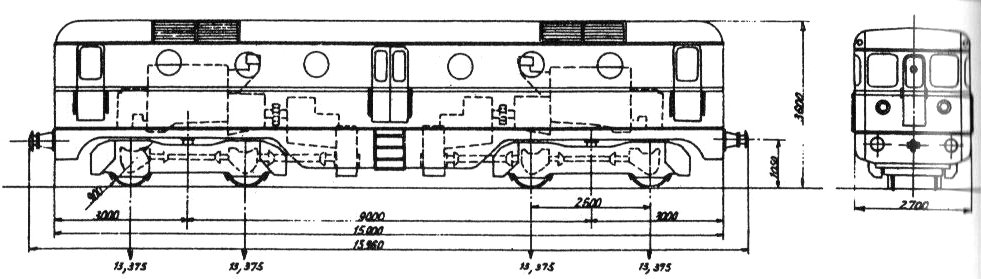
Diagram drawing of the 040.DF.1

== Models ==
The SNCF 040.DF has been produced in HO scale by ApocopA as a cast resin bodyshell for mounting on an underframe of the modelmakers' choice.

== See also ==
- List of SNCF classes
