= NS Class 2400 =

NS Class 2400 designates two classes used by Nederlandse Spoorwegen (NS)

- NS Class 2400 (1954), diesel locomotives built between 1954 and 1957. Withdrawn in 1991; some of them sold to France.
- NS Sprinter Lighttrain, multiple units from class 2400 and 2600 built between 2007 and 2012
