= SNCF Class BB 8100 =

Class of French railway locomotive

SNCF BB 8100
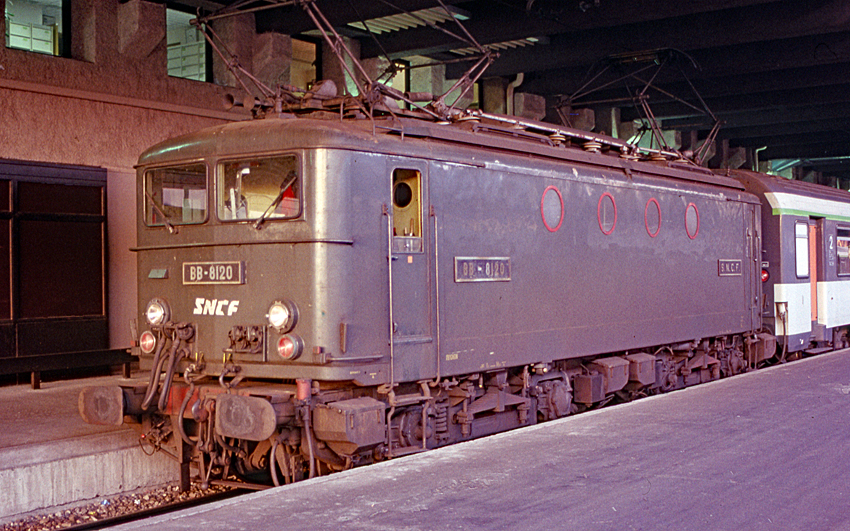
- BB 8120 at Paris Gare de Lyon, December 1989
Type and origin
- Power type: Electric
- Builder: Alsthom-Jeumont-Schneider-OC Oerlikon
- Build date: 1948–1955
- Total produced: 172 SNCF; 60 NS
Specifications
- Configuration
  - UIC: B'B'
- Gauge: 1,435 mm (4 ft 8 1/2 in) standard gauge
- Length: 12.93m
- Width: 2.988m
- Height: 3.700m
- Loco weight: 92 tons
- Electric system/s: 1.5kV DC
- Current pickup: 2 Type G Pantographs
- Traction motors: 4 M1 TC motors 750 V, forced ventillation
Performance figures
- Maximum speed: 105 km/h
- Power output: 2100 kW
Career
- Operators: SNCF, NS
- Withdrawn: Most in 2003, 3 units remaining in de-icing service until 2011
- Disposition: 2 preserved (8177, 8238), remainder scrapped

The SNCF BB 8100 was a French class of 1500 V DC electric locomotives, used on the Paris-Lyon "Imperial" rail line.

A post war development of the BB 300 class, they were much loved by the SNCF, 171 locomotives were built between 1948 and 1955. They were used to haul both freight and, later, passenger trains. Expansion of the 1500 V DC electrification in the 1980s allowed the locomotives to roam further than their original Paris-Lyon line. Most were withdrawn by 2003, though three locomotives were kept by SNCF Infrastructure to be hauled behind diesel locomotives, with their pantographs extended to dislodge ice build-up on the electrical wires. These final three were withdrawn from active service in 2011.

They were also exported to other countries, including the Netherlands where they were designated class 1100.

The locomotives can be seen in action in the 1950s along the Paris-Lyon line in a promotional SNCF film "De Fils en Aiguilles".
