= SNCF Class BB 20005 =

SNCF BB20005
Type and origin
- Power type: Electric
- Builder: Alsthom & MTE
- Build date: 1961 (rebuilt from BB16028)
Specifications
- Configuration
  - UIC: Bo-Bo
- Gauge: 1,435 mm (4 ft 8 1/2 in)
- Length: 16.68 m (54 ft 9 in)
- Width: 2.988 m (9 ft 9.6 in)
- Height: 4.298 m (14 ft 1.2 in)
- Loco weight: 84 short tons (75 long tons; 76 t)
- Electric system/s: Catenary; 1.5 kV DC; 25 kV AC
- Current pickup(s): Pantograph
- Traction motors: two TO-136B 1.5 kV DC traction motors
- Safety systems: Crocodile
Performance figures
- Maximum speed: 160 km/h (99 mph)
- Power output: 3,890 kW (5,220 hp) under 25 kV; 3,290 kW (4,410 hp) under 1.5 kV
Career
- Operators: SNCF
- Number in class: 1
- First run: 1961
- Disposition: reinstated to BB16028

The SNCF class BB 20005 locomotive was a prototype locomotive of the BB25150/BB25200 series, transformed from the damaged BB16028 in 1961. After the end of its test period in 1975 it was reinstated with its original equipment under its original number BB16028.

== History ==
After successful tests with BB20004, prototype of BB25500 locomotives, another new series of dual-voltage locomotives was ordered by SNCF: the BB25150 and BB25200 series. These had a higher power than their predecessors, and in order to test the new parts and technology it was decided to rebuild a BB16000 locomotive into dual-voltage.

BB20005 differed from previous prototypes in the way that it had a both complete AC and DC equipment, previous locomotives only having a complete AC equipment and a small DC equipment, limiting their power under 1.5 kV.With a full AC and DC equipment, BB20005 developed nearly 85% of its power under 1.5 kV, which was a great achievement at that time, knowing that only 2 years before BB20004 developed only 45% of its power under 1.5 kV.

The prototype helped to develop the bogies of the 2 'BB Jacquemin' series: the BB25150 series which had bogies for 130 km/h (81 mph) and were lower geared (to pull heavier freight trains) and the BB25200 series which had bogies for 160 km/h (99 mph) and were higher geared (for lighter passenger trains and to operate in push-pull mode).
