= SNCF Class BB 1500 =

SNCF locomotive class

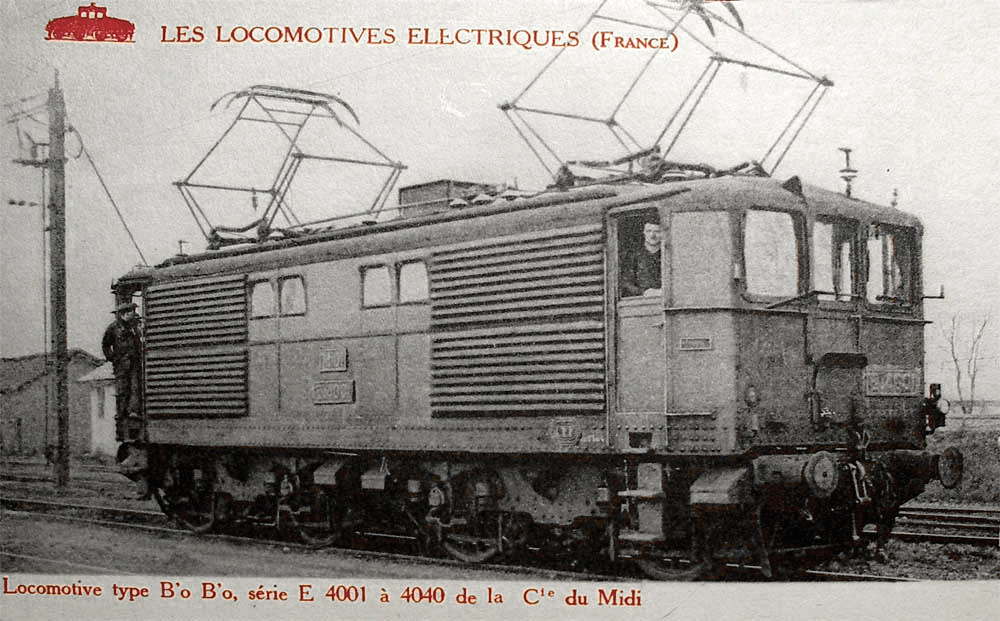
- Postcard view of E 4001 in 1928
Type and origin
- Power type: Electric
- Builder: CEF
- Build date: 1926–1928
Specifications
- Configuration
  - UIC: Bo′Bo′
- Gauge: 1,435 mm (4 ft 8 1/2 in) standard gauge
- Length: 11.85 m (38 ft 11 in)
- Loco weight: 74.2 t (73.0 long tons; 81.8 short tons)
- Power supply: 1,500 V DC
- Electric system/s: Overhead
- Current pickup(s): 2 Pantographs
- Traction motors: 4× DK 80
Performance figures
- Maximum speed: 60 km/h (37 mph)
Career
- Operators: Chemin de fer du Midi; SNCF
- Number in class: 40
- Numbers: E 4001–4040, Midi; BB 4001–4040, SNCF; BB 1501–1540, SNCF
- Nicknames: BB Midi
- Withdrawn: By 1979

BB 1500 were a series of forty electric locomotives from the Chemins de fer du Midi, operating under direct current at a voltage of 1.5 kV.

The locomotives of this first generation of BB Midi were delivered between 1926 and 1928 and were intended for hauling freight trains. Between the end of the Second World War and the 1950s, though robust, their power was considered insufficient and their reliability too poor for main line work. As a consequence they were reclassified as shunting locomotives and were active in around fifteen SNCF depots. The class was withdrawn from 1970 to 1979.

== Genesis of the series ==
The Chemins de fer du Midi began electrifying its network in 1912 with alternating current at a voltage of 12 kV and a frequency of 16 ²/₃ Hz. To comply with the ministerial decision of 1920, it continued electrification, but with current DC at a voltage of 1.5 kV. To ensure train traction, it orders two groups of locomotives: on the one hand the E 3100 and E 4800 for the fast passenger trains and on the other hand the BB for freight and other passenger services.

The BB Midi were inspired by the locomotives put into service in 1915 on the British LNER and used the same electrical equipment manufactured by Dick Kerr. A first tranche consisting of 50 locomotives, without prior prototypes, was delivered in 1923: E 4001 to 4020 and E 4501 to 4530, these would become the Class BB 1600.

As demand increased, a second tranche was delivered from 1926. It was made up of 40 locomotives geared more particularly for freight traffic. They took the numbers E 4001 to 4040 while the previous E 4001 to 4020 were renumbered in the E 4500 series and adapted to haul passenger trains. The locomotives of this second tranche became the BB 4000 class then the BB 1500 class.

== Description ==
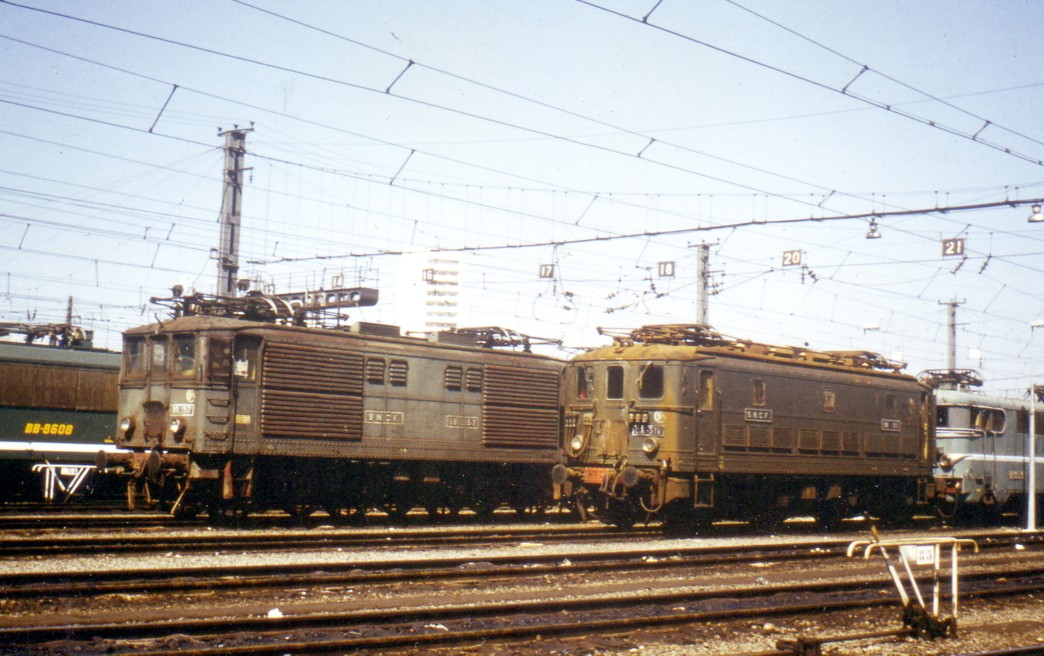
BB 1517 (in the background) at Toulouse in 1980

The locomotives of this series are equipped with the same chassis, the same engines and the same bogies on which the couplers and buffers are fixed as the previous ones; their body is also made up of riveted profiled panels. Their length,11.850 metres (38 ft 10.5 in) is identical but their weight, 74.2 tonnes (73.0 long tons; 81.8 short tons) is a little lower due to different electrical equipment. For this same reason, their continuous power, 709 kW (951 hp) is slightly lower. Their four motors (two per bogie) drive, via bilateral transmissions, spoked wheels with a diameter of 1.4 m (4 ft 7 in). They are like the previous ones built in the Constructions Électriques de France factory in Tarbes.

They have transmissions with a gear ratio of 76:15 which limits their speed to 60 km/h (37 mph) but which is adapted to working freight trains. They are equipped with rheostatic braking because the regenerative braking of the BB 1600 sometimes proved insufficient but cannot operate in multiple units - they do, however, have front intercirculation doors - and are not equipped for electric heating of passenger trains. Externally, they are distinguished from the other BB Midi by the presence of large ventilation louvers with horizontal blades which occupy the entire height of the body - this arrangement is imposed by the need to evacuate the heat produced during rheostatic braking - and which are separated by four small bays, also glazed or fitted with shutters.

== Career ==
Then E 4000 class constituted, with the E 4500, the first generation of BB Midi and were allocated, as soon as they were put into service, to the Tarbes depot. After a period of running-in and development they were then allocated to other depots. After the creation of SNCF in 1938, these locomotives, then numbered BB 4000, only hauled light freight trains, due to their poor riding and their high maintenance costs.

Several of them were damaged during World War II but were repaired. In 1947, they were restricted to shunting in stations and marshalling yards. Each locomotive was overhauled, which immobilized them for between 2 and 10 months. The modifications included rewiring, removal of unnecessary equipment, installation of skylights to improve ventilation, modification of the driving console, and suitable couplings, the work being carried out at the Béziers workshops. Their role then consists of replacing steam locomotives in depots where electrification allowed it. Some of them left the Tarbes depot for those in Angoulême, Béziers, Narbonne, Limoges or Tours-Saint-Pierre. Their renumbering to BB 1501 to 1540 took place from 1950.

From then on, the BB 1500s were exclusively assigned to shunting in the south-west regions (Angoulême, Bayonne, Béziers, Bordeaux, Brive, Coutras, Limoges, Narbonne, Paris-Sud-Ouest, Tarbes, Toulouse, Tours-Saint-Pierre and Vierzon) and Mediterranean (Avignon, Lyon-Mouche, Marseille-Blancarde and Portes-lès-Valence), the allocations varying over the years.

The first withdrawals took place in December 1970, with 1526 from Tours-Saint-Pierre then in May 1971, with 1512 from Paris-Sud-Ouest, the latter serving as a spare parts store for the Béziers workshops. By 1976, the class was reduced by half. The class disappeared in 1979, BB 1536 being withdrawn from service at the beginning of February and written off in December. Although they did not demonstrate exemplary reliability, the BB 1500s were extremely robust locomotives, some of them retaining the same bodies, motors and bogies from their entry into service until their retirement.

== Preservation ==
No BB 1500 is saved as such. BB 1632, preserved at the Cité du train in Mulhouse in pale grey livery and under its probable original number Midi E 4002, is in fact made up of BB 1501, in better general condition (body, bogies, front faces and roof), on which the side panels of BB 1632 are attached; its electrical equipment is incomplete.

== Bibliography ==
- Collardey, Bernard (31 August 1980a). "Crépuscule des vétérans : BB Midi (partie 1)". La Vie du rail (in French). No. 1756. pp. 8–14.
- Collardey, Bernard (21 September 1980b). "Crépuscule des vétérans : BB Midi (partie 2)". La Vie du rail (in French). No. 1759. pp. 8–11.
- Defrance, Jacques (1969). Le matériel moteur de la SNCF (in French) (1978 ed.). N.M. La Vie du Rail.
- Didelot, Dominique (March–April 2021). "Portrait du rail : BB 1600, 1500, 4600 MV, 4200 MV, 4700 MV, les boîtes à ozone font de la manœuvre". Ferrovissime (in French). No. 110. pp. 30–51.
- Dupuy, Jean-Michel (2007). "Les BB Midi". Le Train (in French). No. 52..
- Prévot, Aurélien (June 2009). "Le Midi passe aux grandes manœuvres : BB 1500 et 1600". Ferrovissime (in French). No. 17. pp. 2–12.
