= SNCF Class X 2200 =

Class of 60 French diesel railcars

SNCF X 2200
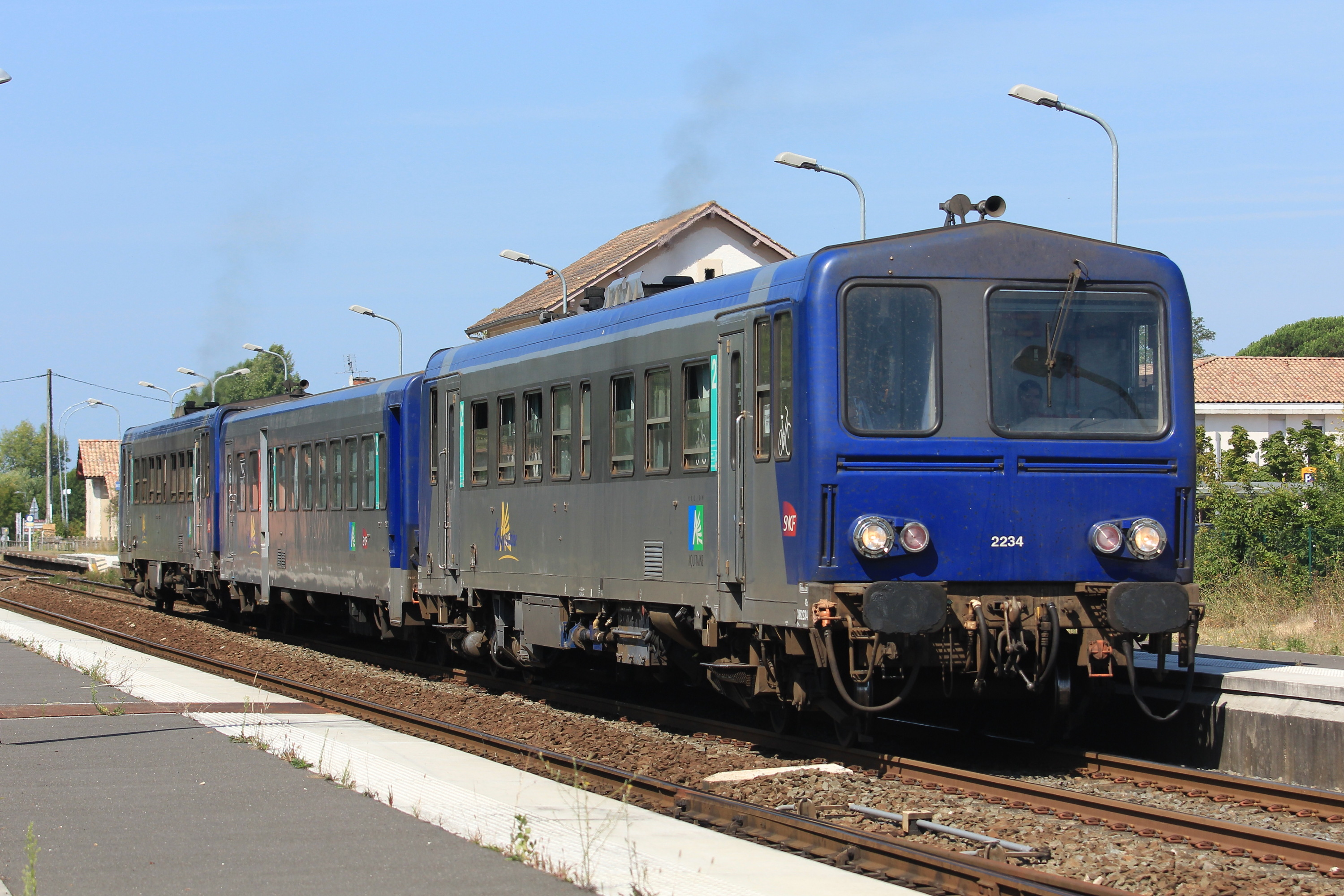
- X 2234, an XR 6000 and another X 2200 at the Saint-André-de-Cubzac station with TER 865122 (Bordeaux-Saint-Jean – Saint-Mariens – Saint-Yzan) train.
- Manufacturer: ANF
- Entered service: 1985–1988
- Number built: 60
- Number in service: 4 (21/07/2016)
- Formation: Single railcar
- Fleet numbers: X 2201–2257 and; X 92201–92203
- Capacity: Original: 8 first, 42 second; Modified: 8 first, 32 second, 1 PMR
- Operators: SNCF/TER

Specifications
- Car length: 22.4 m (73 ft 5 7/8 in)
- Width: 2.87 m (9 ft 5 in)
- Height: 3.81 m (12 ft 6 in)
- Doors: Four
- Wheel diameter: 840 mm (2 ft 9 1/8 in)
- Wheelbase: 15.400 m (50 ft 6 1/4 in)
- Maximum speed: 140 km/h (87 mph)
- Weight: 43 tonnes (42 long tons; 47 short tons)
- Prime mover(s): Original: Saurer S1 DHR 6-cylinder inline; Replacement:MAN
- Engine type: Turbocharged diesel
- Power output: 412 kW (553 hp)
- Transmission: Hydraulic: Voith T 320 R
- Bogies: Y 235
- Track gauge: 1,435 mm (4 ft 8 1/2 in)

The SNCF Class X 2200 diesel multiple units were built by ANF between 1985–1988.

Limoges units are used in Limousin, the Dordogne, around Bourdeaux and the line between Limoges and Angoulême, often with trailers. Nice based units are used mainly on the Nice - Cuneo line.
