= SNCF Class BB 60031 =

PLM 4.DMD SNCF 040.DD SNCF 60030-series
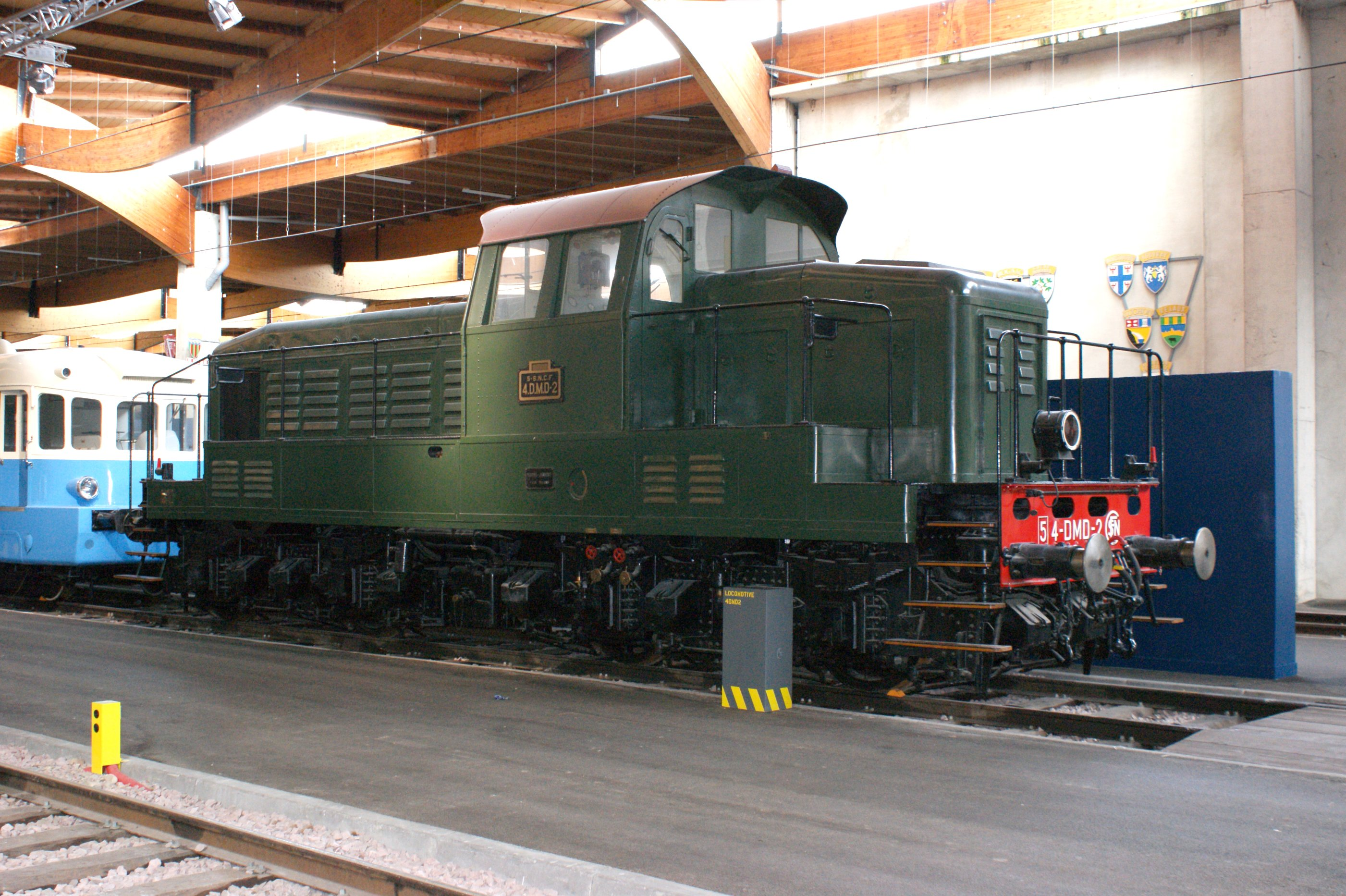
- PLM "4.DMD" prototype No. 4-DMD-2 (SNCF No.BB 60032) built 1938, at the Cité du Train museum, Mulhouse, March 2009
Type and origin
- Power type: Diesel-electric
- Builder: FAMH (mechanical); Jeumont (electrical)
- Build date: 1938
- Total produced: 3
Specifications
- Configuration
  - UIC: Bo′Bo′
- Gauge: 1,435 mm (4 ft 8 1/2 in)
- Wheel diameter: 1,120 mm (3 ft 8 in)
- Wheelbase
  - Engine: 6.000 m (19 ft 8.2 in)
  - Bogie: 2.500 m (8 ft 2.4 in)
- Length: 12.200 m (40 ft 0.3 in)
- Width: 3.000 m (9 ft 10.1 in)
- Height: 4.150 m (13 ft 7.4 in)
- Loco weight: 68.5 tonnes (67.4 long tons; 75.5 short tons)
- Prime mover: Sulzer 6LDA25
- Aspiration: Rateau turbocharger
- Displacement: 94 litre
- Alternator: 355V 353kW
- Traction motors: Jeumont TC 118, 4 off
- Cylinders: 6
- Cylinder size: 250 by 320 millimetres (9.83 in × 12.6 in)
Performance figures
- Maximum speed: 50 km/h (31 mph)
- Power output: 550 CV (400 kW; 540 hp)
Career
- Operators: PLM; SNCF
- Class: PLM: 4.DMD; SNCF: 040.DD, later 60030
- Withdrawn: 1969–1973
- Preserved: One: 4.DMD.2

The SNCF Class BB 60030 diesel locomotives were built by FAMH / Jeumont for the Chemin de Fer Paris-Lyon-Méditerranée (PLM) in 1938. They were powered by Sulzer engines, producing 550 bhp, and weighed 68.5 tonnes.

Three locomotives were built. They were initially given their PLM numbers – 4.DMD.1 to 4.DMD.3, but were soon renumbered into the SNCF numbering system as 040.DD. to 040.DD.3. In 1962, they were renumbered again as BB 60031 to 60033.

== Numbering ==
Number			Built	Withdrawn	Status
1938	1939	1962	Built	Withdrawn	Status
4.DMD.1	040.DD.1	BB 60031	1938	1970	Scrapped
4.DMD.2	040.DD.2	BB 60032	1938	1971	Preserved at Cité du Train
4.DMD.3	040.DD.3	BB 60033	1938	1969	Scrapped

Key:
Preserved
Scrapped

== Preservation ==
One locomotive, BB 60032, survives in preservation at the French National Railway Museum in Mulhouse.
