= SNCF Class X 97150 =

Class of French diesel multiple unit railbusses

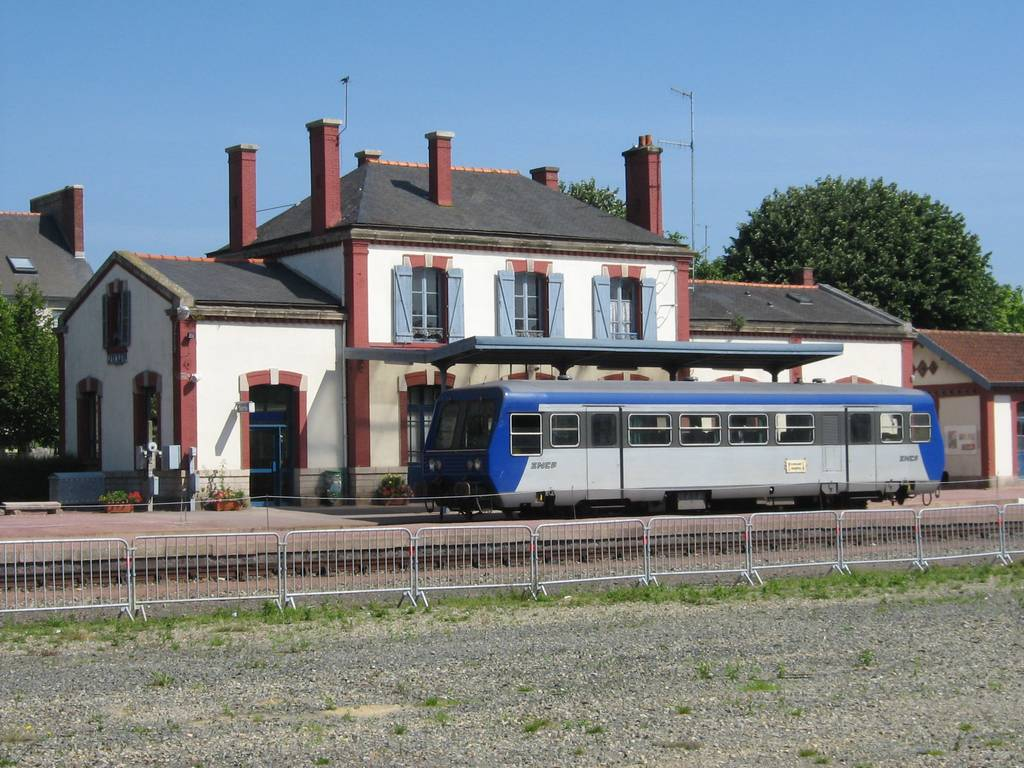
X 97150 railbus at Paimpol

SNCF Class X 97150 railbusses, also known as type A2E (Autorails à 2 essieux), were built by Soulé in 1990. Three units, numbered X 97151-153 were built to work the Guingamp to Carhaix and Paimpol lines in Brittany.

Rails et Traction International, based in Raeren, Belgium have taken ownership of them and are making them available to open access rail operators.
