= SNCF Class BB 325 =

Class of French electric locomotives

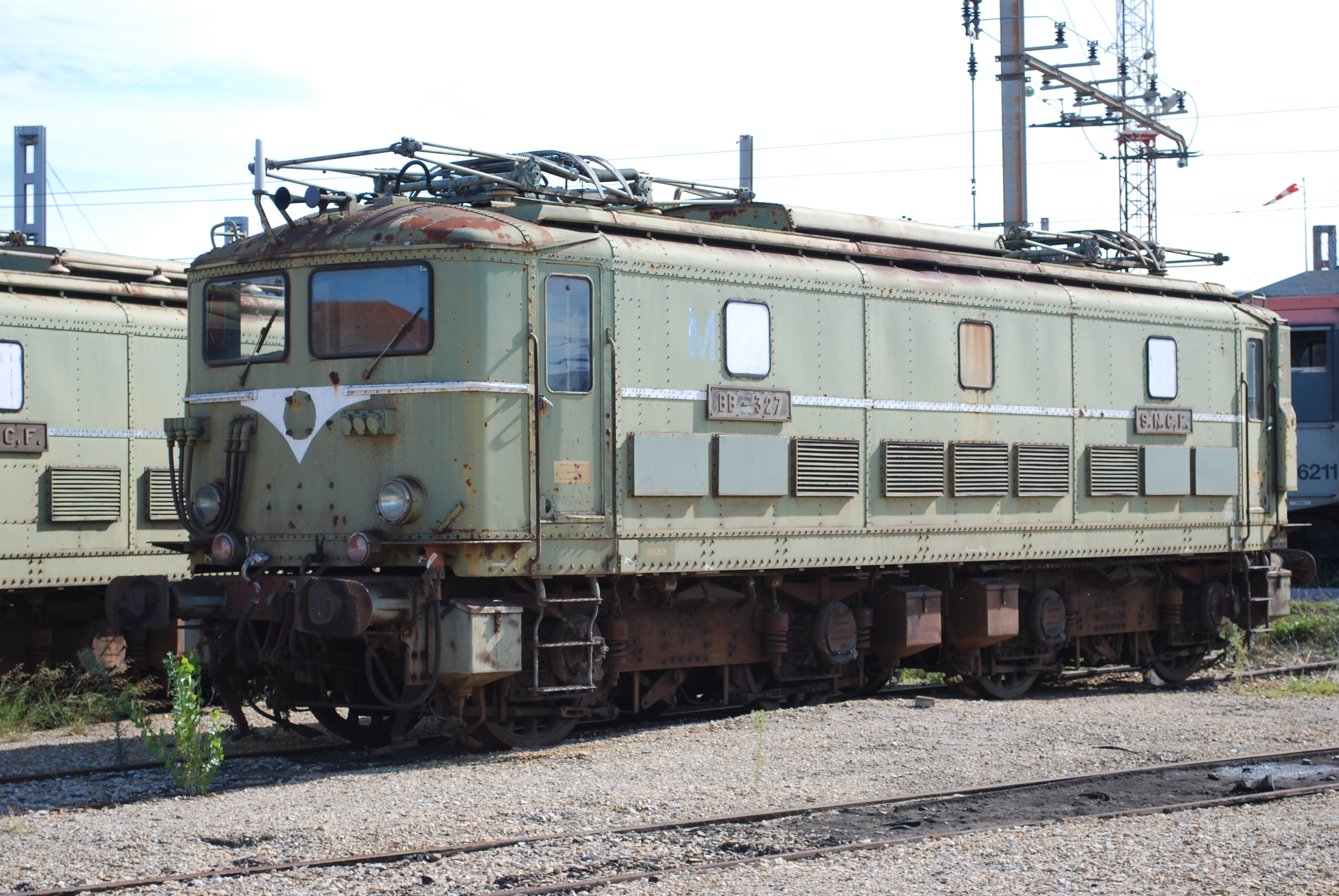
- BB 327 at Miramas in 2010
Type and origin
- Power type: Electric
- Builder: Siemens/Alsthom/Schneider/Jeumont
- Build date: 1946–1948
- Total produced: 30
Specifications
- Configuration
  - UIC: B′B′
  - Commonwealth: Bo-Bo
- Gauge: 1,435 mm (4 ft 8 1/2 in)
- Wheel diameter: 1,350 mm (53 in)
- Length
  - Over body: 12.930 m (42 ft 5.1 in)
- Loco weight: 80 t (79 long tons; 88 short tons)
- Electric system/s: 1500 V dc
- Current pickup: Pantograph
Performance figures
- Maximum speed: 105 km/h (65 mph) as built; 75 km/h (47 mph) rebuilt
- Power output
  - Continuous: 1,240 kW (1,660 hp) as built; 1,060 kW (1,420 hp) rebuilt
Career
- Operators: SNCF
- Class: BB 325
- Number in class: 25
- Numbers: 0325–0355; BB 325–BB 355
- Retired: 1997

The SNCF Class BB 325 was a class of 25 electric locomotives built between 1946 and 1948. The class was a development of the pre-war Midi Class E4700 and very similar to the Class BB 300. As delivered they were numbered 0325–0355. Under the 1950 renumbering scheme they became BB 325–BB 355.

In 1967 the cab end doors were removed. Between 1977 and 1987, the class was rebuilt as shunters with the top speed reduced to 75 km/h (47 mph). The class was withdrawn in 1997.

== Preservation ==
3 members of the class have been preserved:

- BB 327 at Site du Train, Nîmes
- BB 346 at Site du Train, Nîmes
- BB 348 at Mohon, an annexe of Cité du train, Mulhouse.
