= SNCF Class X 2100 =

SNCF X 2100
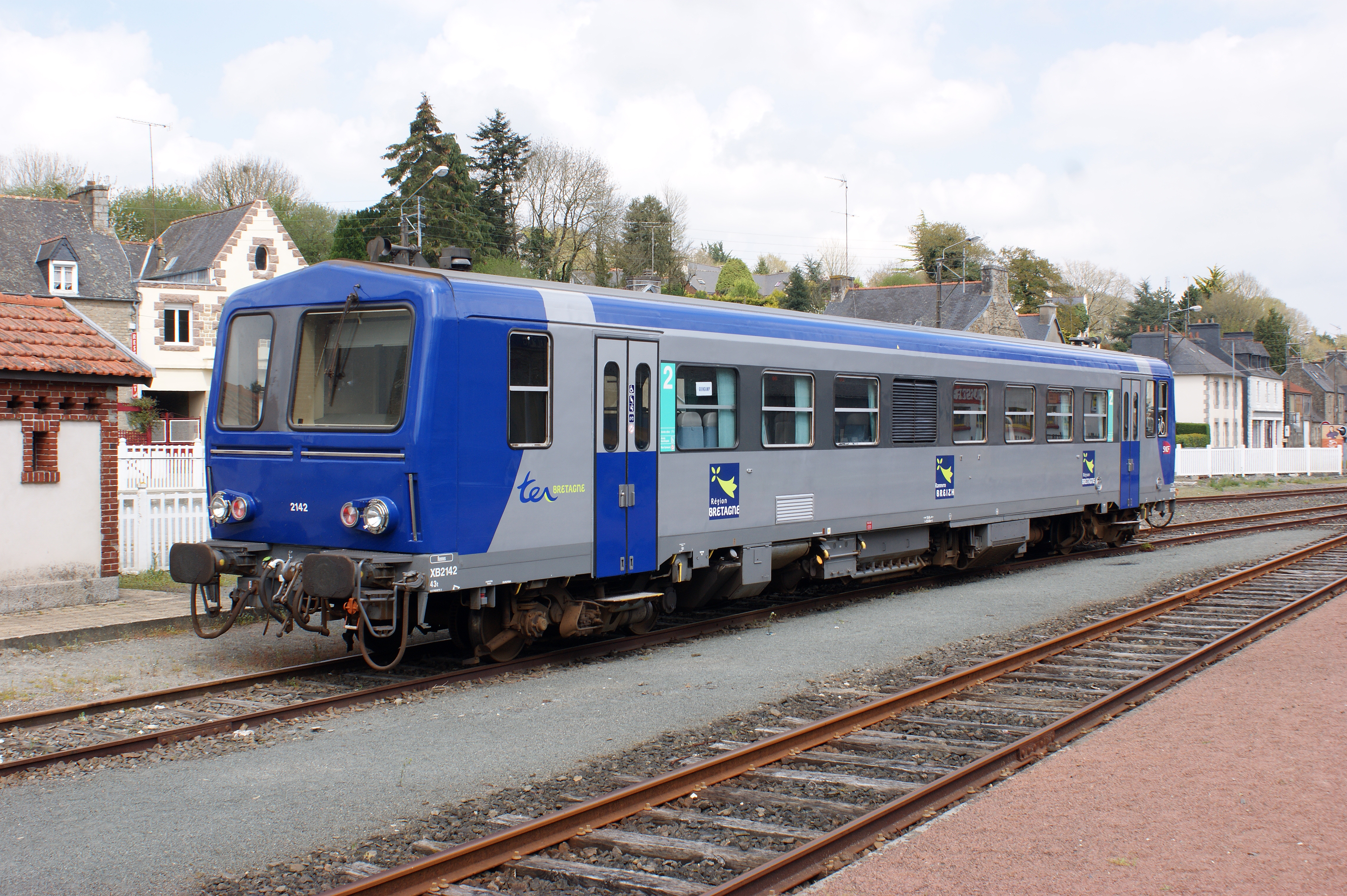
- XB 2142 in the colours of TER Bretagne, at the Callac station, 16 April 2011

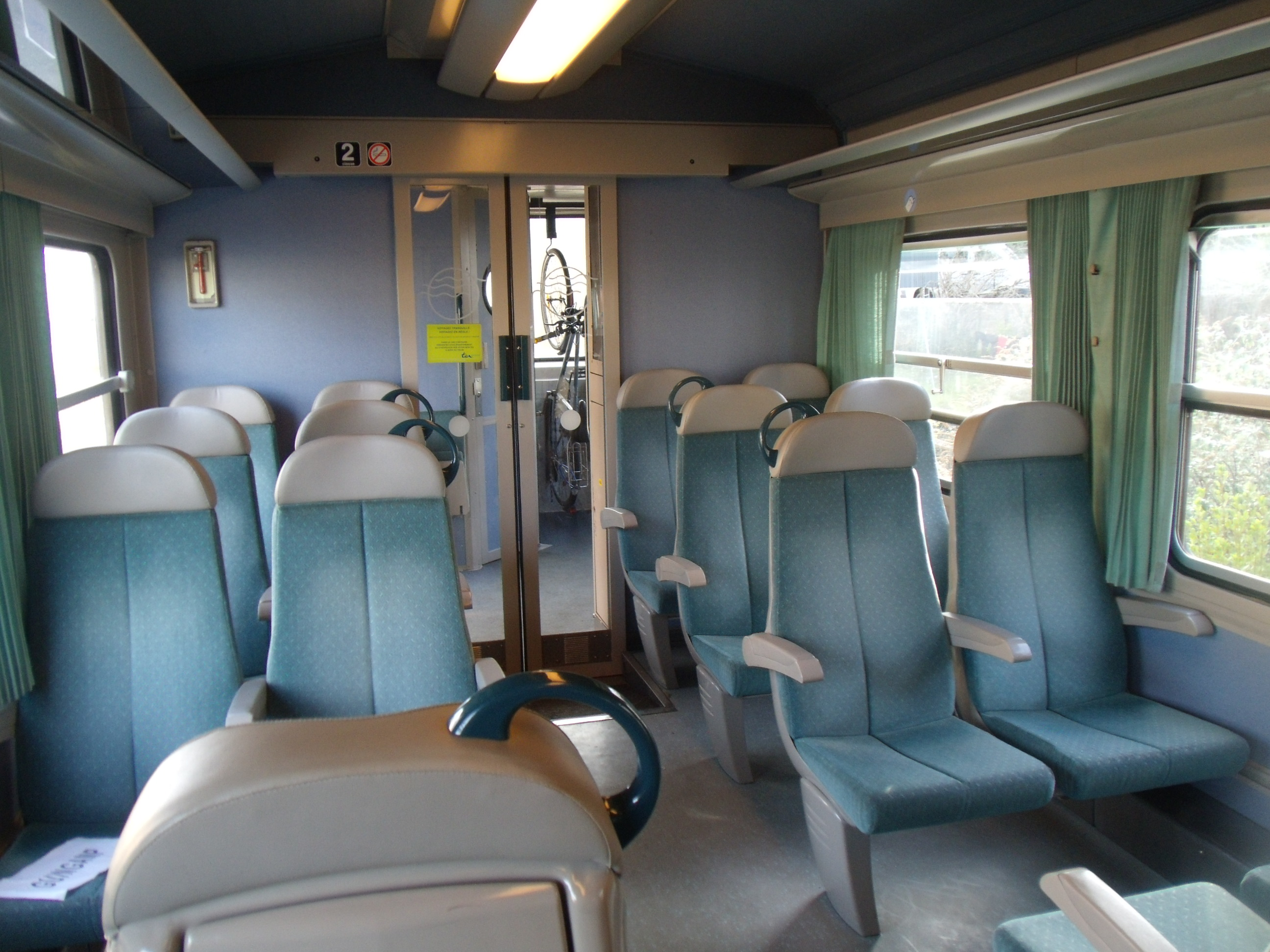
- Interior of the refurbished X 2111
- In service: 1980 - 2018
- Manufacturer: ANF
- Constructed: 1980–1983
- Number built: 53
- Design code: UIC: XABD
- Fleet numbers: 2101–2132, 2134–2150, 92101–92104 (2133 renumbered 92104)
- Operators: SNCF/TER

Specifications
- Car length: 22.400 m (73 ft 5 7/8 in)
- Width: 2.870 m (9 ft 5 in)
- Height: 3.810 m (12 ft 6 in)
- Wheel diameter: 840 mm (2 ft 9 1/8 in)
- Wheelbase: 15.400 m (50 ft 6 1/4 in)
- Maximum speed: 140 km/h (87 mph)
- Weight: 43.7 tonnes (43.0 long tons; 48.2 short tons)
- Prime mover(s): Original: Saurer S1 DHR; Refurb.: MAN 2842 LE 604
- Engine type: Diesel
- Power output: Original: 440 kW (590 hp) at 1550 rpm; Refurb.: 478 kW (641 hp)
- Transmission: hydraulic: Voith 420 R
- Track gauge: 1,435 mm (4 ft 8 1/2 in) standard gauge

The SNCF X 2100 class of diesel multiple units were built by ANF between 1980–1983. They were used on TER Services, mostly in Brittany, Loire and around Limoges, France.

Two X 2100 units have been preserved by the Chemin de Fer Touristique Sud Touraine.
