= SNCF 232.U.1 =

Prototype French 4-6-4 locomotive

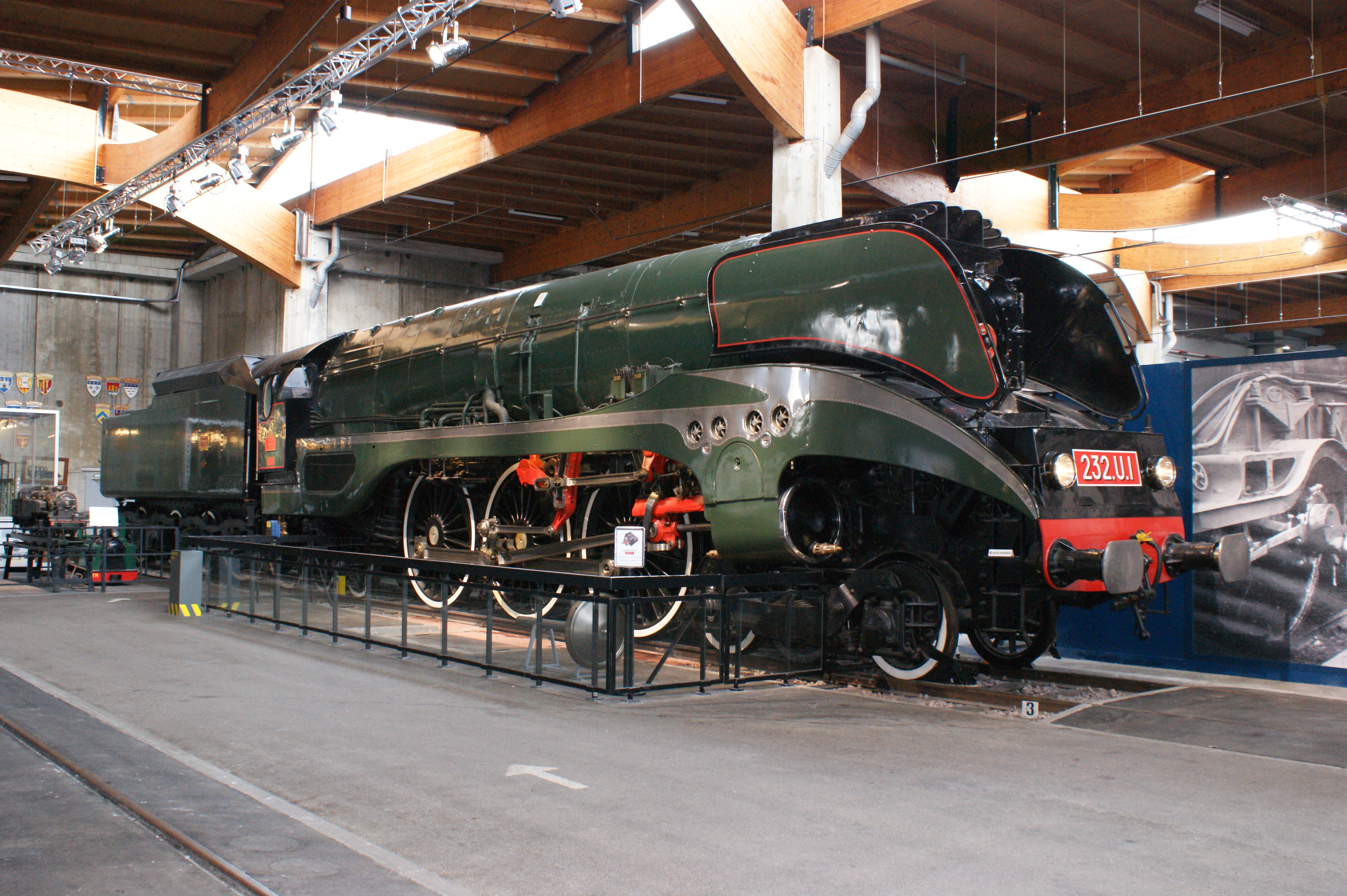
- SNCF 232.U.1 in the Cité du Train museum in 2009
Type and origin
- Power type: Steam
- Builder: Société Alsacienne de Constructions Mécaniques (start); Corpet-Louvet (finish)
- Serial number: C-L: 1908
- Build date: May 1949
- Total produced: 1
Specifications
- Gauge: 1,435 mm (4 ft 8 1/2 in)
- Leading dia.: 970 mm (3 ft 2 1/4 in)
- Driver dia.: 2,000 mm (6 ft 6 3/4 in)
- Trailing dia.: 970 mm (3 ft 2 1/4 in)
- Length: Loco: 15,705 mm (51 ft 6 1/4 in); Loco+tender: 25.63 m (84 ft 1 in)
- Adhesive weight: 69 tonnes (68 long tons; 76 short tons)
- Loco weight: 129 tonnes (127 long tons; 142 short tons)
- Tender weight: 84.4 tonnes (83.1 long tons; 93.0 short tons)
- Total weight: 215.4 tonnes (212.0 long tons; 237.4 short tons)
- Tender type: SNCF 36.B
- Fuel type: Coal
- Fuel capacity: 11.5 tonnes (11.3 long tons; 12.7 short tons)
- Water cap.: 36,000 litres (7,900 imp gal; 9,500 US gal)
- Firebox
  - Grate area: 5.175 m^{2} (55.70 sq ft)
- Boiler pressure: 20 kg/cm^{2} (1.96 MPa; 284 psi)
- Heating surface: 195.0 m^{2} (2,099 sq ft)
- Superheater
  - Type: Houlet, 33-element
  - Heating area: 87.4 m^{2} (941 sq ft)
- Cylinders: Four (compound)
- High-pressure cylinder: 446 mm × 700 mm (17 1/2 in × 27 1/2 in)
- Low-pressure cylinder: 680 mm × 700 mm (26 3/4 in × 27 1/2 in)
Performance figures
- Maximum speed: 140 km/h (87 mph)
- Power output: 2,430 kW (3,260 hp)
Career
- Operators: SNCF
- Class: 232.U
- Nicknames: La Divine (Divine)
- Delivered: May 1949
- Retired: October 1961
- Restored: 1973–1976
- Current owner: Cité du Train
- Disposition: Museum display

SNCF 232.U.1 is a French steam locomotive of the Hudson type.

It was built as part of a new locomotive program designed for the Chemins de fer du Nord that was delayed by the outbreak of the Second World War. Its particular design distinguishes it in the small series of delivered machines, which makes it a unique model. Delivered in 1949, it was retired from service in 1961. It has since been restored and is now preserved at the Cité du Train in Mulhouse, where it is fired up every 20–30 minutes in a display showing how connecting rods work to propel the locomotive.

== History ==
The locomotive was first built as part of an order with the Société Alsacienne de Constructions Mécaniques in 1935. Construction was delayed by the war and wouldn't continue until 1949 when the unit was completed by Corpet-Louvet, incorporating a number of upgrades. This particular locomotive worked the Paris-Lille mainline from 1949 to 1961.

Designed under the supervision of Marc de Caso, the locomotive incorporated the latest technology available at the time, including four sets of piston valves driven by outside mounted Walschaerts valve gear, roller bearings on the axles, simplified controls and a mechanical stoker. While highly effective, the SNCF was focusing on electrification at the time; 232.U.1 would be the only example built. It worked the Paris-Lille line with seven other locomotives from the classes 232.S and 232.R. 232.U.1 would be the last mainline steam locomotive built in France.
