= SNCF Class BB 25200 =

Class of 50 French dual-voltage electric locomotives

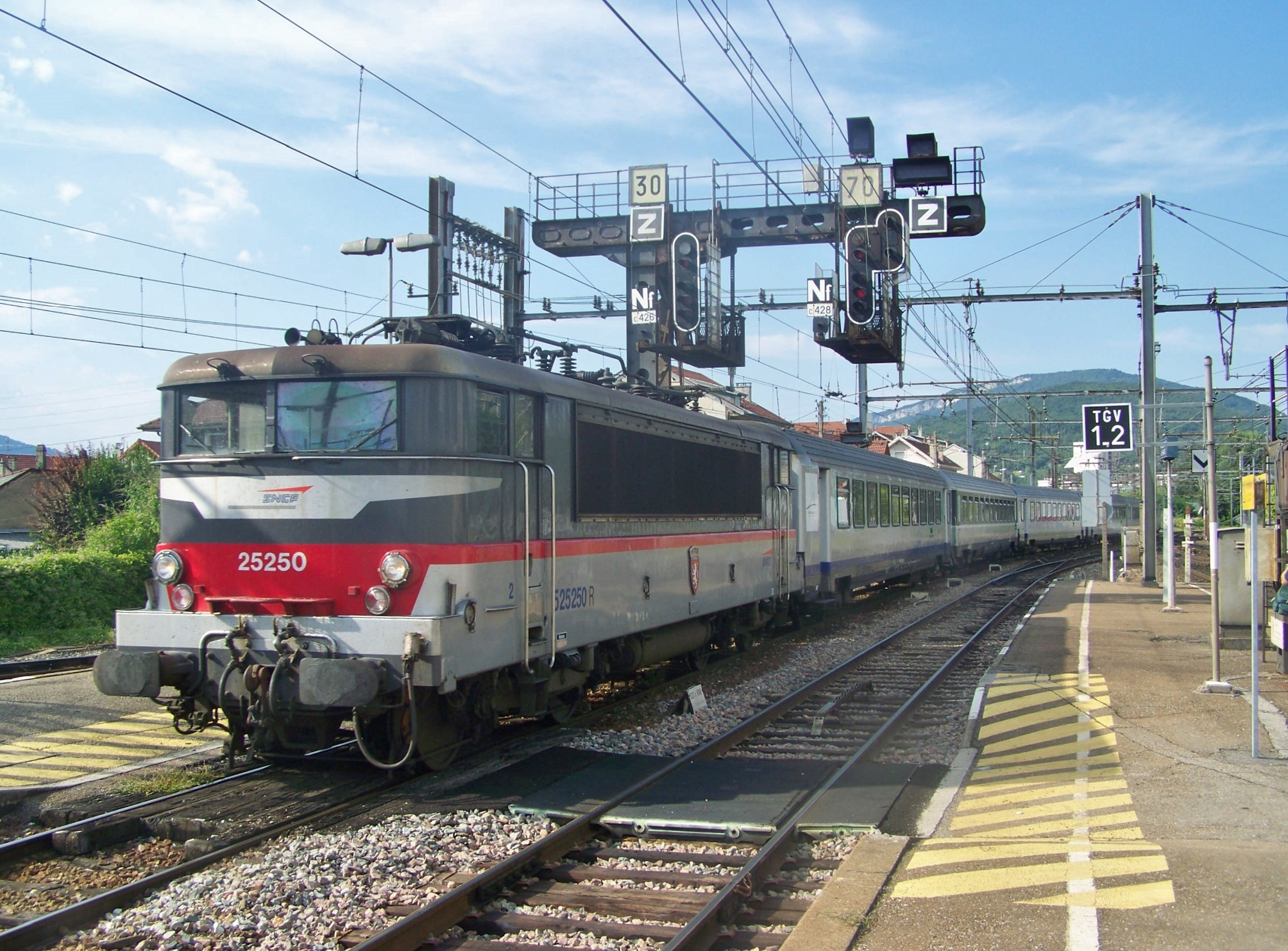
- BB25250 arriving at Aix-les-Bains
Type and origin
- Power type: Electric
- Designer: André Jacquemin
- Builder: Materiel de Traction Electrique (MTE)
- Build date: 1965–1967; 1974
Specifications
- Configuration
  - Commonwealth: Bo-Bo
- Gauge: 1,435 mm (4 ft 8 1/2 in) standard gauge
- Bogies: 2
- Length: 16.2 m (53 ft); 16.68 m (54.7 ft)
- Power supply: 1500 V DC/25 kV AC
- Electric system/s: Catenary
- Current pickup(s): Pantograph
- Traction motors: 4 x
- Loco brake: Air and Electrical regenerative
- Train brakes: Air
- Safety systems: ETCS
- Couplers: UIC standard screw coupling
Performance figures
- Maximum speed: 160 km/h (99 mph)
- Power output
  - Continuous: 3,400 kW (4,600 hp) @ 1500 V; 4,130 kW (5,540 hp) @ 25 kV
- Tractive effort: 304 kN (68,000 lb_{f})
Career
- Operators: SNCF
- Class: BB 25200
- Number in class: 50
- Numbers: BB 25201–BB 25251
- Nicknames: BB Jacquemin
- Withdrawn: 2012

The BB 25200 is a class of electric locomotives in service with the French railways SNCF, built by Materiel de Traction Electrique (MTE) between 1967 and 1976. They are dual voltage locomotives working off both 1500 V DC and 25 kV 50 Hz AC. Designed by André Jacquemin, the class is a development of the earlier BB 25100 and BB 25150 locomotives with a higher top speed, being capable of 160 km/h (99 mph). It is the dual voltage equivalent of the BB 9200 and BB 16000 classes.

== Construction ==
The initial batch of 45 locomotives, numbers BB 25201–BB 25246, was built between 1965 and 1967. Subsequently, a further 5, numbers BB 25247–BB 25251, were built in 1975. In addition 4 Class BB 25150, numbers BB 25180, BB 25184, BB 25194 and BB 25195, were converted in 2003.

== Service use ==
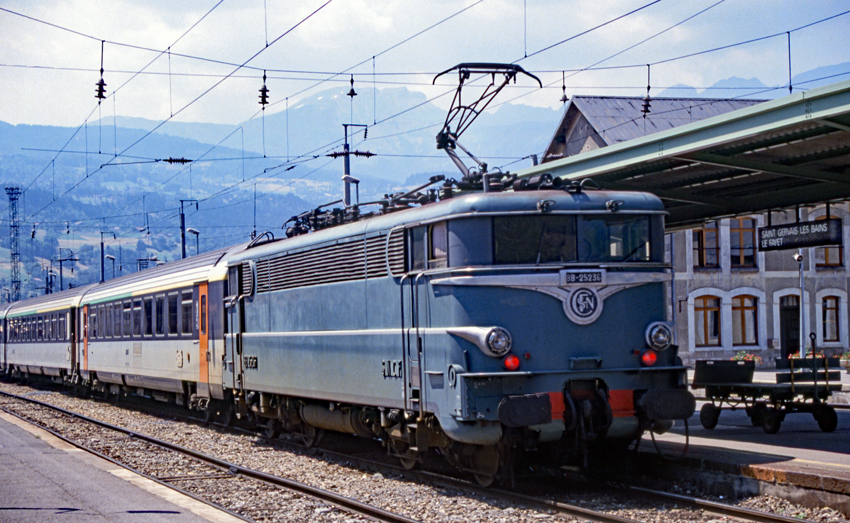
BB 25236 in blue propelling a push-pull set out of St Gervais les Bains

They were first used on passenger services from Paris to Le Mans and Rennes until replaced by Class BB 22200 locomotives. After that they were redeployed to other services from Paris, mainly to Le Havre.

In 1987, 18 members of the class, BB 25201, BB 25202 and BB 25236–BB 25251, were converted to push-pull operation and redesignated as Class BB 25200R. They were allocated to Chambéry for services between Grenoble and Lyon. In addition they worked services out of Paris to Beauvais, Le Mans and Rennes. The class had all been withdrawn by 2012.

== Names ==
Four members of the class received names.

Number	Name	Number	Name
BB 25201	Le Mans	BB 25250	Vitré
BB 25247	Combourg	BB 25251	Versailles
