= TCDD 56701 Class =

The TCDD (Turkish Republic Railways) 56701 Class was a class of 2-10-0 steam locomotives.

In 1954 TCCD bought 48 SNCF Class 150.X locomotives which had been made redundant by electrification. These had been built between 1944 and 1946 by various French makers (Batignolles-Châtillon, Fives-Lille, SFCM and Schneider et Cie., to the DRG Class 44 Übergangskriegslokomotive (transitional war locomotive) design, both under German occupation and in the immediate period after Allied liberation.

They were kept in TCCD service until the late 1970s.

== See also ==
DRG Class 44
