= Constructions électriques de France =

The Constructions électriques de France (CEF) was a former French company specializing in the construction of electric locomotives and rolling stock for trams. The company was founded on 7 March 1920. It later acquired the license for the construction of electrical devices from the English company Dick Kerr.

== History ==
- June 1932: The company merged with Als-Thom. CEF built 800 electric locomotives before the merger.

== Production Sites ==
- Vénissieux: Production of tramway equipment
- Tarbes: Production of locomotives

== Production ==
The company constructed numerous series of French electric locomotives for the former railway companies:

- PLM: The 1CC1 3700
- PO: The BB 200, BB 1420, BB 4200, BB 4600, and BB 4700.
- Midi: The BB 1500, BB 1600, and 2D2 5000.
- The Mine Burbach, Algrange: BB 18 M2, BB 18 S industrial narrow-gauge locomotives

== See also ==
- List of SNCF classes
