= SNCF Class BB 1600 =

Series of French electric locomotives

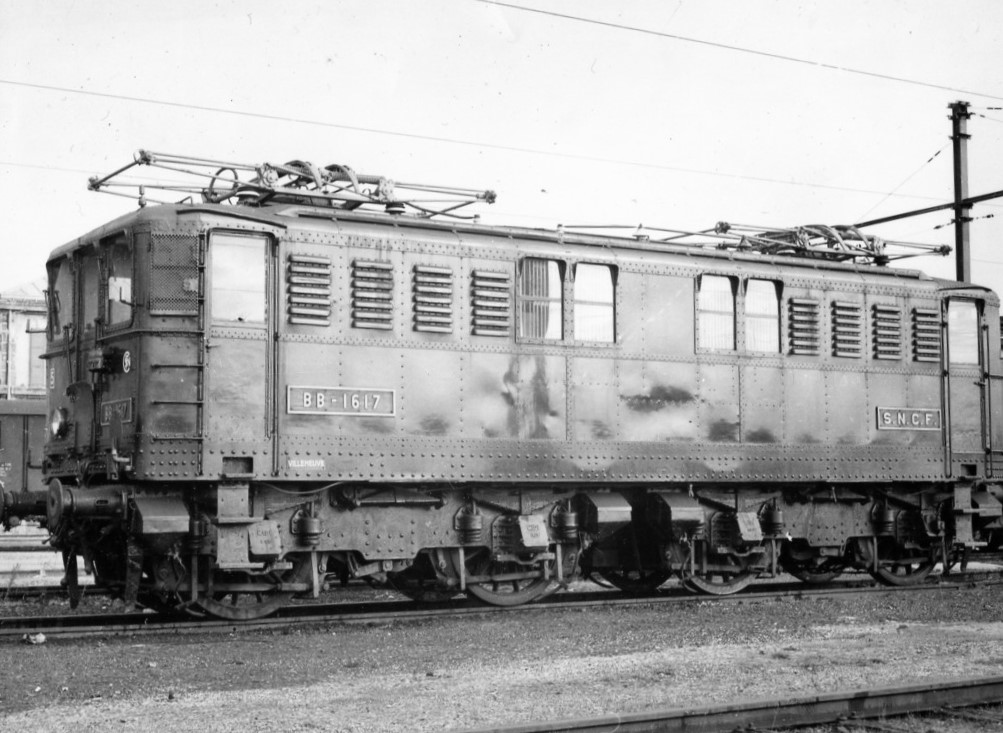
- BB 1617 at Montereau in 1954
Type and origin
- Power type: Electric
- Builder: CEF
- Build date: 1922–1926
Specifications
- Configuration
  - UIC: Bo′Bo′
- Gauge: 1,435 mm (4 ft 8 1/2 in) standard gauge
- Length: 11.85 m (38 ft 11 in)
- Loco weight: 76 t (75 long tons; 84 short tons)
- Power supply: 1,500 V DC
- Electric system/s: Overhead
- Current pickup(s): 2 Pantographs
- Traction motors: 4× DK 80
Performance figures
- Maximum speed: 60 km/h (37 mph) freight; 90 km/h (56 mph) passenger; 50 km/h (31 mph) shunting
Career
- Operators: Chemin de fer du Midi; SNCF
- Number in class: 50
- Numbers: E 4001–4050, Midi; BB 4501–4550, SNCF; BB 1601–1650, SNCF
- Nicknames: BB Midi
- Withdrawn: By 1984

The BB 1600 were a series of fifty electric locomotives from the Chemins de fer du Midi, operating under direct current at a voltage of 1.5 kV.

They constituted the first generation of BB Midi, delivered between 1923 and 1926. Numbered E 4001 to 4050 in Midi, they became Class BB 4500 at the creation of SNCF, then were reclassified as shunting locomotives under the numbers BB 1601 – 1650 in the 1950s. The last members of the class were removed from SNCF inventories in 1984.

Elements of BB 1501 and BB 1632 have been used to reconstruct a locomotive exhibited under the original Midi registration E 4002 at the Cité du Train in Mulhouse, this locomotive having hauled the inaugural train for 1.5 kV direct current electric traction in France between Pau and Lourdes on 30 October 1922.

== Genesis of the series ==
The Chemins de fer du Midi began electrifying its network in 1912 with alternating current at a voltage of 12 kV and a frequency of 16 ²/₃ Hz. To comply with the ministerial decision of 1920, it continued electrification, but with current DC at a voltage of 1.5 kV. To ensure train traction, it ordered two groups of locomotives: on the one hand the E 3100 and E 4800 for the fast passenger trains and on the other hand the BB for freight and other passenger services.

The BB Midi were inspired by the locomotives put into service in 1915 on the British LNER and used the same electrical equipment manufactured by Dick Kerr. A first tranche consisting of 50 locomotives, without prior prototypes, was delivered in 1923: E 4001 to 4020 and E 4501 to 4530, these would become the Class BB 1600s.

== Description ==
=== Main Features ===
The general architecture of the BB 1600 remained the same, with a few details and dimensional changes, for all other BB Midis.

The locomotive consists of a profiled and riveted sheet metal body, fixed to the chassis which rests on the bogies. The body is made up of two driving cabs framing a compartment where the equipment is arranged on either side of a central corridor. Its roof supports the two pantographs. The cabins have four doors; two overlook the side faces, a third provides access to the equipment compartment and the fourth, rarely used in practice, is a front intercirculation door. The bogies, with two axles and one motor per axle, have wheels with a diameter of 1.40 metres (4 ft 7 in). The buffers and couplings are fixed on the crosspieces of the bogies, and not on the body and the bogies are coupled together: as a result, the chassis and the body only partially participate in the traction force and their structure can be made lighter.

=== BB 1600 specifics ===
The locomotives measure 10.850 m (35 ft 7.2 in) long and weigh 75 tonnes (74 long tons; 83 short tons). They are equipped with four Dick Kerr DK 80 motors giving them a continuous power of 735 kW (986 hp). As they were intended for use on mountain lines with steep gradients, it was considered appropriate to equip them with regenerative braking which allows electricity to be returned to the catenary, particularly during descents, but this device is inoperative when the line voltage is too high. The machines are equipped for operation in multiple units.

In addition to these common characteristics, the two groups of locomotives differ only in their transmission, adapted to the use for which the machines were intended. E 4001 – 4020, originally intended for freight trains, had a gear train with a ratio of 5.066 and their speed was limited to 60 km/h (37 mph). However, they were quickly modified and brought to the standard of the later series. E 4501– 4530, reserved for haulage of passenger trains, had a gear train with a ratio of 3.136 which gave them a service speed of 90 km/h (56 mph).

== Service career ==
=== Main line service ===
As no prototype was built before the production machines and the electrical equipment was sometimes deficient, development was long and laborious.

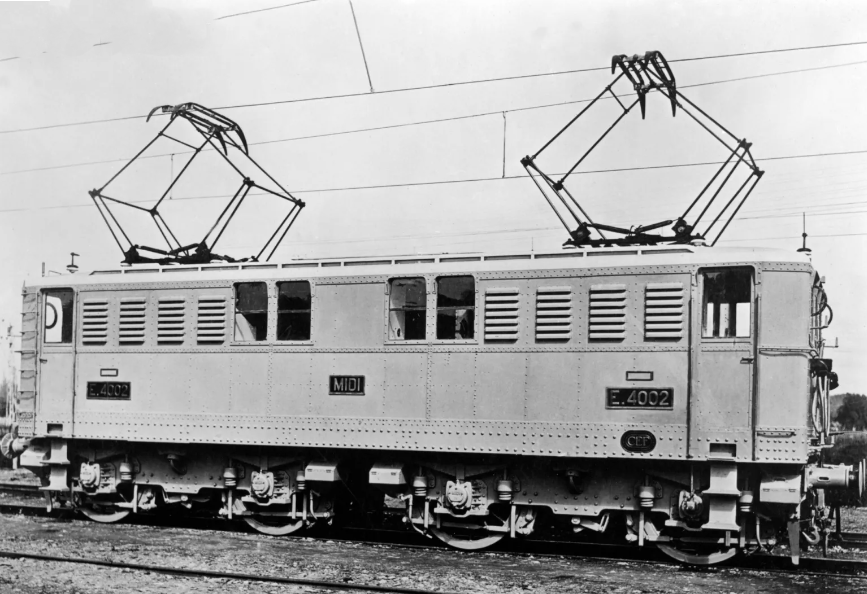
E 4002 as it left the factory

E 4002 hauled the inaugural train between Pau and Lourdes, on 30 October 1922; This was the first service use of a 1.5 kV DC locomotive in France. The machine was not yet officially delivered or even completely finished – in any case it had not yet received its final livery – but the manufacturer loaned it to the Chemins de fer du Midi for this occasion.

The E 4000s were intended, when they entered service, to haul freight trains and the E 4500s to haul passenger services. This tranche of locomotives was delivered between February 1923 (E 4002) and 1926. The Chemins de fer du Midi, noting the lack of availability of high-speed locomotives and having to cope with increasing traffic in this area, decided to modify the E 4000 to adapt them passenger trains, such as E 4501 to 4530; it also renumbered them following the previous ones, which resulted in a homogeneous series of fifty locomotives (E 4501 to 4550). They were renumbered in the BB 4500 series in 1937, during the creation of the SNCF.

=== Shunting ===
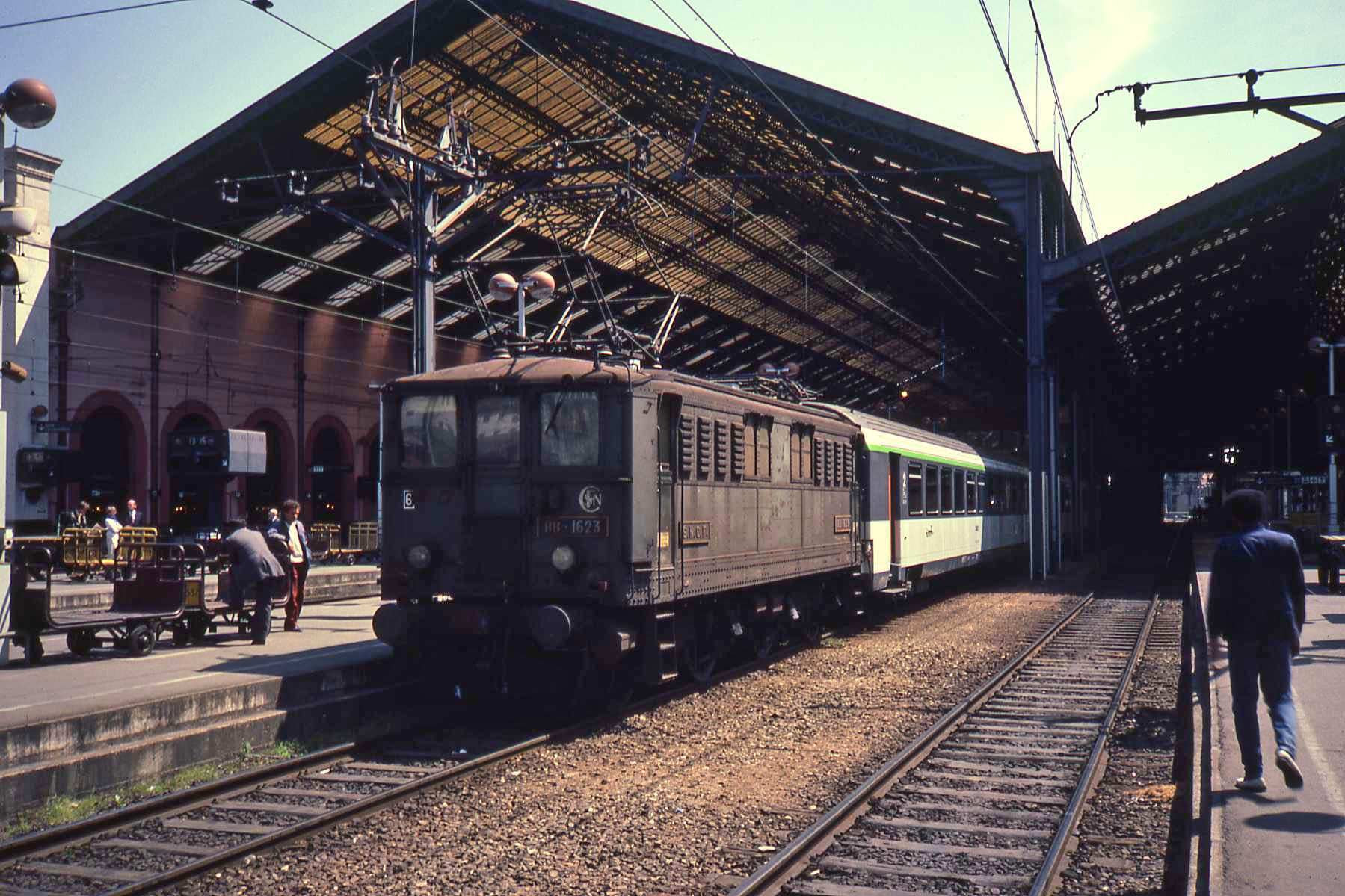
BB 1623 shunting a rake of passenger cars at Gare de Lyon-Perrache in 1984.

After the Second World War, the BB 4500s were largely outclassed by other locomotive series for line services. They were modified to operate as shunters in stations and yards and were re-registered in the BB 1600 series. The modifications, carried out between 1953 and 1957 at the Oullins workshops, concerned alterations to the gear ratio of the transmission, which reduced their speed limit to 50 km/h (31 mph); the wiring was completely redone, the electrical equipment modified or replaced and the driving console refitted. The motors, on the other hand, were not changed. From then on, with a weight increased to 76 t (75 long tons; 84 short tons), they were exclusively assigned to shunting and assembling passenger trains.

In 1962, they were present in the depots of Béziers, Juvisy, Lyon-Mouche, Montrouge, Narbonne, Paris-Lyon, Paris-Sud-Ouest, Toulouse and Villeneuve. In 1980, they were found in Avignon, Béziers, Chambéry, Dijon, Lyon-Mouche and Villeneuve. Withdrawals began in 1979 and the class disappeared from SNCF inventories in 1984. At Paris Lyon, the arrival of TGV sets in 1981 limited the number of classic trains to be shunted or reassembled; elsewhere, the BB 1600s faced competition from the more powerful BB 4200s or the more adaptable CC 1100s. In their career, BB 1650s had covered more than 2.6 million km (nearly 4,000 km per month), a modest performance after just under 56 years of activity.

== Preservation ==
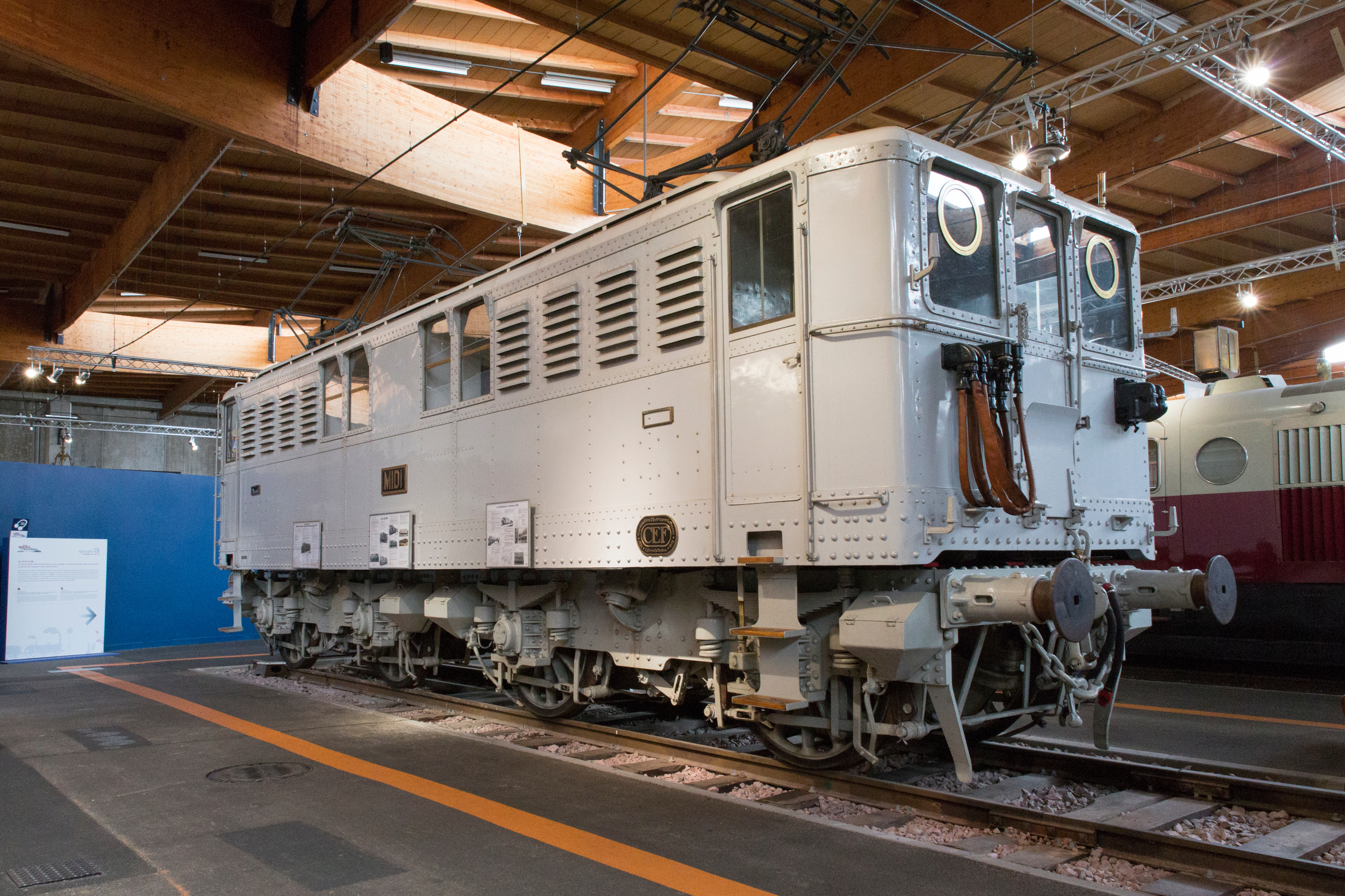
E 4002 at Cité du Train

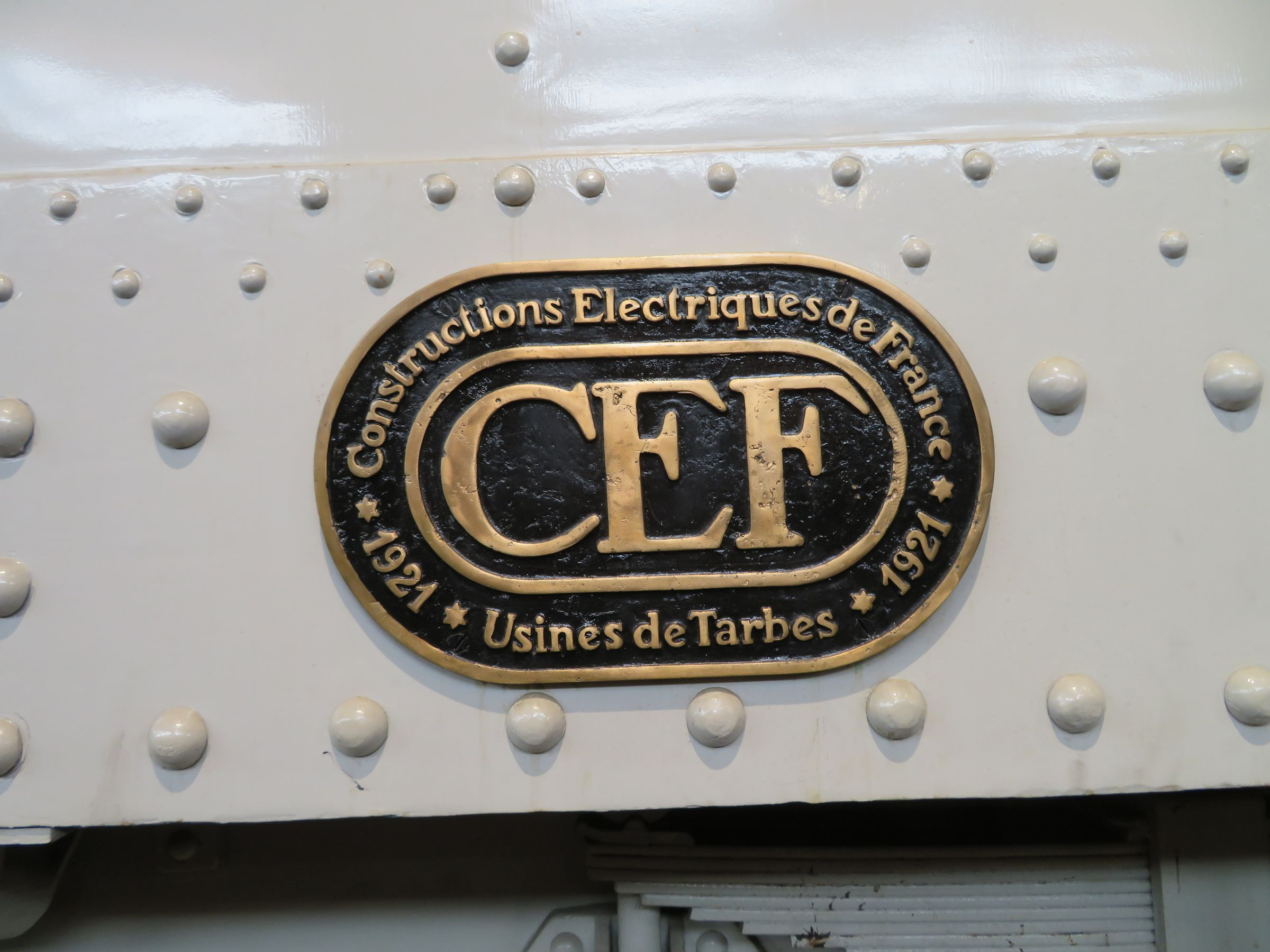
CEF makers plate on E 4002

BB 1632, preserved at the Cité du train in Mulhouse in pale grey livery and under its probable original number Midi E 4002, is in fact made up of the old BB 1501 in better general condition (body, bogies, front panels and roof), on which the side panels of BB 1632 are attached; the interior equipment is incomplete.
