= SNCF Class CC 65500 =

Class of 35 French diesel-electric locomotives

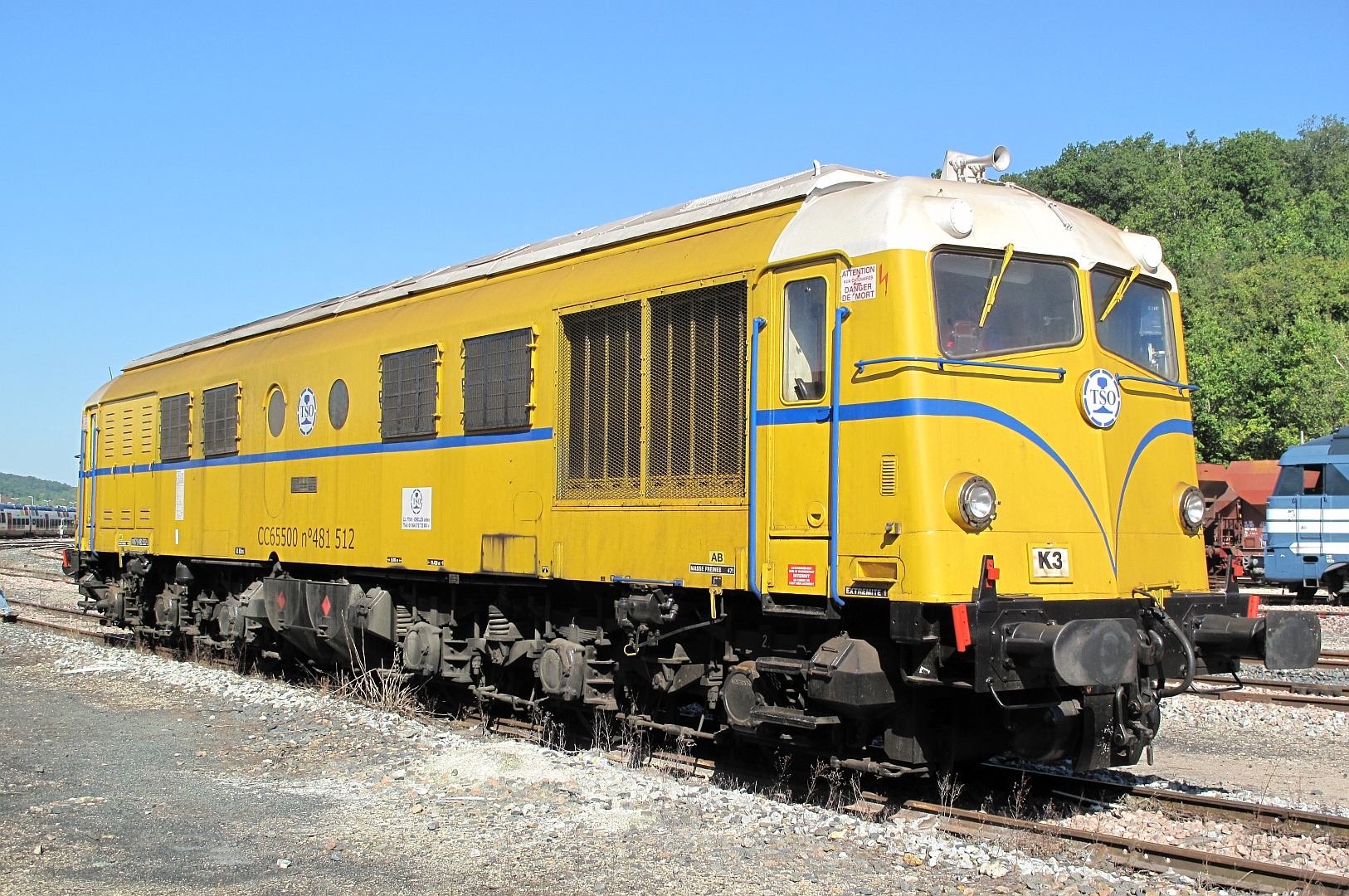
- CC 65512 at Longueville on 19 September 2010
Type and origin
- Power type: Diesel electric
- Builder: CAFL and CEM
- Build date: 1955 to 1959
Specifications
- Configuration
  - UIC: Co′Co′
- Length: 19,420 mm (63 ft 9 in)
- Loco weight: 116 tonnes (114 long tons; 128 short tons)
- Prime mover: Sulzer 12 LDA 28,
- Engine type: 12 cylinder double-bank Diesel engine
- Traction motors: Six CEM GDTM 532
- Transmission: Diesel-electric transmission
Performance figures
- Maximum speed: 80 km/h (50 mph)
- Power output: 1,290 kW (1,730 hp)
Career
- Operators: SNCF
- Number in class: 35

The SNCF Class CC 65500 diesel locomotives were built by CAFL and CEM between 1955 and 1959. They were used on heavy express railway freight in the Paris area, being commonly seen on the Grande Ceinture lines around Paris, France.

The design of the CC 65500 locomotives was inspired by American locomotives.

== Preservation ==
CC 65506 is preserved at Oignies.
