= SNCF Class BB 25100 =

Class of 25 French dual-voltage electric locomotives

Type and origin
- Power type: Electric
- Designer: André Jacquemin
- Builder: Materiel de Traction Electrique (MTE)
- Build date: 1964–1965
Specifications
- Configuration
  - UIC: Bo′Bo’
  - Commonwealth: Bo-Bo
- Gauge: 1,435 mm (4 ft 8 1/2 in)
- Bogies: 2
- Wheel diameter: 1,250 mm (49 in)
- Length: 16.2 m (53 ft)
- Loco weight: 85 t (84 long tons; 94 short tons)
- Power supply: 1500 V DC/25 kV AC
- Electric system/s: Catenary
- Current pickup(s): Pantograph
Performance figures
- Maximum speed: 130 km/h (81 mph)
- Power output
  - 1 hour: 3,400 kW (4,600 hp) @ 1500 V; 4,130 kW (5,540 hp) @ 25kV
- Tractive effort: 367 kN (83,000 lb_{f})
Career
- Operators: SNCF
- Class: BB 25100
- Number in class: 25
- Numbers: BB 25101 – BB 25125
- Nicknames: BB Jacquemin
- Withdrawn: 2006

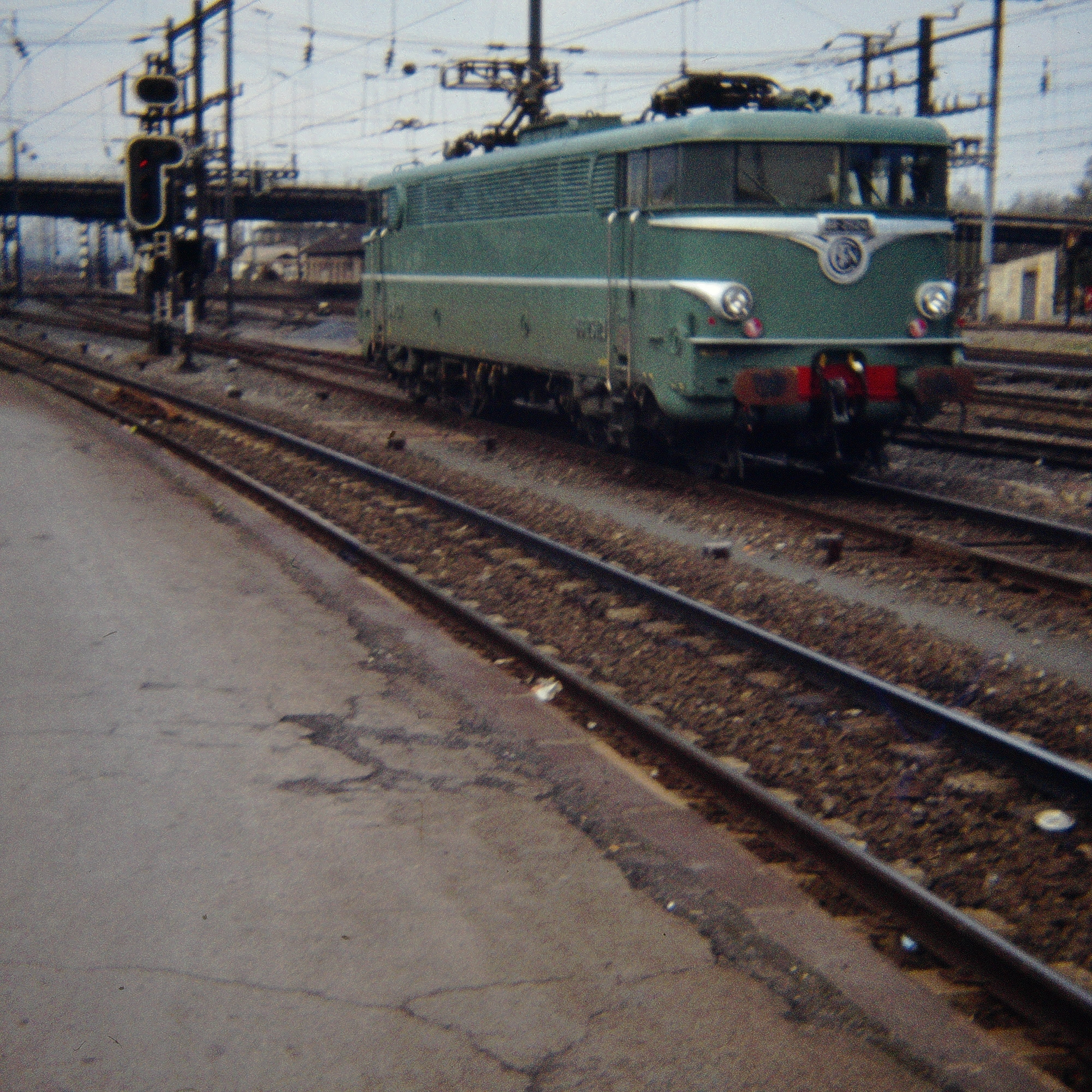
BB 25100 in station of Thionville (Moselle)

The BB 25100 is a class of electric locomotives in service with the French railways SNCF, built by Materiel de Traction Electrique (MTE) in 1967. They are dual voltage locomotives working off both 1500 V DC and 25 kV 50 Hz AC with a top speed of 130 km/h (81 mph). The class was designed by André Jacquemin.

Originally allocated to Chalindrey, they were used on the Dijon to Metz route until supplanted by Dijon-based BB 22200. Subsequently, they operated express passenger and freight services around Dijon and also in the northeast of France. The class was eventually withdrawn by 2006.

4 of the class were sold in 2007 to GFR - Grup Feroviar Român, Bucharest of Romania (25109 and 25123 to 25125). Three have been renumbered to 425 109-2, 425 123-3 and 425 125-8. The fourth loco 25124 is believed to have been purchased by GFR for spares.
