= SNCF Class BB 9400 =

French class of electric locomotives

SNCF BB 9400
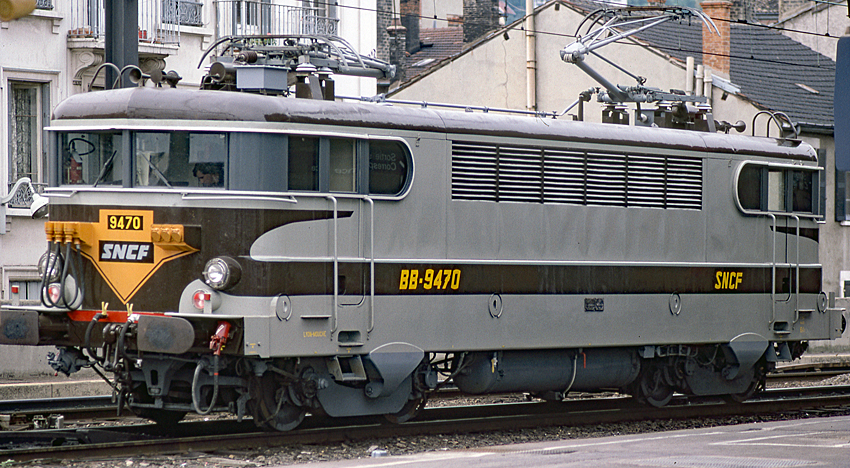
- BB 9470 at Lyon-Perrache in 1982
Type and origin
- Power type: Electric
- Designer: Paul Arzens; André Jacquemin
- Builder: Fives/MTE, mechanical; CEM/MTE, electrical
- Build date: 1967–1969
- Total produced: 135
Specifications
- Configuration
  - UIC: Bo′Bo′
- Gauge: 1,435 mm (4 ft 8 1/2 in)
- Wheel diameter: 1,020 mm (40 in)
- Length
  - Over beams: 14,400 mm (570 in)
- Loco weight: 60 t (59 long tons; 66 short tons)
- Electric system/s: 1500 V DC
- Current pickup(s): Pantograph
Performance figures
- Maximum speed: 130 km/h (81 mph)
- Power output
  - Continuous: 2,210 kW (2,960 hp)
- Tractive effort: 270 kN (61,000 lb_{f})
Career
- Numbers: 9401–9535
- Nicknames: Vespa

The SNCF Class BB 9400 was a class of Bo'Bo' electric locomotives of SNCF. They were used to haul L’Aquilon, a high-speed passenger train between Paris, Dijon and Lyon-Perrache. The locomotives were given the nickname "Vespa", as they were very lightweight. They were one of a series of locomotives referred to as "BB Jacquemin", as they used bogies designed by engineer André Jacquemin. The locomotive itself was designed by noted French railway designer Paul Arzens. In later years they hauled passenger trains on the difficult Béziers–Neussargues line.

The locomotive series was built between 1967 and 1969, numbered 9401 to 9535. These fell into two groups; the original group was limited to 120 km/h (75 mph), with units BB 9531 to 9535 capable of 180 km/h (110 mph). These units operated under a 1,500 V DC catenary, with a power of 2,210 kW (2,960 hp). The locomotives are 14.40 m (47 ft 3 in) long and weigh 60 t (59 long tons; 66 short tons). They were fitted for multiple unit and push–pull working. Some were modified in the 1980s to work in freight service and reclassified as BB 9600, with sound-proofed cabins and a unified control stand for the operator. The class was withdrawn from service by 1994, with one example, BB 9411, preserved on display at the Gare de Nîmes.
