= SNCF Class BB 62400 =

French locomotives

Class BB 62400
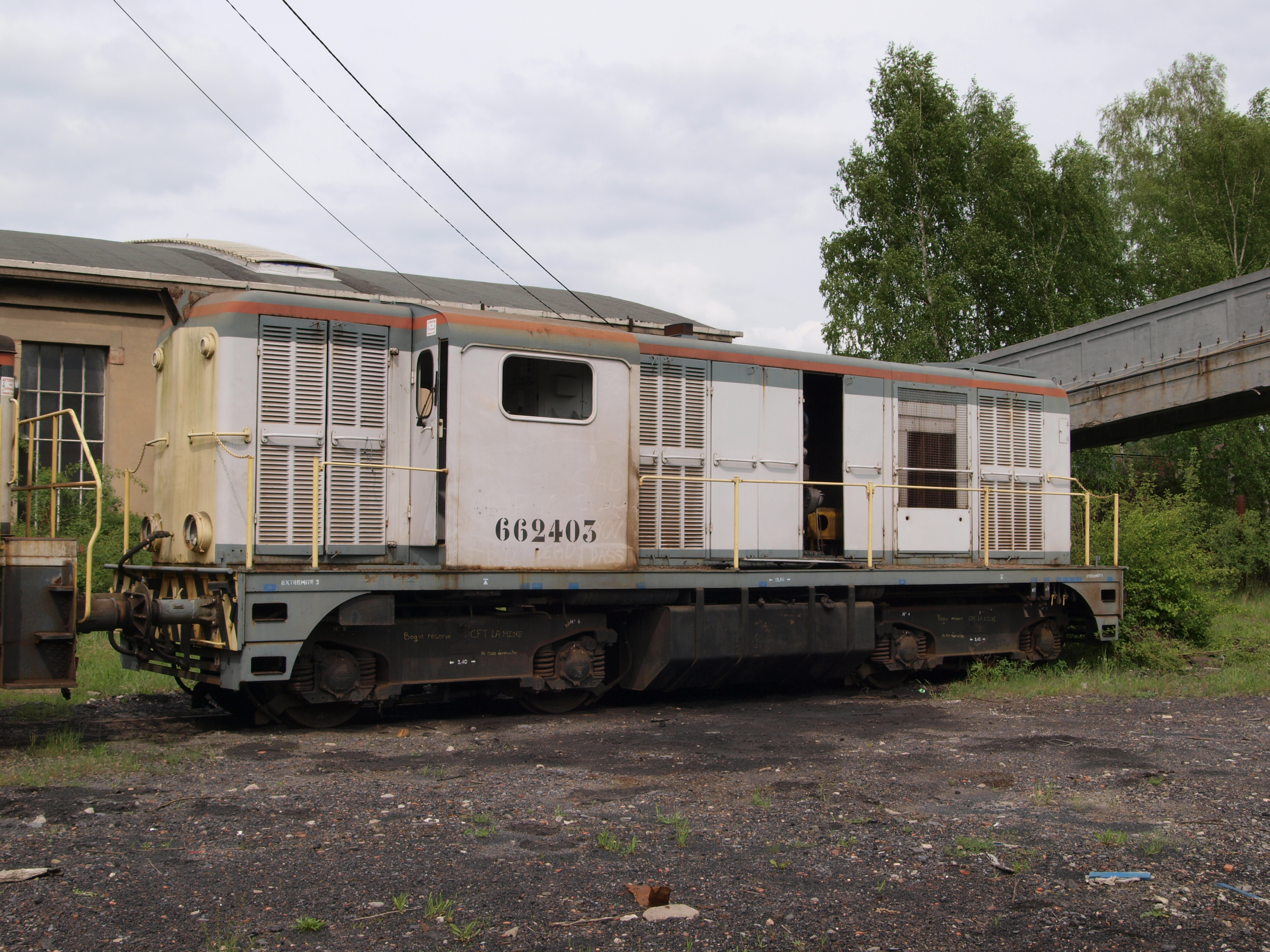
- Locomotive in 2008.
Type and origin
- Power type: Diesel-electric
Specifications
- Gauge: 1,435 mm (4 ft 8 1/2 in)
Career
- Operators: SNCF
- Retired: December 19, 2007

The SNCF Class BB 62400 diesel locomotives were former NS Class 2400 locomotives purchased by the SNCF between 1990 and 1992. They were retired by the French railway on December 19, 2007.
