= SNCF Class BB 20004 =

SNCF BB20004
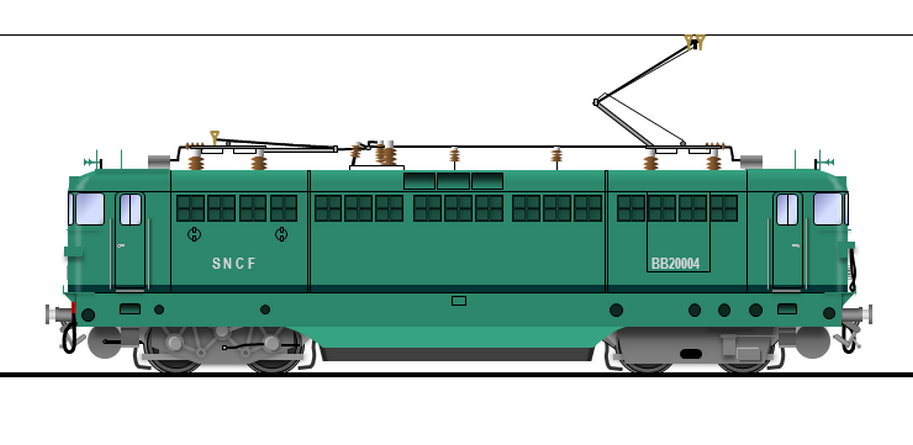
Type and origin
- Power type: Electric
- Builder: Alsthom
- Build date: 1959 (rebuilt from BB16540)
Specifications
- Configuration
  - UIC: Bo-Bo
- Gauge: 1,435 mm (4 ft 8 1/2 in)
- Length: 14.40 m (47 ft 3 in)
- Width: 2.99 m (9 ft 10 in)
- Height: 3.63 m (11 ft 11 in)
- Loco weight: 70 short tons (64 t; 63 long tons)
- Electric system/s: Catenary; 1.5 kV DC; 25 kV AC
- Current pickup(s): Pantograph
- Traction motors: two TOA646 A1 1.5 kV DC traction motors
- Safety systems: Crocodile
Performance figures
- Maximum speed: 150 km/h (93 mph)
- Power output: 2,610 kW (3,500 hp) under 25 kV; 1,150 kW (1,540 hp) under 1.5 kV
Career
- Operators: SNCF
- Number in class: 1
- First run: 1959
- Disposition: reinstated to BB16540

The SNCF class BB 20004 locomotive was a dual-voltage test-bed locomotive transformed from the damaged BB16540 in 1959. After the end of its test period in 1969 it was reinstated with its original equipment under its original number BB16540.

== History ==
SNCF had already experimented with three other dual-voltage locomotives in the 1950s, but these were all rebuilt from a DC locomotive and could only deliver their full power under 25 kV. Power output under 1.5 kV was reduced to 10% of the full power which is nearly negligible. This was however no real problem, as these locomotives operated only on Aix-les-Bains – Annecy and only needed the 1.5 kV DC to pull trains into the station of Aix-les-Bains or to drive to their depot in Chambéry.

In the late-1950s SNCF ordered the BB8500 and BB17000 locomotives. As all new locomotives were ordered in three versions at that time (DC-only, AC-only, dual-voltage), the same applied to the "Danseuses" locomotives: a dual-voltage version, called BB25500 was ordered later in the early 1960s but was part of the same locomotive family as BB8500 and BB17000 locomotives.

In order to get an idea of how to realise the first "real" dual-voltage locomotive, the damaged BB16540 locomotive was rebuilt in 1959 to dual-voltage and renumbered BB20004.

== Prototype for later designs ==
Unlike the previous three dual-voltage locomotives, which were only meant to operate on Aix-Annecy and got 1.5 kV equipment for the purposes described above, this locomotive can be considered the first "real" SNCF dual-voltage locomotive.

Next to its present AC equipment, a small DC equipment was built in to operate under 1.5 kV, however with limited power. Although BB20004 is generally considered the prototype of the BB25500 locomotives this is not entirely true. BB25500 locomotives are based on BB16500 locomotives for the greater part, but some equipments were either parts which were not used on BB16500 locomotives but on older locomotives, or entirely new designs. BB20004 contributed however a big part to the realisation of the BB25500 and later dual-voltage locomotives and expanded the knowledge of dual-voltage locomotives greatly.
