= SNCF Class BB 300 =

Class of pre WW2 French electric locomotives

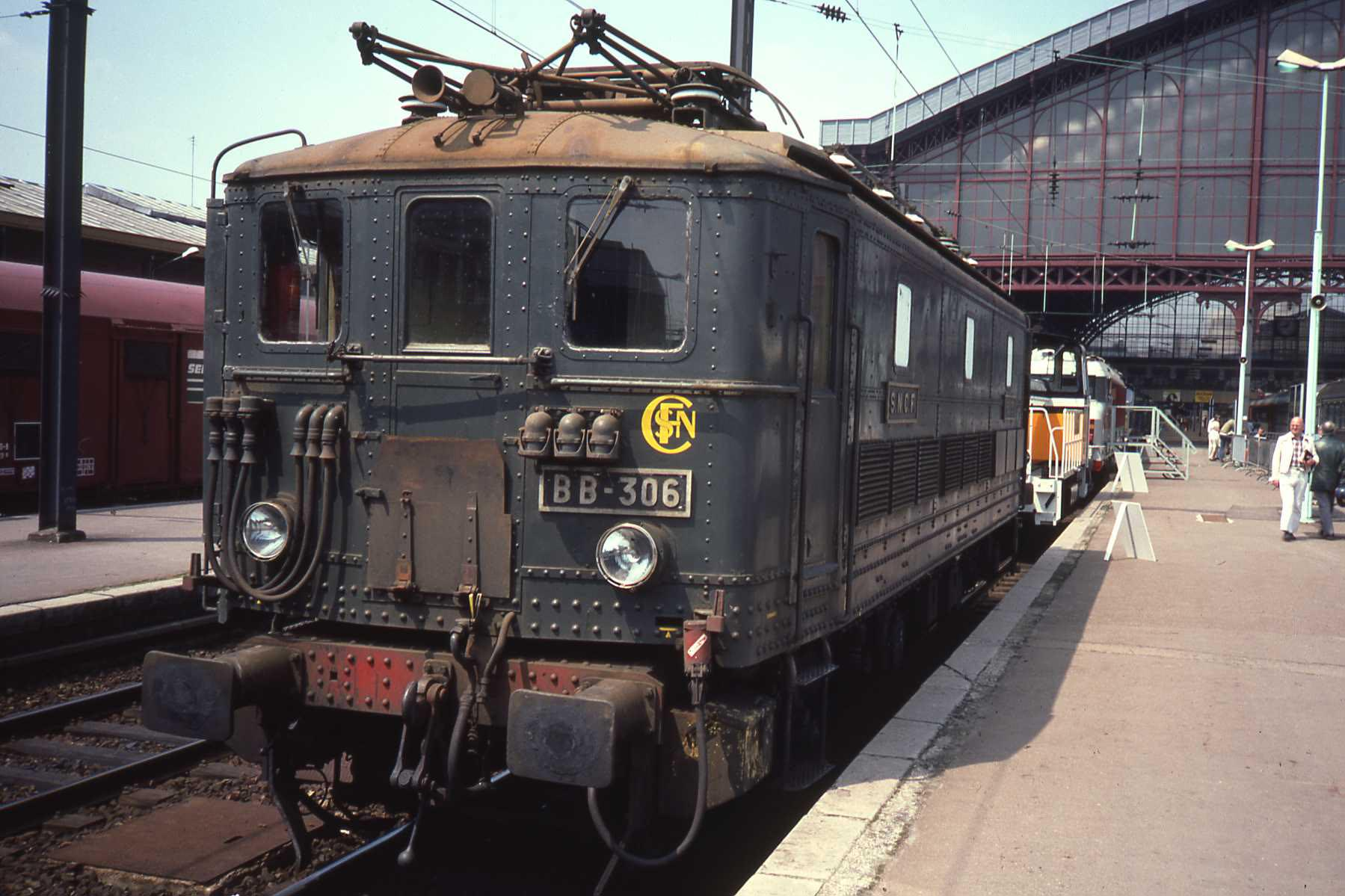
- 306 at Lille Flandres in 1984.
Type and origin
- Power type: Electric
- Builder: Siemens/Alsthom
- Build date: 1938–1939
- Total produced: 24
Specifications
- Configuration
  - UIC: Bo′Bo′
  - Commonwealth: Bo-Bo
- Gauge: 1,435 mm (4 ft 8 1/2 in)
- Wheel diameter: 1,350 mm (53 in)
- Length
  - Over body: 12.930 m (42 ft 5.1 in)
- Loco weight: 80 t (79 long tons; 88 short tons)
- Electric system/s: 1500 V dc
- Current pickup: Pantograph
Performance figures
- Maximum speed: 105 km/h (65 mph) as built; 75 km/h (47 mph) rebuilt
- Power output
  - Continuous: 1,240 kW (1,660 hp) as built; 1,060 kW (1,420 hp) rebuilt
Career
- Operators: SNCF; Nederlandse Spoorwegen
- Class: BB 300
- Number in class: 24
- Numbers: E 241–E 264; BB 301–BB 324, omitting BB 318
- Retired: 1997

The SNCF Class BB 300 was a class of 24 electric locomotives built between 1938 and 1939. Originally ordered by the Paris–Orleans/Midi railway as a development of the Midi Class E4700 for fast services from Paris to Bordeaux and Toulouse. As delivered they were numbered E 241–E 264. Under the 1950 renumbering scheme they became BB 301–BB 324. E 258 was destroyed in 1944 so never became BB 318. In 1949, 11 locomotives were leased to Nederlandse Spoorwegen, returning to SNCF in 1951.

Between 1977 and 1987, the class was rebuilt as shunters with the top speed reduced to 75 km/h (47 mph). The class was withdrawn in 1997 after nearly 60 years in service.
