= SNCF Class CC 70000 =

SNCF CC 70000
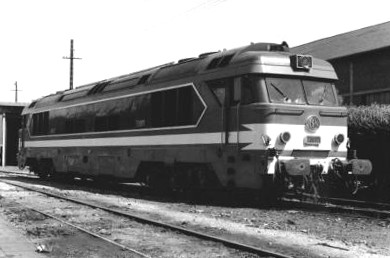
- CC 70001
Type and origin
- Power type: Diesel-electric
- Builder: Alsthom-Chantiers de l'Atlantique/SEMT
- Build date: 1965-1966
- Total produced: 2
Specifications
- Configuration
  - UIC: C′C′
- Gauge: 1,435 mm (4 ft 8 1/2 in)
- Length: 22.730 m (74 ft 7 in)
- Loco weight: 117 tonnes (115 long tons; 129 short tons)
- Fuel type: Diesel
- Fuel capacity: 4,500 L (990 imp gal)
- Prime mover: 2× SEMT Pielstick 16PA4
- Alternator: Alsthom ATD2 bi-rotor
- Traction motors: 2× TAO 656 A
- Cylinders: 2× V16
- Transmission: diesel-electric (AC-DC): three-phase alternator, silicon rectifiers to DC traction motors
Performance figures
- Maximum speed: 140 km/h (87 mph) (Passenger ratio); 85 km/h (53 mph) (Goods ratio)
- Power output: 3,000 kW (4,000 hp)
- Tractive effort: 51,750 lbf (230,200 N) 30,375 lbf (135,110 N) @ 49 mph (79 km/h) (Passenger ratio); 69,075 lbf (307,260 N); 40,500 lbf (180,000 N) @ 37 mph (60 km/h) (Goods ratio)
Career
- Operators: SNCF
- Numbers: CC 70001–70002
- Withdrawn: 1983
- Disposition: Both scrapped

SNCF CC 70000 was a class of two prototype high power diesel-electric locomotives numbered CC 70001 and 70002. They were built at the same time as a diesel-hydraulic version, BB 69000.

== Transmission ==
The locomotives were an attempt to produce a new class of locomotives of extremely high power. Two high-speed diesel engines producing 2,000 hp each could provide this, but existing electric transmissions were unable to handle so much. New techniques were needed, with several innovations.

A three-phase AC alternator was used, rather than a DC generator. This avoided the commutator needed, which had become a limitation on power and machine speed for large locomotives. The AC current was then rectified by arrays of silicon diodes and the DC produced was fed to the two traction motors. The motor voltage was 1,800V at a continuous current rating of 980A, 1,030A (one hour) and 1,580A peak for starting. Control of power was by controlling the excitation of the alternator, although there was also a single step of field weakening for the motors.

The Alsthom ATD2 alternator was itself an innovative design in which two diesel engines drove a common alternator sited between them. The size of the alternator had also become a limitation at this time, requiring it to be either larger or spun more rapidly in order to handle the power. However both of these increased the centrifugal forces on the alternator, making its mechanical construction more difficult. The innovation was to have no stator but instead two concentric rotors spinning in opposite directions. The two engines each rotated in the same relative direction, but were mounted at opposite ends with their drive through Geislinger couplings, and so drove the rotors contra-rotating. Each diesel engine ran at up to 1,500 rpm so the effective rotational speed of the alternator was 3,000 rpm, between the two parts. The inner rotor carried the field, supplied by two slip rings, with the outer rotor delivering its current through three more slip rings. There were only two roller bearings for each rotor with the outer rotor bearings carried on the frame and the inner rotor carried on the frame at one end and inside the other rotor at the far end: this was the only bearing running at the full 3,000 rpm relative speed. Unlike some twin-engined locomotives, both engines needed to be running in service. The alternator brushgear would overheat if one was not rotating and also the cooling airflow would be inadequate. The auxiliaries were split between the two engines: electrical charging and the alternator excitation on one, and the brake compressor on the other.

There were two traction motors, each mounted on an Alsthom 3-axle monomotor bogie of the same design as the electric CC 40100. The bogies had two gear ratios, which could be selected when stationary, giving top speeds of either 140 km/h (87 mph) for passenger services or 85 km/h (53 mph) for freight.

== See also ==
- HS4000 Kestrel
