= SNCF Class BB 16500 =

Class of French electric locomotives

SNCF BB 16500
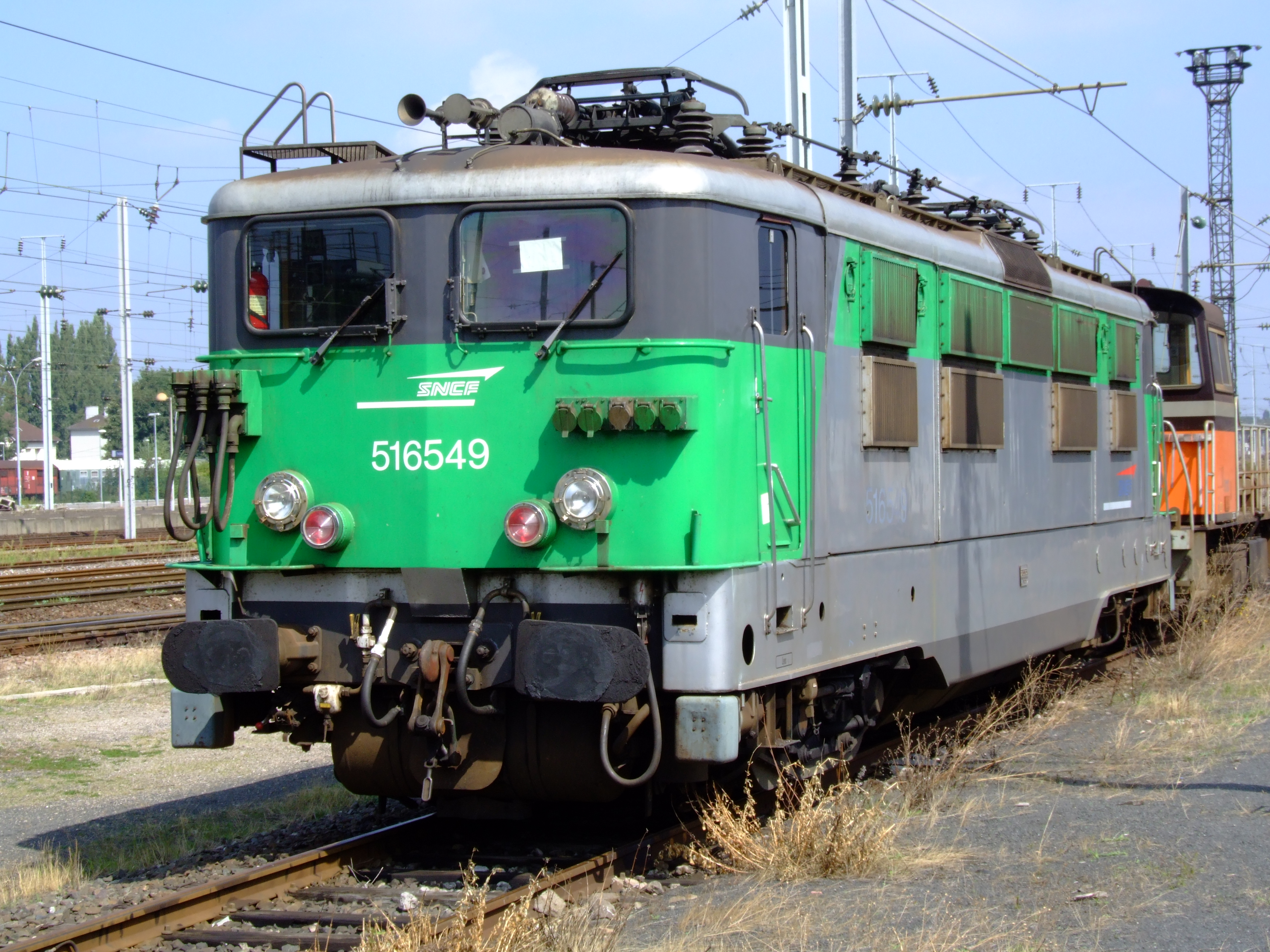
- SNCF 516549 at Thionville
Type and origin
- Power type: Electric
- Builder: Alsthom
- Build date: 1958–1964
- Total produced: 294
Specifications
- Configuration
  - UIC: B′B′
- Gauge: 1,435 mm (4 ft 8 1/2 in) standard gauge
- Wheel diameter: 1,100 millimetres (43 1/4 in)
- Length: 14.40 m (47 ft 3 in)
- Width: 2.985 m (9 ft 9 1/2 in)
- Power supply: 25 kV 50 Hz AC
- Current pickup: Pantograph
- Traction motors: TAO 646A1 (×2)
Performance figures
- Maximum speed: 140 km/h (87 mph)
- Power output
  - Continuous: 2,580 kW (3,460 hp)
- Tractive effort: 324 kN (73,000 lb_{f})/192 kN (43,000 lb_{f})
Career
- Operators: SNCF TER
- Class: BB 16500
- Numbers: 16501–16794
- Nicknames: Danseuses
- Locale: Lille, Reims, Metz, Strasbourg
- Withdrawn: 2002–2011

The SNCF BB 16500s were a class of SNCF electric locomotives operating at a supply voltage of 25 kV single-phase 50 Hz AC.

Ordered from 1954 as part of the electrification of the radial lines from Paris to the north and east of France, a total of 294 locomotives were delivered between 1958 and 1964, which made them the most numerous class of electric locomotives put into service by the SNCF. These versatile machines operated over all the lines of the north-eastern quarter of France at the head of regional passenger trains or freight trains, descending as far as the Jura, Dole-Vallorbe, or venturing to the Channel coast at Cherbourg or Le Havre. Some locomotives also operated on the northern and eastern suburban lines of Paris. Eventually competition from more modern classes and the discomfort of their driving cabs, led to the locomotives all being withdrawn between 2001 and 2011.

== Genesis of the class ==
In the second half of the 1950s, the Paris–Lille line was electrified with single-phase alternating current. The radial routes, from Paris to the east of France, were also electrified. The original fleet of locomotives was made up of BB 16000s, a synthesis of the driving qualities of the BB 12000s put into service between Valenciennes and Thionville in 1954 and the bodies of the BB 9200s, the first of which had been operating since 1957 on the lines linking Paris to Lyon, Toulouse and Bordeaux.

In 1954, studies for the design of a locomotive dedicated to mixed traffic service, passenger and freight, were launched under the direction of Louis Armand and Fernand Nouvion . The specifications stipulated that these 2,000 kW locomotives would have a weight of approximately 60 t (59 long tons; 66 short tons), that they must only be equipped with one motor per bogie and have a double gear ratio limiting the speed to 90 or 150 km/h (56 or 93 mph) depending on the use of the machine. Alsthom 's design was finally chosen, in preference to that of MTE, manufacturer of the BB 16000s.

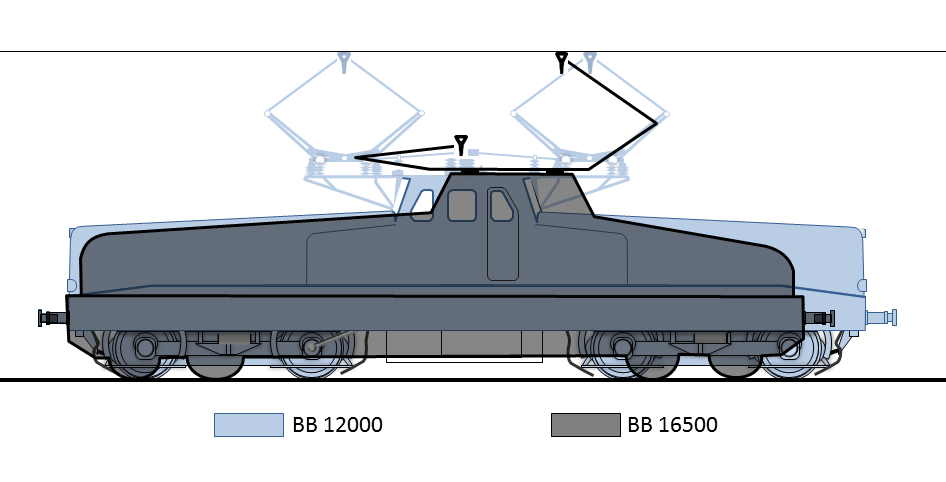
Initial proposal

A first sketch, not proceeded with, gave the locomotives an appearance quite similar to that of the BB 12000, with a single cab framed by two engine cowls of different lengths, giving the locomotive a total length of 14.210 m (46.62 ft). However, the single-cab formula, though it simplified the wiring of the locomotive, prohibited operation in multiple, so the BB 16500's final design would be a locomotive of a more classic configuration with two cabs. The performance was finally established at 100 and 140 km/h (62 and 87 mph) for a continuous power rating of 2,580 kW and a mass of 74 t (73 long tons; 82 short tons) ; the increase in power allowed a slightly higher speed in freight ratio but the excessive flexibility of the suspension limited the maximum speed in passenger ratio; the redesign of the general architecture was accompanied by a significant increase in weight, which seems to have been clearly underestimated in the preliminary study, (Note: The desire to reduce the weight of the locomotive was such that, after a few days of testing at the head of heavy trains, the buffing beams of the locomotive used were severely deformed.) and a slight increase in length.

== Description ==
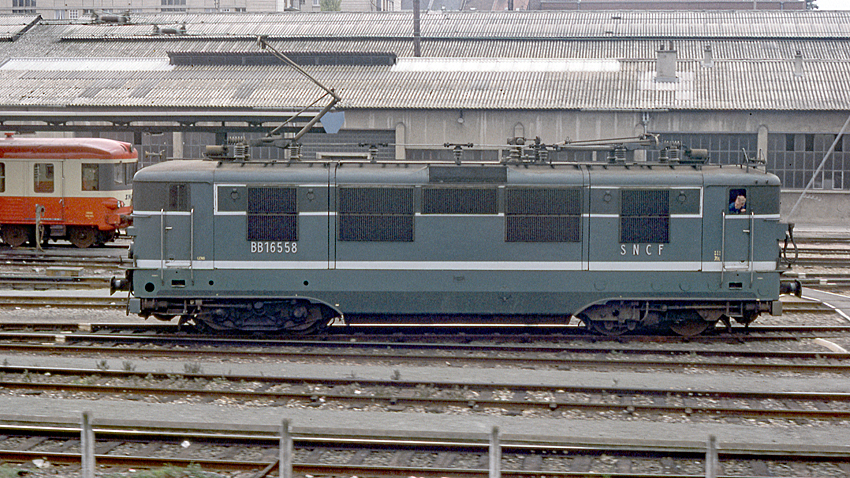
BB 16558 at Abbeville, 1982

=== Technical characteristics ===
The BB 16500 were single-phase 25 kV/50 Hz, medium-power machines, built in the Alsthom factories in Belfort .

Each locomotive consisted of a chassis which supported the two driver's cabs and three removable covers, each of which includes part of the sides and the roof, and the end covers supporting the pantographs. The shape of the body, 14.40 m (47.2 ft) long, was inspired by those of the first CC 7100s . It included, when the locomotives were first put into service, cab glazing allowing a wide panoramic view thanks to the provision of corner windows. These were replaced by sheet metal uprights during major overhauls of the locomotives between 1965 and 1970.

The power train incorporates a large part of the elements already used on the BB 12000 and BB 16000 classes. The rectifiers, two mercury vapor igniters, supply the traction motors with rectified and smoothed current. As deliveries and technical improvements progressed, the ignitrons were replaced by later types of rectifiers, then finally by silicon diodes; this last type, more powerful, is finally applied to the whole of the seriesduring overhauls.

As provided for in the specifications, the short-wheelbase, 1.608 m (5 ft 3.3 in), single-engine bogies had a gear ratio change that could be operated when stationary, a device that sometimes tended to jam; three sets of reduction gears, with slightly different ratios, were fitted to the locomotives. The first batch, BB 16501 to BB 16654, had a suspension by elastic return legs and pivots; while the remaining locomotives, BB 16655 to BB 16794, had a pendular suspension. (Note: BB 16655, last of the first batch, should have had a suspension by elastic crutches, but it was converted into the experimental CC 10002 during manufacture. When it was returned to the original specification, it received a pendular suspension.) To improve cab comfort, the fitting of a double-decker suspension, replacing the original systems in place, was carried out on 120 locomotives from 1998 to 2003.

294 members of the class were built in six years. They were ordered in several successive stages, as electrification progressed in the north and east. In 2021, they constitute the largest series of electric locomotives ordered by the SNCF. The class was also the first member of the BB Alsthom family which also includes 146 BB 8500 (some rebuilt as class BB 88500 or BB 8700), 105 BB 17000, 13 BB 20200 and 194 BB 25500.

=== Liveries ===
The BB 16500s carried, during their careers, a great variety of liveries, some concerning only a few locomotives, sometimes very temporarily.

The first BB 16500s left the factory were uniformly green, without any decoration. The next batch were put into service in a light bluish green livery with a "Celtic green" band at the bottom of the body but the light bluish green was quickly replaced with a darker shade. In 1970-71, and like their cousins the BB 8500, BB 17000 and BB 25500, they adopted a dark green colour enhanced with white stripes on the sides, framing the ventilation louvres, themselves painted in dark grey, a colour repeated on the fronts in the form of "moustaches". The reporting numbers were daffodil yellow. BB 16595 and BB 16625, withdrawn on 26 March 26, 2002 and 15 December 2003, were the last locomotives to have kept this livery until the end of their career.

The "concrete" livery, grey with orange bands, was used on a large number of SNCF engines from the 1980s, including 278 BB 16500s.

On an experimental basis, BB 16604 and BB 16789 were repainted between 1992 and 1998 with the "Arzens livery", composed of grey and "havana brown" for one, and grey and "garrigue green" for the other, with orange moustaches. Though not extended to any more BB 16500s, this livery was also successfully applied to many BB 9400s.

The five BB 16500s of the "dromedary trains", assigned to the TER Picardie, were painted in concrete grey with front faces and the frame of the shutters in "parrot green".

Seven of the 156 machines dedicated to the freight sector received, in the early 2000s, a livery of green, grey and white arranged in a "Neapolitan slice".

BB 16583, withdrawn on 8 October 2009, is the only one to have worn the "Île-de-France" livery, which was much more common among BB 17000s.

BB 16500 liveries

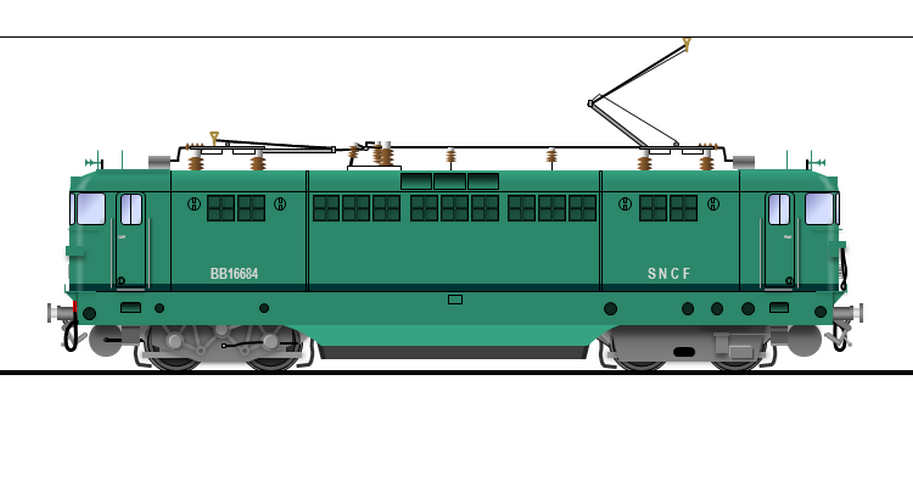
BB 16684, light bluish green with a "Celtic green" band.

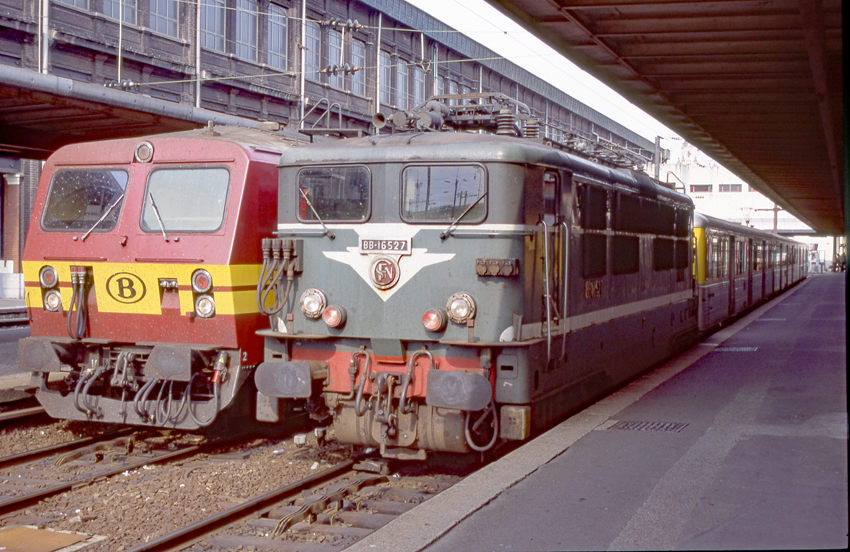
BB 16527, Dark green with white stripes (Lille, 1995).

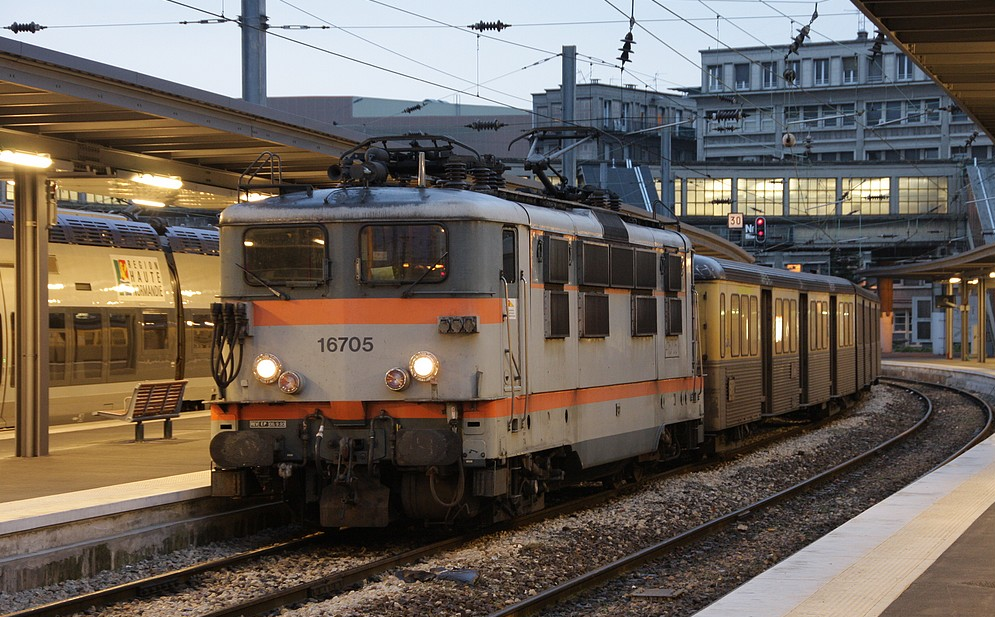
BB 16705, Concrete
(Amiens, 2009).

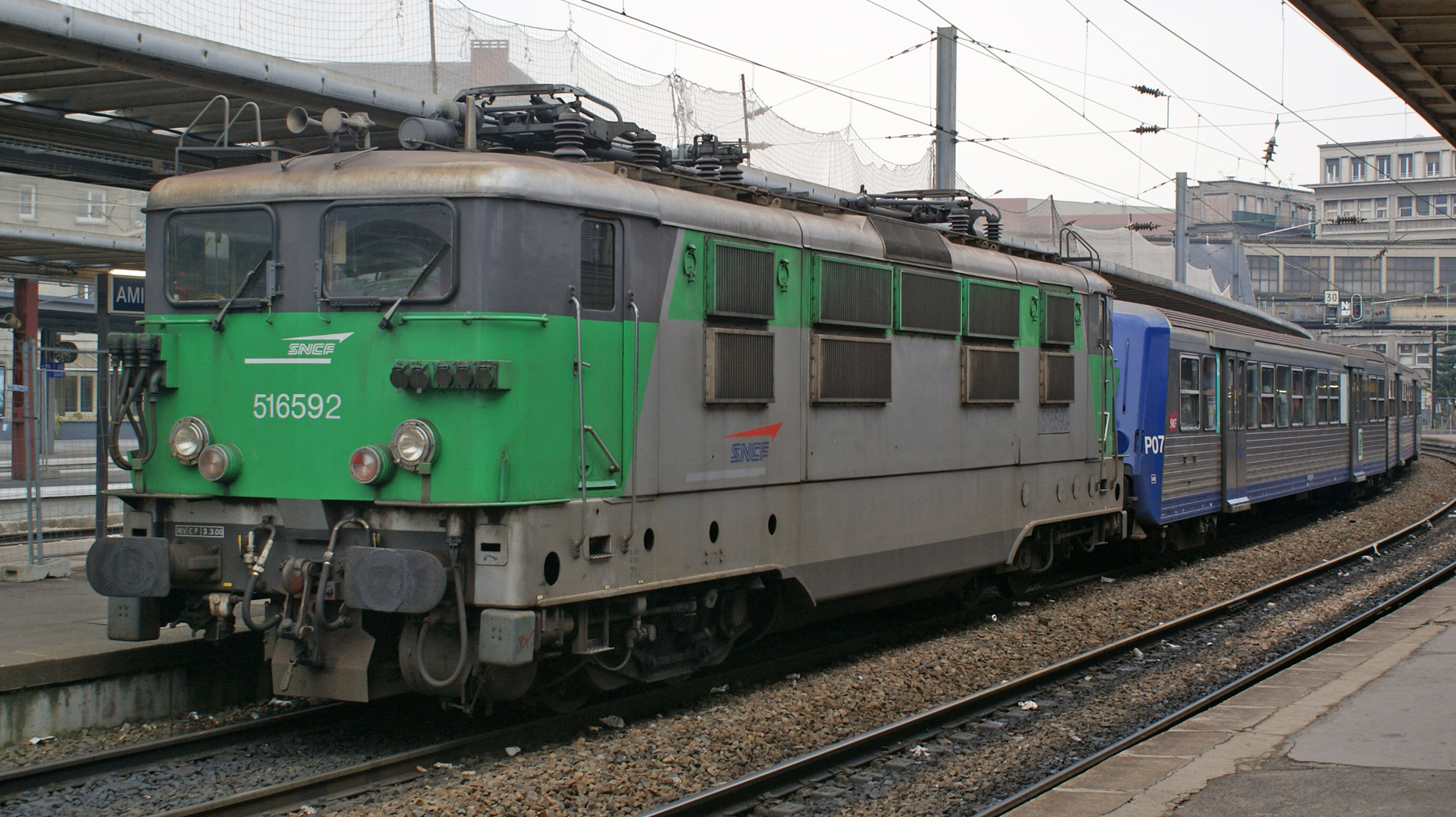
BB 16592, TER Picardie
(Amiens, 2009).

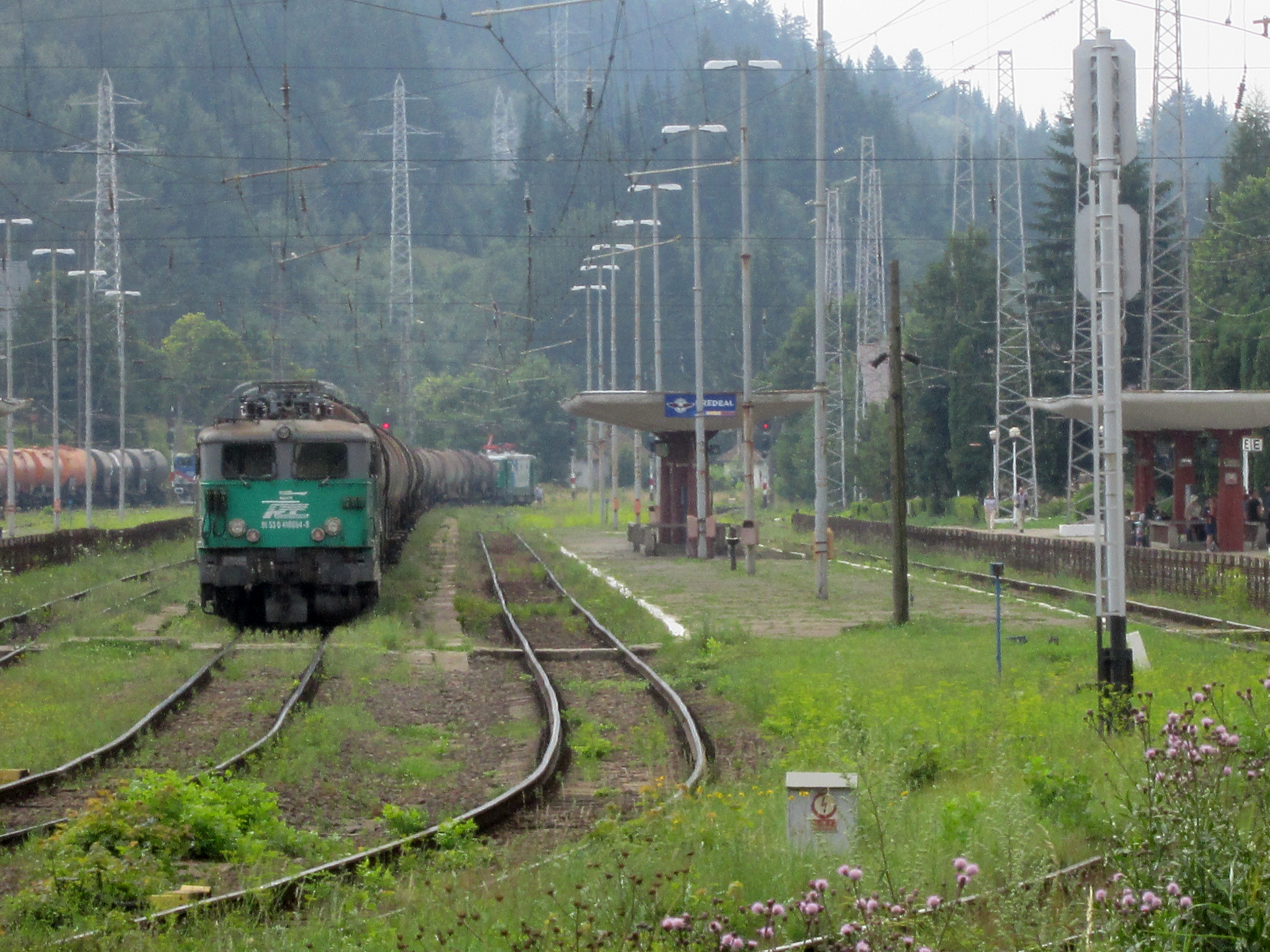
BB 16500, Fret (Predeal, Roumanie, 2016).

== Career ==
=== Rise and Climax ===
Deliveries of BB 16500s commenced on 25 July 1958 with BB 16501, assigned to the Strasbourg depot, and ended on 26 November 1964 with BB 16794, commissioned at Paris-La Chapelle.

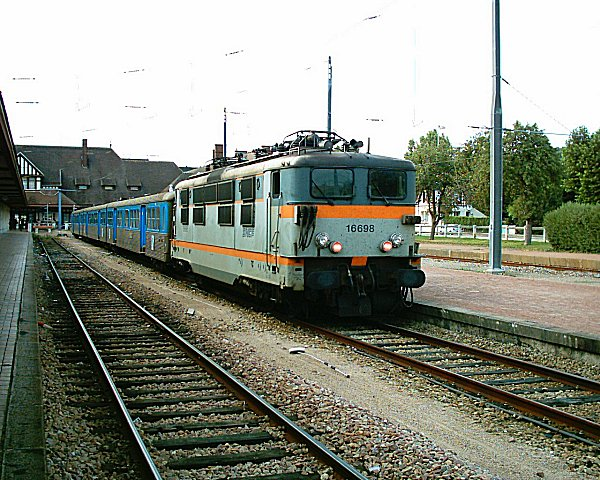
SNCF BB 16698 with RRR set at Trouville-Deauville, 2004

The first locomotives were used in 1958 on the Luxembourg – Metz – Strasbourg – Basel route, where their performance immediately exceeded the requirements of the specification, then on the northern suburbs of Paris, whose lines had just been electrified. Their radius of action was rapidly expanding as the north-eastern network was electrified. In 1965, a quota was allotted to Dole, where they hauled international trains like the Orient-Express, sometimes double headed.

At the end of 1964, the class was complete and the north-east network being fully electrified, the BB 16500s provided very varied services in an area ranging from Dunkirk to Paris and Vallorbe. However, the BB 25500, dual-current heirs to the BB 16500, were introduced on the Jura lines and began to replace them in the spring of 1965, completely supplanting them by 1968. In the Paris region, the new BB 17000s, also derived from the BB 16500s, took over much of the northern suburban train operation from 1965. The BB 16500s then found new uses on the lines in the north-west of France, towards Le Havre, Deauville and Cherbourg.

=== Decline ===
The BB 16500s were little appreciated by drivers because of the uncomfortable ride linked to their overly flexible suspension and the short wheelbase of their bogies, hence their nickname "dancers". Nevertheless they operated a wide range of services during their careers: suburban, regional and international passenger trains, freight trains of all types, including trains over 3,000 t (3,000 long tons; 3,300 short tons). The decline of the class began at the end of the 1990s, on the Transilien Paris-Est network, with the opening of line E of the RER. The trains that they hauled were partly replaced by the Z 22500 railcars, though they worked the Bondy – Aulnay shuttle until 2003, then disappeared from the network. Some of their services were taken over by BB 17000s. In the main regions where they operated, orders for electric multiple units for the TER service and the massive order for new generation Alstom locomotives for freight confirmed their gradual decline despite good reliability, which remained remarkable in the early years of the 21st century, with only five incidents recorded per million kilometers traveled.

Despite their slow decline, the BB 16500 saw a reprieve within the TER sectors in the 2000s . They were used in combination with regional reversible trains (RRR) and only these locomotives, along with the BB 17000s and BB 25500s could fulfill this requirement. Thus for the operation of the TER Métrolor, the Lorraine region used several of the Thionville based BB 16500s from 2000.

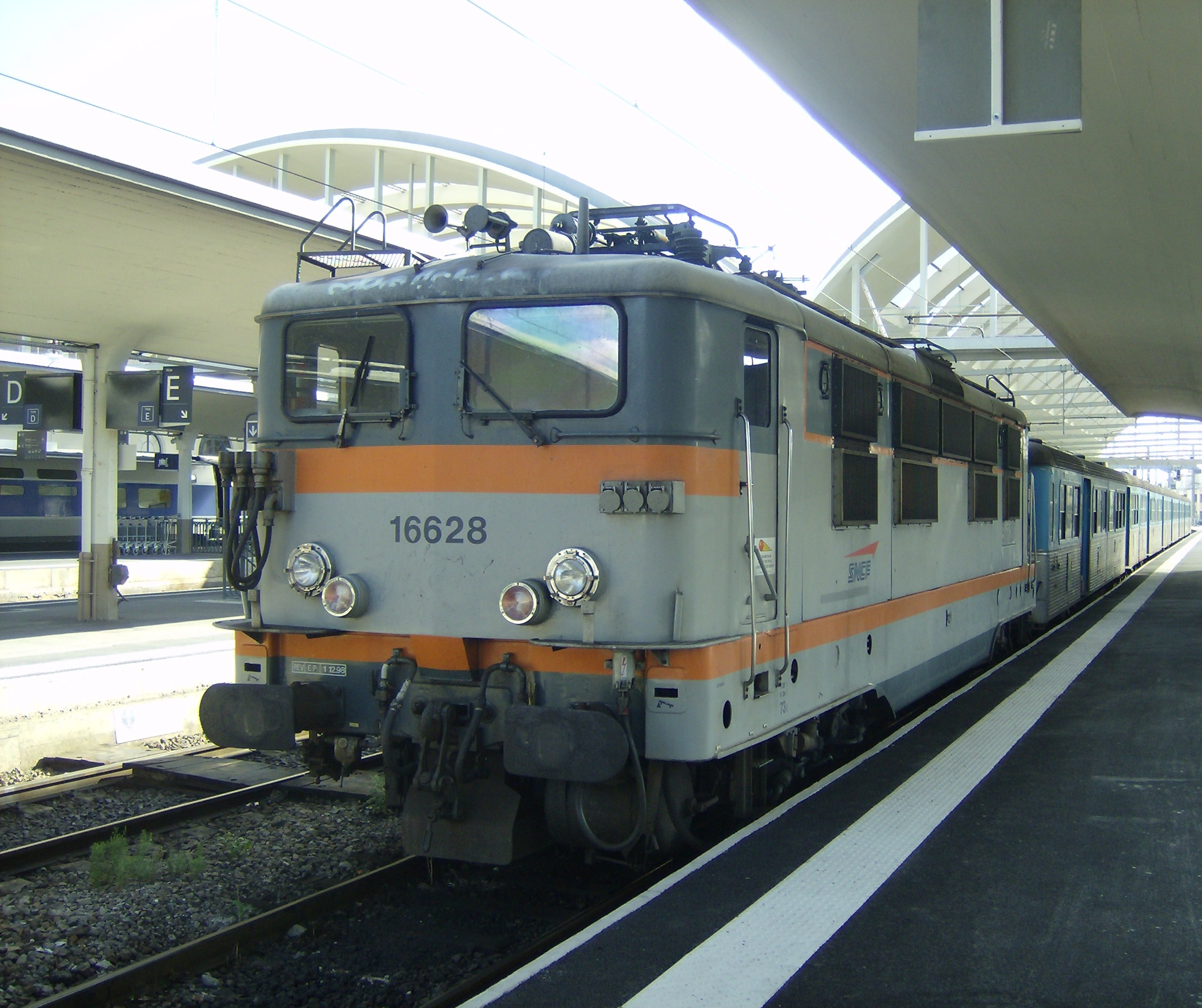
16628 at Reims, 2008

The withdrawal of the class began in 2001, and by 2004, 111 locomotives had been withdrawn. BB 16500s no longer hauled freight trains, which were taken over by the BB 27000s . The remaining contingent (including locomotives in Fret livery which retained their colours, the TER logo replacing that of Fret,) was redeployed to provide TER trains, particularly in Nord-Pas-de-Calais, Picardie, Haute and Lower Normandy, Champagne-Ardenne, Alsace and Ile-de-France.

On 17 October 2009, a farewell tour was organized in Lorraine to mark the end of the use of these locomotives. The route taken was Thionville – Hagondange – Metz – Sarrebourg – Blainville - Damelevières – Nancy – Conflans-Jarny – Longuyon – Thionville. During this route, the Waville viaduct was used although it is not normally accessible for passenger trains. The last BB 16500 left the region at the end of 2009.

By August 2010, the use of this class was significantly reduced. There were only 15 locomotives still in circulation, providing the last loco-hauled services on the TER Picardie and TER Nord-Pas-de-Calais lines. In September 2010, the last 9 locomotives were withdrawn. The last member of the class, BB 16651, was withdrawn on 9 September 2011 from Lens depot after having worked its last train on 1 September.

== Lines served ==
- Paris-Nord - Beauvais
- Paris-Est - Château-Thierry - Châlons-sur-Marne
- Paris-Est - Coulommiers
- Paris Est - Meaux
- Apach - Thionville - Woippy ( freight trains )
- Nancy - Thionville
- Nancy - Luneville
- Nancy - Epinal - Remiremont
- Nancy - Saint-Die-des-Vosges
- Nancy - Bar-le-Duc
- Metz - Saarburg
- Strasbourg - Selestat
- Strasbourg - Mulhouse
- Mulhouse - Altkirch - Belfort
- Lille - Valenciennes
- Valenciennes - Aulnoye
- Valenciennes - Cambrai
- Sedan - Charleville-Mézières - Reims - Epernay
- Charleville-Mézières - Longwy
- Amiens - Creil
- Paris Nord - Amiens
- Creil - Compiègne - Saint-Quentin - Busigny
- Arras - Dunkirk station
- Lille-Flanders - Dunkirk
- Lille-Flanders - Arras
- Basel - Mulhouse
- Bondy – Aulnay-sous-Bois, before its conversion into a tram-train line (line T4)
- Mulhouse - Dole
- Dole - Vallorbe and Frasne - Pontarlier
- Chalindrey - Toul

=== Depot allocation ===
- Achères (November 1998 to 2006)
- La Chapelle (December 1958 to 2008)
- Dolé (1963 to February 1968)
- Épernay (1981 to 2010), main workshop for the class
- Hellemmes (1958 to 1980), main workshop for the class
- Lens (1958 to 2011)
- Strasbourg (July 1958 to 2009)
- Thionville (1993 to 2010)
- La Villette (June 1962 to 2003)

== Experimental locomotives ==
BB 16540 was rebuilt into BB 20004 from 1959 to 1969, as a prototype "small dual-current" locomotive (more powerful under alternating current than under direct current); it then worked trains on the “Étoile de Savoie” lines which radiate around La Roche-sur-Foron. It was returned to the class at the end of its test period and regained its initial number.

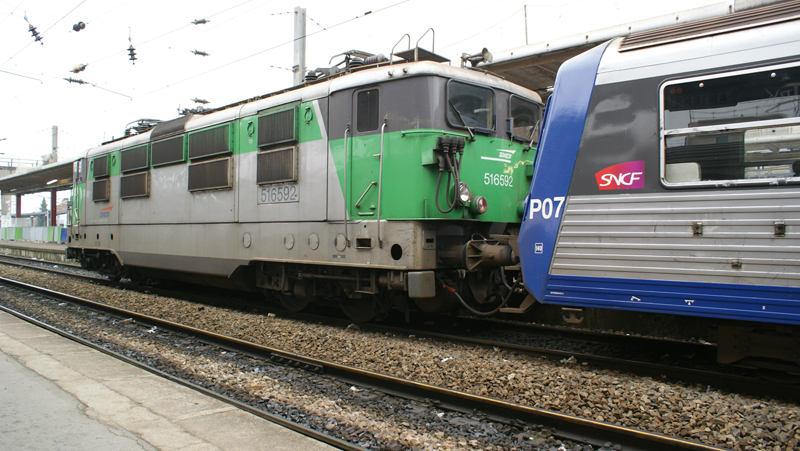
BB 16592 at the head of an RRR set at Amiens

BB 16515, BB 16549 (withdrawn in November 2007), BB 16550, BB 16575 (withdrawn in December 2006) and BB 16592 (withdrawn in December 2009) were marshalled between two stainless steel RRR push-pull fitted sets. The disadvantage of their discomfort was thus circumvented, the driver's cabs not being used in normal service. These “dromedary trains”, so called because the loco formed the camel's hump in the middle of the train, were put into service on the TER Picardie line between Paris and Beauvais. The locomotives were repainted with a service-specific livery. Since 2007 the operation of dromedary trains was abandoned with the arrival of more modern TER multiple-unit trains. The locomotives and stainless steel trains then resumed service in classic configuration on other TER Picardie routes.

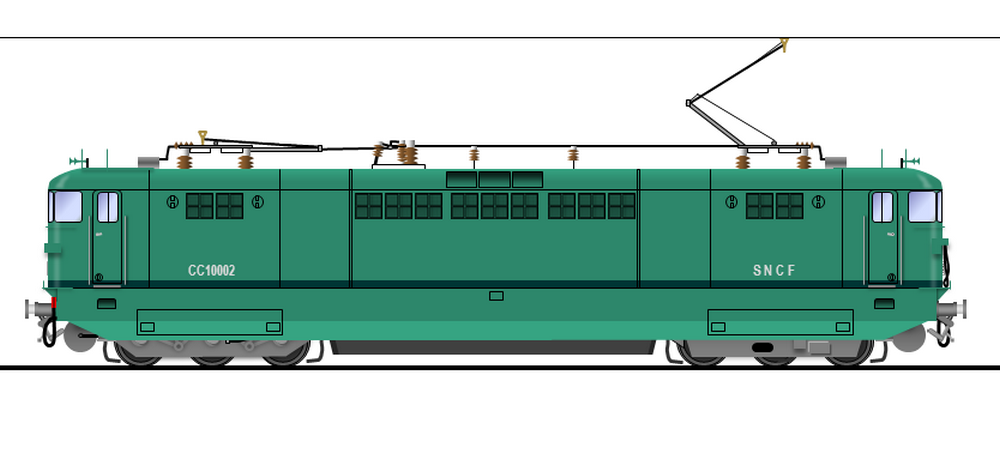
Silhouette of CC 10002.

16655 was delivered directly in 1961 as a CC 10002 prototype intended for the development of a lightweight single-engine type C bogie (three driving axles driven by the single motor of the bogie by a gear train), used on a class of Finnish diesel-electric locomotives then later on the CC 40100s, CC 72000s, CC 6500s and CC 21000s of the SNCF. It was rebuilt as a class BB 16500 under its initial number in 1970.

Scheduled for automatic coupling tests, BB 16700 was equipped for this purpose with a reinforced and elongated frame and end caps, which it kept until it was scrapped in 2007.

Between 1988 and 1990, BBs 16780 to 16784 were equipped with a multiplexing device allowing 3,700 t (3,600 long tons; 4,100 short tons) ore trains to be hauled by three locomotives distributed along the convoy and controlled by the leading locomotive thanks to a cable which transmitted the information. The principle was subsequently modified (1990-1993), with the information being transmitted from one locomotive to another by radio. The experiment was renewed in 1998-1999 with BB 16781 and 16782 with the aim of running very long, 1,000 m (3,300 ft), and very heavy, 1,950 t (1,920 long tons; 2,150 short tons), trains. The experiment did not lead to concrete achievements and the locomotives returned to their normal duties.

== Preservation ==
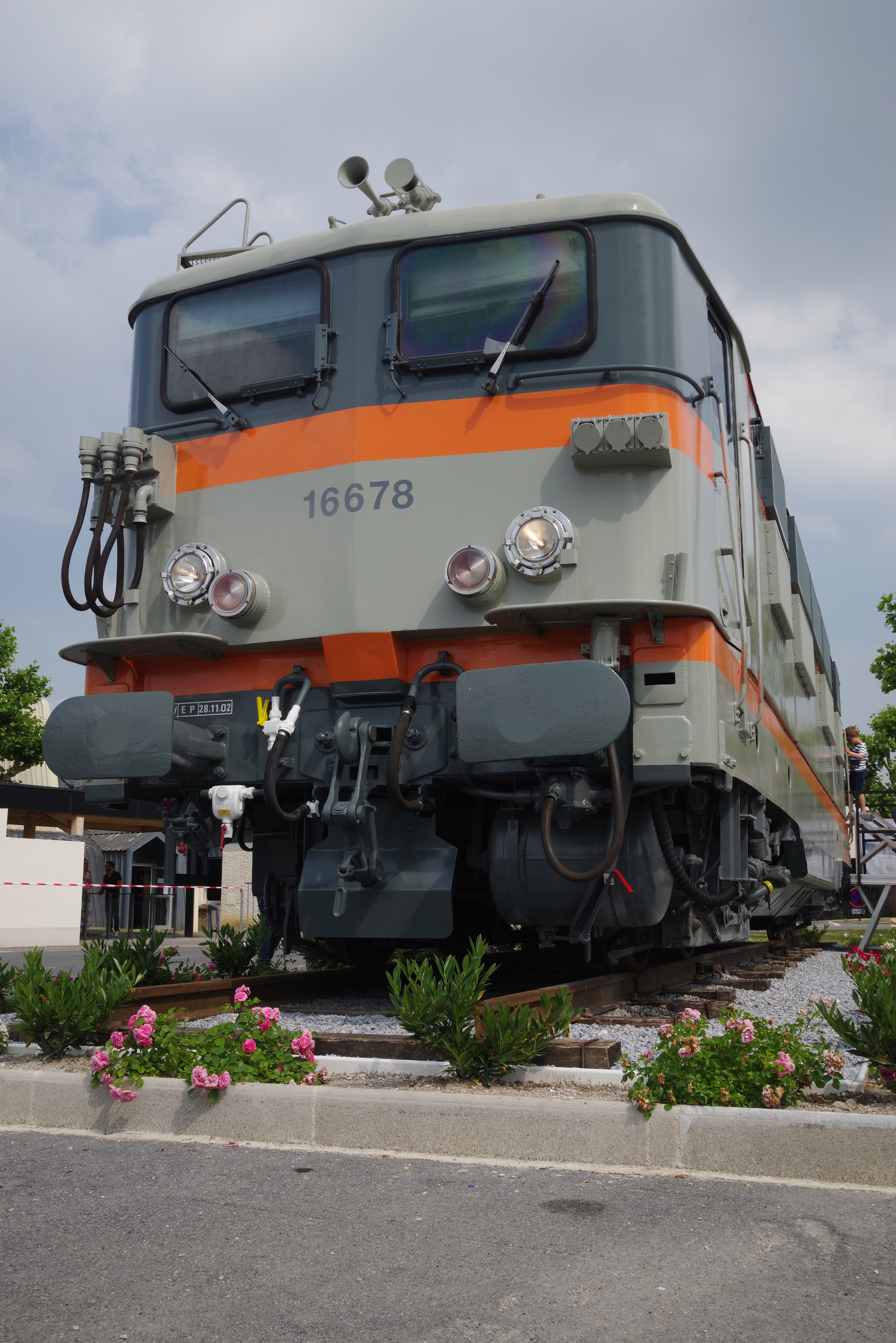
BB 16678 Magenta

Three locomotives are fully preserved. They all sport the concrete livery.

- BB 16506 is preserved by the Mining and Railway Center (CMCF), in Oignies ( Pas-de-Calais ); this association has also saved a cab from BB 16517.
- BB 16745 is parked under the Mohon rotunda, annex of the Mulhouse train museum.
- BB 16678 is preserved by the municipality of Magenta, Marne, where it is permanently exhibited on a section of track installed in the Place Roger-Pointurier. Over the weekend of 9 and 10 June 2018, this locomotive was baptized Magenta. None of the class had carried names during their time in revenue service.

== Disposal to third parties ==
Three locomotives, BB 16546, BB 16612 and BB 16654, operated by SNCF Fret, were sold to Romanian railway operator Regiotrans, now Regio Călători, in 2008, for use on freight trains.

== In popular culture ==
BB 16571 hauled the 1961 ORTF Christmas train between Lille and Paris, producing a live broadcast alternating sketches and songs on board and in the stations of Lille Flandres, Arras and Paris Nord, presented by Jean Nohain on board and Catherine Langeais in Paris.

BB 16665 appears at the beginning of the film Deux Hommes dans la ville, directed by José Giovanni in 1973.
