= SNCF CC 40100 =

French class of quad voltage electric locomotive

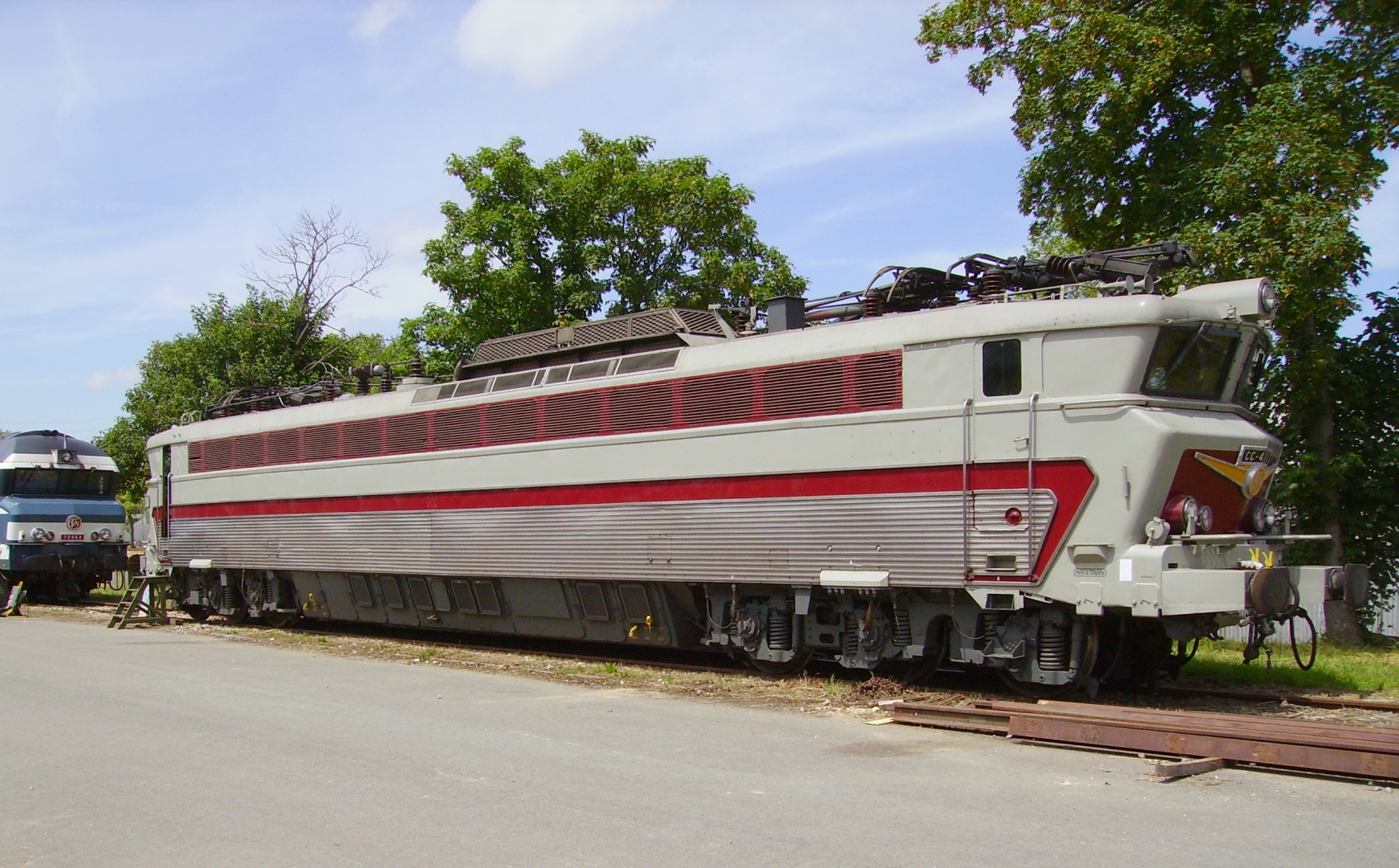
- CC 40110, now preserved
Type and origin
- Power type: Electric
- Builder: Alsthom
- Build date: 1964 (first batch of 4), 1969–1970
Specifications
- Configuration
  - UIC: C′C′
- Gauge: 1,435 mm (4 ft 8 1/2 in) standard gauge
- Length: 20.03 m (65 ft 9 in)
- Loco weight: 107 short tons (97 t; 96 long tons)
- Electric system/s: Catenary: 1,500 V DC; 3,000 V DC; 25 kV 50 Hz AC; 15 kV 16 2/3 Hz AC
- Current pickup(s): Pantograph
- Traction motors: 2×Alsthom monomotor bogies: 2× TDQ 657 A1 (40101-3); 2× TDQ 662 A1 (40104); 2× TDQ 662 B1 (40105-10)
Performance figures
- Maximum speed: 100 mph (160 km/h)/240 km/h (first four); 112 mph (180 km/h)/220 km/h (remainder of class)
- Power output
  - Continuous: (40101-3) 3,670 kW (4,920 hp); (40104-10) 4,480 kW (6,010 hp)
Career
- Operators: SNCF
- Number in class: 10
- First run: 1964
- Withdrawn: 1996
- Disposition: 3 preserved: 40101, 40109 and 40110

The SNCF CC 40100 was a French class of quad-voltage 4,340 kW (5,820 hp) electric locomotives. They were intended for high-performance passenger services on the Trans Europ Express (TEE) routes of the 1960s and 1970s. This non-stop international working required them to support the electrical standards of several networks. They are significant for combining three innovations in locomotive design: quad-voltage working, three-axle monomotor bogies and the new Nez Cassé body style of French locomotives.

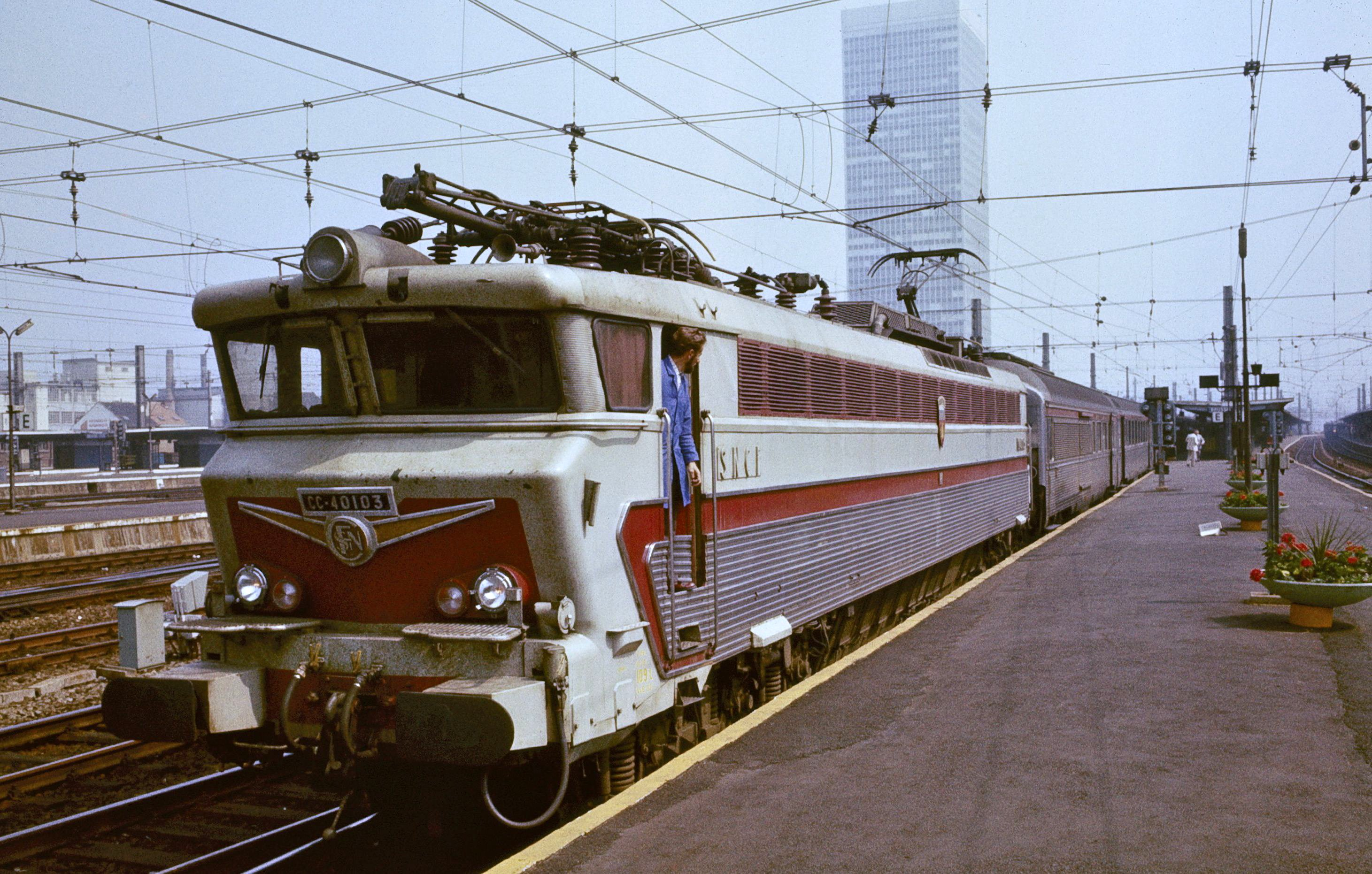
CC 40103 at the head of TEE L'Oiseau Bleu, at Brussels Midi, 1979

== Quad-voltage working ==
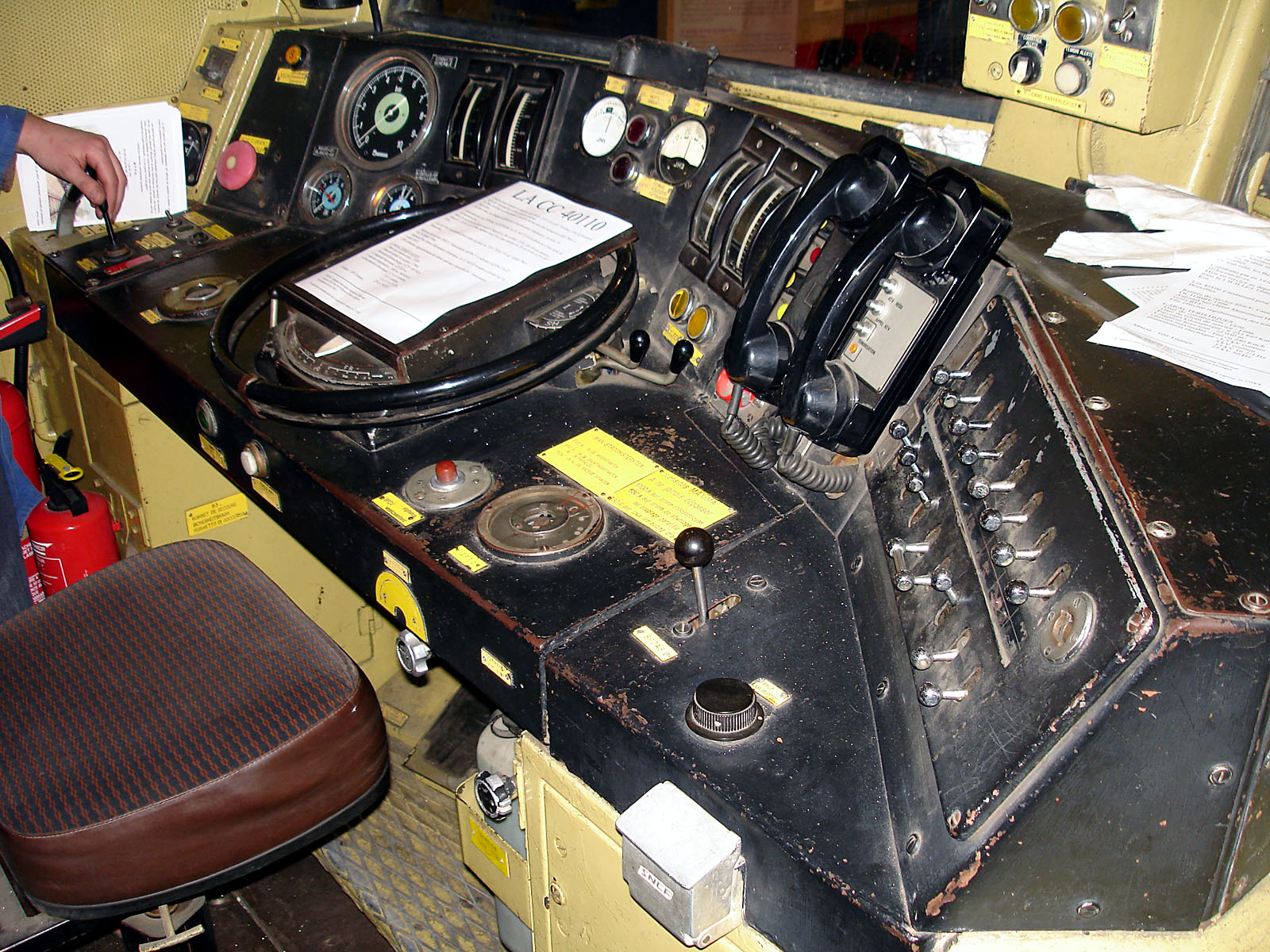
Driver's cab

With the development of the Trans Europ Express in the early 1960s over the electrified routes of North-West Europe, a powerful express passenger electric locomotive was required that could operate across the multiple voltage standards of France and Belgium. Previous designs, such as the BB 30000 (Note: The class number prefix '3' indicated triple voltage working, as the '4' indicated quad voltage.) had operated on three voltages, allowing working through the North West across France (25 kV AC and some older 1,500 V DC) into Belgium (3,000 V DC) and the Netherlands (1,500 V DC). As yet there had been no AC multi-voltage designs.

=== Goals ===
SNCF decided to build a small number of high-performance locomotives for these TEE services. They would use the modern French system of 25 kV 50 Hz AC and the DC systems of the Low Countries but would also look to future electrification of TEE services and would support the 15 kV 16 2/3 Hz AC system of West Germany, Austria and Switzerland. A top speed of 220 kilometres per hour (140 mph) was specified, with a lightweight TEE train of 210 tonnes, or 160 kilometres per hour (99 mph) for the heaviest French trains of 800 tonnes between Paris and the Belgian border at Aulnoye. They would also be able to haul full loads, at 110 kilometres per hour (68 mph), on the 1-in-37 (2.7%) gradients of the Gotthard and Lötschberg routes in Switzerland. The Belgian 3,000 V DC system could also be used in Italy.

=== Earlier multi-system locomotives ===
Dual-frequency locomotives, those working on two AC voltages and frequencies, had already been produced, as a small experimental class with four locomotives of the BB 20100 class of 1958. They were used for working between Mulhouse and Basel, into the Swiss 15 kV 16 2/3 Hz AC system. This class in turn consisted of two examples of two different designs, one using AC motors from the BB 13000 class and one with 1,500 V DC motors and excitron rectification from the later examples of the BB 16500 class.

The single BB 20004 had also been converted from a BB 16500 and demonstrated the use of both 1,500 V DC and 25 kV AC. This locomotive had the limitation of having considerably less power when using 1,500 V DC than on AC, in contrast to the BB 20005 which was almost equally powerful for each system.

An open technical question of this time was whether it was better to use AC or DC motors, DC obviously requiring rectification as well. Single phase AC motors were a new and untried technology for this application; earlier railway systems had recognised their advantages, but they had limited the line frequency to 16 2/3 Hz. Powerful motors could not yet manage the problems of either core losses or the reactive behaviour of their windings causing flashovers of the brushgear. The related 'flatiron' classes BB 12000, BB 13000, CC 14000 and CC 14100, four similar classes with different electrical approaches, were an attempt to answer these questions, and to decide upon the best system.

=== Design ===
The 40100 was to use the same 1,500 V DC motor system as the « bicourant », but with silicon rectifiers. For 1,500 V DC the voltage would be applied directly to the traction motors. These traction motors had paired armature windings. At 1,500 V they could be connected in parallel or series. For 3,000 V DC they were only used in series. Resistances were used for starting and for rheostatic braking.

AC operation was by transformer to reduce the voltage, then silicon rectifiers to convert it to DC.

Four pantographs were fitted, two at each end, with separate pantographs used for each mechanical catenary system. Each was capable of operating at full speed in either direction. Some used the same pantograph for multiple electrical systems. Automatic interlocks and 'feeler' relays were used to avoid accidental cross-connections.

Pantograph arrangement of the CC 40100
Position Counted from driver's cab 1 end	1	2		3	4	
Voltage	15 kV AC	3 kV DC	1.5 kV DC	15 kV AC	25 kV AC	3 kV DC
Railway companies	SBB	SNCB; CFL	SNCF; NS	DB; ÖBB	SNCF; CFL	FS
Current collector bar	Single collector	Double collector		Single collector	Single collector	
Contact strip width	1320 mm	1950 mm		1950 mm	1450 mm	

=== Service ===
With hindsight, the locomotives never operated scheduled services East of France and never required their fourth voltage ability. Although the Belgian derivative of this class, the Class 18, regularly operated into Germany.

Only for their final withdrawal in 1996, a special passenger service was operated into Germany and the 15 kV system. This was their only German service with paying passengers.

== Bogie design ==
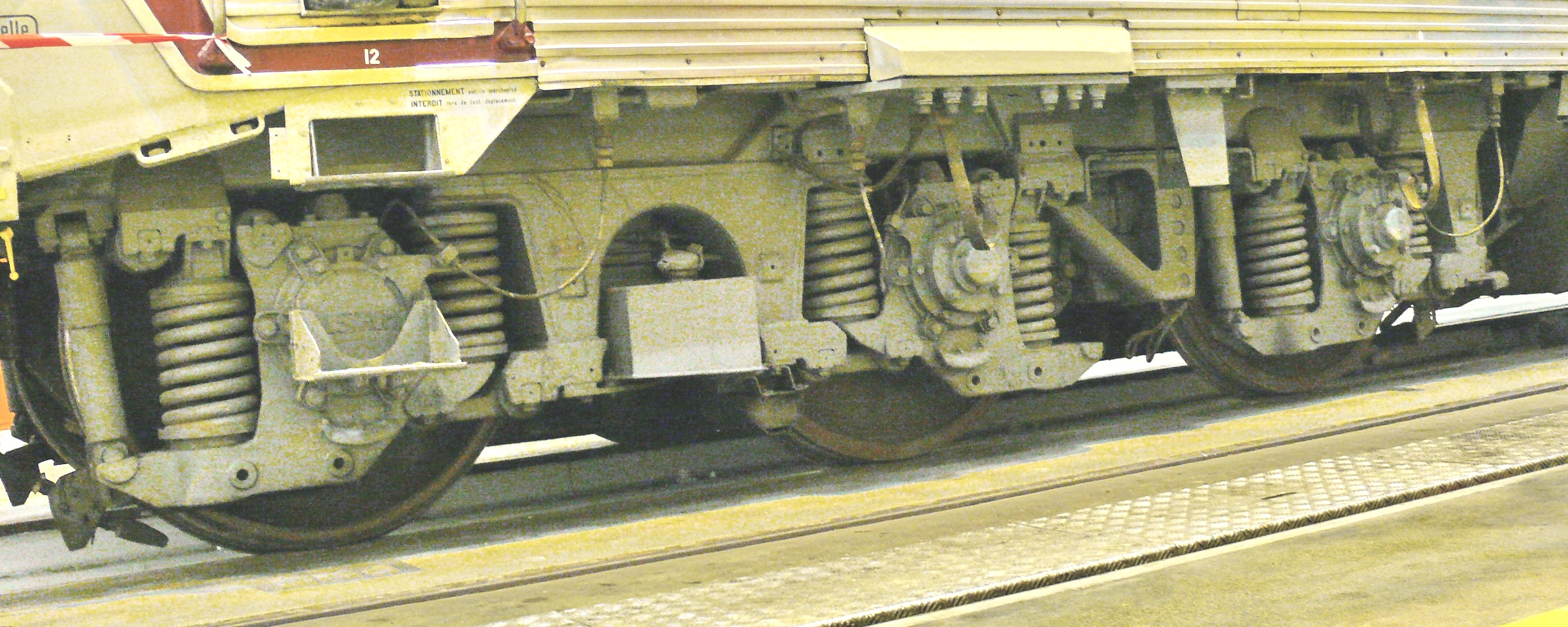

The weight of the quad voltage equipment required additional carrying axles, more than the typical French Bo′Bo′ layout of the time. Alsthom's B′B′ monomotor bogie has already been introduced by the 25 kV BB 16500 class of 1962 and was considered successful. These Alsthom-bogied B′B′ designs, such as the BB 8500 class, had not yet acquired their nickname of «Danseuses», owing to their poor stability at speed. A six-axle Co′Co′ though had not been built for a decade, since the record-breaking CC 7100 class of 1952.

Prototype C′C′ bogies were tested under the one-off CC 10002 (1962). This used the smaller 1,290 kW Alsthom TAO 646 traction motor with gear ratios of 85 kilometres per hour (50 mph) and 140 kilometres per hour (90 mph). The same bogie design was also used for the CC 70000 diesel-electric.

=== Gearing ===
The monomotor bogie had the ability to change the gear ratio between the motor and the wheels, allowing a mixed-traffic locomotive to operate for either high-speed passenger or freight services. This ratio could be selected by the driver, when the locomotive was stopped. For the CC 40100, this ability was not used and a depot fitter had to change them. The first four locomotives built were geared for 160 kilometres per hour (100 mph), the later ones for 180 kilometres per hour (110 mph). Although there had been plans to provide gearing for 220 kilometres per hour (140 mph), the running lines and their signalling were never upgraded to these speeds and so this gear ratio was never needed.

== Body design ==
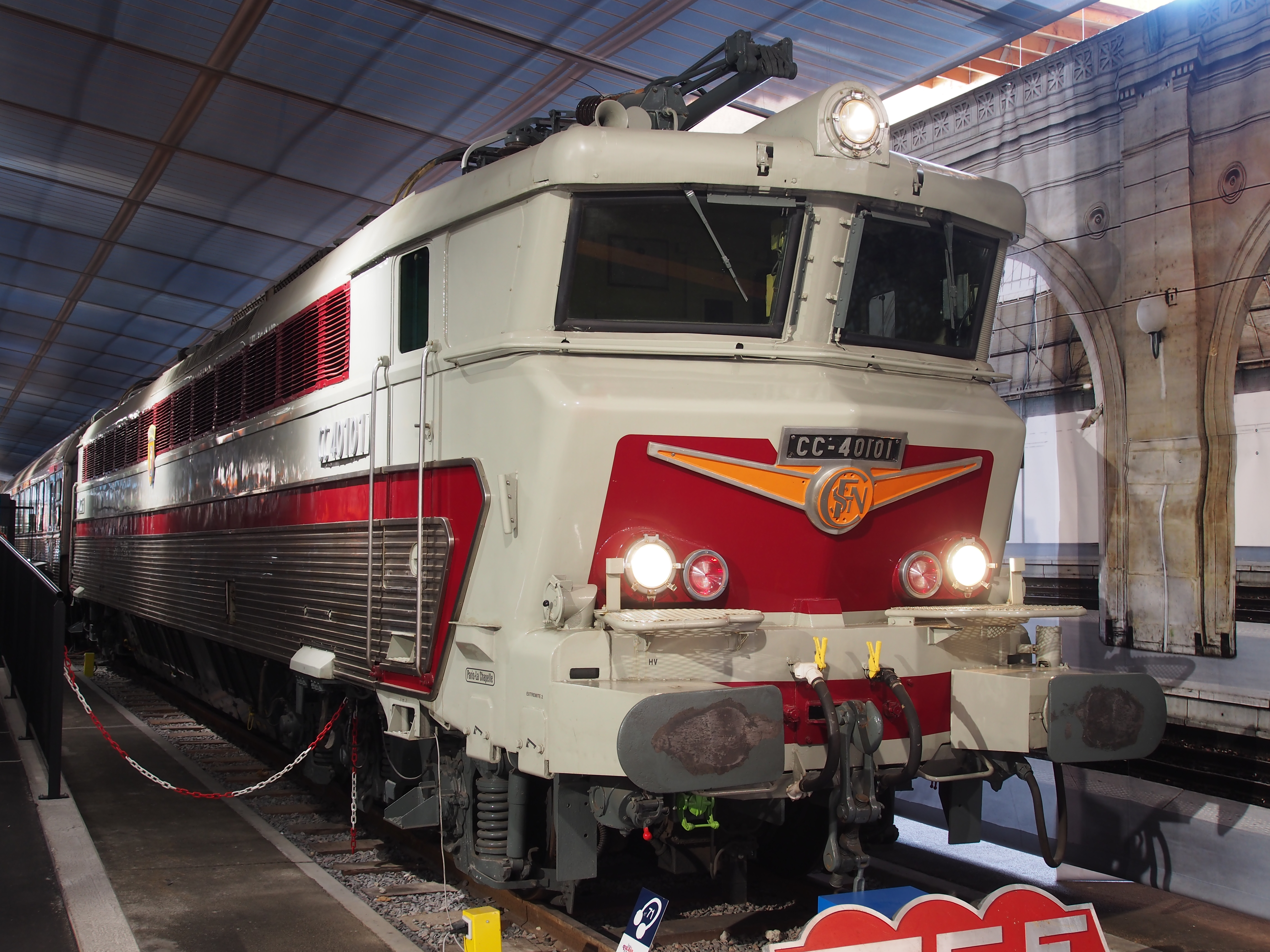

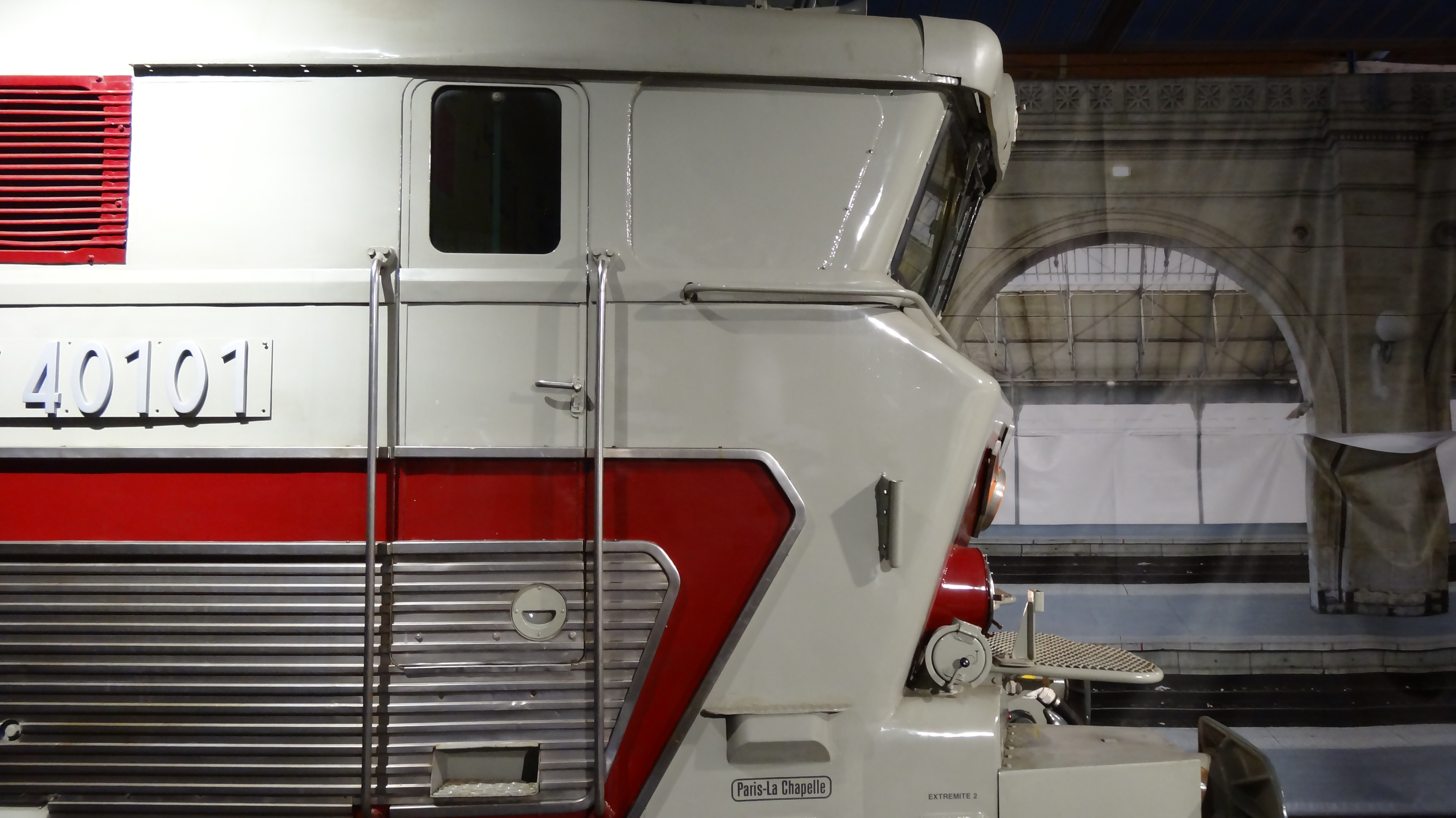
Side profile. Note the outline of the plated-over side window

The CC 40100 was the first of Paul Arzens' 'Nez Cassé' designs. These used distinctive forward-tilted windscreens, intended to reduce sun reflections. As an international locomotive, French practice was that a central third headlight was placed above the windscreens. For the CC 40100 class, the nose below was quite short and so the roofline overhung the nose. Later classes with this design style had a longer cellular bonnet ahead of the driver, which could act as a crumple zone in an accident.

When first built, the driver's cab had side windows. (Note: Visible in the l'Oiseau Bleu image at Brussels) In common with the other Nez Cassé designs, these were later plated over. Unlike the windscreen itself, these panels had been vertical and gave trouble with sun glare.

The sides of the locomotives were decorated with ribbed stainless steel panels, described as the 'Inox' (Note: 'Inoxidable' or 'Inox' are the common French terms for stainless steel.) livery. These panels were unique to this class amongst the Nez Cassé.

=== Coaches ===
For the Paris - Brussels - Amsterdam 'PBA' service, new coaching stock of the TEE PBA coaches design was built. This carried the same Inox livery as the locomotives, of ribbed stainless steel with a horizontal red stripe above the windows, labelled 'Trans Europe Express' in gold. Their design was based on the 1952 lightweight, luxury Vehicle DEV Inox, made from ribbed stainless according to the methods of the US Budd Company. Heating and air-conditioning power for these coaches relied on a head end power car.

In 1969 a further series of coaches based on the PBA design, the Voitures Mistral 1969, were constructed for services on PLM routes to southeast France.

Even for an all-first-class service, the passenger capacity was small and a large proportion of the train was given over to services. The basic train formation was of 6 coaches: one a compartment coach with 48 seats, two open-plan with a centre aisle and 2+1 seating giving 46 seats and two dining car and bar cars with 29 seats, for a total of 186 paying passenger seats. (Note: The bar car had 17 ticketed seats and 12 in the bar area itself) The last coach had only utility accommodation: 15 seats for train and customs staff, a baggage compartment and the air-conditioning generator set. The Amsterdam services were of 10 coaches, with a further 4 working through to Amsterdam. These were the 46 and 48 seat passenger coaches, another kitchen car and another baggage/generator car. The coaches had the then unusual feature of power-operated doors at each end, which reduced the seating from 48 to 46 for the centre-aisle stock, with 1+1 end seating to give sufficient space for the door.

== Use ==
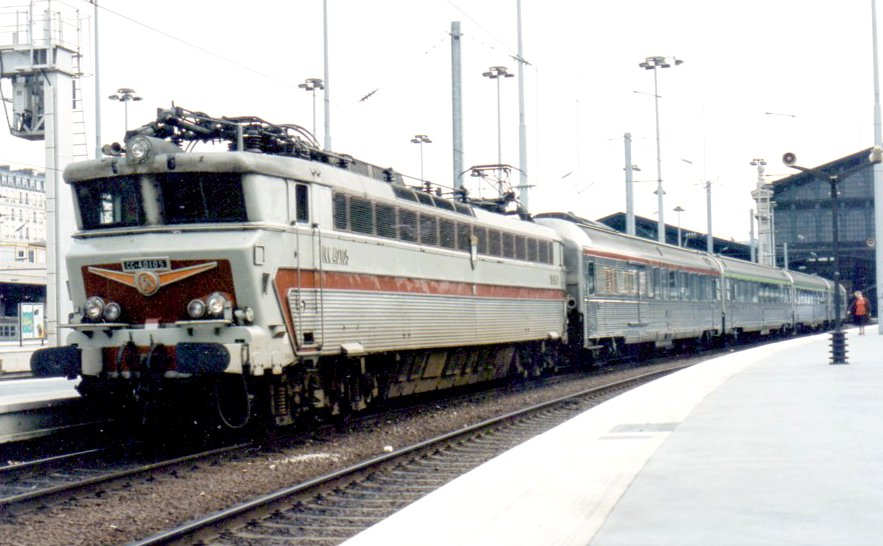
CC 40105 Hauling Étoile du Nord, 1979

- Trans Europ Express

- Île de France, Paris - Brussels - Amsterdam, from 31 May 1964.
- Brabant, Paris - Brussels, from 1974
- Étoile du Nord, Paris - Brussels - Amsterdam, from 2 August 1964.
- L'Oiseau Bleu, Paris - Brussels

The class performed well and provided a fast service on the PBA routes. However they were also considered complex, unreliable and expensive to maintain. In particular, the field weakening resistances had a tendency to overheating and fires.

== Accidents ==
In 1969, shortly after its delivery, Nº 40106 was destroyed by a collision with a truck on a level crossing near Lembeek in Belgium. In 1973 the six Belgian Class 18 were being built and an extra locomotive was built as a replacement for 40106 .

== Developments ==
SNCB

- Class 18, six near-identical locomotives were built for Belgium between 1973 and 1974. Unlike the CC 40100, these also worked into Germany and used their 15 kV systems.

== Withdrawal ==
The class had provided a good service but they were also judged to be insufficiently reliable and very expensive to maintain. TEE was replaced by EuroCity in the early 1990s and then the high-speed line of LGV Nord, operated by Thalys. These new services used the three-voltage TGV PBA and four-voltage PBKA for services into Germany and Cologne (German: Köln).

The last CC 40100 services were in the summer of 1996. A commemorative TEE Inox train trip was organized on the 1st and 2 June 1996, hauled by CC 40109 and 40110. This took the long PBA route, also with an incursion into Germany and the only use of the full quad-voltage abilities. On withdrawal on 3 June, the furthest travelled, CC 40104, had travelled 7,465,470 kilometres (4,638,830 mi).

=== Preservation ===
Three locomotives have been preserved:

- CC 40101: exhibited at the Cité du train in Mulhouse since 2010, after restoration by the Centre de la Mine et du Chemin de Fer at Oignies and storage at the Mohon roundhouse.
- CC 40109: originally at the Mulhouse Cité du train, in 2005 it was exchanged with CC 40101, and is preserved by the Centre de la Mine et du Chemin de Fer at Oignies.
- CC 40110: Owned by the Matériel Ferroviaire et patrimoine National (MFPN) and stored at Paris la Chapelle depot. Since 2010, classed as a historic monument. This is the only example preserved in working order and is still used for special trains.

== Fleet list ==
All members of the class received names, chiefly of French communes, towns and cities.

Number	Name	Number	Name
CC 40101	Perpignan	CC 40106	Compiègne
CC 40102	Menton	CC 40107	Bayonne
CC 40103	Brioude	CC 40108	Hendaye
CC 40104	Saint-Jean-de-Luz	CC 40109	Cannes
CC 40105	Hyères	CC 40110	Nice

== See also ==
- SBB RAe TEE II, five 1961 Swiss quad-voltage electric multiple unit trainsets, built for TEE services
