= SNCF Class BB 20100 =

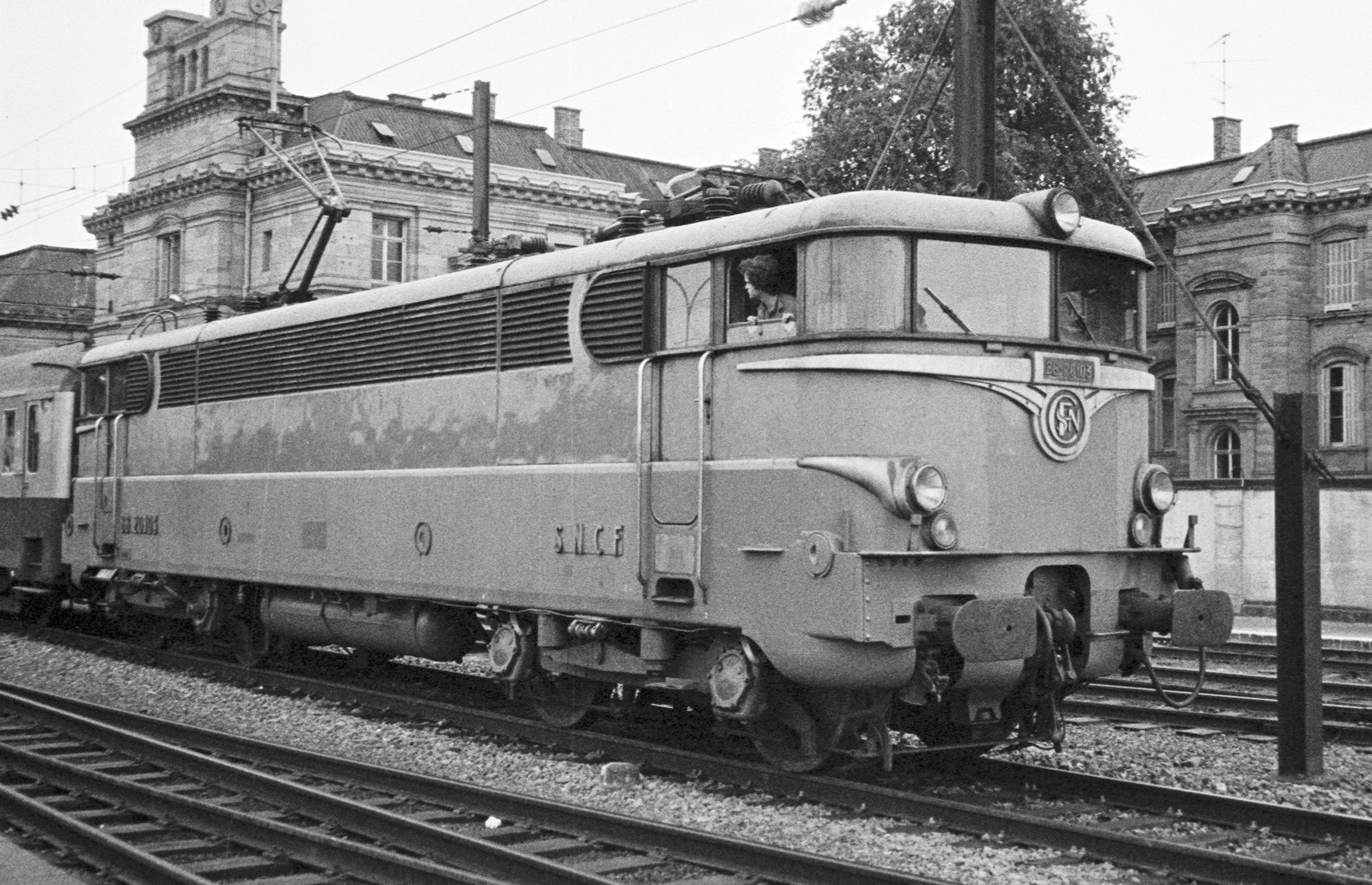
- BB 20103 at Strasbourg in 1974
Type and origin
- Power type: Electric
- Builder: SLM–Oerlikon (20101-20102); SLM-BBC-CEM-SW (20103-20104)
- Build date: 1958
- Total produced: 4
Specifications
- Configuration
  - AAR: B-B
  - UIC: Bo'Bo'
  - Commonwealth: Bo-Bo
- Gauge: 1,435 mm (4 ft 8 1/2 in)
- Length: 16.2 m (53 ft)
- Loco weight: 84 t (83 long tons; 93 short tons)
- Power supply: 25 kV-50 Hz; 15 kV-16 2/3 Hz
- Electric system/s: Catenary
- Current pickup(s): Pantograph
- Traction motors: 4 (BB 20201–BB 20202); 2 (BB 20103–BB20104
Performance figures
- Maximum speed: 160 km/h (99 mph)
- Power output: (20101-2 under 25 kV) 3140 kW; (20101-2 under 15 kV) 3000 kW; (20103-4 under 25 kV) 3590 kW; (20103-4 Under 15 kV) 2885 kW
Career
- Operators: SNCF
- Class: BB 20100
- Number in class: 4
- Numbers: BB 30001–BB 30004 (1958–1961); BB 20101–BB 20104 (1961 on)
- Withdrawn: 1973, 1982

The BB 20100 was a small class of two groups of two dual voltage electric locomotives of SNCF intended for cross-border traffic between France, Switzerland and Germany.

The delivery of locomotives, built in Switzerland, took place in 1958, but they lacked reliability. Providing only modest services over short distances and subject to numerous breakdowns, they were supplanted by more successful classes. Two were withdrawn in 1973, the other two in 1982.

== Genesis of locomotives ==
At the beginning of the 1950s, following the progressive electrification of the lines of the eastern network of France, and of the northern network of Switzerland, the Swiss Federal Railways wanted to eliminate the use of steam engines for cross-border traffic between Mulhouse and Basel. To do this, it was necessary to design dual-frequency electric locomotives capable of operating under two different power supplies, single-phase AC 25 kV-50 Hz in France and single-phase AC 15 kV-16 2/3 Hz in Switzerland as well as in Germany.

Funding, design and construction were shared through negotiated agreements. Switzerland granted France financial loans for infrastructure works related to electrification and, in return, France ordered the locomotives from the Swiss railway industry. The order was placed in April 1955 with the locomotives being allocated the provisional running numbers BB 26001–BB 26004. On delivery of the four locomotives, in 1958, they were finally numbered BB 30001 to BB 30004.

== Description ==
The bodies and the mechanical parts were made by SLM-Winterthur and were based on the BB 9200 built by the French manufacturer, MTE. An alternative design, not proceeded with, would have used the same body as BB 9003–9004. They were painted in the same bluish green livery (livré verte) as the BB 9200. Intended for cross-border traffic, they were equipped with a third front headlight on the occasion of an early overhaul; at the same time, and as for the other locomotives using the same body, red lights were added, while the side louvres, originally short as on the BB 9200, were lengthened as on the BB 16000s.

The bogies and motors differed according to the manufacturer of the electrical equipment:

- BB 30001 and 30002, whose electrical equipment was supplied by Oerlikon, had four motors using single-phase alternating current at the output of the transformer, similar to the SNCF Class BB 13000, with Jacquemin bogies.
- The equipment of BB 30003 and 30004 came from Brown-Boveri; the locomotives had short-wheelbase single-motor bogies using direct current motors, powered by single-phase alternating current rectified by excitrons at the output of the transformer, similar to that of the SNCF Class BB 16500.

In 1961, these four locomotives were renumbered BB 20101 to 20104, in the section reserved for AC dual-voltage locomotives, according to SNCF's new numbering system. (Note: In 1961–63, the two locomotives of the BB 30000 class, cosmetically similar to the BB 9400 but able to run under three different voltages, were numbered BB 30001 and BB 30002, responding to a new version of the numbering rules for tri-voltage stock..)

== Career ==
=== Operation ===
These locomotives were used on the cross-border link between Mulhouse and Basel from 1958, departing from Strasbourg or Thionville. They also reached Luxembourg, for the haulage of passenger trains and express goods trains. Being prototypes of uncertain reliability, the four BB 20100 were never simultaneously in service, at least one locomotive was always available to ensure a back-up in the event of a failure. However, the increase in cross-border freight traffic required SNCF to acquire additional dual-voltage locomotives to ensure services between Saint-Louis and Bâle-Muttenz marshalling yards. In consultation with the SBB, this resulted in the order of the Swiss built C 20150s. As a result, the BB 20100 were freed from part of their tasks.

From 1966, they were used on the cross-border link between Strasbourg and Kehl, which had just been electrified. However the BB 20100 at the head of the inaugural train failed during the trip. To cope with the heavy traffic on the Franco-German axis, the SNCF acquired new dual-frequency machines, the BB 20200 built by Alsthom, a dual-voltage version of the BB 17000. Thirteen locomotives were delivered in 1970. They were much more reliable and powerful than the earlier class. The CC 20150 were returned to SBB/CFF in 1971 and the BB 20100 saw their operations restricted to the vicinity of Strasbourg and Mulhouse. BB 20102 and 20104 were withdrawn and scrapped in 1973; parts of BB 20104 were recovered to be reused on the remaining members of the class. BB 20101, which was latterly only used to preheat passenger trains at Strasbourg station, and BB 20103, which had been damaged in a fire at Igney-Avricourt station, were struck off in 1982. None of the class have been preserved.

=== Routes ===
- Strasbourg – Bâle-CFF on international services
- Luxembourg – Thionville – Bâle-CFF on international services
- St-Louis marshalling yard – Bâle-Muttenz marshalling yard on freight services
- Strasbourg – Kehl on international services
- Hausbergen marshalling yard – Blainville marshalling yard on freight services

=== Depot allocation ===
From their entry into service to their withdrawal, the locomotives were assigned to Strasbourg.
