= Belgian Railways Class 18 (Alsthom) =

Locomotive class of 6 Belgian electric locomotives built by Alsthom in 1973–1974

Class 18
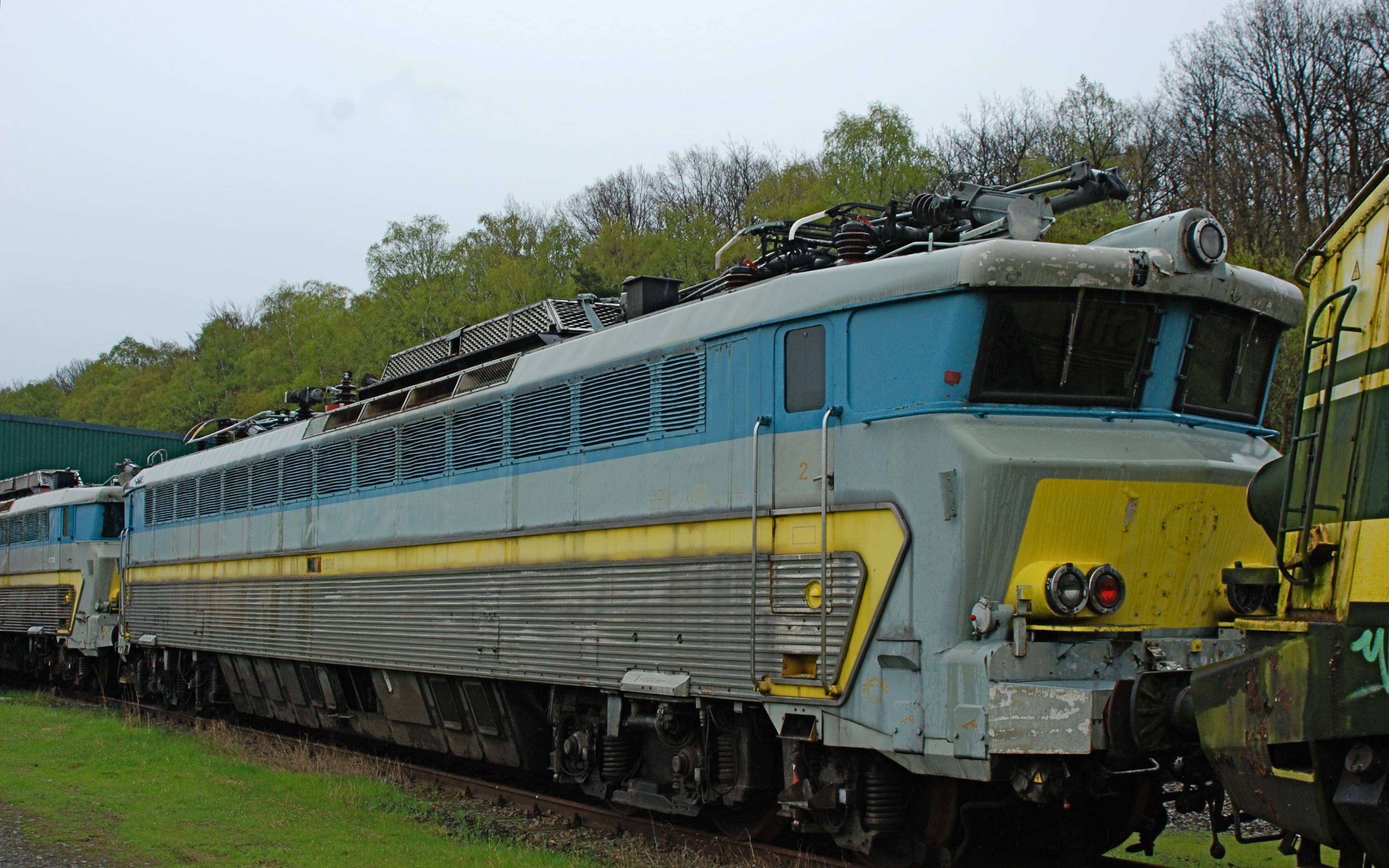
- 1803 and 1806 at Raeren after withdrawal
Type and origin
- Power type: Electric
- Builder: Alsthom
- Build date: 1973–1974
- Total produced: 6
Specifications
- Configuration
  - UIC: C′C′
- Gauge: 1,435 mm (4 ft 8 1/2 in) standard gauge
- Driver dia.: 1,100 mm (3 ft 7.31 in)
- Length: 22.08 m (72 ft 5 in)
- Height: 4,220 mm (13 ft 10 in)
- Loco weight: 113 tonnes (111.22 long tons; 124.56 short tons)
- Electric system/s: 1500 V DC; 3000 V DC; 25 kV 50 Hz AC; 15 kV 16 2/3 Hz AC
- Current pickup: Pantograph
Performance figures
- Maximum speed: 180 km/h (112 mph)
- Power output: 4,320 kW (5,790 hp)
- Tractive effort: 196 kN (44,000 lbf)
Career
- Operators: NMBS/SNCB
- Class: 18
- First run: 1973
- Last run: 1999
- Retired: 1997–1999
- Scrapped: 2008–2012
- Disposition: 1805 preserved, others scrapped

The Belgian Railways Class 18 was a type of electric locomotive operated by NMBS/SNCB of Belgium. Six locomotives of this type entered service between 1973 and 1974. They were derived from the French SNCF CC 40100 express passenger locomotives. Their multi-voltage capabilities allowed them to work beyond Belgium's borders, mainly Paris - Brussels/Liège and Oostende - Cologne. The locomotives were all retired from service by 1999. Class 18 has been displaced from these assignments by Thalys electric multiple units.

The locomotives had an aluminum body with dark blue accents, later repainted with teal and yellow accents.

Since 2009, the locomotive numbers from 1801 onwards have been in use by the new Siemens NMBS/SNCB Class 18 locomotives.

== Status ==
The dispositions of locomotives in this class are as follows:

- 1801 Scrapped in February 2008 at Salzinnes works
- 1802 Stored at Kinkempois, scrapped in July 2009 at Courcelles-Motte
- 1803 Stored at Raeren, moved to Sokolov, Czech Republic in October 2011 and scrapped in February 2012
- 1804 Stored at Kinkempois, scrapped in July 2009 at Courcelles-Motte
- 1805 Preserved by PFT in Saint-Ghislain
- 1806 Stored at Raeren, moved to Sokolov, Czech Republic in October 2011 and scrapped in February 2012
