= SNCF Class BB 69000 =

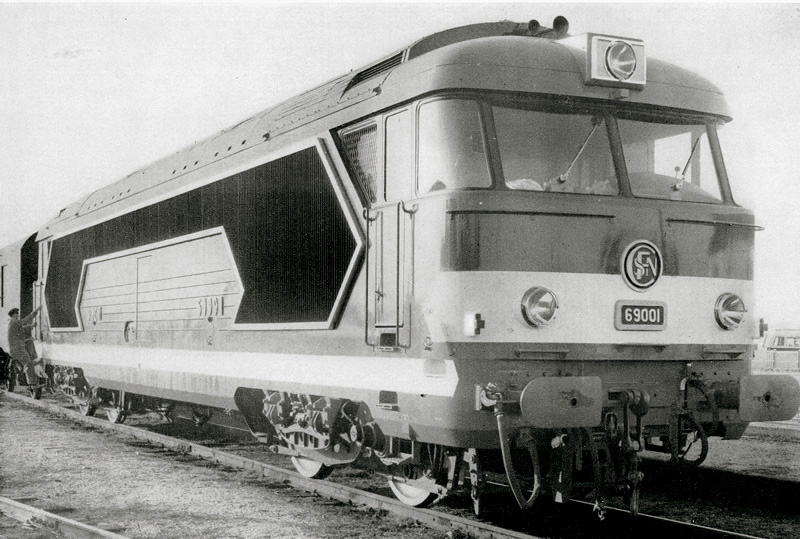
Type and origin
- Power type: diesel
- Builder: Schneider-SEMT
- Build date: 1964
- Total produced: 2
Specifications
- Configuration
  - UIC: B′B′
- Gauge: 1,435 mm (4 ft 8 1/2 in) standard gauge
- Length: 19 m (62 ft 4 in)
- Loco weight: 84 t (83 long tons; 93 short tons)
- Fuel type: Diesel
- Prime mover: Two SEMT Pielstick 16PA4
- Engine type: V16 diesel
- Cylinders: V16
- Transmission: Hydraulic
Performance figures
- Maximum speed: 140 km/h (87 mph)
- Power output: 2,620 kW (3,510 hp)
Career
- Operators: SNCF

SNCF BB 69000 were a pair of two prototype high-power diesel-hydraulic locomotives, numbered BB 69001 and BB 69002. They were built at the same time, and for comparison with, as a diesel-electric version, CC 70000. The use of hydraulic transmission saved 30 tons in weight and enabled the locomotives to run on four axles instead of the six axles of the diesel-electric.

These locos should not be confused with the BB 69200 which were rebuilds of the BB 66000.

== Design ==
From 1959, the SNCF had identified a need for high-power mixed-traffic diesel locomotives of around 4,000 hp. Matériel de Traction Electrique (MTE), a joint venture between Jeumont-Schneider and Creusot-Loire, began work on a suitable design. Alsthom also started work on a diesel-electric with the same engines, which would become the CC 70000.

== Powertrain ==
There were two diesel engine prime movers and each drove one bogie through a hydraulic transmission. Past experience led MTE to place the transmission units directly on the bogies: cardan shafts led from the engine to the transmission, which unusually was mounted transversely, and the transmissions were geared to the typically French monomotor bogie. The transmissions used were Voith L821gr, These had two torque converters and a fluid coupling. The first torque converter was scoop-controlled and was only fully filled for starting. For efficiency, high-speed running used a coupling. A 500 hp hydraulic retarder was also considered, although not initially installed, and this would be used for long descents.

Cooling

Each engine had a separate cooling group mounted in the side panels with a pair of cooling fans in the roof. These had three separate circuits: high-temperature engine cooling water, medium-temperature cooling water and engine oil. An oil-water heat exchanger cooled the transmission oil.
