= SNCF Class BB 8500 =

French electric locomotive

Class BB 8500
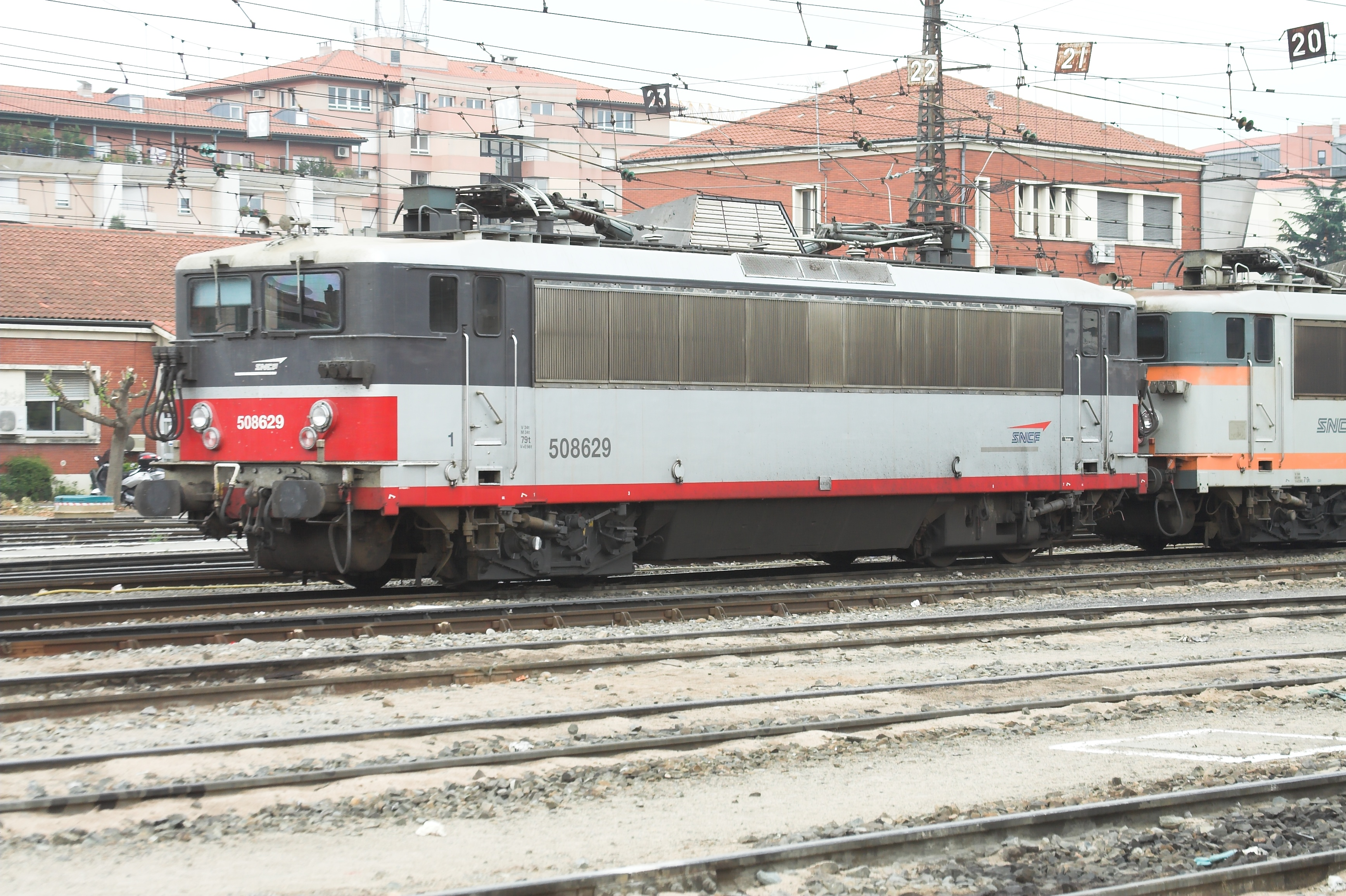
- SNCF BB 8629 at Matabiau Station, Toulouse (2006-07-05)
Type and origin
- Power type: Electric
- Builder: Alstom
- Build date: 1964–1974
- Total produced: 146
Specifications
- Configuration
  - UIC: B'B'
- Gauge: 1,435 mm (4 ft 8 1/2 in)
- Driver dia.: 1,100 mm (43.31 in)
- Length: 14.70 m (48 ft 2.7 in) (8501-8536); 14.94 m (49 ft 0.2 in) (8537-8587); 15.57 m (51 ft 1.0 in)(8588-8646)
- Loco weight: 78 t (77 long tons; 86 short tons) (8501-8536); 79 t (78 long tons; 87 short tons) (8537-8587); 80 t (79 long tons; 88 short tons) (8588-8646)
- Electric system/s: 1.5 kV DC Catenary
- Current pickup: Pantograph
- Traction motors: 2×660 TAB A1 (8501-8536) or 2×TAB 660B1 (8537-8646) monomotors
Performance figures
- Maximum speed: 100 or 140 km/h (62 or 87 mph)
- Power output: 2,610 kW (3,500 hp) (8501-8536); 2,940 kW (3,940 hp) (8537-8646)
- Tractive effort: 323 or 197 kN (72,600 or 44,300 lb_{f})
Career
- Operators: SNCF VFE*; SNCF TER†; SNCF Transilien‡ SNCF Infra¤
- Class: ¤BB 8500 †‡BB 8500 & BB88500
- Number in class: 2 †43 ‡4 ¤2
- Nicknames: Danseuses (Dancers)
- Locale: Tournay-Capvern †TER Bourgogne, Midi-Pyrénées, Languedoc & Rhône-Alpes. ECS at Paris-Gare de Lyon, Paris-Gare d'Austerlitz & Lyon
- Disposition: Banking engine ‡¤to be passed to TER

The SNCF Class BB 8500 class are part of a series of electric locomotives built by Alsthom for SNCF. They are the direct current version of the 25 kV alternating current SNCF BB 17000 and dual system SNCF BB 25500.

The locomotives are fitted with monomotor bogies with two different gear ratios. This allows them to increase their tractive effort in exchange for a reduction in their top speed. This makes them suitable for both freight and passenger trains. They acquired the nickname Danseuses (dancers) due to their tendency to sway from side to side at speed, which led to them being blacked at a number of depots.

They were built in three distinct batches, leading to detail differences. They remain in use as mixed traffic locomotives, mostly with TER and but with some remaining for special duties. Thirty locomotives, dedicated to empty stock moves, have been reclassified as BB 88500. Likewise in 2001, 20 of the class were rebuilt for freight banking workings on the Maurienne line. They were classified as BB 8700 for this period.

== Names ==
Five members of the class were named.

Number	Name
8600	Fleury-les-Aubrey
8602	Foix
8603	Lannemezan
8604	Cerdagne
8605	Saint-Gaudens

== Preservation ==
A single locomotive, BB 8616, is preserved at Mohon.
