= SNCF Class BB 25500 =

Locomotive

Class BB 25500
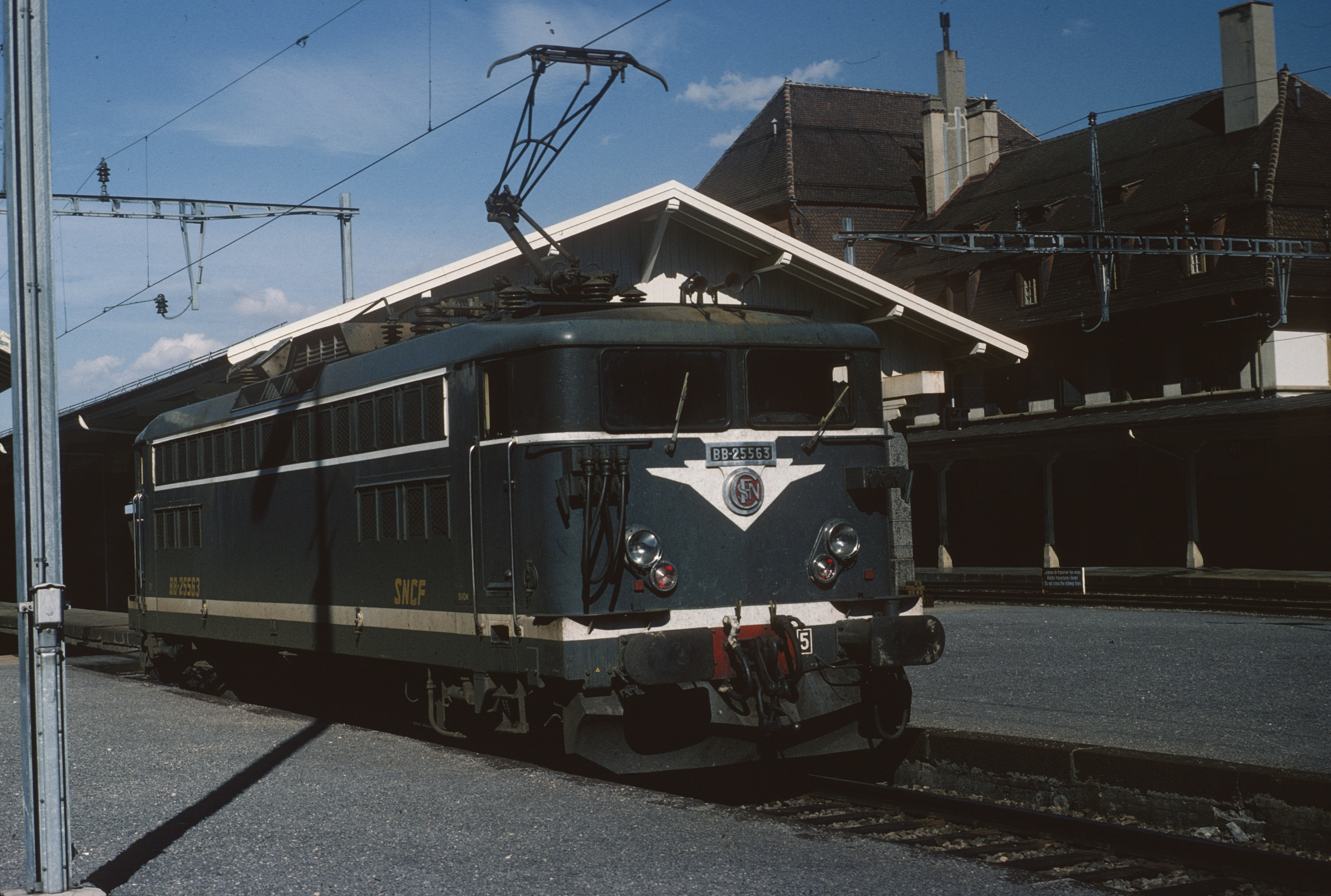
- SNCF BB 25563 at Geneva in 1976
Type and origin
- Power type: Electric
- Builder: Alsthom
- Build date: 1964–1976
- Total produced: 194
Specifications
- Configuration
  - UIC: B′B′
- Gauge: 1,435 mm (4 ft 8 1/2 in) standard gauge
- Driver dia.: 1,100 mm (3 ft 7 in)
- Length: 25501–25544: 14.7 m (48 ft 3 in); 25545–25587: 14.94 m (49 ft 0 in); 25588–25694: 15.57 m (51 ft 1 in)
- Loco weight: 25501–25544: 79 t (174,000 lb); 25545–25555: 80 t (180,000 lb); 25556–25694: 77 t (170,000 lb)
- Electric system/s: Overhead line: 25 kV 50 Hz AC; 1,500 V DC
- Current pickup: Pantograph
- Traction motors: 2×TAB 660B1 monomotors
Performance figures
- Maximum speed: 100 or 140 km/h (62 or 87 mph)
- Power output: 2,940 kW (3,940 hp)
- Tractive effort: 330 kN (74,200 lbf) or 197 kN (44,300 lbf)
Career
- Operators: SNCF TER/Transilien
- Class: BB 25500
- Number in class: TER: 102; Transilien: 8
- Locale: TER: Bourgogne, Bretagne, Franche-Comté, PACA, Rhône-Alpes; Transilien:Paris Montparnasse - Dreux/Mantes la Jolie
- First run: 4 June 1964
- Last run: 13 January 2021

SNCF's BB 25500 class are part of a series of electric locomotives built by Alsthom. They are the dual system version of the BB 17000 (AC) and BB 8500 (DC) locomotives (17000+8500=25500). They are fitted with monomotor bogies with two different gear ratios. This allows them to have either increased tractive effort for freight, or a higher top speed. This makes them suitable for both freight and passenger trains.

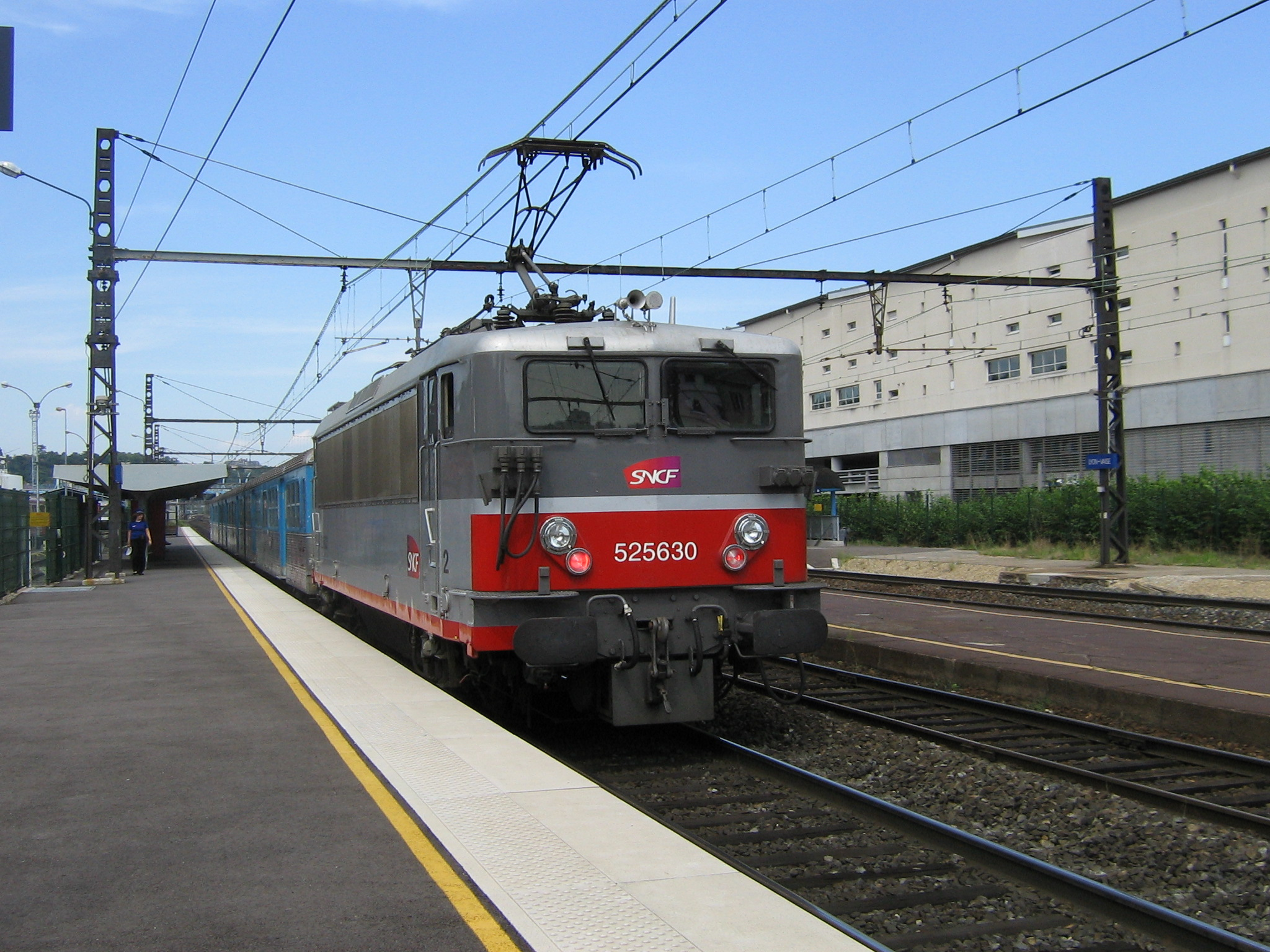
525630 pushes a push-pull train at Lyon Vaise in 2008

They were built in three distinct batches leading to detail differences. They remain in use as mixed traffic locomotives, mostly with TER and Transilien.

== Romania ==
Ten locomotives (25517, 25518, 25523, 25524, 25528, 25536, 25570, 25572, 25576 and 25581) have been exported to Romania. They work with former SNCF Rio carriages for Regio Călători.

Unfortunately, 25536 caught fire on 5 December 2017 at Cața station whilst hauling a freight train.

Services worked are:

- Brașov - Bucharest
- Brașov - Bucharest - Constanţa (Summer)

The locomotives have been renumbered by adding 400,000 to their SNCF numbers.

== Preservation ==
Locomotive 25609 is on preservation in Cité du Train in Mulhouse and is on display.
