= Monomotor =

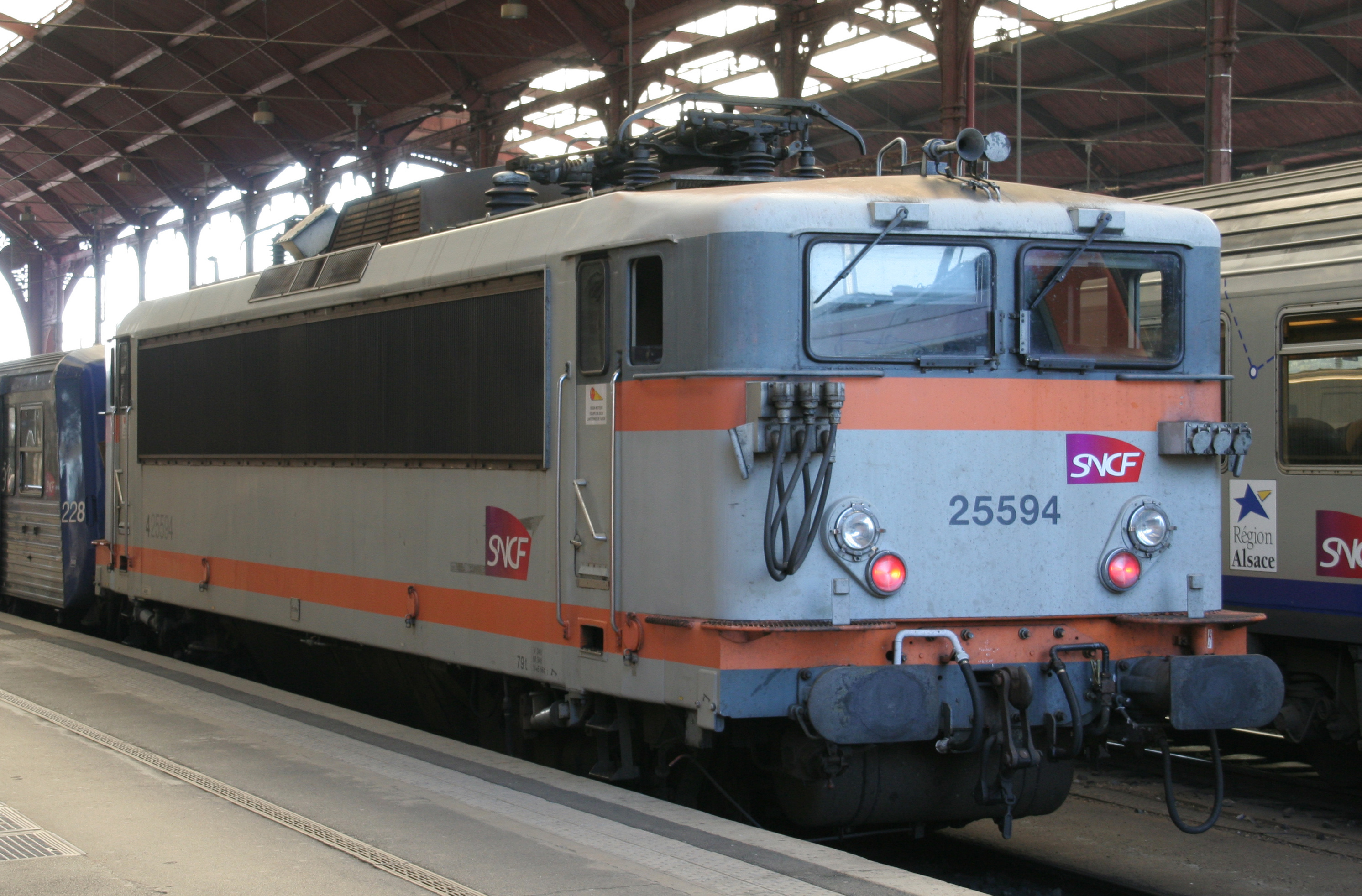
SNCF Class BB 25500 electric locomotive at Strasbourg. This locomotive has monomotor bogies and two-speed gearing

A monomotor is a train design where a single traction motor powers two or three axles in the same bogie. Conventional bogie design involves either having one motor for each axle, or having one or more axles unpowered. The monomotor design causes the motor to give both axles the same number of revolutions per minute.

== Advantages ==
The monomotor design makes it relatively easy to fit a locomotive with two-speed gearing. Low gear is used when hauling freight trains and high gear is used when hauling express passenger trains.

== Potential problems ==
When both axle's wheels are equally worn, this gives good operating conditions but, as soon as one of the wheels becomes slightly more worn (as is inevitable with steel wheels on steel rails), there will be slippage which causes wear and waste of energy. The problem can be countered by keeping the wheels regularly ground to the same diameter.
