= Monomotor bogie =

A monomotor bogie (French: bogie monomoteur) is a form of traction bogie used for an electric locomotive or diesel-electric locomotive. It is distinguished by having a single traction motor on each bogie.

== Development ==
The first electric locomotives used large-diameter electric motors, mounted rigidly on their frames and using jackshaft drives and coupling rods to carry their torque to the driving wheels. This increased their unsprung weight and limited their maximum speed, despite the greater power of electric locomotives.

=== Leading trucks ===
To achieve a higher speed, locomotives began using wheel arrangements such as 2'Do2' (AAR: 2-Do-2), with the SNCF Class 2D2 5500 This used leading (and trailing) pony trucks or bogies to provide stability at high speed, with individual traction motors for each axle, avoiding the weight of the coupling rods. Suspension travel for each axle was achieved with a Buchli drive on each axle. Unlike the original Swiss practice with a Buchli drive on one end of the axle, the French locomotives used a double-ended drive. This was later given as a reason for the low wear rates experienced with them. These locomotives first appeared during the 1930s with the 2D2 5500, and later during the post-war push for electrification the SNCF Class 2D2 9100 (1950).

=== Bogies ===
Shortly after the 9100 class, the French absorbed another new Swiss idea, that of the high-speed double-bogie locomotive. Previous French Bo-Bo locomotives had been considered suitable only for medium speeds, with the pony truck and rigid frame used for express passenger service. The Swiss Re 4/4^{I} of 1946 achieved speeds of up to 125 kilometres per hour (78 mph), owing to the advanced design of its bogies.

New classes were built for French railways, embodying these principles. Two 1,500 V DC prototype Co-Co locomotives for the SNCF Class CC 7100 (1952) were built by Alstom, the first prototypes being tested from 1949. These locomotives had conventional per-axle traction motors. During tests in 1954 they achieved extremely high test speeds of 300 kilometres per hour (190 mph), which have not yet been surpassed by locomotive-hauled trains. (Note: Most records since have been set by railcar stock, rather than locomotive hauled.)

=== Monomotor bogies ===
SNCF Class BB 9003 SNCF Class BB 16500 (1962) SNCF Class BB 7200 (1967)

This was the first of the 'Nez Cassé' designs, by Paul Arzens.

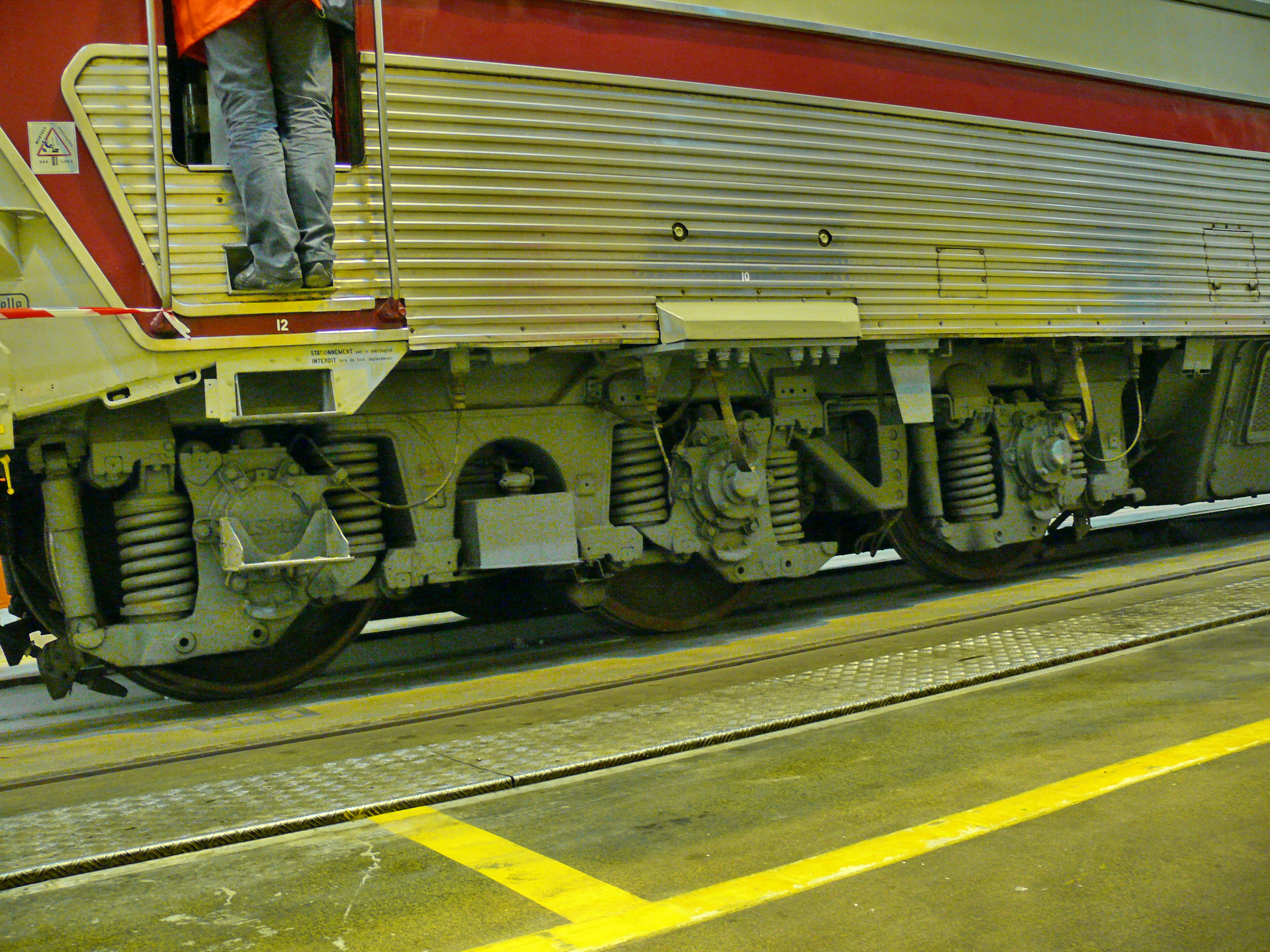
Three-axle C'bogie of CC 40110

Class CC 40100 (1964), a large quad-voltage locomotive, requiring a C'C' layout with three axle bogies.

== Use ==
Monomotor bogies are widely used in France, for designs by Alstom.

They were a particular feature of the 'Nez Cassé' family of locomotives, designed by Paul Arzens.

== Examples ==
- SNCF Class BB 7200 DC
- SNCF Class BB 15000 AC
- SNCF Class BB 22200 Dual-voltage, combining the attributes of both BB 7200 and BB 15000 (7200 + 15000 = 22200)
- SNCF Class BB 26000
- NS Class 1600 Dutch version of the SNCF Class BB 7200
- FS Class E.632 (Italian)

== Bibliography ==
- Hollingsworth, Brian; Cook, Arthur (2000). "E550 E". Modern Locomotives. ISBN 0-86288-351-2.
