= Tractive effort =

Pulling or pushing capability of a locomotive

In railway engineering, the term tractive effort describes the pulling or pushing capability of a locomotive. The published tractive force value for any vehicle may be theoretical—that is, calculated from known or implied mechanical properties—or obtained via testing under controlled conditions. The discussion herein covers the term's usage in mechanical applications in which the final stage of the power transmission system is one or more wheels in frictional contact with a railroad track.

== Defining tractive effort ==
The term tractive effort is often qualified as starting tractive effort, continuous tractive effort and maximum tractive effort. These terms apply to different operating conditions, but are related by common mechanical factors: input torque to the driving wheels, the wheel diameter, coefficient of friction (μ) between the driving wheels and supporting surface, and the weight applied to the driving wheels (mg). The product of μ and mg is the factor of adhesion, which determines the maximum torque that can be applied before the onset of wheelspin or wheelslip.

Starting tractive effort
Starting tractive effort is the tractive force that can be generated at a standstill. This figure is important on railways because it determines the maximum train weight that a locomotive can set into motion.
Maximum tractive effort
Maximum tractive effort is defined as the highest tractive force that can be generated under any condition that is not injurious to the vehicle or machine. In most cases, maximum tractive effort is developed at low speed and may be the same as the starting tractive effort.
Continuous tractive effort
Continuous tractive effort is the tractive force that can be maintained indefinitely, as distinct from the higher tractive effort that can be maintained for a limited period of time before the power transmission system overheats. Due to the relationship between power (P), velocity (v) and force (F), described as:

$P = vF$ or $\frac{P}{v} = F.$

Tractive effort inversely varies with speed at any given level of available power. Continuous tractive effort is often shown in graph form at a range of speeds as part of a tractive effort curve.

Vehicles having a hydrodynamic coupling, hydrodynamic torque multiplier or electric motor as part of the power transmission system may also have a maximum continuous tractive effort rating, which is the highest tractive force that can be produced for a short period of time without causing component harm. The period of time for which the maximum continuous tractive effort may be safely generated is usually limited by thermal considerations. such as temperature rise in a traction motor.

== Tractive effort curves ==
Specifications of locomotives often include tractive effort curves, showing the relationship between tractive effort and velocity.

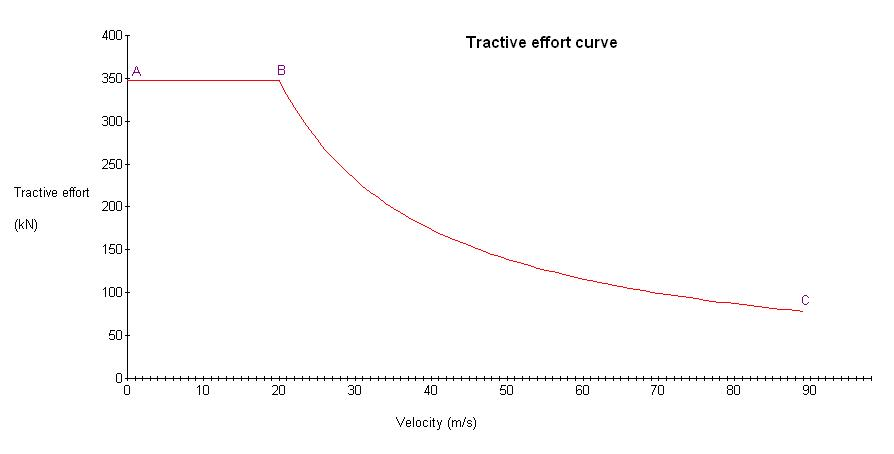
Diagram of tractive effort versus speed for a hypothetical locomotive with power at rail of ~7000 kW

The shape of the graph is shown at right. The line AB shows operation at the maximum tractive effort, the line BC shows continuous tractive effort that is inversely proportional to speed (constant power).

Tractive effort curves often have graphs of rolling resistance superimposed on them—the intersection of the rolling resistance graph (Note: The graphs typically show rolling resistance for standard train lengths or weights, on the level or on an uphill gradient) and tractive effort graph gives the maximum velocity at zero grade (when net tractive effort is zero).

== Rail vehicles ==
In order to start a train and accelerate it to a given speed, the locomotive(s) must develop sufficient tractive force to overcome the train's resistance, which is a combination of axle bearing friction, the friction of the wheels on the rails (which is substantially greater on curved track than on tangent track), and the force of gravity if on a grade. Once in motion, the train will develop additional drag as it accelerates due to aerodynamic forces, which increase with the square of the speed. Drag may also be produced at speed due to truck (bogie) hunting, which will increase the rolling friction between wheels and rails. If acceleration continues, the train will eventually attain a speed at which the available tractive force of the locomotive(s) will exactly offset the total drag, causing acceleration to cease. This top speed will be increased on a downgrade due to gravity assisting the motive power, and will be decreased on an upgrade due to gravity opposing the motive power.

Tractive effort can be theoretically calculated from a locomotive's mechanical characteristics (e.g., steam pressure, weight, etc.), or by actual testing with strain sensors on the drawbar and a dynamometer car. Power at rail is a railway term for the available power for traction, that is, the power that is available to propel the train.

=== Steam locomotives ===
An estimate for the tractive effort of a single cylinder steam locomotive can be obtained from the cylinder pressure, cylinder bore, stroke of the piston (Note: Half the stroke distance is about the same as the radial distance from the coupling of the driving rod to the centre of the driven wheel) and the diameter of the wheel. The torque developed by the linear motion of the piston depends on the angle that the driving rod makes with the tangent of the radius on the driving wheel. (Note: The relationship is: Torque = Force_{piston} x R (the radial distance to the point of connection of the driving rod) x cos(A), where A is the angle the driving rod makes with the tangent to the radius from wheel centre to driving rod attachment) For a more useful value an average value over the rotation of the wheel is used. The driving force is the torque divided by the wheel radius.

As an approximation, the following formula can be used (for a two-cylinder locomotive): (Note: As with any physical formula, units of measurement must be consistent: pressure in psi and lengths in inches give tractive effort in lbf, while pressure in Pa and lengths in metres give tractive effort in N.)

$\{t\}_\mathrm{lbf} = \frac {\{d\}_\mathrm{in}^2 \{s\}_\mathrm{in} \{p\}_\mathrm{psi}} {\{w\}_\mathrm{in}} \times 0.85,$

where

- t is tractive effort in pounds-force
- d is the piston diameter in inches (bore)
- s is the piston stroke in inches
- p is the working pressure in pounds per square inch
- w is the diameter of the driving wheels in inches

The constant 0.85 was the Association of American Railroads (AAR) standard for such calculations, and overestimated the efficiency of some locomotives and underestimated that of others. Modern locomotives with roller bearings were probably underestimated.

European designers used a constant of 0.6 instead of 0.85, so the two cannot be compared without a conversion factor. In Britain main-line railways generally used a constant of 0.85 but builders of industrial locomotives often used a lower figure, typically 0.75.

The constant c also depends on the cylinder dimensions and the time at which the steam inlet valves are open; if the steam inlet valves are closed immediately after obtaining full cylinder pressure the piston force can be expected to have dropped to less than half the initial force. (Note: See Gas laws for an explanation.) giving a low c value. If the cylinder valves are left open for longer the value of c will rise nearer to one.

Three or four cylinders (simple)

The result should be multiplied by 1.5 for a three-cylinder locomotive and by two for a four-cylinder locomotive.

Alternatively, tractive effort of all "simple" (i.e. non-compound) locomotives can be calculated thus:

$\{t\}_\mathrm{lbf} = \frac{0.85 \{d\}_\mathrm{in}^2 n \{s\}_\mathrm{in} \{p\}_\mathrm{psi}} {2 \{w\}_\mathrm{in}},$

where

- t is tractive effort in pounds-force
- n is the number of cylinders
- d is the piston diameter in inches
- s is the piston stroke in inches
- p is the maximum rated boiler pressure in psi
- w is the diameter of the driving wheels in inches

Multiple cylinders (compound)

For other numbers and combinations of cylinders, including double and triple expansion engines the tractive effort can be estimated by adding the tractive efforts due to the individual cylinders at their respective pressures and cylinder strokes. (Note: The value of the constant c for a low-pressure cylinder is taken to be 0.80 when the value for a high-pressure cylinder is taken to be 0.85)

==== Values and comparisons for steam locomotives ====
Tractive effort is the figure often quoted when comparing the powers of steam locomotives, but is misleading because tractive effort shows the ability to start a train, not the ability to haul it. Possibly the highest tractive effort ever claimed was for the Virginian Railway's 2-8-8-8-4 triplex locomotive, which in simple expansion mode had a calculated starting T.E. of 199,560 lbf (887.7 kN)—but the boiler could not produce enough steam to haul at speeds over 5 mph (8 km/h).

Of more successful steam locomotives, those with the highest rated starting tractive effort were the Virginian Railway AE-class 2-10-10-2s, at 176,000 lbf (783 kN) in simple-expansion mode (or 162,200 lb if calculated by the usual formula). The Union Pacific Big Boys had a starting T.E. of 135,375 lbf (602 kN); the Norfolk & Western's Y5, Y6, Y6a, and Y6b class 2-8-8-2s had a starting T.E. of 152,206 lbf (677 kN) in simple expansion mode (later modified to 170,000 lbf (756 kN), claim some enthusiasts); and the Pennsylvania Railroad's freight duplex Q2 attained 114,860 lbf (510.9 kN, including booster)—the highest for a rigid-framed locomotive. Later two-cylinder passenger locomotives were generally 40,000 to 80,000 lbf (170 to 350 kN) of T.E.

=== Diesel and electric locomotives ===
For an electric locomotive or a diesel-electric locomotive, starting tractive effort can be calculated from the amount of weight on the driving wheels (which may be less than the total locomotive weight in some cases), combined stall torque of the traction motors, the gear ratio between the traction motors and axles, and driving wheel diameter. For a diesel-hydraulic locomotive, the starting tractive effort is affected by the stall torque of the torque converter, as well as gearing, wheel diameter and locomotive weight.

The relationship between power and tractive effort was expressed by Hay (1978) as

$t = \frac{PE}{v},$

where

- t is tractive effort, in newtons (N)
- P is the power in watts (W)
- E is the efficiency, with a suggested value of 0.82 to account for losses between the motor and the rail, as well as power diverted to auxiliary systems such as lighting
- v is the speed in metres per second (m/s)

Freight locomotives are designed to produce higher maximum tractive effort than passenger units of equivalent power, necessitated by the much higher weight that is typical of a freight train. In modern locomotives, the gearing between the traction motors and axles is selected to suit the type of service in which the unit will be operated. As traction motors have a maximum speed at which they can rotate without incurring damage, gearing for higher tractive effort is at the expense of top speed. Conversely, the gearing used with passenger locomotives favors speed over maximum tractive effort.

Electric locomotives with monomotor bogies are sometimes fitted with two-speed gearing. This allows higher tractive effort for hauling freight trains but at reduced speed. Examples include the SNCF classes BB 8500 and BB 25500.

== See also ==
- Braking
- Drag equation
- Factor of adhesion, which is simply the weight on the locomotive's driving wheels divided by the starting tractive effort
- Power classification – British Railways and London, Midland and Scottish railway classification scheme
- Rail adhesion
- Tractor pulling, bollard pull – articles relating to tractive effort for other forms of vehicle
