= SNCF Class BB 17000 =

French electric locomotives

SNCF BB 17000
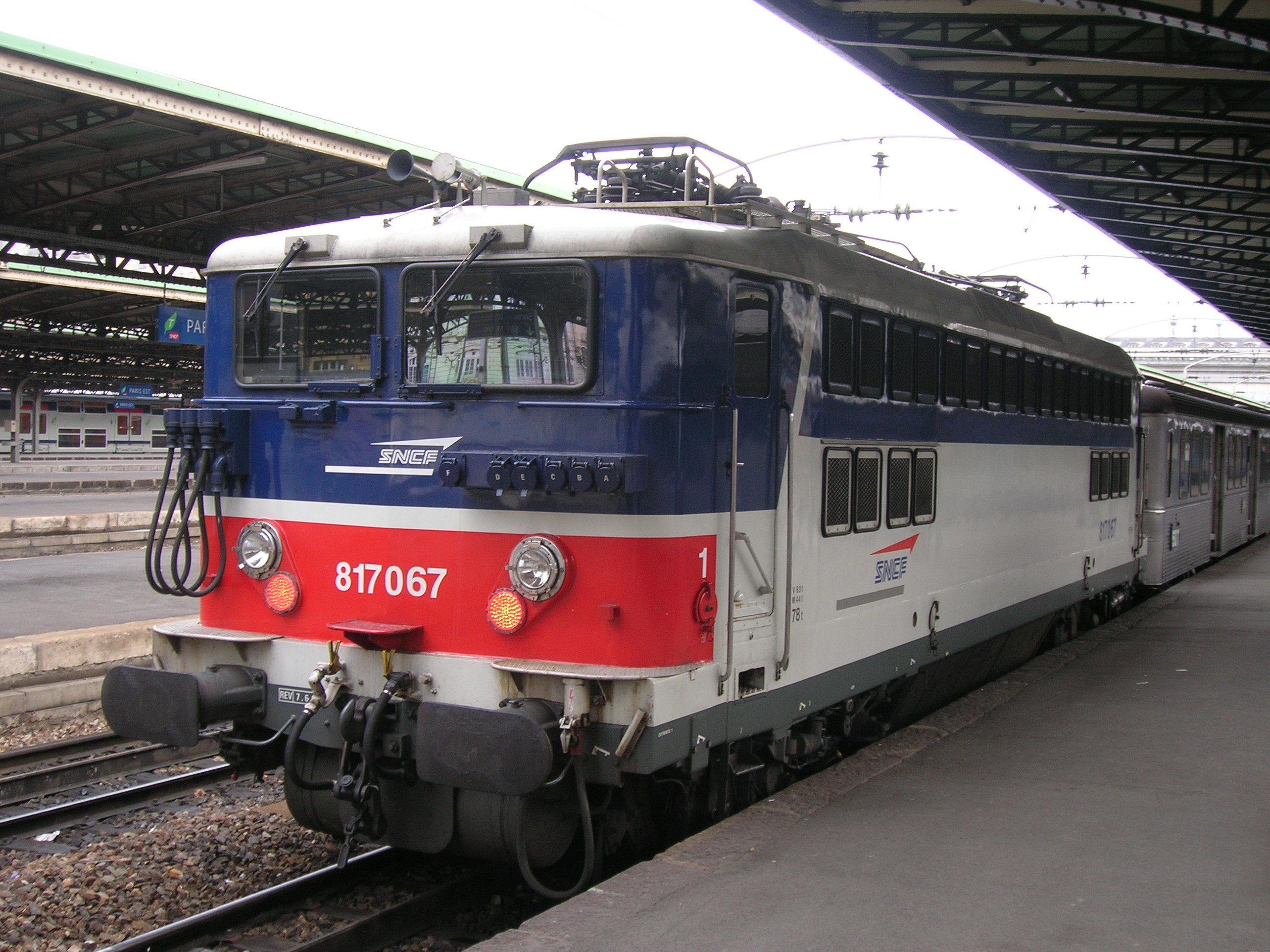
- BB 17067 at Gare de l'Est 26 December 2005
Type and origin
- Power type: Electric
- Builder: Alsthom
- Build date: 1965–1968
- Total produced: 105
Specifications
- Configuration
  - UIC: B′B′
- Gauge: 1,435 mm (4 ft 8 1/2 in)
- Wheel diameter: 1,100 mm (3 ft 7 1/4 in)
- Wheelbase: 8.500 m (27 ft 10 5/8 in)
  - Bogie: 1.608 m (5 ft 3 1/4 in)
- Length: 14.7–15.57 m (48 ft 2 3/4 in – 51 ft 1 in)
- Width: 3.03 or 3.038 m (9 ft 11 1/4 in or 9 ft 11 5/8 in)
- Height: 4.19 m (13 ft 9 in)
- Loco weight: 78–79 tonnes (77–78 long tons; 86–87 short tons)
- Electric system/s: 25 kV 50 Hz AC
- Current pickup(s): Pantograph
- Traction motors: TAB 660 B1, force ventilated, 1.5 kilovolt
Performance figures
- Maximum speed: 90 or 140 km/h (56 or 87 mph)
- Power output
  - Continuous: 2,940 kW (3,940 hp)
Career
- Operators: SNCF
- Numbers: BB 17001 – BB 17105
- Nicknames: Danseuses (Dancers)

The SNCF Class BB 17000 B-B was a class of AC electric locomotives built between 1965 and 1968. The class was used for suburban duties on railway lines around Paris, notably powering VB2N push-pull sets. They were monophase locomotives (running off 25 kV AC overhead supply) and had the nickname "danseuses" or "dancers". By 2020 the 105-strong class of locomotives had all been withdrawn.

One member of the class had been named, BB 17051 Cormeilles-en-Parisis.

== Service ==
After spending a varied first part of their careers hauling different types of train, the locomotives were regrouped for use on the Parisian "trains de la banlieue" or suburban trains. They were all owned and operated by Transilien.
