= SNCF Class BB 75000 =

Class of 400 French diesel-electric locomotives

BB 75000
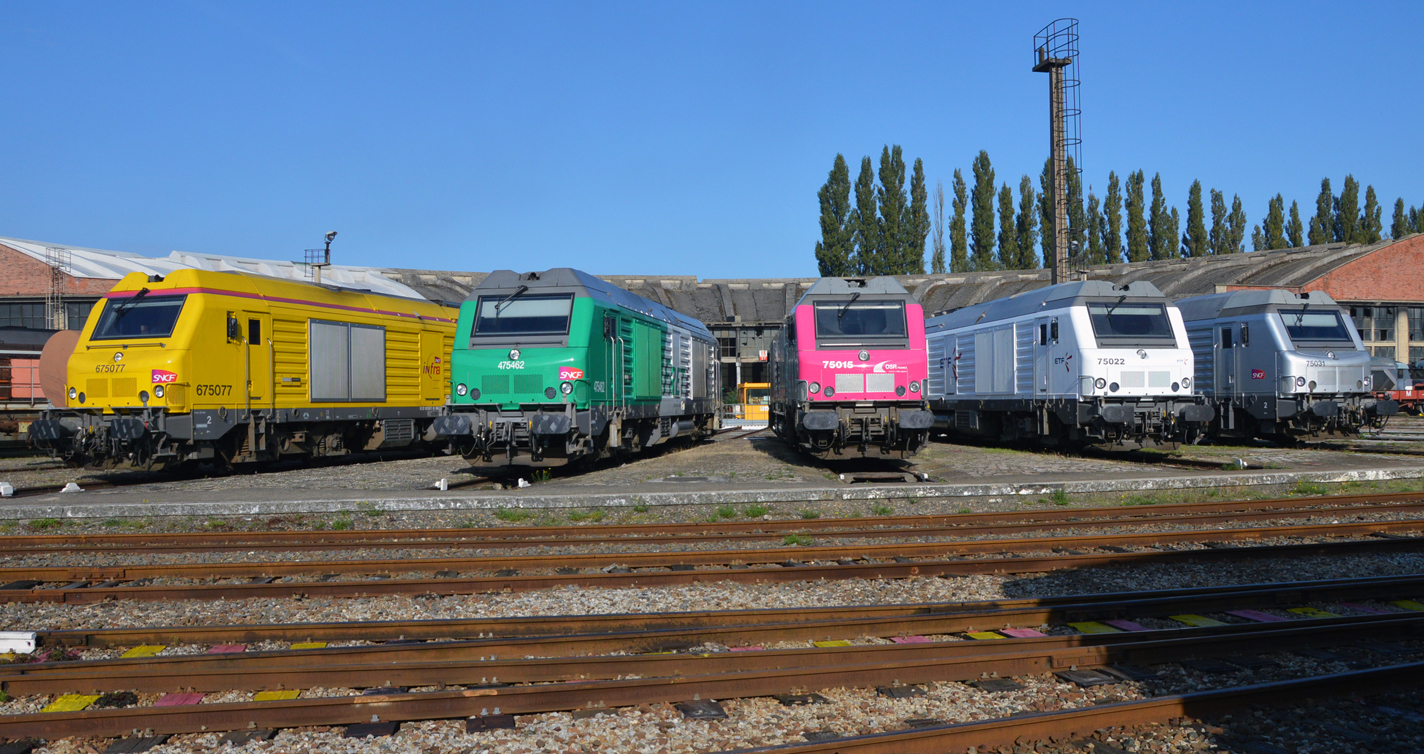
- BB 75077 infra, BB 75462 Fret, BB 75015 OSR, BB 75022 ETF, BB 75031 AKIEM at Longueau depot.
Type and origin
- Power type: diesel
- Designer: Alstom / Siemens
- Builder: Alstom in Belfort
- Serial number: SNCF BB 475000
- Build date: 2006 -
- Total produced: 200 (out of 400 planned and further 100 optional)
Specifications
- Configuration
  - UIC: Bo′Bo′
- Gauge: 1,435 mm (4 ft 8 1/2 in), clearance UIC 505-1
- Length: 20.280 m (66.54 ft)
- Loco weight: 84 tonnes (83 long tons; 93 short tons) (empty)
- Fuel type: Diesel
- Prime mover: MTU
- Engine type: 1 V16 Diesel
- Transmission: Electric
- Safety systems: KVB, RPS, DAAT, GSMR radio PZB (Germany)
Performance figures
- Maximum speed: 120 km/h (75 mph)
- Power output: 2,000 kW (2,700 hp) (engine); 1,600 kW (2,100 hp) (at rail)
- Tractive effort: (starting) 250 kN (56,000 lb_{f}) / 300 kN (67,000 lb_{f}); 223 kN (50,000 lb_{f}) @ 25 km/h (16 mph)
Career
- Operators: SNCF
- Locale: 75000 series: France; 75100 series: Germany

The SNCF BB 75000 (also known as the SNCF BB 475000) are 4 axle, Bo′Bo′, diesel electric locomotives ordered in 2000 by SNCF for freight operations to renew its aging fleet. (Note: The average age of its locomotive in 2000 was 31 years.)

The locomotives are also classified as Prima DE30BAC

They are similar in appearance to the SNCF Class BB 27000, but are in fact the result of a collaboration between Alstom and Siemens. The internal electrical components are similar to those found in the Siemens EuroRunner made for ÖBB; the Rh 2016, and the bodyshell, bogies and other equipment being of the Prima type made by Alstom.

The initial order was for 400 machines to be delivered from 2007 onwards with an option for a further 100 additional machines. The order is valued at 1 billion euros.

== Development ==
=== Background ===
The order for the BB 75000 resulted from a long and arduous project of renewal of diesel freight locomotives, which began in 2000, and spans a period of seven years from the announcement of the tender to the delivery of the new BB 75000s.

SNCF had a requirement for new diesel locomotives for two reasons:

- The current diesel fleet is very old (Note: In fact the last diesel locomotive delivered was a BB 67400 (No. 67632) in October 1975) and expensive in terms of operation and maintenance.
- The changes in European pollution and emission regulations as well as noise regulations make it necessary for the organisation to renew its fleet.

=== Tenders ===
The first document released by SNCF relating to this order was published in November 2000. It refers to delivery of 124 diesel powered freight locomotives and invites manufacturers to submit tenders. With a delivery date between 2003 and 2006 it set out a requirement for two types of locomotives:

- 55 Single cab locomotives with an average power of 1200 to 1800 kW (with performances comparable to those of BB 66000 and BB 67000) suitable for medium distance routes.
- 69 High-power devices with two cabs for long-distance trains. These locomotives would be expected to replace CC 72000 and would need between 2250 and 3200 kW of power.

However the project did not receive sufficient funding for the cost of the expensive high powered Co'Co' locomotives that would fulfil the second role and as a result the project was cancelled.

A few months after the cancellation of the first tender, a second was launched. It is based on the idea of a single multipurpose engine of medium power (1800 kW) similar to designs already available. These units would be used in multiple when necessary to provide a lower cost alternative to the expense of designing a high powered 6 axle from scratch. New tenders were to be delivered by November 2001 and technical meetings with potential manufacturers held during the spring of 2002.

In November 2002, Alstom and Siemens formed a winning consortium (with Alstom taking the lead role) and the project was finalized with SNCF in 2003. The contract was signed on 27 February 2004, and was substantially different from the original specifications published in 2000— not 124 but 400 new machines (all of medium power), which will reduce the average age of the locomotive freight fleet to 15 – 20 years.

The design used already proven components; traction components similar to those in the Siemens built OBB Rh 2016 and the structural design from the Alstom Prima 427000 series of locomotives.

The purchase contract was signed on 25 March 2004 inside the Station of Villeneuve-Saint-Georges, in the presence of the Presidents of the SNCF, Alstom, and Siemens for the purchase of 400 locomotives with a possible further 100.

For the occasion, BB 437,002 was disguised to resemble an as yet unbuilt BB 475,001.

=== Testing and approval ===
The first locomotives came off the assembly line at Alstom in Belfort in spring 2006. The BB 75001 and 75002 were sent to Test- and Validationcenter Wegberg-Wildenrath in Germany in March 2006 for testing by the manufacturer until May 2007. They then returned to Belfort in early June for a final tests before being delivered to the railway in September or October 2007.

BB 75003 and 75004 carried out tests on the national network in June 2006 for the BB 75003. Torque and mechanical tests in took place in Vitry-sur-Seine, then journeying to the French Riviera in July 2006 to test dynamic behavior, noise and vibration.

In late October 2006 the exact configurations for the main build of locomotives was issued.

BB 75004 went to Châlons-en-Champagne for tests on the brakes, and haulage tests, before travelling to Nevers for tests on the brakes. The process concluded on 21 November 2006 with BB 75006 undertaking shunting tests at Plouaret. In February 2007 the order allowing entry into commercial operation was given by the Établissement public de sécurité ferroviaire (EPSF) and issued to Fret SNCF on 27 March.

== Service ==
Following the test and approval process the production of the locomotives could begin; by the end of June 2007 thirty locomotives had been built.

All new BB 75000 are received at the Gare de Longueau on the TER Picardie line in Amiens - where they will help replace the SNCF Class BB 67400 working between northern France and Belgium; from there they will be divided between two depots:

- Longueau: 150 - 200 machines (including those with equipment for cross border operations) (Note: Those machines suitable for cross border are numbered from 100 onwards ie BB 475100 and upwards.)
- Avignon.

They are primarily used on journeys of less than 400 km with train weight up to 1800 tonnes, above this mass multiple traction is employed.

Their first placements are in the north of France plus the Île-de-France from June 11 (Massy, Le Bourget, Vaires-sur-Marne and Troyes). Workings in the East and South-East of France will be served by the later production models, while the West will be supported by the new type of BB 60000 and the BB 69000 (which are remotorised BB 66000s).

On 28 March 2007, the first commercial multiple working took place consisting of BB 75009 and 75006.

== Conclusion ==
The introduction of this new locomotive should mean the elimination of BB 67300, CC 72000, and through multiple unit workings of non-updated BB 66000.

It is not impossible that a variant be built or modified for passenger traffic (like the BB 27300 Transilien, derived from the SNCF Class BB 27000) because they have the necessary equipment (Note: SNCF wishes to continue its supply of military transport trains, which are frequently of the Mixed train type with passenger cars attached.)

== Updates ==
European standards will become increasingly demanding in terms of the requirements for particulate emissions and also the amount of CO_{2} emitted. These new guidelines will be implemented in two stages, taking place in January 2009 and in January 2012.

To comply with the first set of standards (January 2009) all new locomotives of this type will be built with a new diesel engine: the MTU 4000 R43. As well as engine modifications, the locomotive's exhaust will be changed (many locomotive manufacturers are implementing new exhaust systems to reduce emitted particulates). This will change the external appearance of these locomotives. All new locomotives built thus will be numbered from 200 onwards, i.e., BB 475200 and upwards in number.

== Versions ==
Versions of the BB 75000
N°	Description
75001 à 75099	Machines with engine MTU 16V 4000 R41
75100	Does not exist
75101 à 75133	Machines with engine MTU 16V 4000 R41 interoperable with the Germany and Benelux
75300 (75000 amended)	Machines with engine MTU 16V 4000 R41 + intercom
75401 à 75468	Machines equipped with the MTU 4000 R 43 L 2400 kW engine

- 75001 - 75006 Locomotives used for testing

== See also ==
- Alstom Prima locomotives
- Siemens Eurorunner A class of similar locomotives that also has the electric power system supplied by Siemens
- SNCF Class BB 27000 and SNCF Class BB 37000 two closely related electric locomotives
- SNCF Class BB 60000 - single cabin locomotives built at the same time as the BB 75000 : also part of the modernisation process
