= Lineas =

Belgian rail freight company

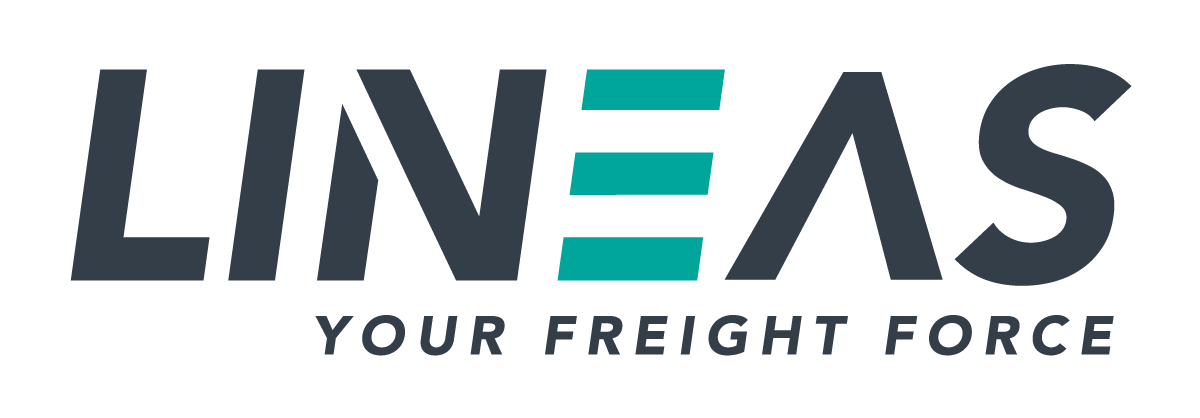

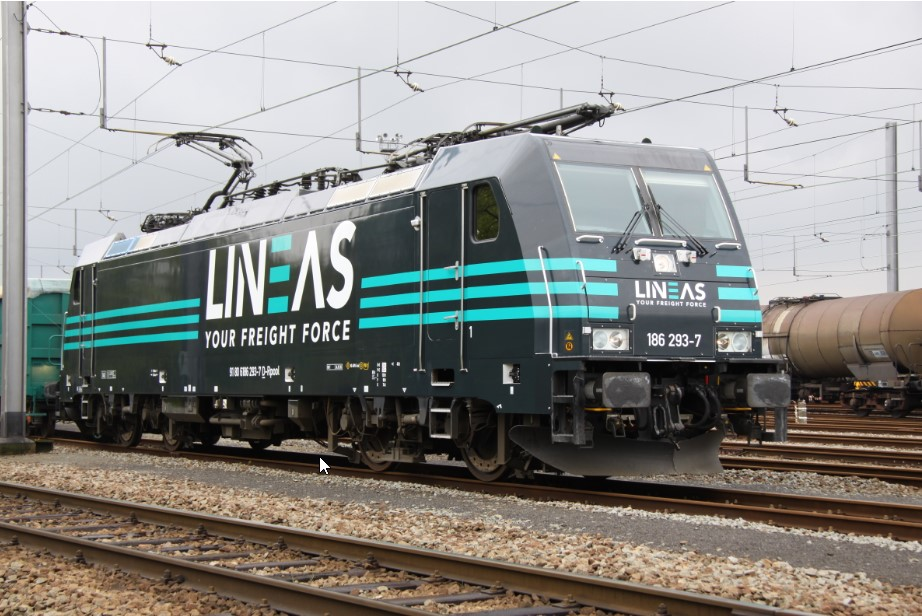
- Bombardier Traxx locomotive in Lineas livery
- Type: Private
- Industry: Rail freight, logistics
- Founded: 2011
- Headquarters: Brussels, Belgium
- Key people: Erik van Ockenburg (CEO)
- Revenue: €479 million (2023)
- Owner: Federal Holding and Investment Company
- Number of employees: 1700
- Website: lineas.net

Lineas is a private rail freight operator, established (as B Logistics) when the freight division of the National Railway Company of Belgium (NMBS / SNCB) was privatised in the context of the liberalisation of the European rail freight market. The company's headquarters are in Belgium, but it has expanded its operations across Europe and also operates from sites in France, Italy, Germany and the Netherlands. In 2020 Lineas was Europe's largest private rail freight operator.

== Operations ==
Lineas operates an extensive rail network across Europe, with key operational hubs in Flanders and Wallonia in Belgium, alongside major logistics centers in Germany, France, and the Netherlands.

The North Sea ports of Antwerp, Ghent and Rotterdam are important sources of traffic for the company. As a cross-border rail transport operator, Lineas provides its own traction in Belgium, Luxembourg, the Netherlands, France and Germany. Moreover, the company has a presence on both the French and German sides of the Rhine.

In an attempt to increase rail's modal share for freight transport Lineas has developed a network of frequent wagonload freight trains with reliable shipping times on fixed routes, called Green Xpress. This network directly links Antwerpen to major hubs such as Cologne, Le Havre, Vienna and Bratislava. Using multi-system locomotives and open-access rights allows the trains to run as far as possible without intermediate shunting, reducing journey times.

Lineas also operates block trains and intermodal freight transport trains and provides last-mile services around the ports of Antwerp, Ghent and Rotterdam.

== Corporate affairs ==
In recent years, Lineas has focused on promoting a level playing field within the rail freight sector and between rail and road transport. To address competition with major State-owned rail operators and reduce potential market distortions, Lineas has emphasized the need for fair competition measures. Additionally, the company advocates for the removal of tax advantages granted to road transport and supports the internalization of external costs, such as road congestion, pollution, and safety-related expenses, across all transport modes.

=== Management ===
Lineas is led by Bernard Gustin, supported by a team of executives.

The Executive Leadership Team is composed of:

- Bernard Gustin, executive chairman and CFO a.i.
- Alban François, Operations
- Jan Luyten, Human Resources
- Anne Grandjean, Public Affairs & Communication
- Mark Geuens, Data & Information
- Luc Pirenne, Sales

Country managers:

- Jeroen Vermaelen, country manager Lineas Belgium
- Matthieu Aernouts, country manager Lineas France
- Katrin Kröger, country manager Lineas Germany and The Netherlands

=== Corporate governance ===
Lineas follows strict standards in corporate governance, ensuring transparency, accountability, and ethical business practices.

=== Corporate social responsibility ===
Rail freight is the most sustainable freight transport mode: 1 train removes 50 trucks from the road. Moreover, rail freight emits one-sixth the CO_{2}, one-eighth the air pollution, and consumes one-sixth the energy. By enabling the modal shift from road to rail, Lineas aims to make a positive impact on society and address issues in multiple areas, such as climate change, congestion, air quality, and health and safety. Lineas also embraces its societal responsibility towards its main stakeholders: employees, customers, partners, and shareholders. ESG objectives and priorities are integral to how the company operates and are taken on board at every stage of managerial decision-making. In line with the Sustainable Development Goals (SDGs) framework and its own strategic vision, Lineas’ ESG efforts revolve around four essential sustainability pillars:

- Responding to climate change: The company is actively working to combat climate change, reducing its environmental footprint to protect the planet. For this purpose, Lineas has set ambitious carbon reduction targets that have been validated by the SBTi Organization.
- Valuing human capital: Lineas considers its people as its greatest asset. The company invest in their well-being, growth, and development, creating a workplace that values and supports every individual by setting clear well-being and DEI goals.
- Building sustainable and resilient supply chains: Lineas is committed to developing supply chains that are not only sustainable but also resilient in the face of challenges, ensuring the continuity of services. Lineas has been recognized for its governance in this area.
- Engage and make efforts visible: Lineas believes in transparency and actively engages with its stakeholders to create positive change. The company wants its efforts to be visible and inspiring to others.

== History ==
=== 2005–2011: Beginnings as B-Cargo ===
During 2005, the European Union introduced the Second Railway Package, liberalising the rail market in Europe. Following this the National Railway Company of Belgium (NMBS/SNCB) was restructured into Infrabel, responsible for infrastructure, and NMBS/SNCB, responsible for operations. Rail freight was were operated by the SNCB Logistics division of NBMS/SNCB.

In 2011, SNCB Logistics was established as an independent entity, though it remained entirely owned by the SNCB/NMBS Group.

=== 2015–2019: Privatisation and rebranding ===
In 2015 SNCB Logistics was partly privatised. The private equity firm Argos Wityu, in collaboration with the company’s management, acquired a 69% stake, while SNCB/NMBS retained 31% ownership. This marked the beginning of a major transformation. Prior to privatisation, the company was not profitable; however, profitability soon increased.

In early 2017, B Logistics changed its name to Lineas. This period also saw a steady reduction in its dependency on SNCB/NMBS and Infrabel, leaving only a few essential links to serve Lineas’ operational interests.

In 2019 Argos Wityu acquired an additional 21% of Lineas from SNCB/NMBS.

=== 2020: Recognition and resilience amid challenges ===
In February 2020, CEO Geert Pauwels received the European Railway Award. This recognition celebrated his leadership the transformation of a loss-making division of the Belgian railways into a profitable and innovative private rail freight operator.

On 9 April 2020, as the COVID-19 pandemic was disrupting industries worldwide, Lineas unveiled a white locomotive, the 'Heroes Loc', in the Port of Antwerp as a tribute to frontline workers in the fight against the coronavirus. At the same time, the locomotive wanted to highlight problems in the railway sector caused by the COVID-19 pandemic.

Shortly thereafter, in response to the low water levels on the Rhine river, the company put on additional trains to ensure critical goods could be transported by rail instead of by barge.

=== 2021: Strategic expansion ===
In 2021, the Belgian Federal Holding and Investment Company (SFPI/FPIM) acquired SNCB/NMBS’ remaining 10% minority share, marking the end of SNCB/NMBS’ involvement. Lineas also expanded its presence in the Dutch market through the acquisition of Independent Rail Partner (IRP).

=== 2022: Transformation and change in leadership ===
On 1 April 2022, Lineas became the first rail company to apply a dynamic energy surcharge to all of its services; a spokesperson stated that this change was made to compensate for soaring energy prices.

== Financial performance ==
As a division of NMBS/SNCB, SNCB Logistics was loss-making, but after becoming a separate entity it made a profit of €11 million in 2013, despite freight volumes decreasing each year between 2012 and 2014. Following privatisation the volume of freight transported by the company increased to 31.5 million tonnes in 2016 and financial results improved to a €27 million profit in the same year. More recently the company's financial results have deteriorated and in the fiscal year 2023, Lineas reported a revenue of €470 million with losses of €39.5 million, an improvement from a €100 million loss in 2022 In 2025 a decline in steel, chemicals and automotive traffic led to Lineas receiving a €61 million loan from the Belgian government.

== Fleet ==
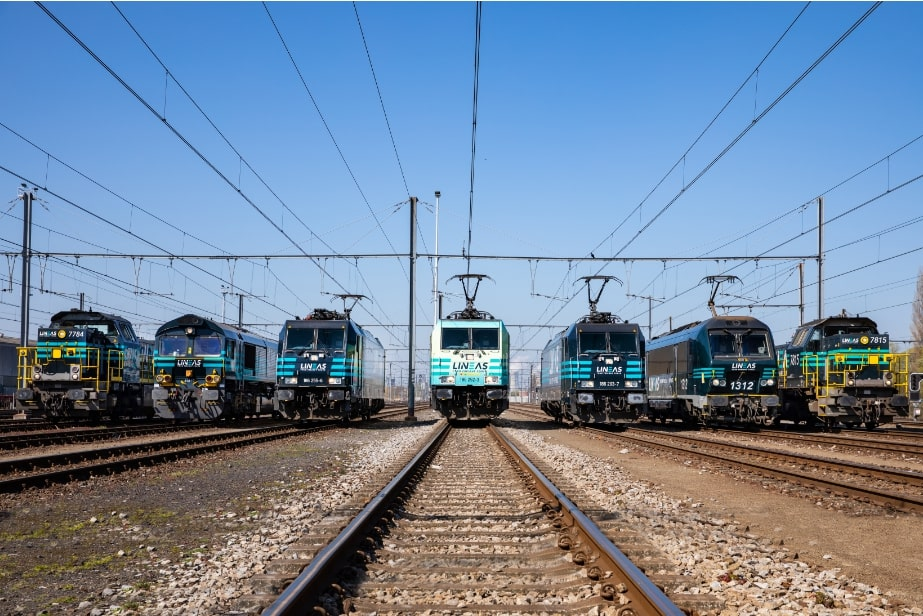
Lineas locomotives

At the time of its privatisation B Logistics acquired 41 Class 13 electric locomotives, 110 Class 77 diesel locomotives and 7000 wagons from NMBS/SNCB. Since then it has also leased 39 Bombardier Traxx electric locomotives and two EMD Class 66 diesel locomotives. In 2017 Lineas had more than 200 locomotives and 7000 wagons.

Throughout the 2020s, 110 of Lineas' locomotives were being retrofitted with ETCS. Since 2021, Lineas, Ermewa and Beacon Rail have had a long-term partnership based on the sale-and-leaseback of both diesel locomotives and wagons.

In 2020, a partnership between Lineas, the Dutch rail infrastructure owner ProRail, and the French rolling stock manufacturer Alstom demonstrated an autonomous shunting locomotive.

For its French operations Lineas leases a fleet of 39 Alstom Prima locomotives, including BB 27000 and BB 37000 electric locomotives and SNCF Class BB 75000 diesels, from Akiem.

=== Wagons ===
==== Steel wagons ====
- Shimm(n)s for cold coils
- Shimm(n)s for hot coils
- Remms for slabs

==== Bulk wagons ====
- Tads for limestone
- Fal(n)s for coal
- Eaos and Fas for scrap

==== Intermodal / container wagons ====
- Lgnss 40’
- Sgnss 60’
- Sggnss 72’
- Sggrss 80’

=== Locomotives ===
- Alstom Electric Class 13 (BFLU)
- Bombardier Traxx (DABNL)
- Bombardier Traxx (DBF)
- EMD Class 66 (DBNL)
- Siemens-Vossloh Diesel Class 77 (DBNL)
- SNCF Class BB 75000 (F)
- SNCF Class BB 27000 (F)
- MaK / Vossloh G1206

== Organisation and locations ==
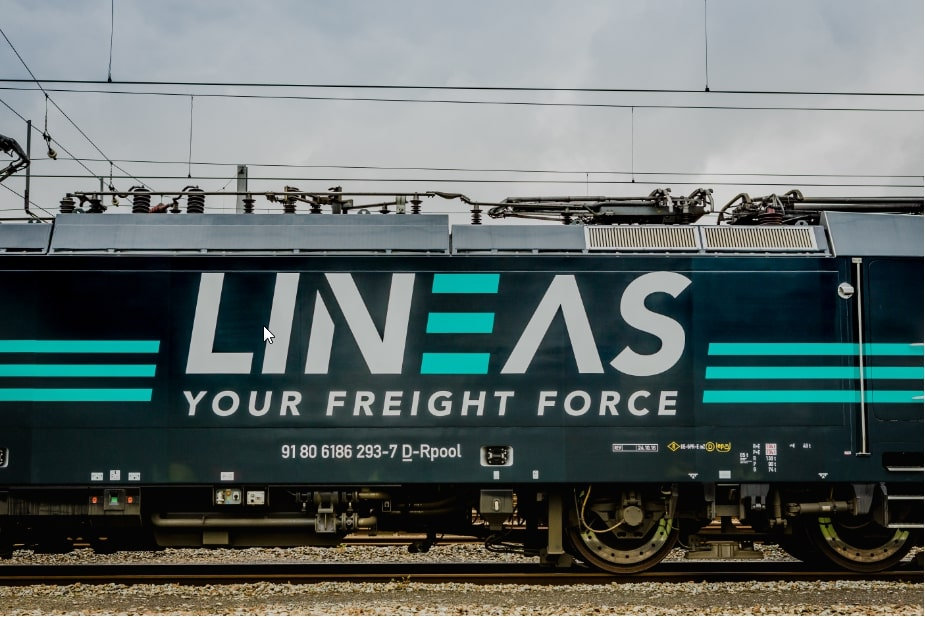
Lineas locomotive

Lineas employs about 1700 people.

Lineas is a member of Rail Freight Forward, a group of European rail freight companies which aims to reduce the negative impact of freight transport on mobility, climate and the environment by shifting freight from road to rail. Lineas is also a member of the Belgian Rail Freight Forum. In France, the company is part of the 4F, the Fret Ferroviaire Français du Futur, and in Germany, it is a member of the NEE, the Netzwerk Europäischer Eisenbahnen.

In February 2020, Lineas became a member of the European Rail Freight Association (ERFA). The coalition aims to play a role in creating a common, fully liberalised and competitive European rail freight market.

In June 2020, Lineas won the VOKA Sustainable Business Charter (VCDO). As a result of the charter, the company was the first Belgian transport company to receive the United Nations Institute for Training and Research (UNITAR) Certificate for Sustainable Business in October 2020.

During June 2023, Linease announced that it was combining its various Dutch businesses into a single entity. Around the same time, the company’s two shareholders, the French investment fund Argos Wityu (90%) and the Belgian federal government (10%), are working on a first tranche of capital injection with the reported target of 20 million euros.
