= SNCF Class BB 47000 =

SNCF BB47000/Alstom Prima 6000
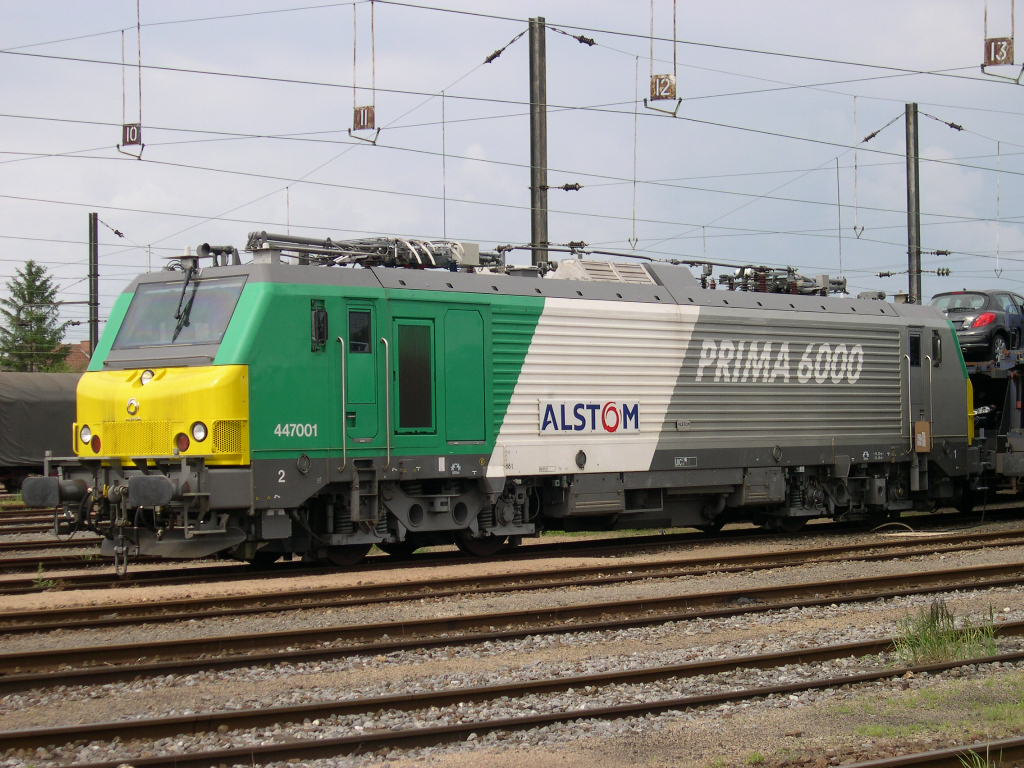
Type and origin
- Power type: Electric
- Builder: Alstom
- Build date: 2003
Specifications
- Configuration
  - UIC: Bo′Bo′
- Gauge: 1,435 mm (4 ft 8 1/2 in) standard gauge
- Length: 19.72 m (64 ft 8 in)
- Loco weight: 90 short tons (82 t; 80 long tons)
- Electric system/s: Catenary; 1500 V DC; 3000 V DC; 15 kV 16.7 Hz AC; 25 kV 50 Hz AC
- Current pickup: Pantograph
- Traction motors: 4×Alstom FRA 4567 with IGBT powerpacks
- Safety systems: Crocodile, KVB, TBL, ETCS
Performance figures
- Maximum speed: 140 km/h (87 mph)
- Power output: 6,000 kW (8,000 hp)
Career
- Operators: Alstom
- Number in class: 1
- Nicknames: Prima 6000
- First run: 2003
- Withdrawn: 2009
- Disposition: out of service

The SNCF Class BB 47000 "Prima" electric locomotive is a 6,000 kW (8,000 hp) locomotive, built by Alstom. This locomotive is the quadruple-voltage version of the Class BB 27000. So far, only one locomotive, numbered 47001, has been built and was tested by Fret SNCF with a view for further orders. In 2006 it became clear that SNCF wouldn't order this version anymore and the locomotive had passed on to Alstom as a permanent test bed locomotive for testing different Alstom technologies. In 2009, the locomotive was devoid of all technical components. Its bogies were re-used by the Prima II-prototype. The locomotive is now stored outside Alstom's Belfort plant.
