= SNCF Class BB 66400 =

Class of centre cab diesel locomotives developed from the earlier Class BB 66000

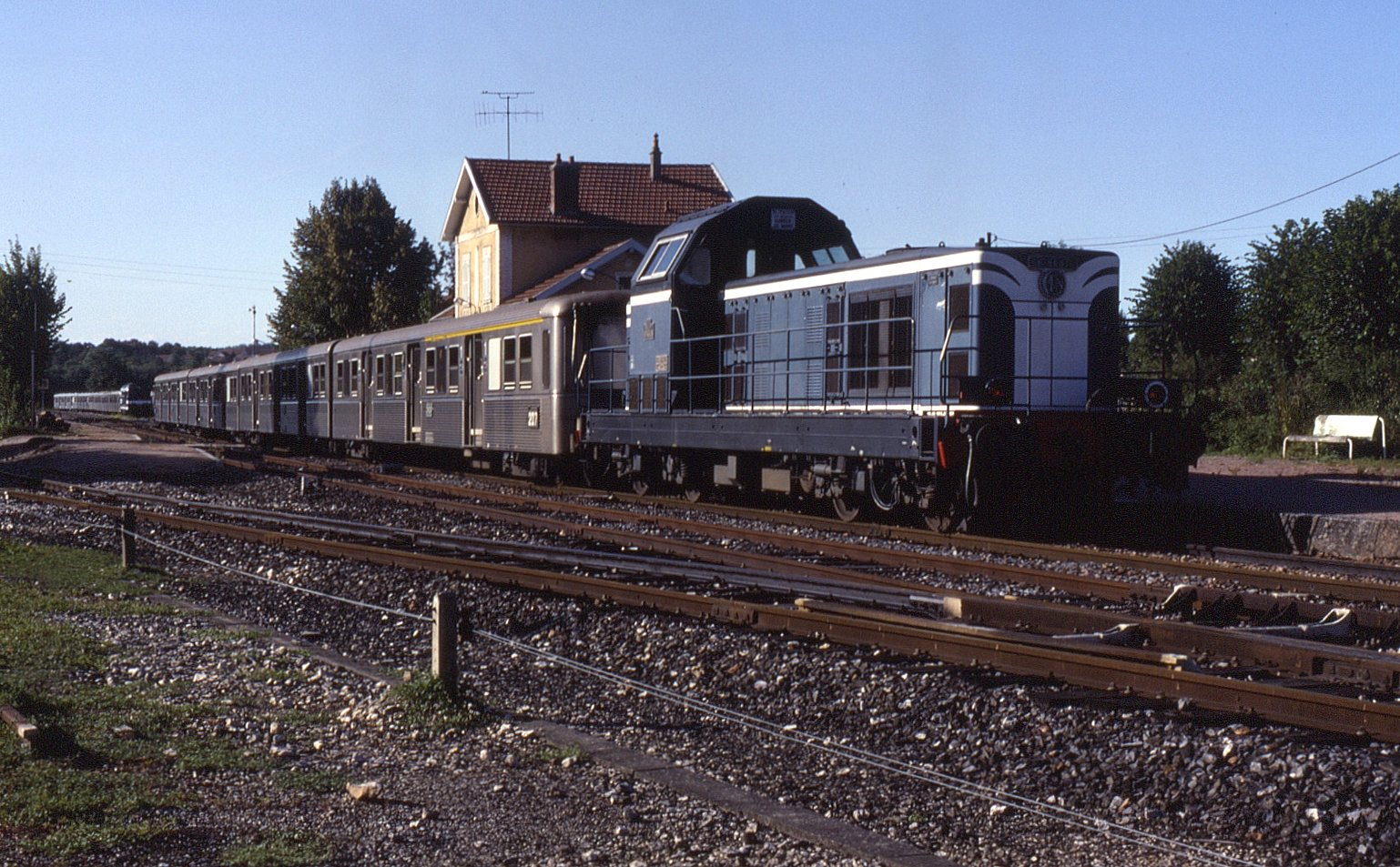
- BB66438 is seen at La Ferté-Gaucher heading a Paris Est train
Type and origin
- Power type: Diesel-electric
- Builder: CAFL/CEM/Alsthom/Fives-Lille/SACM
- Build date: 1968–1971
- Total produced: 106
Specifications
- Configuration
  - Commonwealth: Bo-Bo
- Gauge: 1,435 mm (4 ft 8 1/2 in)
- Wheel diameter: 1,100 mm (43 in)
- Length: 14.972 m (49.12 ft)
- Loco weight: 64 t (63 long tons; 71 short tons)
- Prime mover: MGO V16BSHR
- Transmission: 3 phase electric
- MU working: Yes
- Train heating: ETH
Performance figures
- Maximum speed: 120 km/h (75 mph)
- Power output: 1,030 kW (1,380 hp)
- Tractive effort: 167 kN (38,000 lb_{f})
Career
- Operators: SNCF
- Number in class: 106
- Numbers: BB 66401–BB 66506

The SNCF Class BB 66400 is a class of centre cab mixed traffic diesel locomotives. The class is a development of the BB 66000 with 3 phase electric transmission. The 106 locomotives were built for SNCF by a consortium of CAFL, CEM, Alsthom, Fives-Lille and SACM between 1968 and 1971. They are 14.972 m (49.12 ft) long and weigh 64 t (63 long tons; 71 short tons). The prime mover is a MGO V16BSHR diesel engine developing 1,030 kW (1,380 hp). The maximum speed is 120 km/h (75 mph).

As built they had no train heating but were later fitted with electric train heating and equipped for push–pull working for operating local passenger trains.

From 2004 some 75 members of the class were rebuilt with new MTU 12V 4000 R41 engines and reclassified as BB 69400.
