= SNCF Class BB 67200 =

Class of 80 French diesel locomotives rebuilt from SNCF BB 67000

Class BB 67200
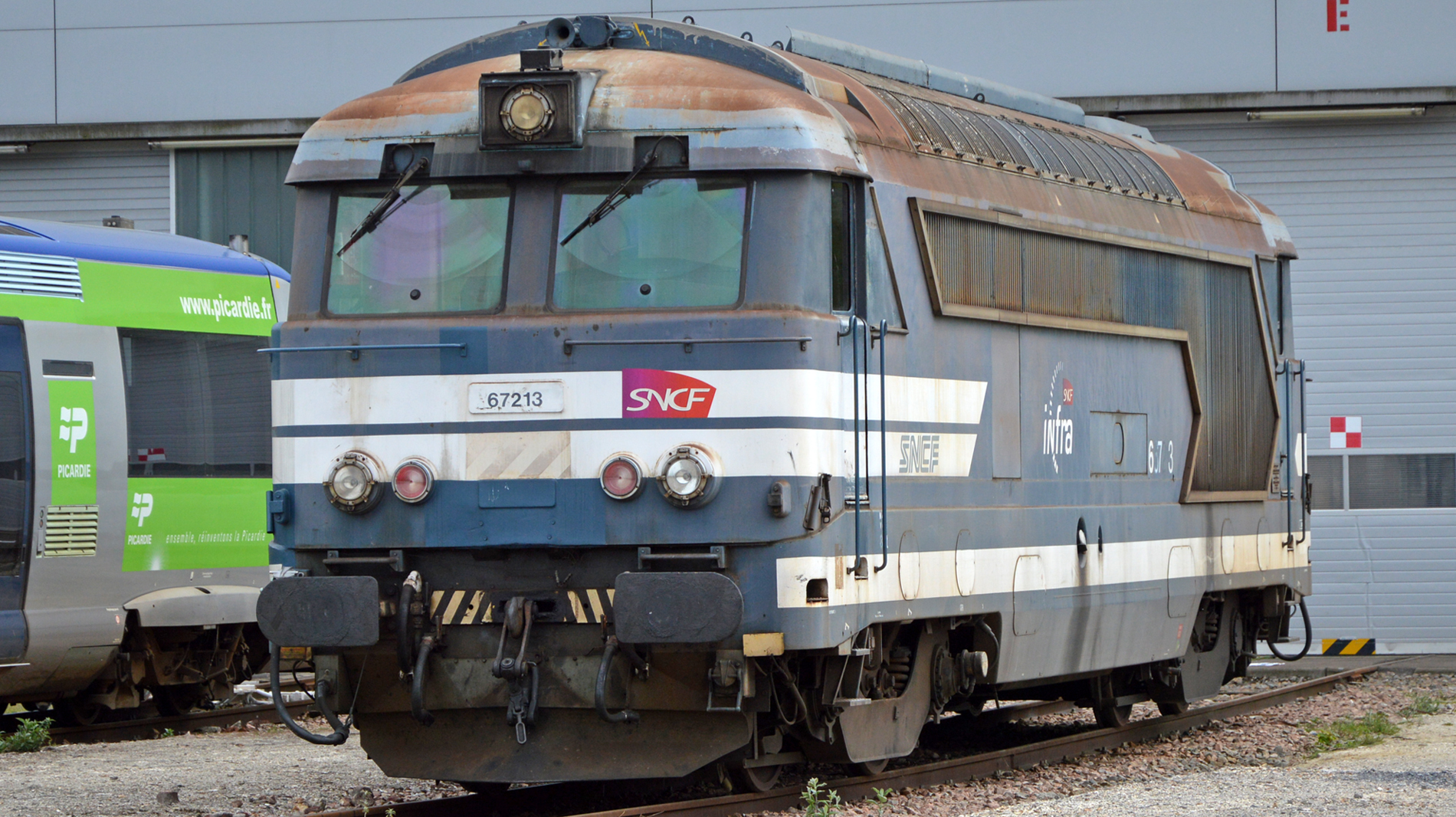
- BB 67213 at Longueau
Type and origin
- Power type: Diesel-electric
- Designer: Paul Arzens
- Builder: Brissonneau and Lotz
- Build date: 1980–1984
- Total produced: 80
Specifications
- Configuration
  - UIC: Bo′Bo′
  - Commonwealth: Bo-Bo
- Gauge: 1,435 mm (4 ft 8 1/2 in)
- Wheel diameter: 1,150 mm (45 in)
- Length: 17,090 mm (673 in)
- Loco weight: 80 t (79 long tons; 88 short tons)
- Prime mover: SEMT 16PA4
- Engine type: V16 Diesel
- Cylinders: 16
- Transmission: Electrical
- Train heating: None
Performance figures
- Maximum speed: 90 km/h (56 mph)
- Power output: 303 kN (68,000 lb_{f})
Career
- Operators: SNCF
- Class: BB 67200
- Numbers: 67201–67280

The Class BB 67200 diesel locomotives of SNCF were adapted from BB 67000 locomotives.

== History ==
With the opening of the LGV Sud-Est, thirty BB 67000 class locomotives were fitted with cab signalling and radio to operate ballast trains and for use in an emergency on the high speed lines. For the latter purpose they were fitted with a Scharfenberg coupler at one end to enable them to be attached to a TGV rake. Initially the class was based at Nevers. A further 50 locomotives were subsequently converted.
