= SNCF Class BB 66600 =

Class of centre cab diesel locomotives rebuilt from the earlier Class BB 66000

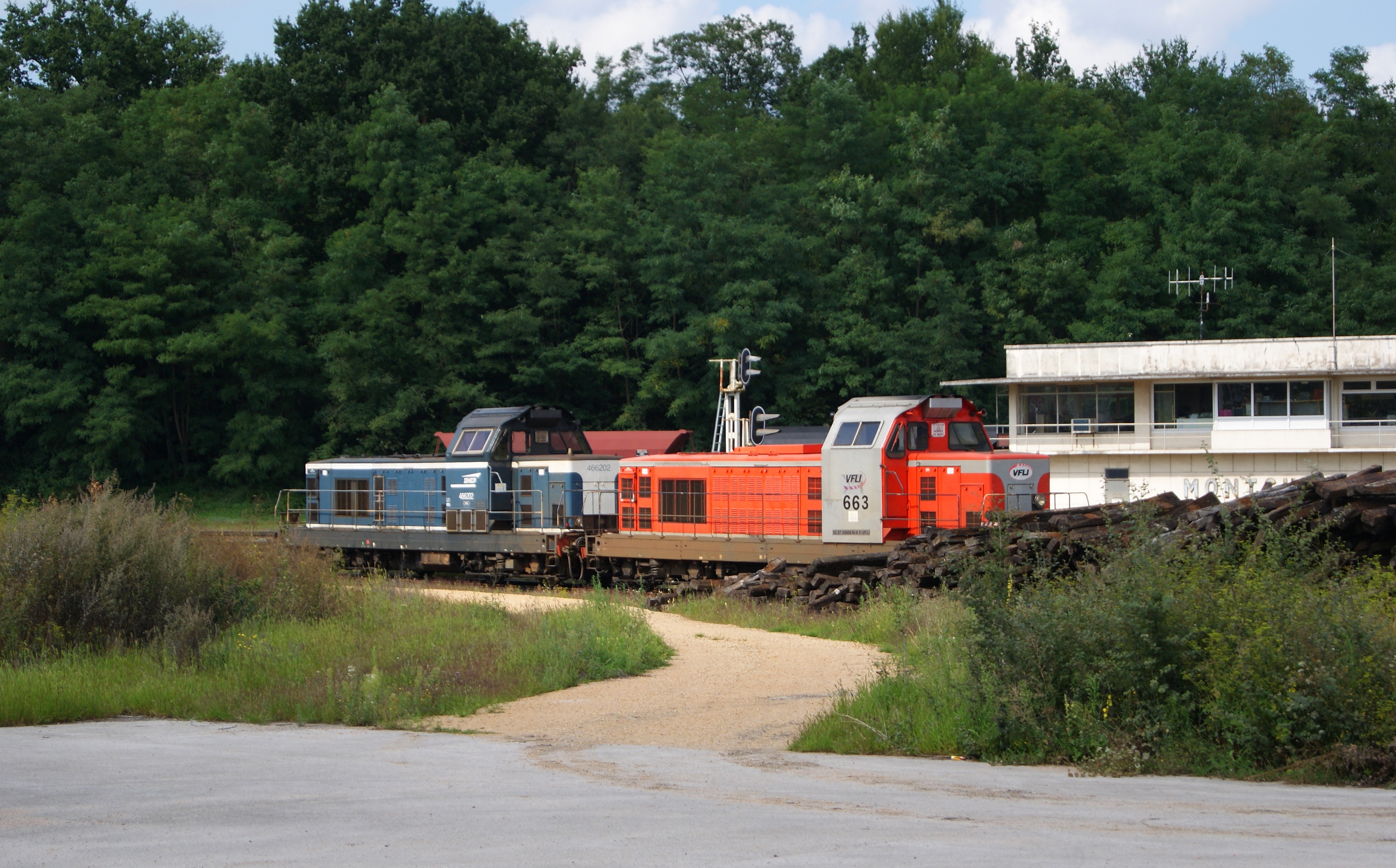
Type and origin
- Power type: Diesel-electric
- Builder: CAFL/CEM/Alsthom/Fives-Lille
- Build date: 1960–1962
- Total produced: 11
- Rebuild date: 1965
Specifications
- Configuration
  - UIC: Bo-Bo
  - Commonwealth: Bo-Bo
- Gauge: 1,435 mm (4 ft 8 1/2 in)
- Wheel diameter: 1,100 mm (43 in)
- Length: 14.898 m (48.88 ft)
- Loco weight: 71 t (70 long tons; 78 short tons)
- Fuel type: Diesel
- Prime mover: SEMT 12PA4
- Train heating: ETH
Performance figures
- Maximum speed: 120 km/h (75 mph)
- Power output: 1,100 kW (1,500 hp)
- Tractive effort: 167 kN (38,000 lb_{f})
Career
- Operators: SNCF
- Class: BB 66600
- Number in class: 11

The SNCF Class BB 66600 is a small class of centre cab diesel locomotives rebuilt from the earlier Class BB 66000 by fitting a slightly more powerful engine. The locomotives were 14.898 m (48.88 ft) long and weighed 71 t (70 long tons; 78 short tons). Powered by an SEMT 12PA4 diesel engine developing 1,100 kW (1,500 hp), they had a maximum speed of 120 km/h (75 mph). All members of the class were fitted for multiple working and all but two had electric train heating.

Initially all 11 were allocated to Nîmes to work services to Clermont-Ferrand.

== Fleet List ==
Number	Rebuilt from	Notes
BB 66604	BB 66304	
BB 66605	BB 66305	
BB 66606	BB 66306	
BB 66607	BB 66307	
BB 66608	BB 66308	
BB 66610	BB 66310	
BB 66611	BB 66311	
BB 66612	BB 66312	
BB 66614	BB 66098	Not fitted with ETH
BB 66615	BB 66102	Not fitted with ETH
BB 66616	BB 66106	
