= SNCF Class BB 27300 =

Class of 67 French electric locomotives

Class BB 27300
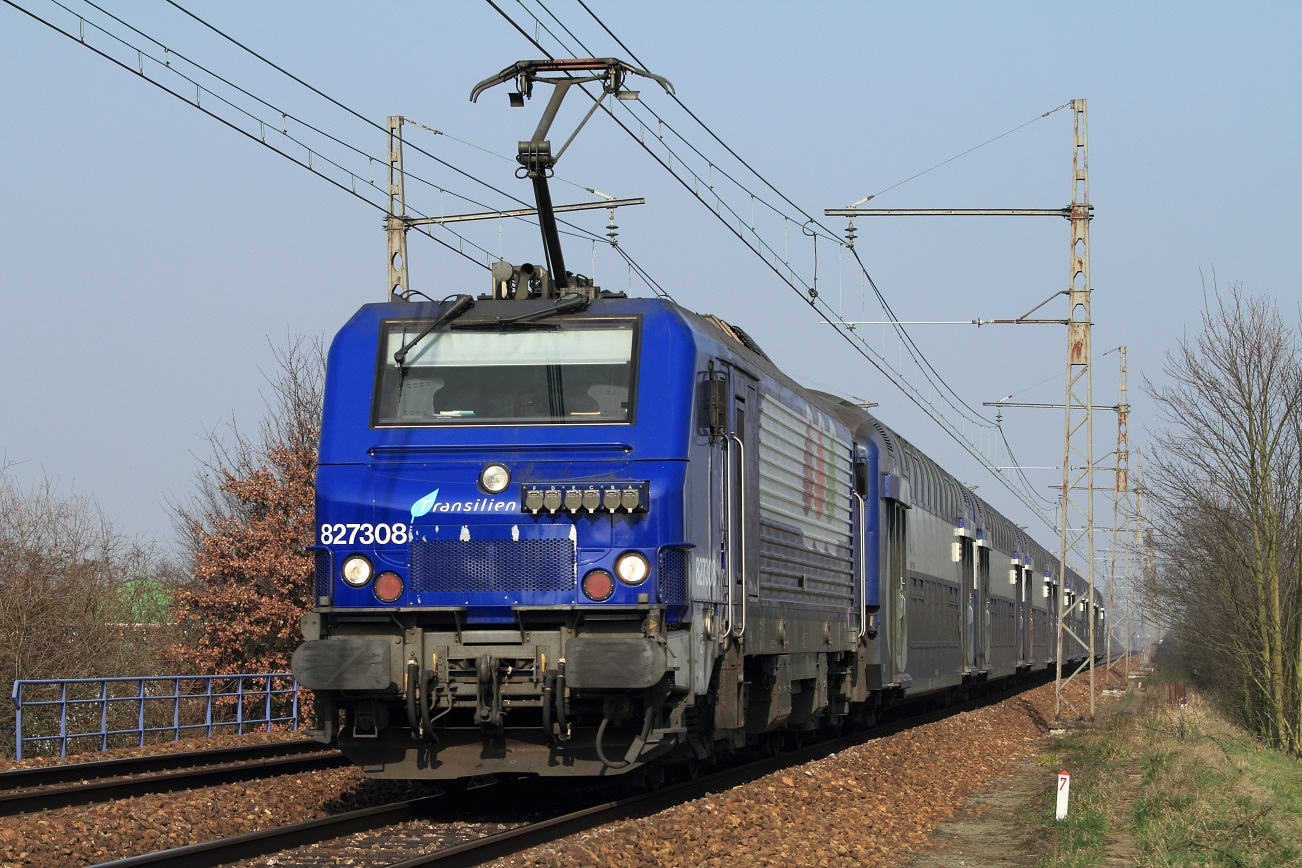
- SNCF locomotive BB 27308 arriving at Rambouillet
Type and origin
- Power type: Electric
- Builder: Alstom
- Model: Prima EL2P
- Build date: 2004–2009
- Total produced: 67
Specifications
- Configuration
  - UIC: Bo′Bo′
- Gauge: 1,435 mm (4 ft 8 1/2 in) standard gauge
- Wheelbase: 10.60 m (34 ft 9 in)
- Length: 19.52 m (64 ft 1 in)
- Loco weight: 89 tonnes (196,000 lb)
- Electric system/s: Overhead line: 25 kV 50 Hz AC; 1,500 V DC
- Current pickup: Pantograph
- Traction motors: 4 motors, 6 asynchronous FRA 4567 with forced ventilation
Performance figures
- Maximum speed: 140 km/h (87 mph)
- Power output: 4,200 kW (5,600 hp)
Career
- Operators: SNCF Transilien
- Class: BB 27300
- Number in class: 67
- Numbers: 27301–27367
- Locale: Paris Montparnasse, Paris Saint-Lazare

The SNCF Class BB 27300 is an electric locomotive. There are 67 BB 27300 locomotives, built as part of the Prima range by Alstom. The first BB 27300 were delivered starting in 2006. Painted in the blue and white livery of Transilien, the brand name for the SNCF network around Paris, these locomotives are the passenger equivalent of the freight-only SNCF Class BB 27000 and are equipped for push-pull operation on suburban passenger services in the Île-de-France region around Paris, working with refurbished VB2N double-deck carriages.

== Technical information ==
The power of the locomotive is 4,200 kW (5,600 hp).

The locomotive is equipped with a train protection system derived from the contrôle de vitesse par balises system : the KVBP.

It is also equipped with two pantographs, one dedicated to the 1500 V direct current, the other to the 25000 V alternating current.

== History ==
The BB 27300 were authorized on the national network of France in 2006 by the Établissement public de sécurité ferroviaire.

== Orders ==
The first batch of 60 locomotives was ordered in 2004, and following testing of the first two units in 2005, delivered progressively into 2008. Follow-up orders for five and two locomotives respectively were placed. The locomotives are numbered in series from 27301-27367, although the number carried on the locomotive is prefixed with the number 8, to denote the unit as belonging to the Île-de-France division of SNCF.

== Usage ==
The first locomotives entered service in 2006 on suburban trains from Paris Montparnasse railway station. Current deployment sees a total of 25 locomotives operating services from Paris-Montparnasse on trains to Dreux, Mantes-la-Jolie and Rambouillet. At Montparnasse they have displaced older SNCF Class BB 8500 and BB 25500 locomotives. A further 42 locomotives operate from Paris Saint-Lazare railway station on trains to Poissy, Mantes-la-Jolie, Pontoise, Gisors, and Ermont Eaubonne. At Saint-Lazare BB 8500 and BB 17000 locomotives have been displaced.

== Future ==
The usage of BB 27300 locomotives on suburban passenger services is a temporary measure. It is expected that sometime after 2015 they will begin to be replaced by new Electric Multiple Units. When this happens, the locomotives are likely to find further use with SNCF's freight subsidiary, SNCF Fret, where they will join the technically similar BB 27000 locomotives.

== Gallery ==
A BB 27300 coupling VB 2N, leaving the station Épône - Mézières
