= SNCF Class BB 67400 =

Class of French diesel-electric locomotives

Class BB 67400
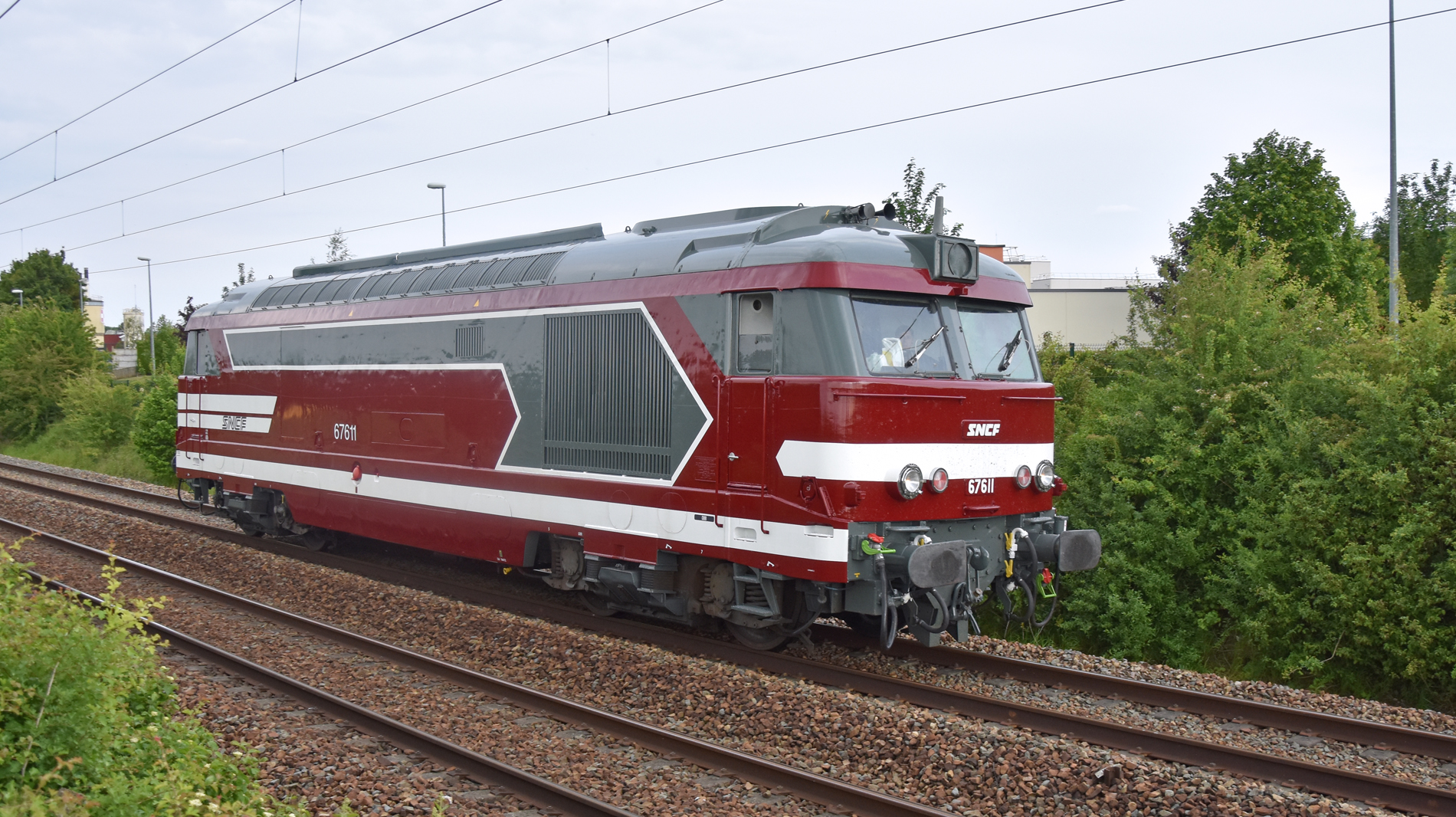
- BB 67611 in the Capitole livery at Daours, 23 May 2019
Type and origin
- Power type: Diesel
- Builder: (France) Brissonneau and Lotz
- Build date: 1969-1975
- Total produced: 232
Specifications
- Configuration
  - UIC: B′B′
- Gauge: 1,435 mm (4 ft 8 1/2 in) standard gauge
- Length: 17.090 m (56 ft 7/8 in)
- Adhesive weight: 10.375 t (10.211 long tons; 11.436 short tons)
- Loco weight: 83 t (82 long tons; 91 short tons)
- Fuel type: Diesel
- Prime mover: SEMT Pielstick 16 PA 4
- Engine type: V16 diesel
- Cylinders: 16
Performance figures
- Maximum speed: 140 km/h (87 mph)
- Power output: 1,765 kW (2,367 hp)
Career
- Operators: SNCF
- Class: BB 67400
- Number in class: 228 (at 2005)
- Numbers: 67401-67632

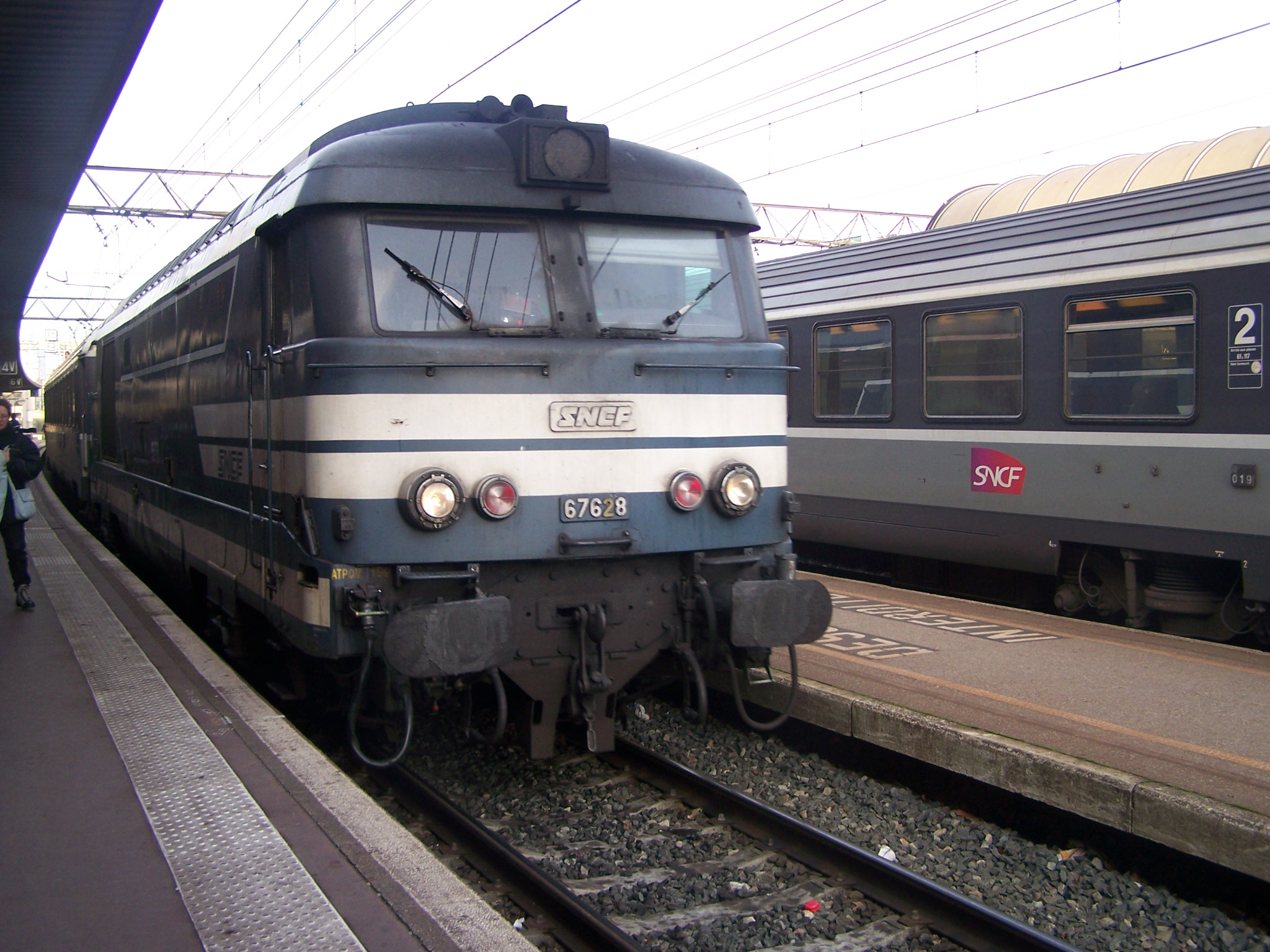
Locomotive BB 467628 and its train arriving at Lyon-Part-Dieu station

The SNCF Class BB 67400 diesel locomotives were built by Brissonneau and Lotz between 1969–1975. The final development of the BB 67000 class, they can be found working all over France on both freight and passenger trains.

== Names ==
5 members of the class received names, chiefly of French communes, towns and cities.

Number	Name	Number	Name
BB 67428	Dreuse	BB 67581	Nevers
BB 67530	Romilly-sur-Seine	BB 67620	Abbeville
BB 67580	Montpellier		
