= Alstom KZ8A =

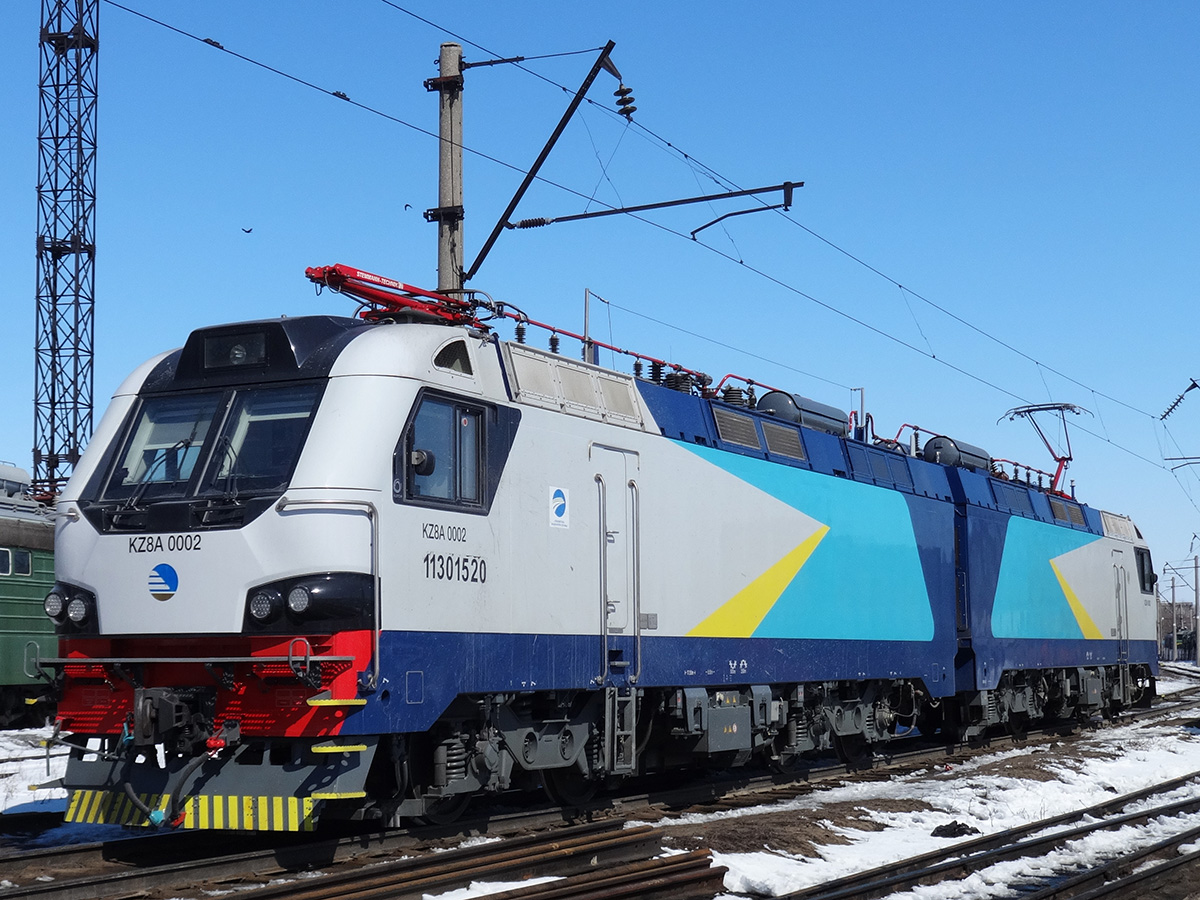
Type and origin
- Power type: Electric
- Builder: Alstom
- Build date: 2012–present
- Total produced: 105
Specifications
- Configuration
  - UIC: Bo′Bo′+Bo′Bo′
- Gauge: 1,520 mm (4 ft 11 27/32 in)
- Length: 35 m (114 ft 10 in)
- Loco weight: 200 t (200 long tons; 220 short tons)
- Electric system/s: 25 kV 50 Hz AC
Performance figures
- Maximum speed: 120 km/h (75 mph)
- Power output: 8,800 kilowatts (11,800 hp)
Career
- Operators: Qazaqstan Temir Zholy
- Disposition: In production, In service

The KZ8A is a broad gauge electric freight locomotive developed by Alstom for Kazakhstan Temir Zholy – national railway company of Kazakhstan. In October 2010, KTZ placed an order for 200 locomotives.

The first were built in Belfort, France; production later shifting to a new factory in Astana. The first KZ8A off the production line was unveiled in October 2012.

== Specification ==
The locomotives will be among the most powerful in the world, capable of hauling 9000 tonne freight trains; they have also been designed to cope with extremes of temperature.

The locomotives will weigh 200 tonnes, with 8.8MW power output and a maximum speed of 120 km/h.

== KZ4AT ==
Alstom KZ4AT
Type and origin
- Power type: Electric
- Builder: Alstom
- Build date: 2019–present
- Total produced: ?
Specifications
- Configuration
  - UIC: Bo-Bo
- Gauge: 1,520 mm (4 ft 11 27/32 in)
- Electric system/s: 25 kV 50 Hz AC
Performance figures
- Maximum speed: 200 km/h (120 mph)
Career
- Operators: Qazaqstan Temir Zholy
- Disposition: In production, In service

Alstom started the production of passenger electric locomotives Prima M4 KZ4AT in the EKZ joint venture in Astana, Kazakhstan in June 2019. These locomotives are part of the contract signed with KTZ (Kazakhstan Railways) for delivery and maintenance of 302 Prima T8 KZ8A and 119 Prima M4 KZ4AT electric locomotives. The first passenger locomotive should be ready by the end of 2019 and then certified as new and premiere product "Made in Kazakhstan".
