= SNCF Class BB 66700 =

Class of centre cab diesel locomotives rebuilt from the earlier Class BB 66000

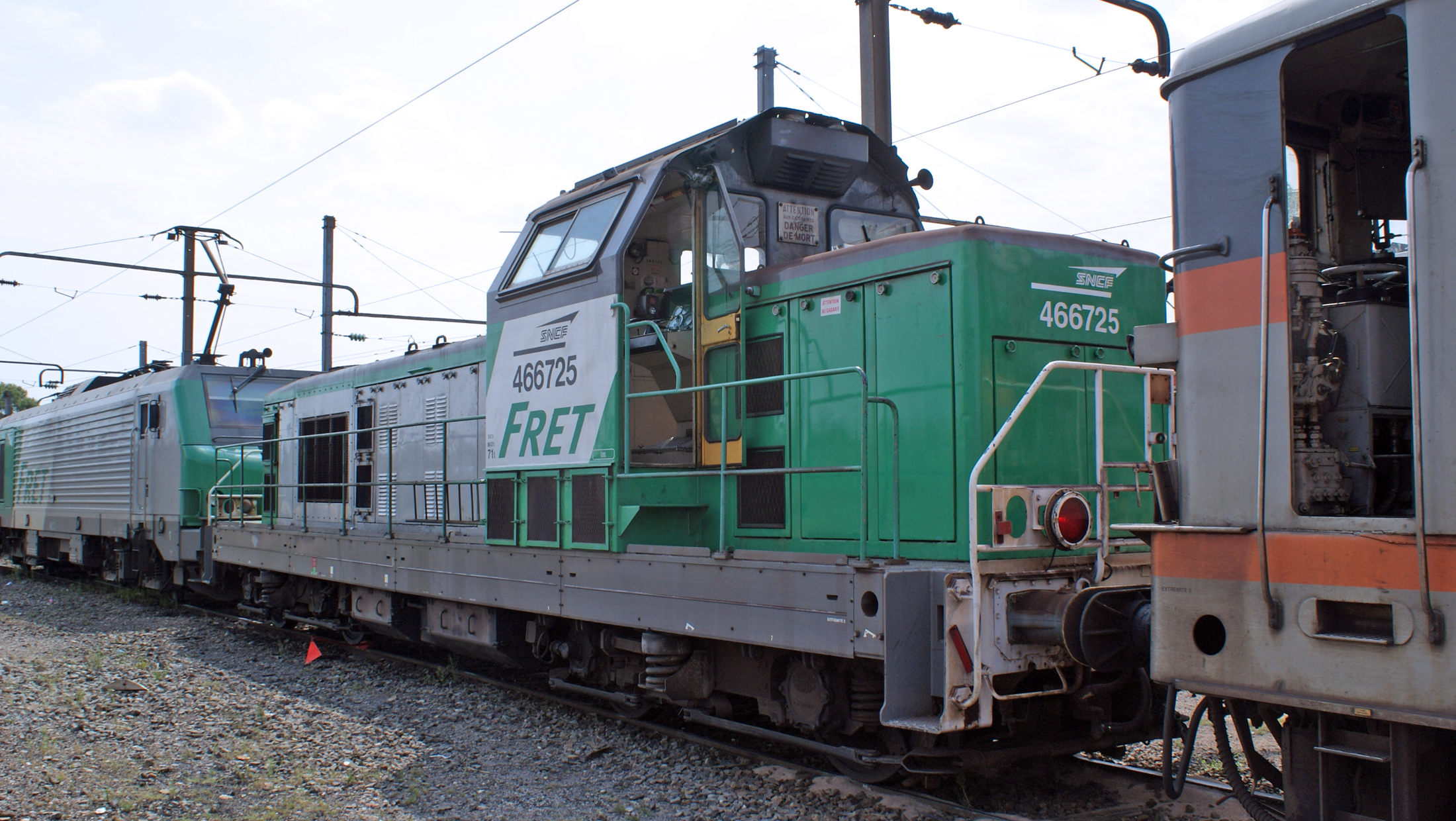
- BB 66725 at Lens-Méricourt dépôt
Type and origin
- Power type: Diesel-electric
- Builder: CAFL/CEM/Alsthom/Fives-Lille
- Build date: 1985
Specifications
- Configuration
  - UIC: Bo-Bo
  - Commonwealth: Bo-Bo
- Gauge: 1,435 mm (4 ft 8 1/2 in)
- Wheel diameter: 1,100 mm (43 in)
- Length: 14.898 m (48 ft 10.5 in)
- Loco weight: 71 t (70 long tons; 78 short tons)
- Fuel type: Diesel
- Prime mover: MGO V16BSHR
- Train heating: ETH
Performance figures
- Maximum speed: 90 km/h (56 mph)
- Power output: 1,030 kW (1,380 hp)
- Tractive effort: 167 kN (38,000 lb_{f})
Career
- Operators: SNCF
- Class: BB 66700
- Number in class: 34
- Numbers: BB 66701–BB 66734

The SNCF Class BB 66700 is a class of centre cab diesel locomotives rebuilt from the earlier Class BB 66000. They were regeared and had ballast weights added at Nevers depot to enable them to deal with heavier freight wagons. 34 locomotives were converted between 1985 and 1989.

== Fleet List ==
Number	Rebuilt from	Notes
BB 66701	BB 66146	
BB 66702	BB 66080	
BB 66703	BB 66166	
BB 66704	BB 66174	
BB 66705	BB 66152	
BB 66706	BB 66172	
BB 66707	BB 66176	
BB 66708	BB 66178	
BB 66709	BB 66148	
BB 66710	BB 66134	
BB 66711	BB 66158	
BB 66712	BB 66144	
BB 66713	BB 66139	
BB 66714	BB 66143	
BB 66715	BB 66081	
BB 66716	BB 66177	
BB 66717	BB 66149	
BB 66718	BB 66173	
BB 66719	BB 66076	
BB 66720	BB 66074	
BB 66721	BB 66136	
BB 66722	BB 66138	Preserved at Train touristique Étretat-Pays de Caux, Les Loges
BB 66723	BB 66137	
BB 66724	BB 66087	
BB 66725	BB 66179	
BB 66726	BB 66141	
BB 66727	BB 66154	
BB 66728	BB 66123	
BB 66729	BB 66119	
BB 66730	BB 66155	
BB 66731	BB 66181	
BB 66732	BB 66159	
BB 66733	BB 66133	
BB 66734	BB 66180	
