= SNCF Class BB 69400 =

SNCF BB 69400
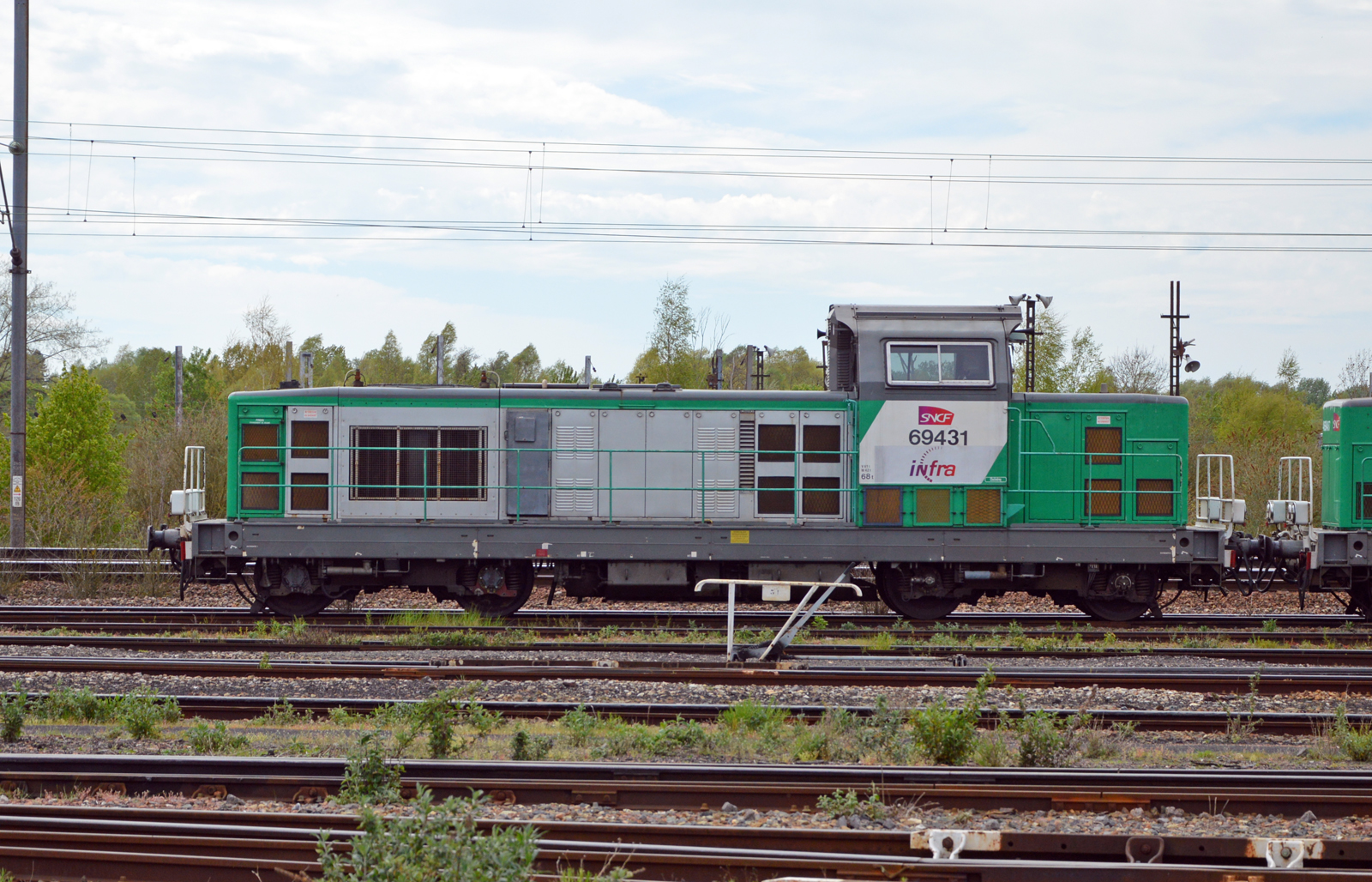
- BB 69431 at Longueau
Type and origin
- Power type: Diesel
- Builder: (France) CAFL (France) Alsthom (France) Compagnie Électro-Mécanique (France) SACM (France) Fives-Lille (France) Socofer (refurbishment)
- Build date: 1968-1971 (original); 2004-2010 (refurbishment)
- Total produced: 64 (2008)
Specifications
- Configuration
  - UIC: Bo-Bo
- Gauge: 1,435 mm (4 ft 8 1/2 in)
- Length: 14.97 m (49 ft 1.4 in)
- Fuel type: Diesel
- Prime mover: MTU 12V 4000 R41
- Engine type: V12 Diesel
- Traction motors: 4x Alsthom TA 648 A1
- Transmission: Electric
- Loco brake: pneumatic (TDL)
- Safety systems: Crocodile, KVB
Performance figures
- Maximum speed: 120 km/h (75 mph)
- Power output: 1,040 kW (1,390 hp)
- Tractive effort: 167 kN (38,000 lb_{f})
Career
- Operators: SNCF-FRET
- Class: BB 69400
- Number in class: 64
- Numbers: 69403-69506 (with gaps)
- First run: 2004
- Disposition: in service

The SNCF BB 69400 are a class of diesel locomotives resulting from the renovation and re-engining of members of class BB 66400 between 2004 and 2005 for the freight sector, Fret, of SNCF.

== Rebuilding ==
The original MGO V16BSHR engines were replaced with MTU 12V 4000 R41 units. The re-engineering of the BB 69400 was an opportunity to review the ergonomics of the driving stations with the integration of standardized equipment and soundproofing of the cabin. Cabin air conditioning was installed utilising a 7.80 kW Soprano unit.

== Livery ==
In addition to the Fret livery worn by these locomotives since their conversion, the BB 69400 allocated to the infrastructure sector, Infra, since 2015, have been repainted in the latter's yellow and grey livery.

== Fleet list and dépôt allocation ==
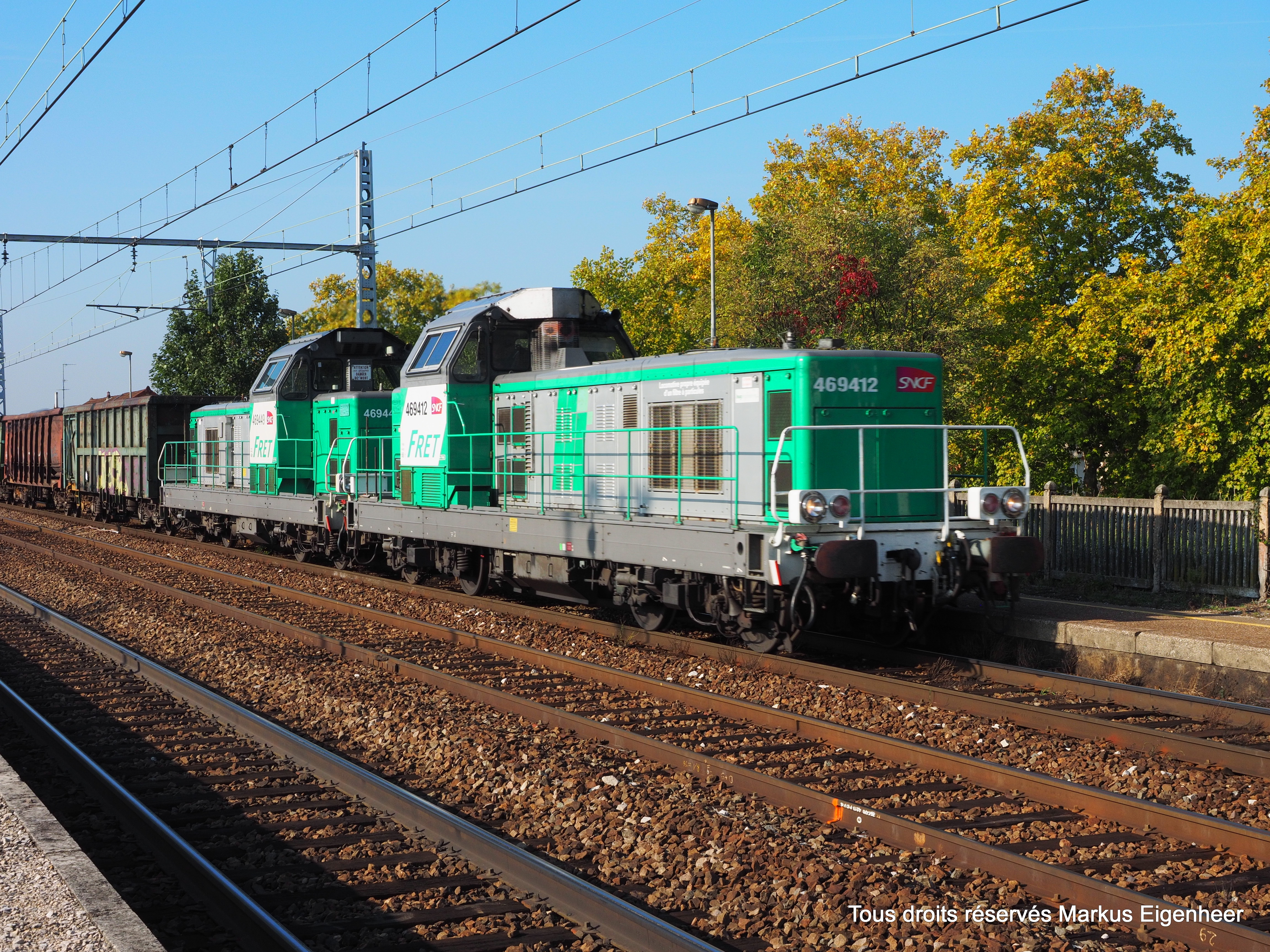
2 BB 69400s in Fret livery

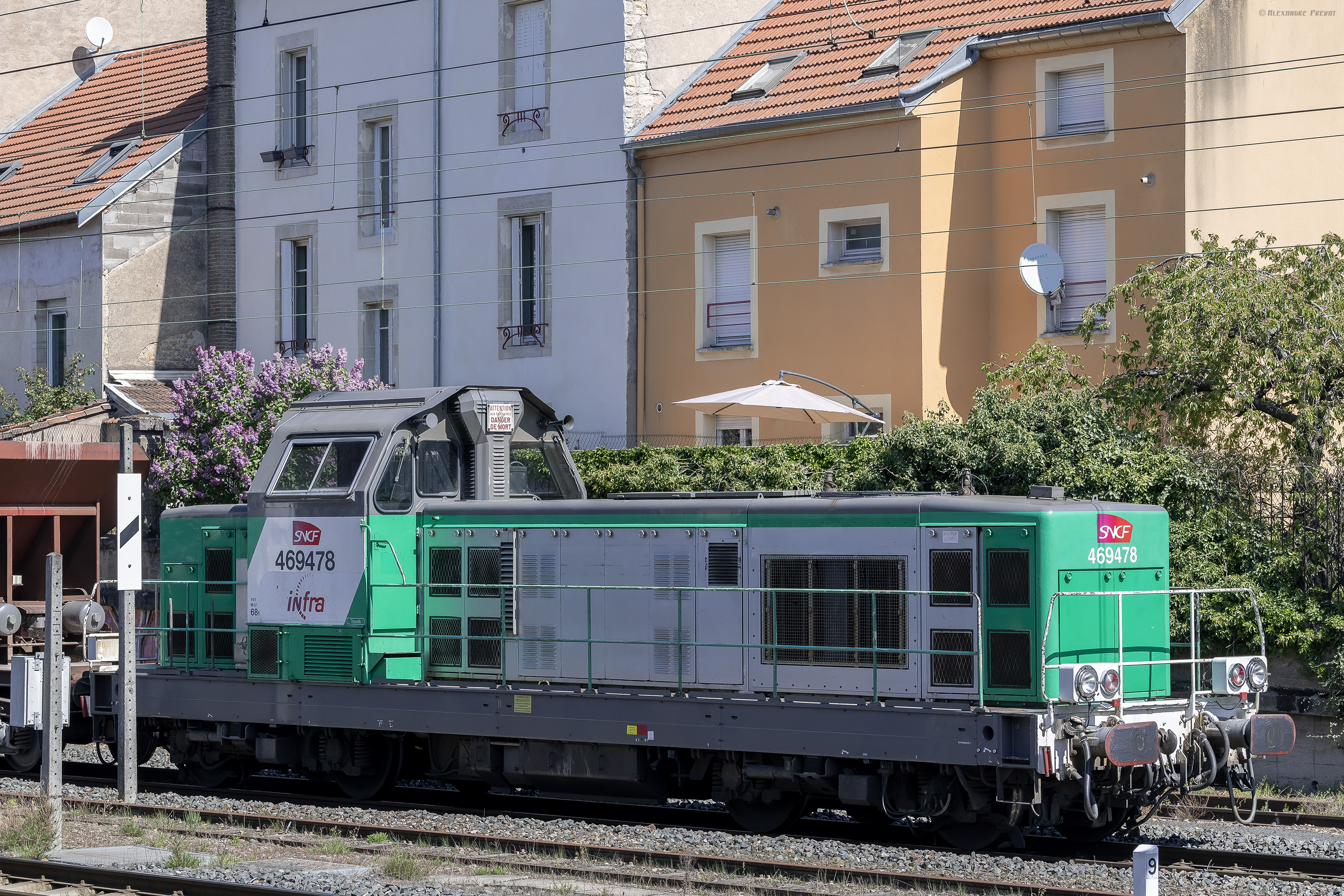
A BB 69400 in Fret livery with Infra branding

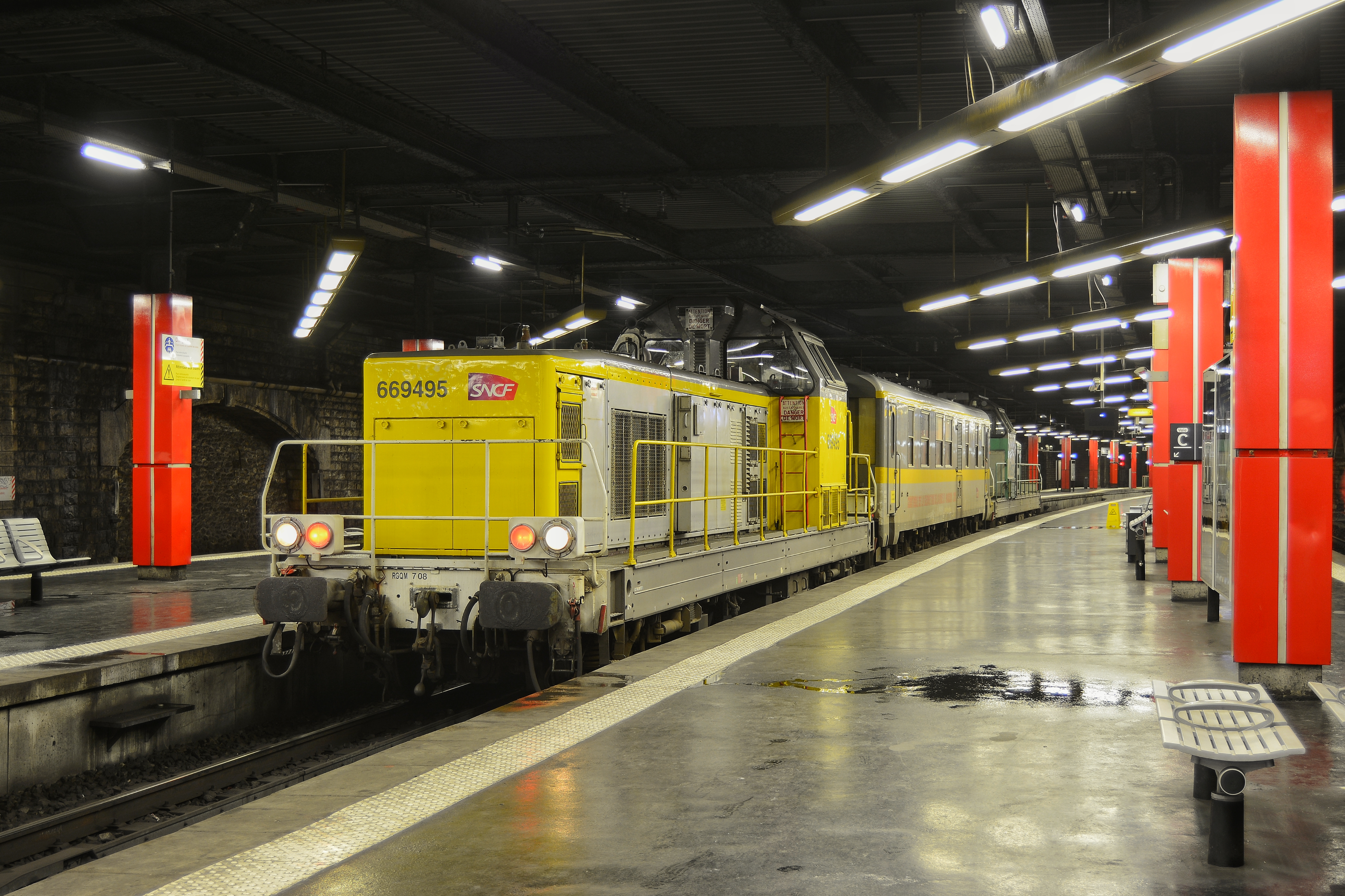
A BB 69400 in Infra livery on RER line C in Paris

Allocation as of 1 January 2019

Number	Converted from	Withdrawn	Livery	Dépôt
69402	Ex 66402	20 December 2017	Fret	/
69403	Ex 66403	/	Fret	Longueau
69409	Ex 66409	/	Fret	Longueau
69410	Ex 66410	/	Fret	Longueau
69412	Ex 66412	30 September 2016	Fret	/
69413	Ex 66413	/	Fret	Longueau
69414	Ex 66414	/	Infra	Longueau
69415	Ex 66415	/	Fret	Longueau
69416	Ex 66416	/	Fret	Longueau
69418	Ex 66418	/	Fret	Longueau
69419	Ex 66419	30 September 2016	Fret	/
69420	Ex 66420	30 September 2016	Fret	/
69421	Ex 66421	26 June 2018	Fret	/
69422	Ex 66422	/	Fret	Longueau
69423	Ex 66423	/	Fret	Longueau
69424	Ex 66424	/	Fret	Longueau
69425	Ex 66425	/	Fret	Longueau
69426	Ex 66426	/	Fret	Chalindrey
69427	Ex 66427	/	Fret	Longueau
69428	Ex 66428	/	Fret	Longueau
69430	Ex 66430	/	Fret	Longueau
69431	Ex 66431	/	Fret	Longueau
69432	Ex 66432	26 June 2018	Fret	/
69433	Ex 66433	/	Fret	Longueau
69434	Ex 66434	30 September 2016	Fret	/
69436	Ex 66436	26 June 2018	Fret	/
69437	Ex 66437	/	Fret	Longueau
69438	Ex 66438	/	Fret	Chalindrey
69439	Ex 66439	/	Infra	Longueau
69440	Ex 66440	/	Fret	Chalindrey
69441	Ex 66441	/	Fret	Longueau
69443	Ex 66443	/	Fret	Chalindrey
69444	Ex 66444	/	Fret	Chalindrey
69446	Ex 66446	/	Fret	Chalindrey
69447	Ex 66447	/	Fret	Chalindrey
69448	Ex 66448	/	Fret	Chalindrey
69449	Ex 66449	26 June 2018	Fret	/
69451	Ex 66451	/	Fret	Chalindrey
69452	Ex 66452	/	Fret	Chalindrey
69453	Ex 66453	/	Fret	Chalindrey
69454	Ex 66454	/	Fret	Chalindrey
69458	Ex 66458	/	Fret	Chalindrey
69461	Ex 66461	/	Fret	Chalindrey
69464	Ex 66464	/	Fret	Chalindrey
69465	Ex 66465	/	Fret	Chalindrey
69466	Ex 66466	/	Fret	Chalindrey
69470	Ex 66470	/	Fret	Chalindrey
69472	Ex 66472	/	Infra	Chalindrey
69473	Ex 66473	/	Fret	Chalindrey
69474	Ex 66474	/	Fret	Chalindrey
69475	Ex 66475	20 December 2017	Fret	/
69476	Ex 66476	26 June 2018	Fret	/
69477	Ex 66477	/	Fret	Longueau
69478	Ex 66478	/	Fret	Longueau
69480	Ex 66480	/	Infra	Chalindrey
69481	Ex 66481	/	Fret	Longueau
69482	Ex 66482	/	Fret	Longueau
69483	Ex 66483	/	Fret	Chalindrey
69484	Ex 66484	/	Fret	Chalindrey
69485	Ex 66485	/	Fret	Chalindrey
69486	Ex 66486	/	Fret	Chalindrey
69487	Ex 66487	/	Fret	Chalindrey
69488	Ex 66488	/	Fret	Longueau
69489	Ex 66489	/	Infra	Longueau
69490	Ex 66490	/	Fret	Longueau
69491	Ex 66491	/	Fret	Longueau
69492	Ex 66492	/	Infra	Longueau
69493	Ex 66493	/	Fret	Longueau
69494	Ex 66494	/	Fret	Longueau
69495	Ex 66495	/	Infra	Chalindrey
69496	Ex 66496	26 June 2018	Fret	/
69498	Ex 66498	/	Fret	Chalindrey
69499	Ex 66499	26 June 2018	Fret	/
69505	Ex 66505	/	Fret	Longueau
69506	Ex 66506	/	Fret	Longueau

== Preservation ==
The following locomotives have been preserved:

- BB 69421 : Train à vapeur en Limousin.
- BB 69432 : Matériel Ferroviaire Patrimoine National.
- BB 69436 : Agrivap: Les trains de la découverte.
- BB 69449 : Amicale des Anciens et Amis de la Traction Vapeur, à Montluçon (03).
- BB 69499 : Train à vapeur du Limousin.
