= SNCF Class BB 37000 =

Locomotives with triple the voltage Class BB 27000

Class BB37000
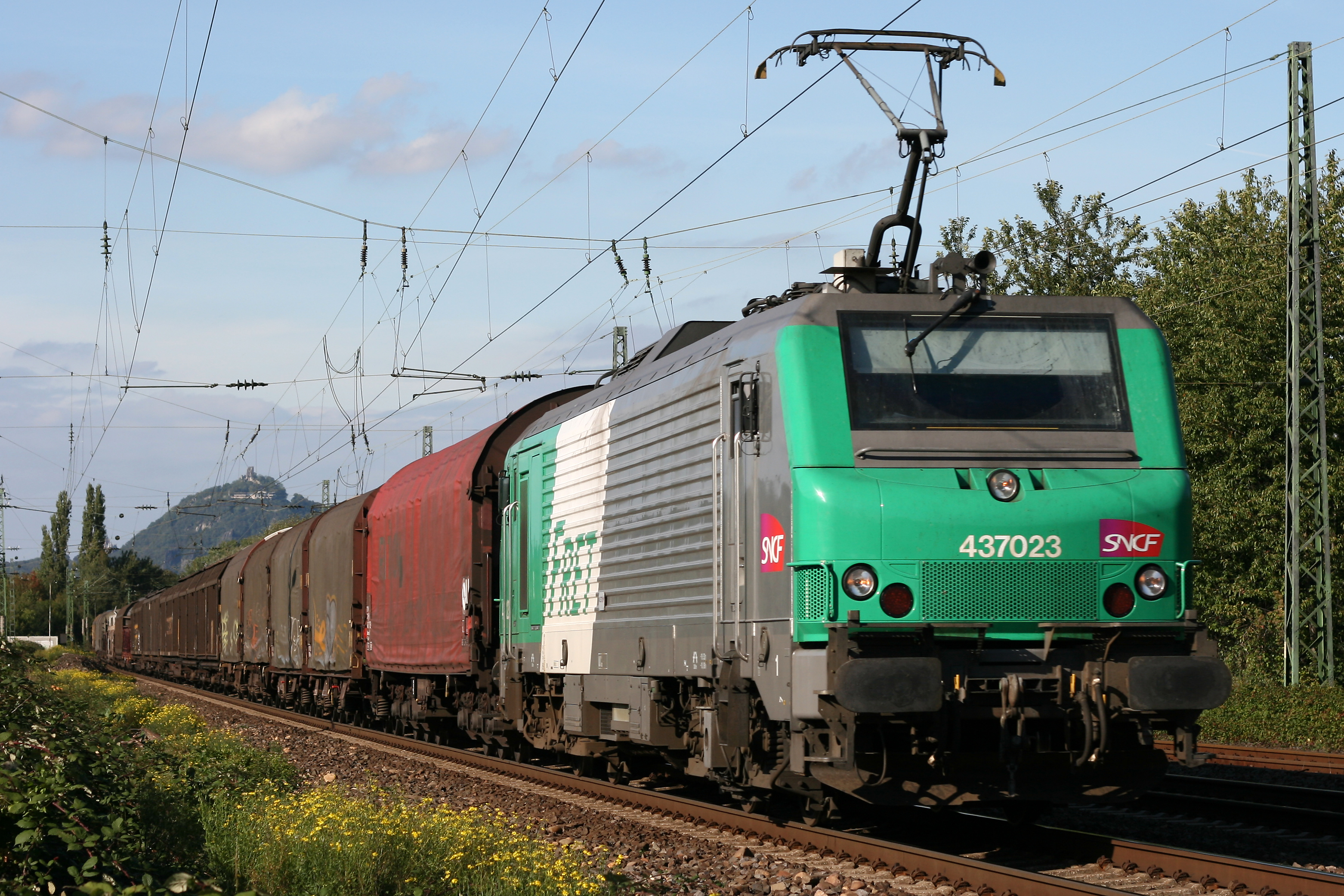
- SNCF Fret locomotive 37023 at Unkel
Type and origin
- Power type: Electric
- Builder: Alstom
- Build date: 2004
- Total produced: 60
Specifications
- Configuration
  - UIC: Bo′Bo′
- Gauge: 1,435 mm (4 ft 8 1/2 in) standard gauge
- Length: 19.72 m (64 ft 8 in)
- Adhesive weight: 22.5 tonnes (22.1 long tons; 24.8 short tons)
- Loco weight: 90 tonnes (89 long tons; 99 short tons)
- Electric system/s: Catenary; 1.5 kV DC; 15 kV 16.7 Hz AC; 25 kV 50 Hz AC
- Current pickup: Pantograph
Performance figures
- Maximum speed: 140 km/h (87 mph)
- Power output: 4,200 kW (5,600 hp)
Career
- Operators: SNCF/Fret
- Class: BB37000
- Number in class: 59 (as of 2007)
- Numbers: 370001–37006, 37008–37060
- Disposition: One retired, remainder in service

The SNCF Class BB 37000 "Prima" electric locomotives are currently being built by Alstom. These locomotives are the triple-voltage version of the Class BB 27000. Sixty of these locomotives, numbered 37001–37060, have been ordered by Fret SNCF for international freight traffic. 37007 was destroyed in the Zoufftgen train accident on 11 October 2006.

== Names ==
- 37039 - Custines/Böbingen

== Gallery ==
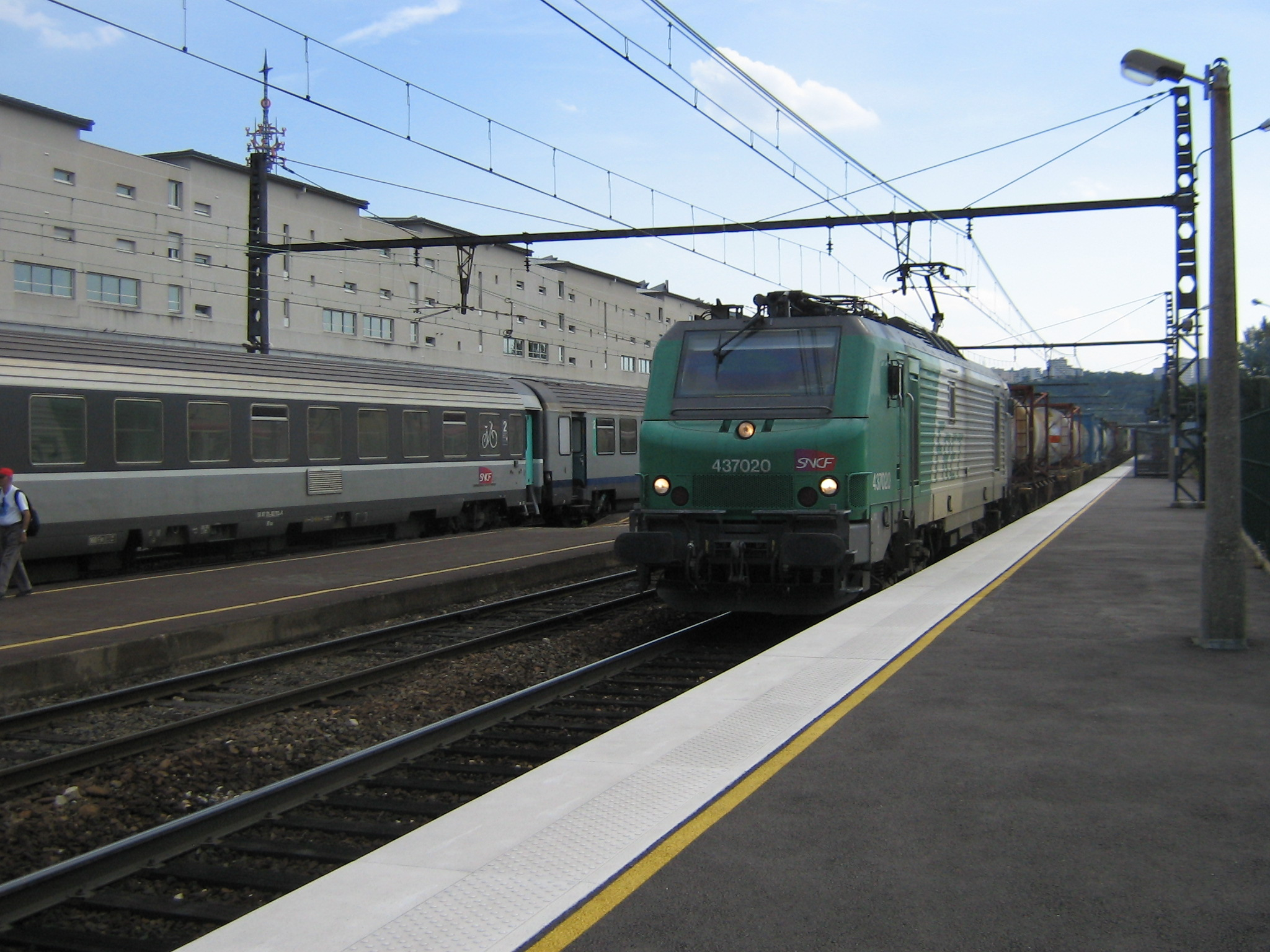
437020 passing through Lyon Vaise station.
