= SNCF Class BB 67300 =

Class of 90 French B′B′ diesel-electric locomotives

Class BB 67300
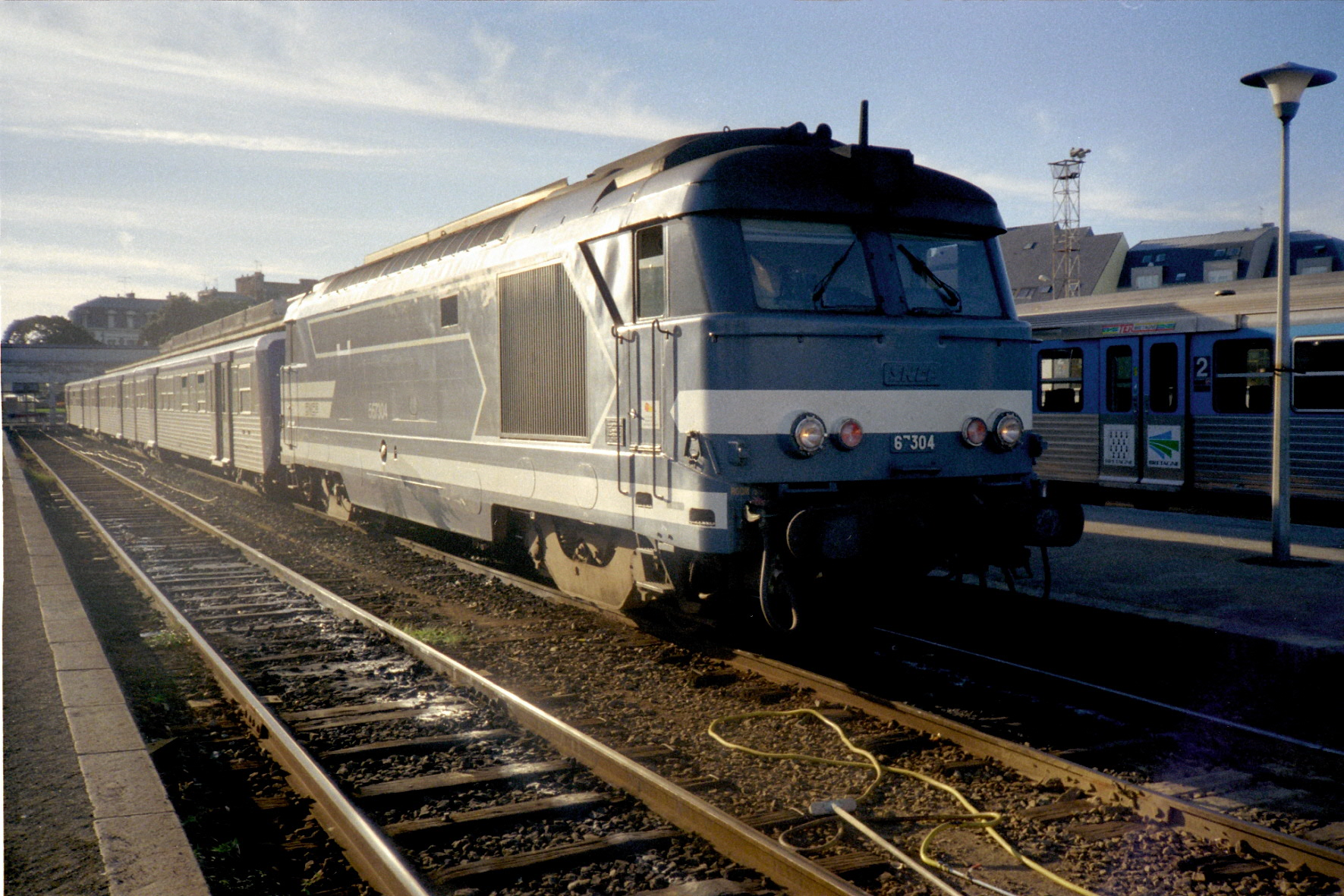
- BB 67304 at Saint-Malo on 1 September 2001.
Type and origin
- Power type: Diesel
- Builder: (France) Brissonneau and Lotz
- Build date: 1967-1979
- Total produced: 90
Specifications
- Configuration
  - AAR: B-B
- Gauge: 1,435 mm (4 ft 8 1/2 in) standard gauge
- Length: 17.090 m (56 ft 7/8 in)
- Adhesive weight: 10 t (9.8 long tons; 11.0 short tons)
- Loco weight: 80 t (78.7 long tons; 88.2 short tons)
- Fuel type: Diesel
- Prime mover: SEMT Pielstick 16 PA 4
- Engine type: V16 Diesel
- Traction motors: 2 SW 9209
- Cylinders: 16
- Transmission: Electrical
Performance figures
- Maximum speed: 140 km/h (87 mph)
- Power output: 1,440 kW (1,930 hp)
Career
- Operators: SNCF
- Class: BB67300
- Number in class: 87 (at 2005)
- Numbers: 67301-67390
- First run: 5 December 1967

The Class BB 67300 is a group of diesel locomotives used by SNCF. They were built by Brissonneau and Lotz between 1967 and 1969.

A development of the BB 67000 class of diesel engines fitted with electric train heating and three-phase transmission. Designed as a mixed traffic loco, twenty were fitted for push-pull operation.

== Names ==
One member of the class was named: BB 67348 La Bernerie-en-Retz.

== See also ==
- TCDD DE 24 000
- Alstom AD24C
