= Alstom Prima =

Diesel and electric locomotive family

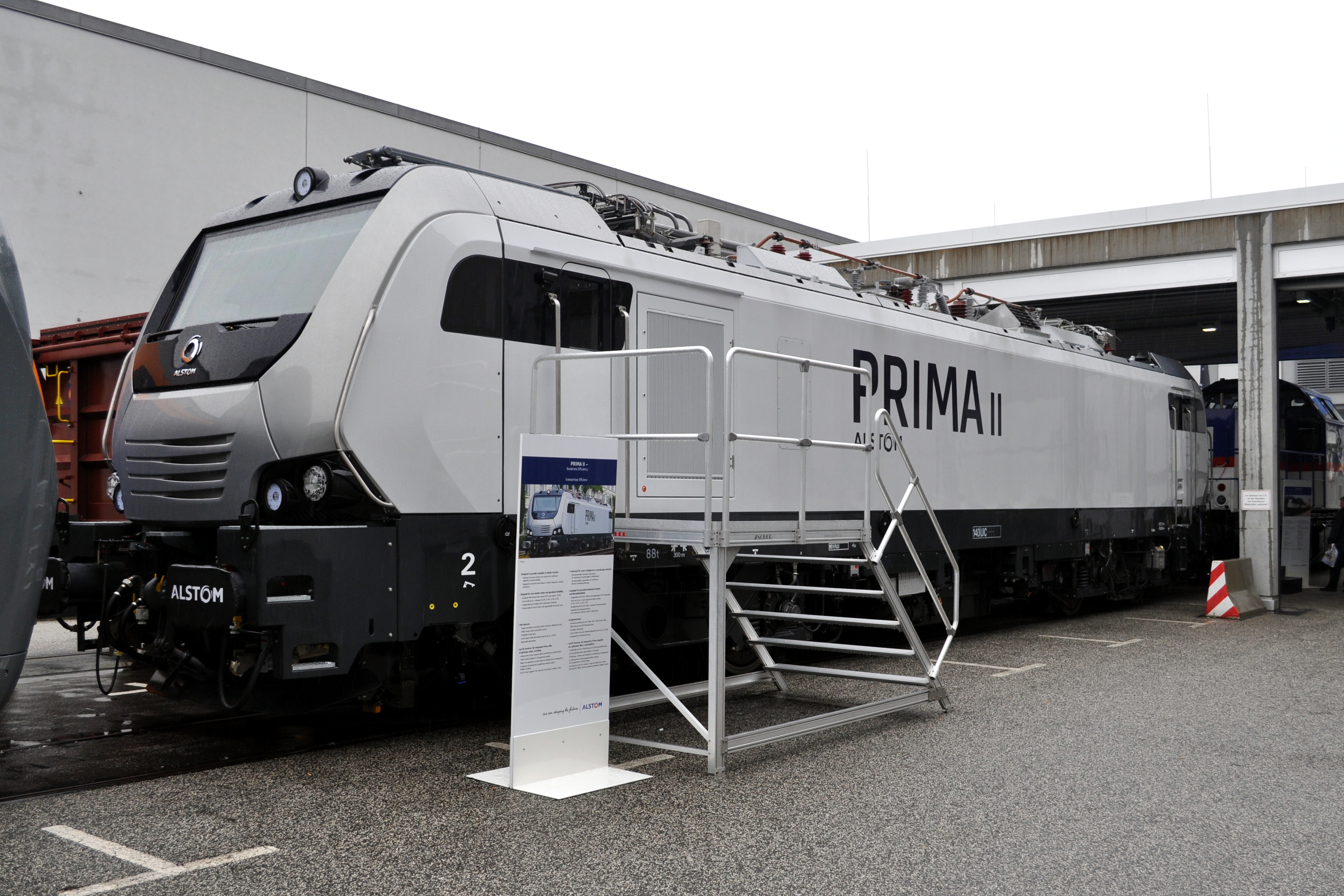
Alstom Prima II on display at InnoTrans 2014 in Berlin

Prima is a family of railway diesel and electric locomotives built by Alstom. Manufacture of the type commenced in the late 1990s. By 2008, Alstom had reportedly sold 1,750 Prima locomotives. The second generation Prima II was launched in 2009. The Prima H3 diesel/battery hybrid locomotive was launched in 2013.

The Alstom Prima was superseded by Alstom Traxx in the summer of 2023.

== First generation ==
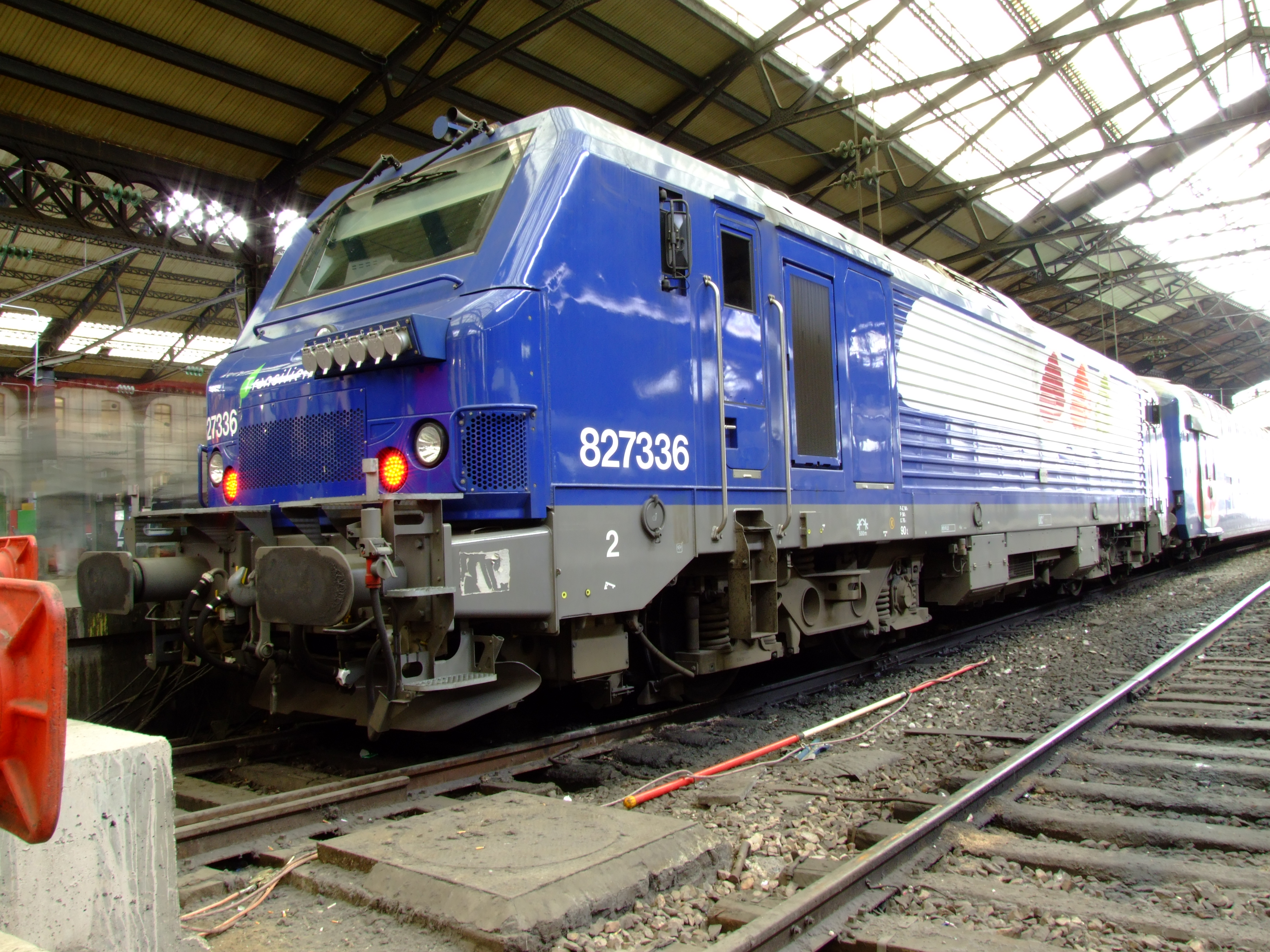
SNCF BB 27308 locomotive, a variant of the first generation Prima model

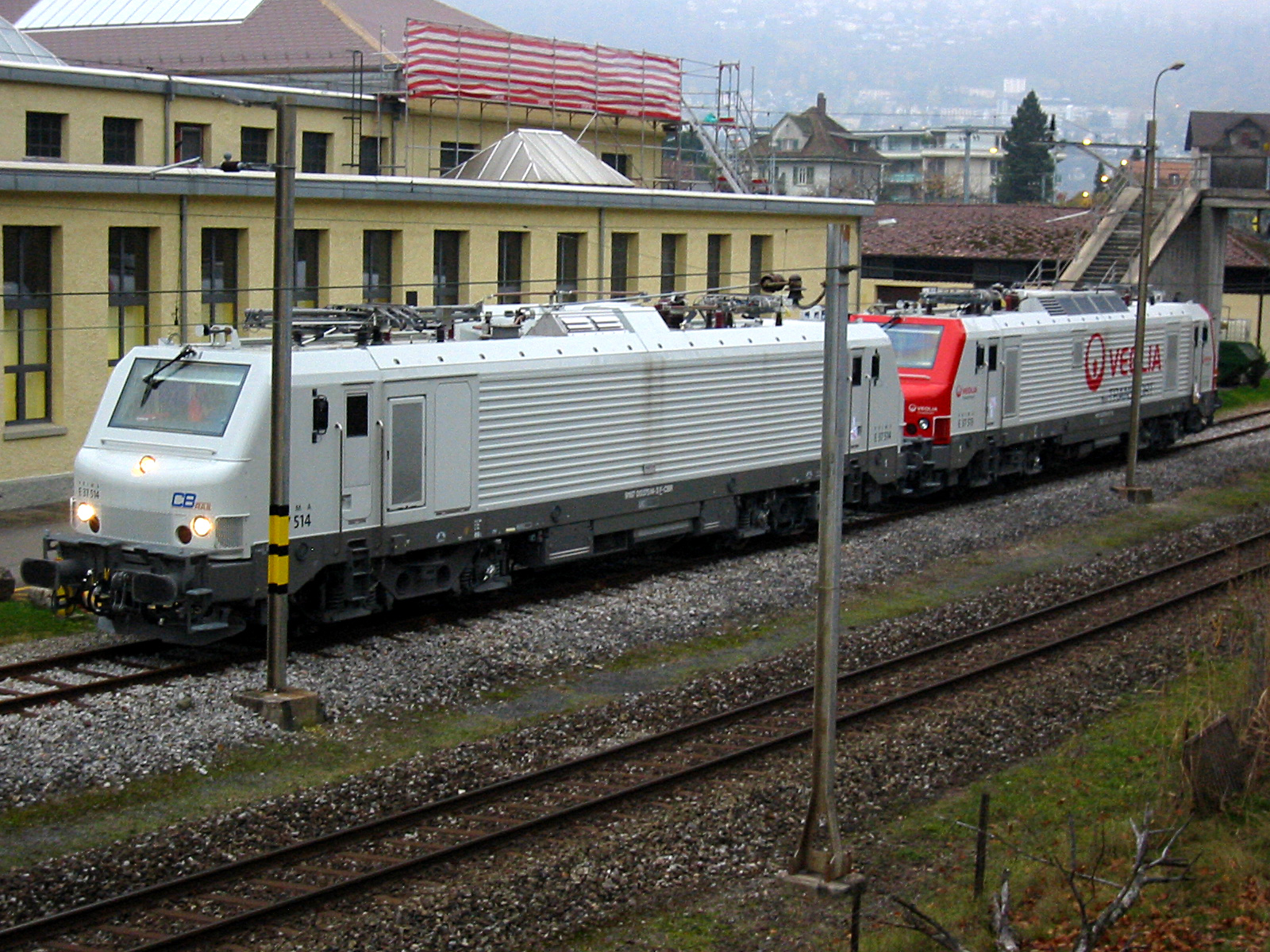
A pair of Prima locomotives

During 1998, the French national railway operator, SNCF, placed a large order with train manufacturer Alstom for 120 electric locomotives, which was later on increased to 240, to perform both domestic and international freight services. The company decided to develop a new modular platform that would accommodate the requirements not only of the existing SNCF order, but to also comply with European interoperability standards, as well as a high degree of flexibility as to meet the divergent needs of different operators, potentially increasing the type's international appeal. In this manner, the SNCF order can be attributed with the extension of the Prima locomotive range. The design of the electric models visibly shows a level of familiarity with the diesel-electric members of the family.

In 2002, Alstom constructed a single Prima demonstrator for the purpose of investigating modular solutions for the configuration of onboard equipment, cab, traction and other systems. During the following year, another Prima demonstrator, known as the multi-system Prima 6000, was built; this was originally to demonstrate to the SNCB what Alstom could produce for them; it was later used as a test platform for the European Rail Traffic Management System (ERTMS) and for as the new Prime II concept before being withdrawn in 2009.

Electric locomotives

- SNCF Class BB 27000
- SNCF Class BB 27300
- SNCF Class BB 37000
- SNCF Class BB 47000
- China Railways HXD2
- Belarusian Railway BCG-1

Diesel locomotives

- Alstom Prima diesel locomotives

== Second generation ==
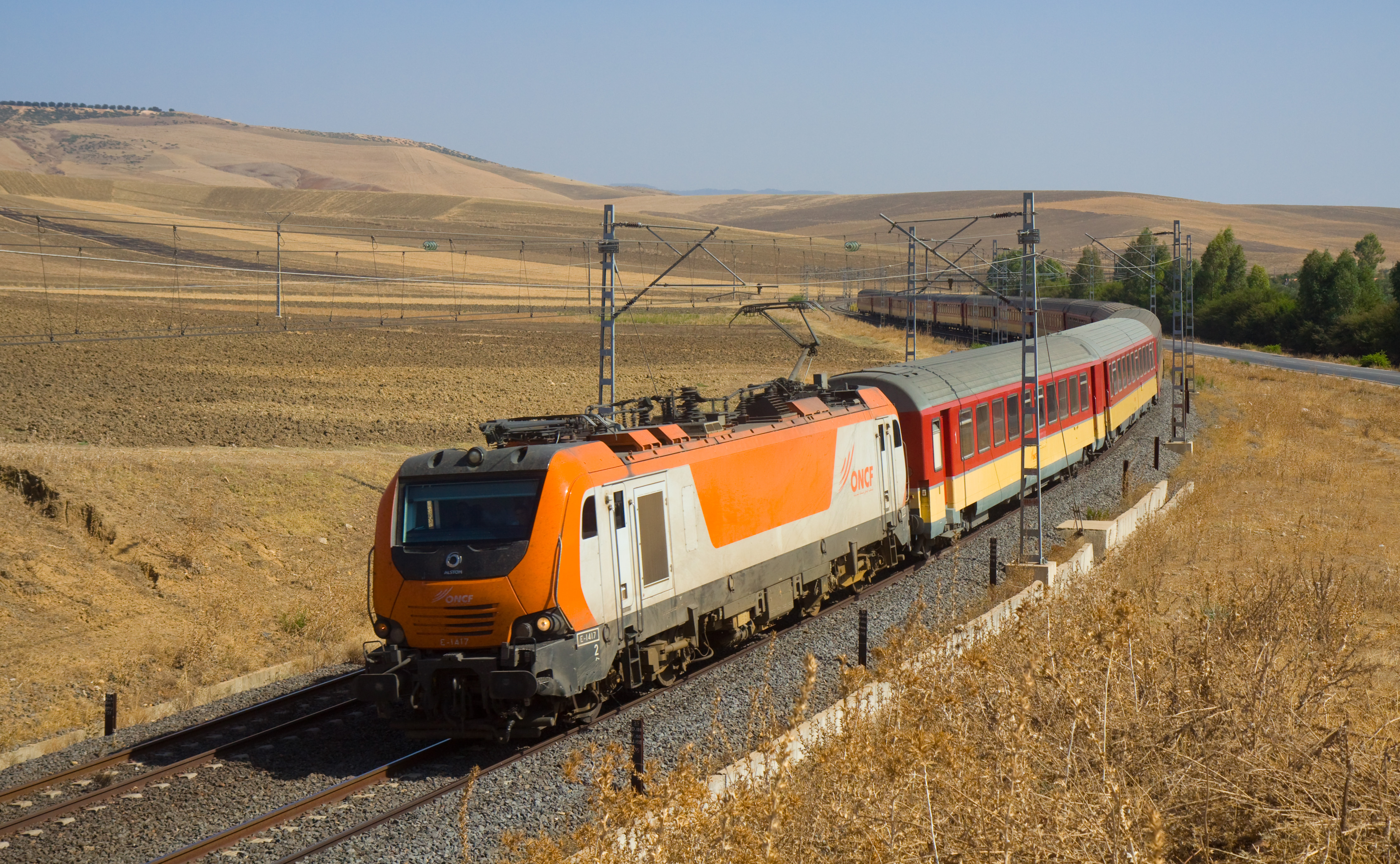
ONCFM E 1400 locomotive, a variant of the second-generation Prima model

On 20 May 2008, Alstom announced the details of a second generation of Prima locomotives, named "Prima II". The prototype was unveiled on 3 June 2009 at Alstom's Belfort plant. The locomotives are designed to be modular and reconfigurable to suit customers requirements throughout their lifetimes. Electric versions can work with up to four different overhead line voltages; 1.5 Kv and 3 kV DC, as well as 15 KV and 25 kV AC; it possesses power ratings of up to 6.4 MW (8,600 hp), (Note: Between 4.2 and 6.4 MW (5,600 and 8,600 hp) for 4 axle version, dependent upon supply voltage) and operating speeds of 140 to 200 km/h (87 to 124 mph). (Note: 140 km/h (87 mph) for freight,200 km/h (120 mph) for passenger version - a change of bogies is required for conversion between passenger and freight versions.)

The design also accommodates for broader gauge versions, suitable for use in Russia, India and Finland, which have been reportedly viewed by Alstom's sales department as potential markets for the Prima II. Compatibility with the ERTMS signalling system for European cross border operations is also a feature. Six-axle Co′Co′ versions are also proposed for heavy freight operations, along with an accompanying increase in power output to 9.6 MW (12,900 hp) and a top speed of 120 km/h (75 mph) A diesel version is also planned in the long term.

The first order for the second generation Prima II came from Morocco's national railway ONCFM, with an order in November 2007 for twenty electric locomotives. These are due to be delivered in the second half of 2009 for entry into passenger and freight service in 2010. The Moroccan locomotives are to be initially delivered for 3 kV DC operation, with the potential to install a transformer and other electrical equipment for 25 kV AC operation at a later date when Moroccan electrification upgrade schemes take place. ONCFM placed a follow-up order for 30 locomotives in February 2018.

During November 2015, Alstom received a Letter of Award from the Ministry of Indian Railways to supply Indian Railways with 800 double section freight electric locomotives in class WAG-12, along with associated long-term maintenance. The total contract, which is worth in excess of €3 billion, shall also involve the establishment of a new assembly plant at Madhepura, in Bihar, as well as two maintenance depots at Saharanpur, Uttar Pradesh and Nagpur, Maharashtra. The Prima locomotive for Indian Railways will be 9 MW (12,000 hp) at the wheel rim and will run at a speed up to 120 km/h.

Electric locomotives

- ONCFM E 1400
- Indian locomotive class WAG-12
- AZ4A
- Alstom KZ8A
- EP20

== Prima H3 ==
During August 2013, Alstom announced that it had launched development of the H3 diesel/battery hybrid locomotive. The Prima H3 is a diesel/battery hybrid locomotive, intended mainly for use as a shunter. The aim of the project is to demonstrate the feasibility of a hybrid shunting locomotive in daily use; it is an initiative of the Eco Rail Innovation (ERI) and is being supported by a total of 19 companies. Financing for the project includes €600,000 ($653,560 approximately) from the State of Bavaria. It was first publicly unveiled at InnoTrans 2014 in Berlin. Alstom's Stendal site in Scaxony-Anhalt, Germany, is responsible for manufacturing the locomotives.

The H3 locomotive is 12.8 meters long, 3.13 meters wide and 67 tonnes in weight. It has a maximum axle load of 22.5 t, can handle a minimum curve radius of 60 meters, and has a starting tractive effort of 240 kN. The design incorporates an integrated flexicoil suspension system and a hydraulic bogie coupling system, the latter being designed and supplied by Liebherr. The hybrid locomotive is designed for an operation lifespan of up to 40 years and has been certified for a maximum speed of 100 km/h on mainline railways. These speeds allow the type to operate within short-distance mainline traffic without causing undue disruption. Several different models have been developed, including the H3 Battery 600 kW electric locomotive, the H3 Hybrid 700 kW hybrid locomotive, the H3 Dual Engine 700 kW dual engine locomotive, and the H3 Single Engine 1,000 kW single-engine locomotive.

The H3 Battery model is provisioned with eight separate batteries which provide up to 600 kW, while the H3 Hybrid is instead equipped with a 350 kW generator and a 350 kW battery. The H3 Dual Engine variant is fitted with a pair of 350 kW diesel engine generators, and the H3 Single Engine features a 1,000 kW diesel engine. The latter three variants are each equipped with a 2,000 L fuel tank, while no fuel tank is present on the battery-only model. The first two H3 variants are designed to perform shunting operations in industrial areas and tunnels, while the third variant is designed for mainline services and industrial uses, and the fourth variant is designed for mainline services and heavy shunting operations.

In common operational practice, the locomotive initially runs on batteries alone; when not in active use, it is plugged in during breaks for recharging. When required, the batteries are charged via a small diesel engine driving a generator; only when the battery voltage is no longer sufficient to move the vehicles does the diesel generator automatically power up to recharge the batteries or to provide additional power. This diesel engine is rated at 350 kW and is Stage IIIB compliant; it produced lower emissions, as well as a considerable reduction in noise, in comparison to conventional diesel traction. According to Laug, Director of Production at DB Regio Franken in Nürnberg, the emissions are reduced by 70 percent, while fuel consumption has also been cut by 50 percent less to the traditional shunting locomotives, saving only 400 tons of CO_{2} per year. Reportedly, DB operates their fleet on pure battery running for between 50 and 75 percent of their overall operating time.

Since November 2016, a small fleet of five Alstom H3 hybrid locomotives have been deployed at railway stations of Nuremberg Central Station and Würzburg Hauptbahnhof. These locomotives are being used by Deutsche Bahn as part of an eight-year evaluation of the suitability of hybrids. In addition to Deutsche Bahn, several industrial users have also adopted the H3 in small numbers. Reportedly, by April 2017, a total of 19 Prima H3 hybrid locomotives are in service with Deutsche Bahn, Volkswagen, Audi, InfraLeuna, Mitteldeutsche Eisenbahn and Chemion Logistik.

== Operators ==
Prima

- China Railway
- SNCF and STIF (France)
- Israel Railways

Prima II

- ONCFM (Morocco)
- Indian Railways
- Azerbaijan Railways
- Kazakhstan Temir Zholy
