= SNCF Class BB 67000 =

Class of 124 French B′B′ diesel-electric locomotives

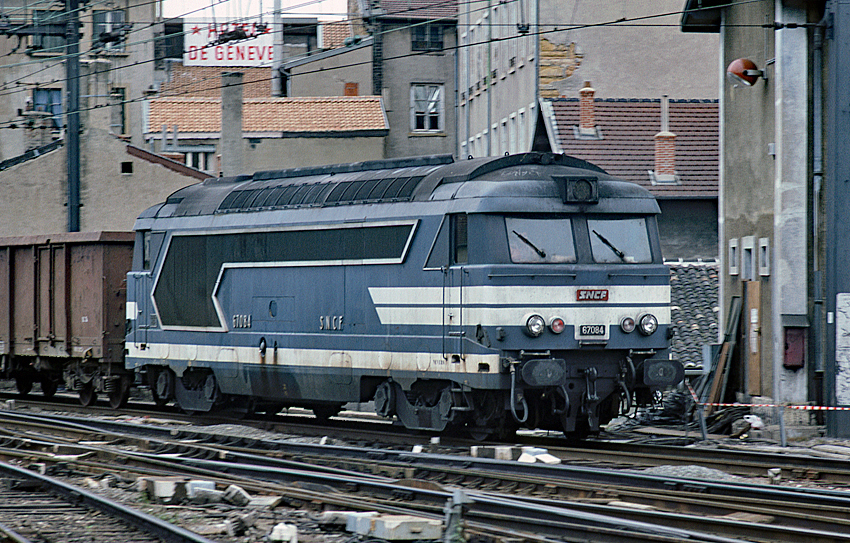
- 67084 at Lyon Perrache in 1982
Type and origin
- Power type: Diesel-electric
- Designer: Paul Arzens
- Builder: Brissonneau and Lotz
- Build date: 1963–1968
- Total produced: 124
Specifications
- Configuration
  - UIC: Bo′Bo′
- Gauge: 1,435 mm (4 ft 8 1/2 in) standard gauge
- Length: 17,090 mm (673 in)
- Loco weight: 80 t (79 long tons; 88 short tons)
- Prime mover: SEMT 16PA4
- Engine type: V16 Diesel
- Cylinders: 16
- Transmission: Electric
- Train heating: None
Performance figures
- Maximum speed: 90 km/h (56 mph); 130 km/h (81 mph)
- Power output: 1,470 kW (1,970 hp)
- Tractive effort: 304 kN (68,000 lb_{f}); 202 kN (45,000 lb_{f})
Career
- Operators: SNCF
- Class: BB 67000
- Numbers: 67001–67124

The Class BB 67000 are diesel locomotives in service with the SNCF ("French National Railway Company") from the 1960s.

== History ==
The first of the big diesels introduced by SNCF in the 1960s to replace steam locomotives and an early example of Paul Arzens' styling. The class was originally designated as mixed traffic locomotives with the bogies geared accordingly. Later they were allocated to freight work only and the gearing adjusted. They were never fitted with train heating boilers but worked with boiler vans on passenger duties. Thirty members of the class were rebuilt to class BB 67200 specifications between 1980 and 1984 to work ballast trains on the LGV network. 67036 became the prototype ETH locomotive and renumbered 67291. This was the prototype for the BB 67300 class and sixteen of the original locomotives were rebuilt to the latter specification.

== Technical details ==
The locomotive is powered by a V16 90 degree 2400 bhp diesel engine. The engine runs at 1500 rpm, displacing 90.5 L (5,520 cu in).
