= SNCF Class BB 66000 =

Class of 318 French centre-cab diesel locomotives

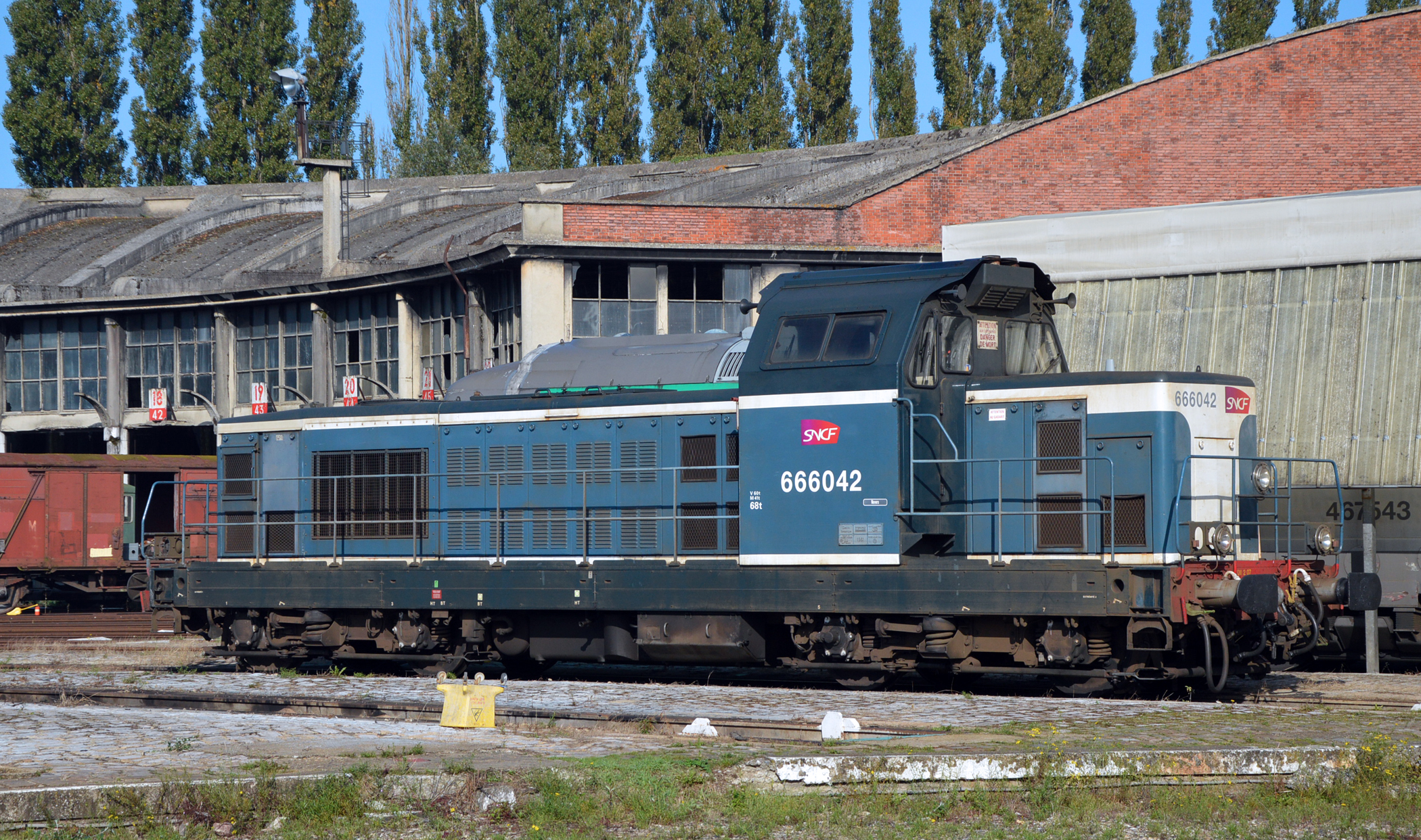
- BB 66042 at Longueau
Type and origin
- Power type: Diesel-electric
- Builder: CAFL/CEM/Alsthom/Fives-Lille/SACM
- Build date: 1960–1968
- Total produced: 318
Specifications
- Configuration
  - Commonwealth: Bo-Bo
- Gauge: 1,435 mm (4 ft 8 1/2 in)
- Wheel diameter: 1,100 mm (43 in)
- Length: 14.898 m (48.88 ft)
- Loco weight: 66–67 t (65–66 long tons; 73–74 short tons)
- Prime mover: MGO V16BSHR
- Transmission: Electric
- MU working: Yes
Performance figures
- Maximum speed: 120 km/h (75 mph)
- Power output: 1,030 kW (1,380 hp)
- Tractive effort: 167 kN (38,000 lb_{f})
Career
- Operators: SNCF
- Number in class: 318
- Numbers: BB 66001–BB 66318
- Locale: France

The SNCF Class BB 66000 is a class of 318 centre cab diesel locomotives built for SNCF by a consortium of CAFL, CEM, Alsthom, Fives-Lille and SACM between 1960 and 1968.

== Description ==
Numbered from BB 66001 to BB 66318, the locomotives were 14.898 m (48.88 ft) long and weighed 66–67 t (65–66 long tons; 73–74 short tons). Powered by an MGO V16BSHR diesel engine developing 1,030 kW (1,380 hp), they had a maximum speed of 120 km/h (75 mph). They were intended for shunting and trip working. Though designed as a mixed traffic locomotive, they had no provision for train heating and could be seen working with boiler vans on passenger services. With the general introduction of electric train heating they were relegated to freight work.

Under the original SNCF numbering scheme the first 80 locomotives were numbered 040 DG 1 to 040 DG 81.

== Incidents ==
- BB 66010 was withdrawn after a head-on collision on 15/10/81 with BB 67622.
- BB 66132 was withdrawn after a collision on 29/09/73 with BB 66126 at Trappes.
- BB 66247 was withdrawn after a fire on 12/01/1988, at St Denis-Jargeau.

== Rebuilds ==
11 members of the class were rebuilt in the early 60s with a more powerful engine and designated Class BB 66600.

Between 1985 and 1989, 34 locomotives were regeared for higher tractive effort and designated as Class BB 66700.

From 2004 some 91 members of the class were rebuilt with new MTU engines and reclassified as BB 69200.

== Preservation ==
9 examples have been preserved:

- BB 66001 : Preserved at Cité du train, Mulhouse
- BB 66014 : Preserved at Clermont-Ferrand
- BB 66019 : Preserved at Écomusée du haut-pays et des transports, Breil-sur-Roya
- BB 66099 : Preserved at Train du pays Cathare et du Fenouillèdes
- BB 66105 : Preserved at Train du pays Cathare et du Fenouillèdes
- BB 66110 : Preserved by Meccoli
- BB 66130 : Preserved at Train du pays Cathare et du Fenouillèdes
- BB 66252 : Chemin de fer touristique du Vermandois
- BB 66304 : Preserved at Toulouse
