= SNCF Class BB 27000 =

Class BB 27000
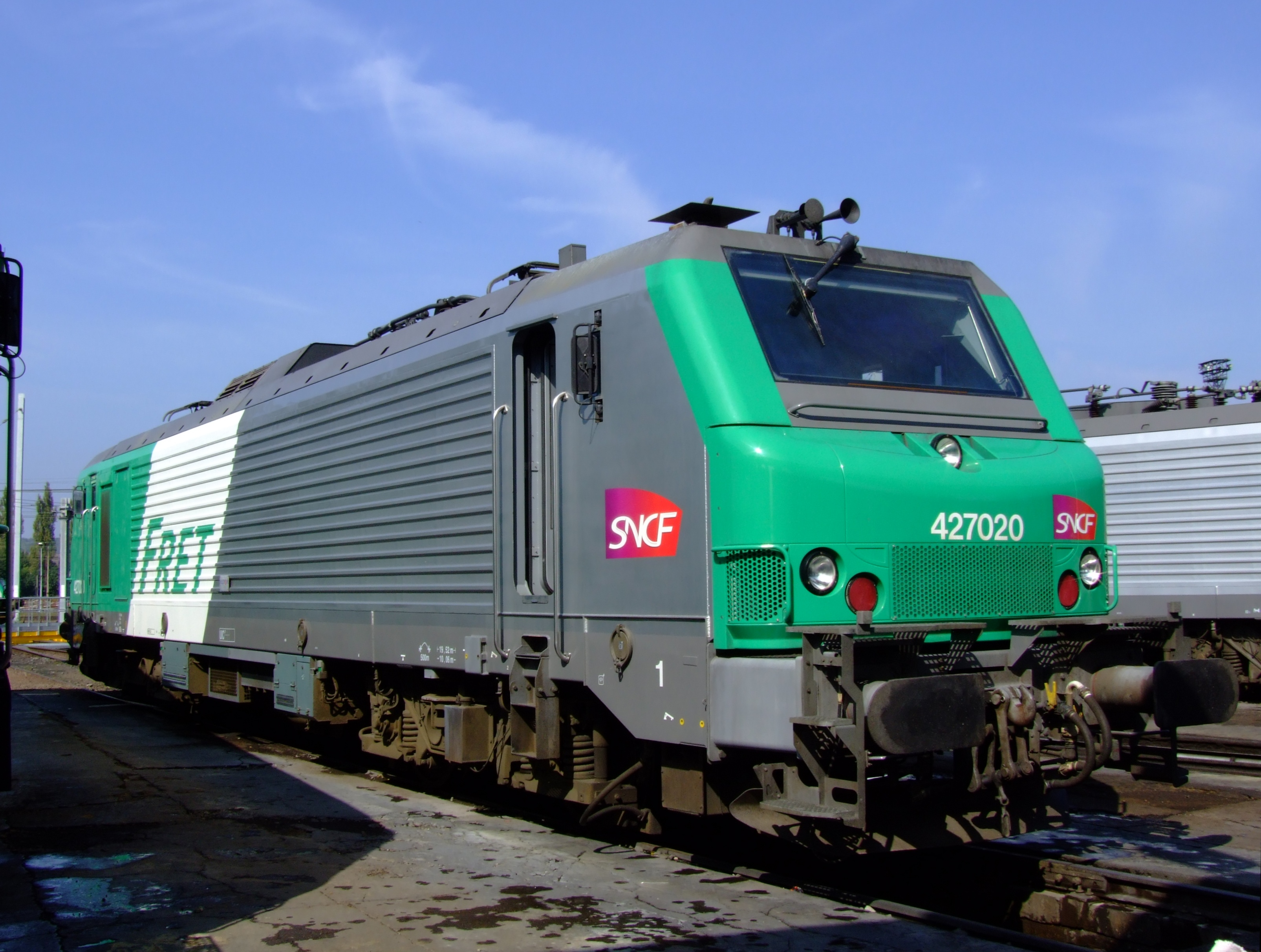
Type and origin
- Power type: Electric
- Builder: Alstom
- Build date: 2002–2006
- Total produced: 180
Specifications
- Configuration
  - UIC: Bo′Bo′
- Gauge: 1,435 mm (4 ft 8 1/2 in) standard gauge
- Length: 19.72 m (64 ft 8 in)
- Adhesive weight: 11.25 t (24,800 lb)
- Loco weight: 90 t (200,000 lb)
- Electric system/s: Overhead line: 25 kV 50 Hz AC; 1,500 V DC
- Current pickup: Pantograph
Performance figures
- Maximum speed: 140 km/h (87 mph)
- Power output: 4,200 kW (5,600 hp)
Career
- Operators: Fret SNCF
- Number in class: 180
- Numbers: 27001–27180
- Locale: France
- Delivered: 2002–2006
- Disposition: In service

The SNCF Class BB 27000 "Prima" electric locomotives were built by Alstom between 2001–2005. These are dual-voltage freight-only locomotives; they are not fitted with a 1500 V DC electrical line for train heating and accessories. One hundred and eighty of the locomotives, numbered 27001–27180, were built for Fret SNCF, for use on freight traffic. Their introduction led to the withdrawal of several elderly electric types, including Classes CC 7000, CC 7100, BB 8100 and BB 12000. They have also made significant inroads into Classes CC 6500, BB 8500, BB 16500 and BB 25500.

They can be seen largely in North and Eastern France and the lines through Dijon to Lyon, and the lines to Rouen and Caen.

== Names ==
- 27001 - Port Autonome de Marseille
- 27062 - Méricourt
