= SNCF Class BB 9300 =

Class of French electric locomotives

SNCF BB 9300
- BB 9337 at Toulouse
Type and origin
- Power type: Electric
- Builder: (France) Schneider-Jeumont (France) CEM
- Build date: 1967–1969
- Total produced: 40
Specifications
- Configuration
  - UIC: Bo′Bo′
- Gauge: 1,435 mm (4 ft 8 1/2 in) standard gauge
- Length: 16.20 m (53 ft 2 in)
- Width: 2.98 m (9 ft 9 in)
- Height: 4.20 m (13 ft 9 in)
- Electric system/s: 1.5 kV DC Catenary
- Current pickup: Pantograph
- Traction motors: 4x Alsthom GLM 931B
- Loco brake: Rheostatic brakes
Performance figures
- Maximum speed: 160 km/h (99 mph)
- Power output: 3,850 kW (5,160 hp)
- Tractive effort: 260 kN (58,000 lb_{f})
Career
- Operators: SNCF
- Class: BB 9300
- Number in class: 0 (2014)
- Numbers: /
- Locale: South West France - No further north than Tours, no further east than Marseille
- First run: 1967 - 1969
- Disposition: Out Of Service

The SNCF Class BB 9300 was a class of French 1500V DC electric locomotives built by Schneider-Jeumont/CEM between 1967 and 1969. They were later mainly used on passenger services around Marseille, Avignon, Nîmes, Narbonne and Toulouse, and all had been withdrawn by 2014.

== Description ==
The locomotives were 16.2 m (53 ft 2 in) long, weighed 82 t (81 long tons; 90 short tons) and had a tractive effort of 260 kN (58,000 lb_{f}) giving a maximum speed of 160 km/h (99 mph)

Technically, the class was closely derived from BB 9200. They were fitted with one-legged type AM18B pantographs unlike the BB 9200s, which were fitted with diamond type G pantographs. Differences between the two classes were notable at the bogie level, in particular the suspension system. Only the last BB 9200s were equipped with rheostatic braking, while all BB 9300s were equipped with it. The louvres were longer than on the BB 9200. The driver’s cab benefited from new ergonomics and the standardised controls fitted to most locomotives built from 1965.

== Operational use ==
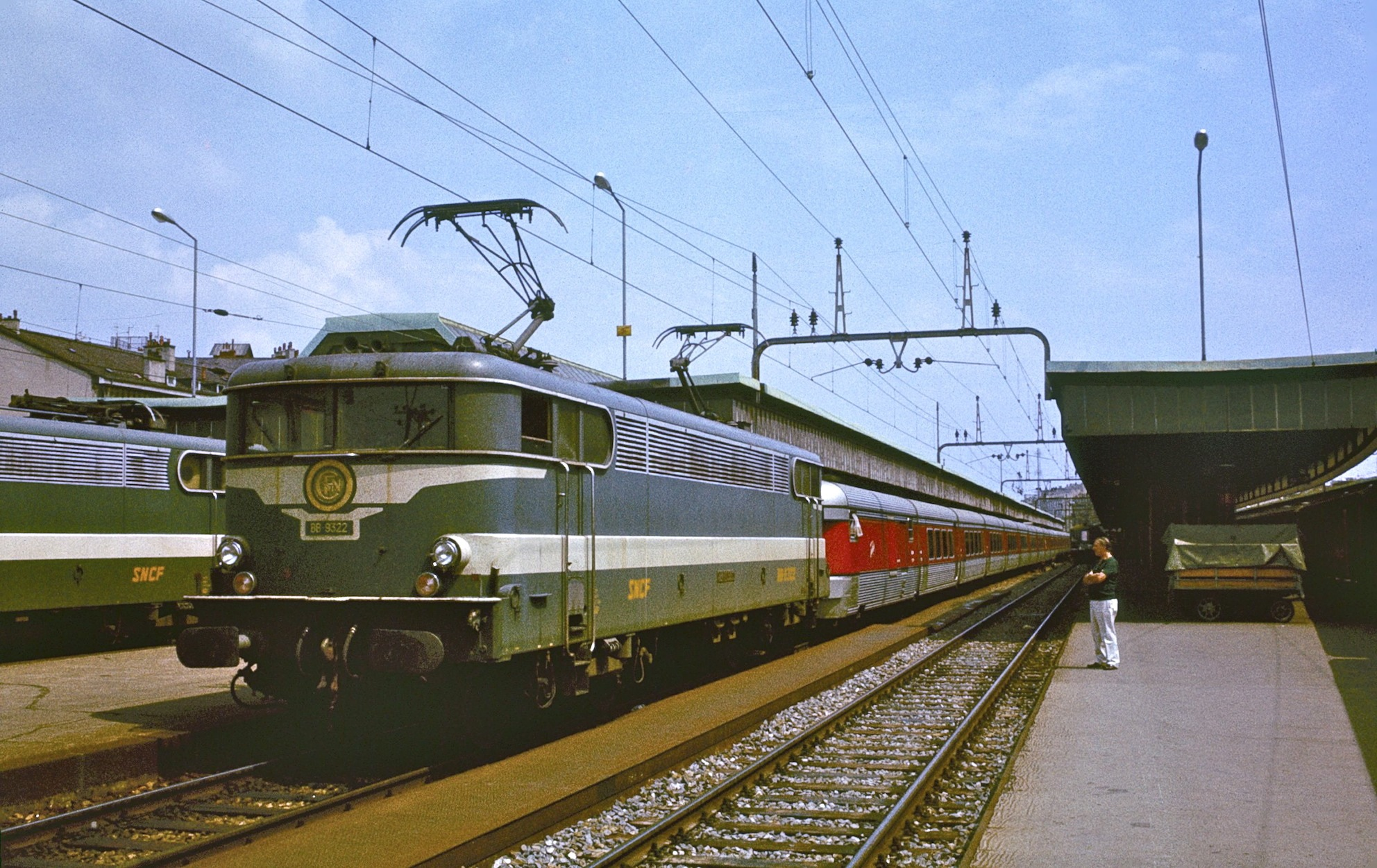
BB 9322 hauling the Catalan Talgo at Genève-Cornavin, 1979

When first delivered, they were assigned to lines in the South-East region, to provide traction for the Rapid and Express trains. From 1967 to 1970, some locomotives were rostered to haul the prestigious TEE Mistral before the advent of the more powerful CC 6500. BB 9319 to 9331 were fitted with special hydrostatic compensated buffers between 1975 and 1981, necessary for hauling the Talgo III-RD trainsets of Renfe on the two services using this stock: TEE Catalan-Talgo Geneva - Barcelona, from Geneva to Narbonne where diesel traction took over, during the period when this train was routed via Lyon-Brotteaux instead of Grenoble; and the Barcelona-Talgo sleeper train, linking Paris and Barcelona, from Paris-Austerlitz to Toulouse, where it was again handed over to diesel traction.

In 1977, the arrival of the new BB 7200s at the Villeneuve depot for service on the Paris-Lyon-Marseille artery displaced the less powerful BB 9300s. They were then progressively transferred to the Toulouse depot. By 1981, the entire class was allocated to Toulouse to operate express and mainline trains between Paris and Toulouse or Bordeaux, and on the cross-country lines of the South-West, as well as a few freight or postal trains.

At the end of the 2000s, the BB 9300s, like their BB 9200 cousins, experienced a sharp drop in activity due to the appearance of new regional multiple units. Some were stored out of use, the others remained in operation on the Teoz connections, then CIC and TER services, still around Toulouse and Bordeaux. They were regularly used to move empty coaching stock between Bordeaux and Juvisy.

== Depot allocations ==
The Villeneuve depot received all 40 locomotives of the class as soon as they were delivered, from 1967 to 1969. From 1977, they were gradually transferred to the Toulouse depot. By 1981 they were all at Toulouse and would remain so until the end of their career.

== Fleet list ==
The last members of the class were withdrawn on 2 September 2014

Number	Commissioned	Withdrawn	Final Livery	Last Depot	Name (Date)
BB 9301	2 December 1967	2 September 2014	Multiservice	STF Midi-Py	
BB 9302	30 January 1968	11 August 1993	Oullins	Toulouse	
BB 9303	25 February 1968	28 March 2013	Traveling	Toulouse	
BB 9304	4 March 1968	10 April 2012	Multiservice	Toulouse	
BB 9305	31 March 1968	6 May 2010	Multiservice	Toulouse	
BB 9306	17 April 1968	30 June 2013	Traveling	Toulouse	
BB 9307	29 April 1968	4 July 2011	Multiservice	Toulouse	
BB 9308	12 May 1968	12 April 2010	Multiservice	Toulouse	
BB 9309	21 June 1968	7 January 2013	Concrete	Toulouse	
BB 9310	19 July 1968	20 January 2011	Concrete	Toulouse	
BB 9311	2 August 1968	18 November 2009	Multiservice	Toulouse	
BB 9312	2 September 1968	1 February 2011	Multiservice	Toulouse	
BB 9313	21 September 1968	30 November 2011	Multiservice	Toulouse	
BB 9314	29 September 1968	26 October 2007	Concrete	Toulouse	
BB 9315	12 October 1968	1 February 2011	Multiservice	Toulouse	
BB 9316	25 October 1968	26 March 2013	Traveling	Toulouse	
BB 9317	9 November 1968	28 March 2013	Multiservice	Toulouse	
BB 9318	23 November 1968	29 March 2013	Traveling	Toulouse	
BB 9319	14 December 1968	2 September 2014	Concrete	STF Midi-Py	
BB 9320	22 December 1968	7 January 2013	Multiservice	Toulouse	
BB 9321	20 January 1969	10 September 2010	Concrete	Toulouse	
BB 9322	25 January 1969	26 June 2013	Traveling	Toulouse	
BB 9323	2 February 1969	29 March 2013	Concrete	Toulouse	
BB 9324	22 February 1969	1 December 2009	Concrete	Toulouse	
BB 9325	3 March 1969	30 November 2012	Multiservice	Toulouse	
BB 9326	10 March 1969	27 November 2012	Traveling	Toulouse	Montrabé (15 October 1988)
BB 9327	21 March 1969	16 January 2012	Concrete	Toulouse	
BB 9328	4 April 1969	12 December 2011	Concrete	Toulouse	
BB 9329	13 April 1969	10 June 2010	Concrete	Toulouse	Castres (23 September 1982)
BB 9330	25 April 1969	29 March 2010	Concrete	Toulouse	
BB 9331	2 May 1969	16 January 2012	Concrete	Toulouse	
BB 9332	12 May 1969	21 February 2008	Concrete	Toulouse	
BB 9333	3 May 1969	4 June 2010	Concrete	Toulouse	
BB 9334	5 June 1969	23 November 2009	Concrete	Toulouse	
BB 9335	20 June 1969	25 January 2010	Multiservice	Toulouse	
BB 9336	28 June 1969	10 September 2006	Concrete	Toulouse	
BB 9337	13 July 1969	31 May 2011	Concrete	Toulouse	
BB 9338	26 July 1969	16 January 2012	Multiservice	Toulouse	
BB 9339	1 October 1969	29 March 2013	Concrete	Toulouse	
BB 9340	21 November 1969	6 July 2010	Concrete	Toulouse	

== Accidents and incidents ==
- BB 9302 was eventually written off following a collision on a level crossing, which occurred on 21 September 1990 at Chéry-Lury
- BB 9305 appeared in the film Ceux qui m'aiment prendront le train. (Those who love me will take the train).

== Preservation ==
- BB 9301: Preserved since September 2014 by the Cité du train, in Mulhouse.
- BB 9337: Preserved since 2011 in the annex of the Cité du train in Mohon.

== Bibliography ==
- Defrance, Jacques (1969). Le matériel moteur de la SNCF. Paris: La Vie du Rail.
- Redouty, Denis (2007). Le matériel moteur de la SNCF. Paris: La Vie du Rail. ISBN 978-2-915034-65-3.
- Constant, Oliver (2004). Encyclopédie du matériel moteur SNCF, "les locomotives à courant continu 1.500 V,. Le Train.
