= Stanislas (train) =

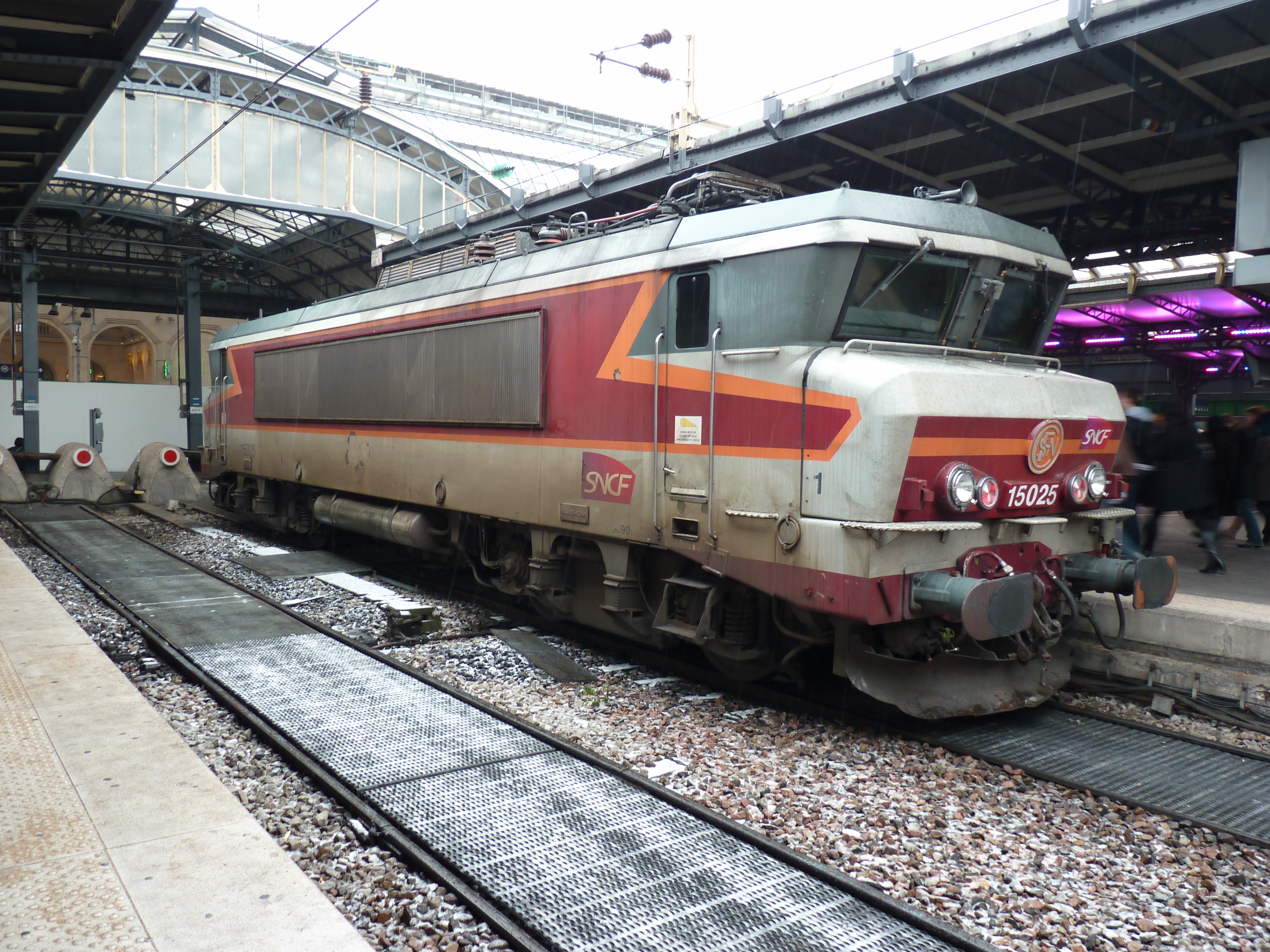
- Stanislas was hauled by a BB 15000 locomotive.

Overview
- Service type: Trans Europ Express (TEE) (1971–1982); Rapide (1982-ca. 1988)
- Status: Discontinued
- Locale: France
- First service: 26 September 1971
- Last service: ca. 1988
- Former operator(s): SNCF

Route
- Termini: Paris-Est; Strasbourg-Ville
- Stops: 1
- Distance travelled: 502 km (312 mi)
- Service frequency: Daily
- Train number(s): TEE 62, 63 (1971–1982); Rapide 60, 63 (1982–ca. 1988)
- Line(s) used: Paris–Strasbourg

On-board services
- Catering facilities: Restaurant car

Technical
- Track gauge: 1,435 mm (4 ft 8 1/2 in)
- Electrification: 25 kV 50 Hz AC

Stanislas was an express train that linked Paris and Strasbourg in France. Introduced in 1971, it was operated by the Société Nationale des Chemins de fer français (SNCF).

The train was named after Stanisław I Leszczyński (French: Stanislas Leszczynski), King of Poland, Duke of Lorraine and a count of the Holy Roman Empire. It was a first-class-only Trans Europ Express (TEE) until 1982, and then a two-class Rapide until its discontinuance in about 1988.

== Route ==
The Stanislas's route was the 502 km (312 mi) long Paris–Strasbourg railway, with just the following stops:

- Paris-Est – Nancy-Ville – Strasbourg-Ville

== History ==
The Stanislas was introduced on 26 September 1971, to complement an existing TEE service, the Kléber, which, since 23 May 1971, had run from Strasbourg to Paris in the morning and had returned to Strasbourg in the evening.

Initially, the Stanislas departed from Paris as TEE 63 at 11:05 (later 11:00) and arrived in Strasbourg at 14:50. The return Stanislas, TEE 62, left Strasbourg at 17:10 and reached Paris at 21:00.

On 26 September 1982, both the morning TEE trains between Paris and Strasbourg were discontinued. The evening TEE 62 service was renamed Kléber, so that the remaining TEE service on the route – one run per day in each direction – would both carry the same name. The Stanislas became a two-class Rapide, eastbound keeping the same schedule as before, departing from Paris at 11:00 (and still train number 63), and westbound taking over what had been the TEE Kleber's schedule, from Strasbourg around 7:45 (still train number 60).

In autumn 1984, the westbound trip's schededule was moved about one hour earlier, from 7:47 to 6:59 (later 6:52), and otherwise the schedule and classification of Stanislas remained unchanged until at least summer 1988, but the train was discontinued by at least 1991—and possibly as early as September 1988.

== Formation (consist) ==
The Stanislas was hauled by the SNCF Class BB 15000, a class of 25 kV 50 Hz AC electric locomotives.

Its inaugural formation of rolling stock was a rake of SNCF Grand Confort coaches painted in a distinctive red, orange, light grey and slate grey livery.

Originally, the coaches were arranged as an A4Dtux, two A8u, two A8tu, two Vru and three ex-Mistral A8u.

On 29 September 1974, the train was lengthened to a total of 12 coaches. The following year, on 26 September 1975, a further coach was added to the formation.

Throughout the Stanislas's existence, its restaurant car was staffed by the Compagnie Internationale des Wagons-Lits (CIWL).

== See also ==
- History of rail transport in France
- List of named passenger trains of Europe
