= Kléber (train) =

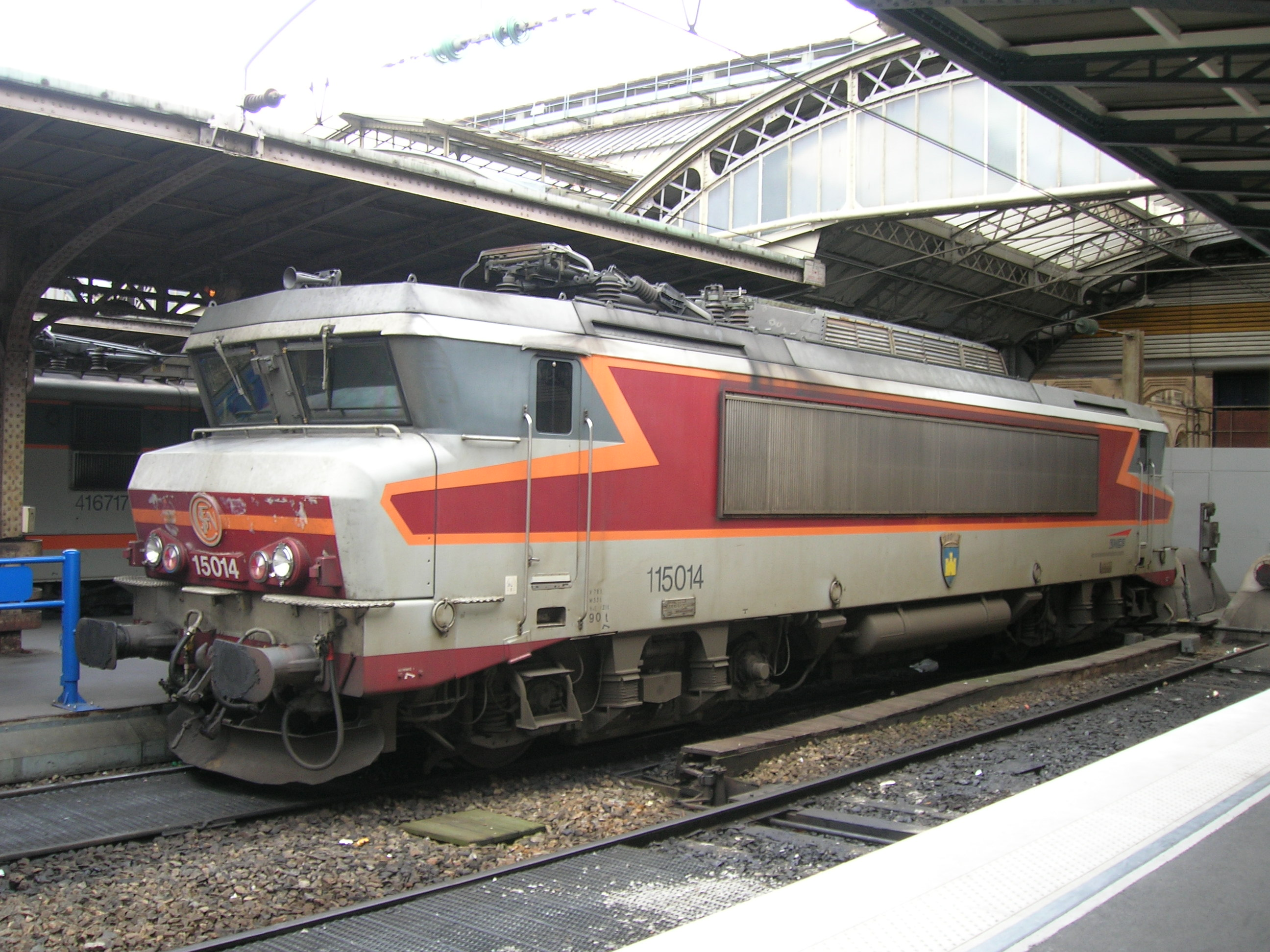
- Kléber was hauled by a BB 15000 locomotive.

Overview
- Service type: Trans Europ Express (TEE)
- Status: Discontinued
- Locale: France
- First service: 23 May 1971
- Last service: 23 September 1988
- Former operator: SNCF

Route
- Termini: Strasbourg-Ville; Paris-Est
- Stops: 1
- Distance travelled: 502 km (312 mi)
- Service frequency: Daily in each direction
- Train numbers: TEE 60, 61 (1971–1982); TEE 61, 62 (1982–1988)

On-board services
- Catering facilities: Restaurant car

Technical
- Track gauge: 1,435 mm (4 ft 8 1/2 in)
- Electrification: 25 kV 50 Hz AC

Kléber was an express train that linked Strasbourg and Paris, France, between 1971 and 1988. It was a first-class-only Trans Europ Express (TEE) operated by the Société Nationale des Chemins de fer français (SNCF).

The train was named after Jean Baptiste Kléber, a Strasbourg-born French general during the French Revolutionary Wars.

== Route ==
The Kléber's route was the 520-kilometre-long (320 mi) Paris–Strasbourg railway, with just the following stops:

- Strasbourg-Ville – Nancy-Ville – Paris-Est

== History ==
The Kléber was introduced on 23 May 1971. Initially, it departed from Strasbourg as TEE 60 at 07:50 and arrived in Paris at 11:40. The return train, TEE 61, left Paris at 17:20 and reached Strasbourg at 21:10.

Between the Winter 1973/74 timetable and its 1980/81 counterpart, the train ran 15 minutes later in each direction.

On 26 September 1982, the morning TEE 60 service was discontinued. Its name was transferred to the evening TEE 62 Strasbourg–Paris service, which had previously been the TEE Stanislas. The latter became the Rapide Stanislas, keeping its same late morning departure time from Paris and taking over Kléber's morning schedule from Strasbourg.

The TEE 62, now renamed Kléber (ex-TEE Stanislas), continued to leave Strasbourg at 17:10 and arrive in Paris at 21:00.

The TEE 62 / TEE 61 ceased to exist as separate trains on 23 September 1988, when they were integrated into an international train between Paris and Stuttgart Hbf in Stuttgart, Germany.

== Formation (consist) ==
The Kléber was hauled by the SNCF Class BB 15000, a class of 25 kV 50 Hz AC electric locomotives.

Its inaugural formation of rolling stock was a rake of SNCF Grand Confort coaches painted in a distinctive red, orange, light grey and slate grey livery.

Originally, the coaches were arranged as an A4Dtux, two A6u, three A8tu, an Vru and an A3rtu. On 28 September 1975, the train was lengthened to a total of 13 coaches.

Due to the limited availability of the Grand Confort coaches, they were occasionally replaced by Mistral 56-type DEV Inox coaches. In 1982, the train's formation was changed to Mistral 69-type DEV Inoxes.

Throughout the Kléber's existence, its restaurant car was staffed by the Compagnie Internationale des Wagons-Lits (CIWL).

== See also ==
- History of rail transport in France
- List of named passenger trains of Europe
