= Étendard (train) =

French express train

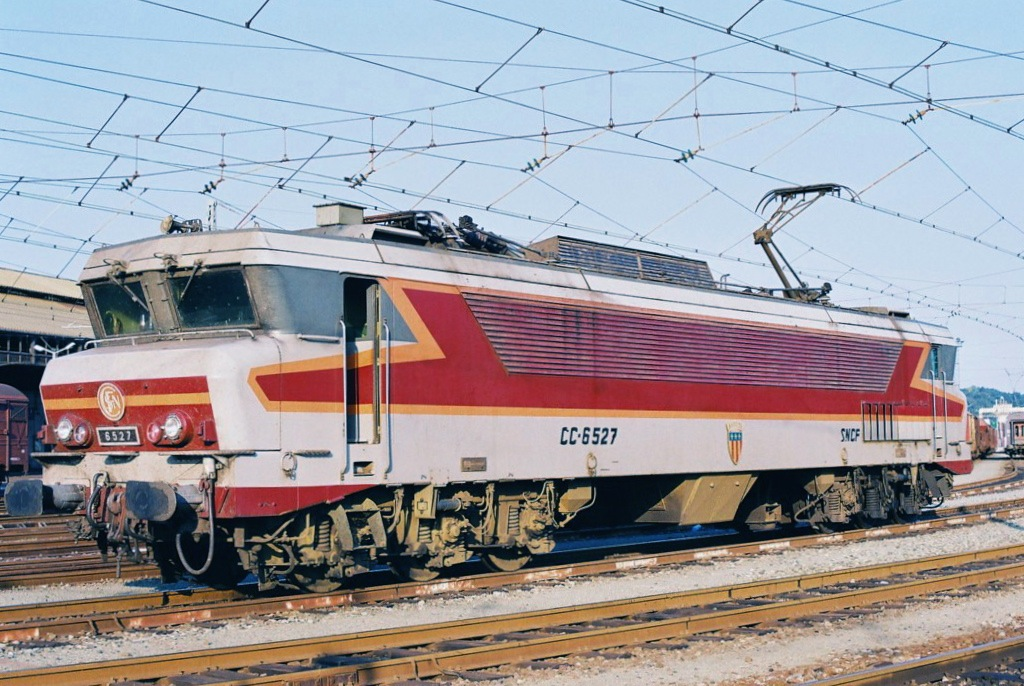
- The Étendard was hauled by a CC 6500 locomotive.

Overview
- Service type: Rapide (1968–1971); Trans Europ Express (TEE) (1971–1984); Rapide (1984–1990)
- Status: Discontinued
- Locale: France
- First service: 29 September 1968
- Last service: 1990
- Former operator: SNCF

Route
- Termini: Paris-Austerlitz; Bordeaux-Saint-Jean
- Distance travelled: 579.3 km (360.0 mi) (Paris–Bordeaux)
- Train number: TEE 5, 4 (1971–1984)
- Line used: Paris–Bordeaux

On-board services
- Classes: First-class-only (1971–1984); First and second class (1968–1971; 1984–1990)

Technical
- Rolling stock: SNCF Class CC 6500; Grand Confort
- Track gauge: 1,435 mm (4 ft 8 1/2 in)
- Electrification: 1.5 kV DC

The Étendard was an express train that linked Paris and Bordeaux in France. Introduced in 1968, it was operated by the Société Nationale des Chemins de fer français (SNCF), and was initially a Rapide.

The train's name, L'Étendard (literally, "The Standard") is the French word for "banner", and commonly refers to military banners, as carried on parades and into battle.

From 1971 to 1984, the Étendard was a first-class-only Trans Europ Express (TEE), and between 1973 and 1975, the southbound service was an international train linking Paris with Spain. It reverted to being a two-class Rapide in June 1984 and was discontinued entirely with the introduction of TGV service between Paris and Bordeaux, in 1990.

== Route ==
=== Core route ===
The Étendard's core route was the 584 km (363 mi) long Paris–Bordeaux railway. The train normally ran daily except Sundays southbound and daily except Saturdays northbound.

=== Variation ===
Starting in 1973, the Étendard's southbound route was extended along the Bordeaux–Irun railway line to terminate in Irun, Spain, and its northbound route was extended to start in Hendaye, France, stations located on opposite sides of the French–Spanish border. During the summer timetable periods, these extensions were served on all operating days (six days a week), except certain holidays. During other seasons, the portion between Bordeaux and Irun or Hendaye usually operated only one day a week: southbound on Saturdays, northbound on Sundays. These extensions lasted until 1975.

== Formation (consist) ==
The Étendard was usually hauled by one of SNCF's 1.5 kV DC, Class CC 6500 electric locomotives. A headboard bearing the name of the train was attached to the front of the locomotive, a practice also applied to those locomotives when they were hauling the Aquitaine and Le Capitole.

When the Étendard became a TEE in 1971, its formation of rolling stock was a rake of SNCF Grand Confort coaches, being an A4Dtux, three A8tu, six A8u, one A3rtu and one Vru. The coaches were painted in a distinctive red, orange, light grey and slate grey livery.

On 3 June 1973, to enable the train to run at speeds of up to 200 km/h (120 mph), the formation was shortened to ten coaches, namely one A4Dtux, two A8tu, five A8u, one A3rtu, and one Vru.

Throughout the Étendard's existence, its dining car was staffed by the Compagnie Internationale des Wagons-Lits (CIWL).

== See also ==
- History of rail transport in France
- List of named passenger trains of Europe
- TGV Atlantique
