= Aquitaine (train) =

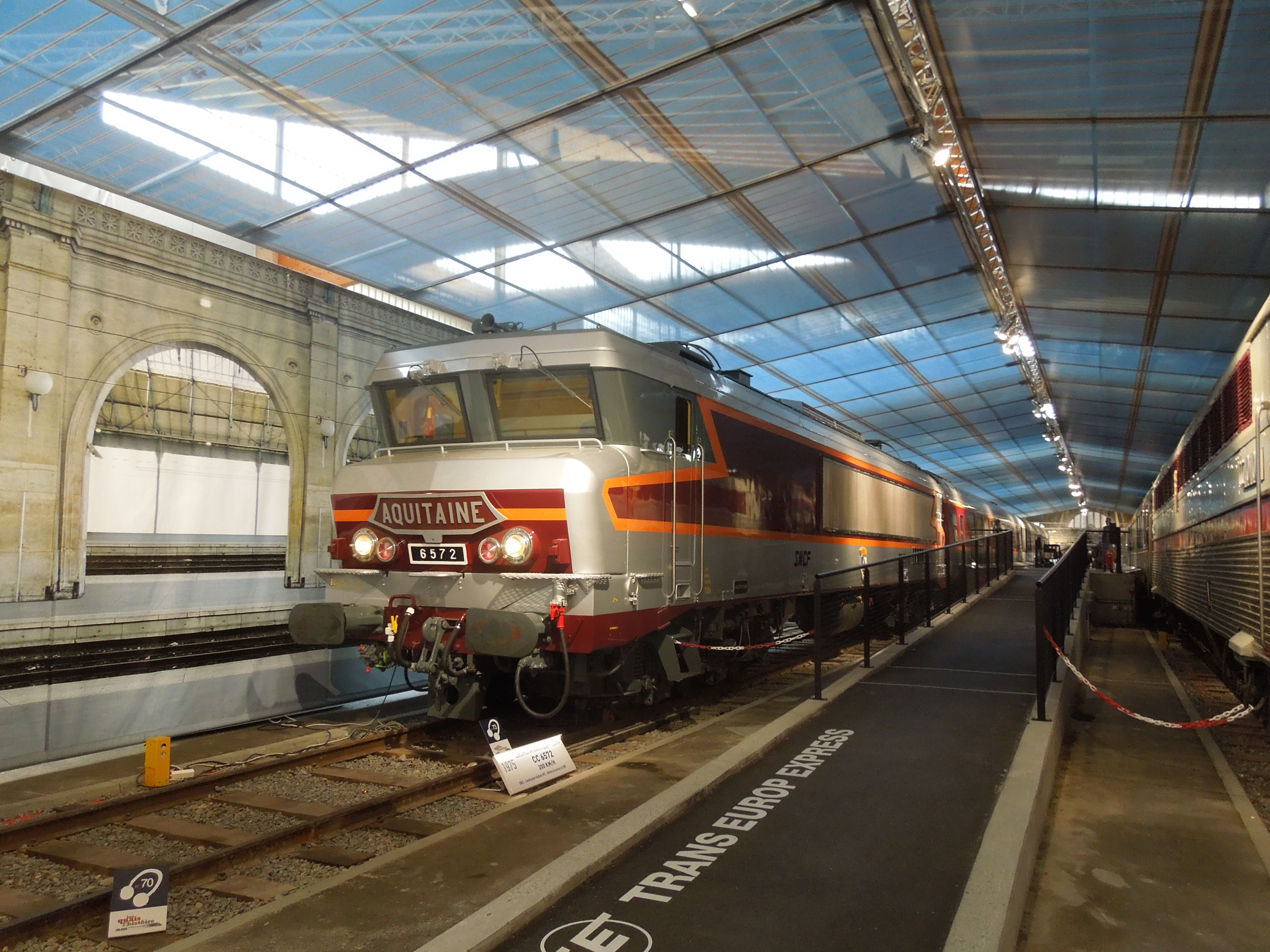
- Preserved Class CC 6500 locomotive at the Cité du Train museum, with "Aquitaine" headboard

Overview
- Service type: Trans Europ Express (TEE) (1971–1984); Rapide (1984–c.1990)
- Status: Discontinued
- Locale: France
- First service: 23 May 1971
- Last service: ca. 1990
- Former operator: SNCF

Route
- Termini: Bordeaux-Saint-Jean; Paris-Austerlitz
- Stops: See text
- Distance travelled: 579.3 km (360.0 mi)
- Average journey time: See text
- Service frequency: Sun–Fri (1971–1983); See text (1983/84–ca. 1990)
- Train number: TEE 2, 1 (1971–1984)
- Line used: Paris–Bordeaux

On-board services
- Classes: First-class-only (1971–1984); First and second class (1984–1990)
- Catering facilities: Dining car Buffet car

Technical
- Rolling stock: SNCF Class CC 6500; Grand Confort
- Track gauge: 1,435 mm (4 ft 8 1/2 in)
- Electrification: 1.5 kV DC

The Aquitaine was an express train that linked Bordeaux and Paris, France, between 1971 and about 1990. Operated by the Société Nationale des Chemins de fer français (SNCF), it was a first-class-only Trans Europ Express (TEE) until 1984 and then a two-class Rapide until discontinued, circa 1990.

The train was named after the region of Aquitaine, of which Bordeaux is the capital.

== Route ==
=== Core route ===
The Aquitaine's core route was the 584 km (363 mi) long Paris–Bordeaux railway. Initially, the train ran non-stop, but by the time it was discontinued, it had the following stops:

- Bordeaux-Saint-Jean – Angoulême – Poitiers – Saint-Pierre-des-Corps – Paris-Austerlitz

=== Variation ===
Starting in late 1984, the Aquitaine's northbound route was extended to start in Hendaye on Mondays only (except holidays). On other operating days, Tuesdays through Fridays, the train still started in Bordeaux. Southbound trips continued to terminate in Bordeaux on Mondays through Thursdays, but on Fridays (except holidays) were extended to Pau, and in autumn 1986 extended farther, to Tarbes (still on Fridays only).

== History ==
The train was introduced on 23 May 1971, as a counterpart to another named train, the Étendard, a Rapide that had been running on the same route, in the opposite direction (i.e. Paris–Bordeaux–Paris), since 1968.

In its first two years of operation, the Aquitaine departed from Bordeaux-Saint-Jean as TEE 2 at 07:15 and reached Paris-Austerlitz at 11:25; the return Aquitaine, TEE 1, left Paris at 17:55 and arrived in Bordeaux at 21:55.

The Aquitaine was aimed at business travellers, and therefore did not run on Saturdays, nor during the high season.

At the start of the winter 1971/72 timetable, the Étendard was upgraded to TEE status, as TEE 5/4. This meant that on weekdays two TEE trains, the Aquitaine and the Étendard, served the same route in each direction.

From the summer 1973 timetable onwards, the morning Aquitaine departed 45 minutes later.

In the summer of 1981, both the morning and evening Aquitaine services began stopping in Angoulême. In the winter of 1981/82, another stop, in Poitiers, was added to both services, and the morning train also began stopping in Saint-Pierre-des-Corps. In the summer of 1982, the Saint-Pierre-des-Corps stop was added to the timetable of the evening train.

These additional stops did not overcome waning demand for the Aquitaine. For the winter 1983/84 timetable, the morning train was rescheduled to depart Bordeaux half an hour later, and the days of operation of both services were cut back: the morning train became a Tuesday to Friday service, and the evening train was reduced to Mondays to Thursdays.

At the next timetable change, the Aquitaine was downgraded to a two-class InterCity/Rapide train, and not operating between late June and early September. Increased competition from air travel had made the operation of a first-class train with both a dining car and a buffet car no longer feasible. The train last ran as a TEE on 30 May 1984.

Aquitaine was still operating as a Rapide in 1988, Mondays to Fridays only, but was discontinued entirely with the introduction of through TGV service between Paris and Bordeaux, around 1990.

== Formation (consist) ==
The Aquitaine was usually hauled by one of SNCF's 1.5 kV DC, Class CC 6500 electric locomotives. A headboard bearing the name of the train was attached to the front of the locomotive, a practice also applied to those locomotives when they were hauling Le Capitole and Étendard.

The train's formation of rolling stock was a rake of SNCF Grand Confort coaches, being an A4Dtux, two A8tu, four A8u, one A3rtu, and one Vr. The coaches were painted in a distinctive red, orange, light grey and slate grey livery.

When necessary, the formation was augmented by two further coaches.

Throughout the Aquitaine's existence, its dining car was staffed by the Compagnie Internationale des Wagons-Lits (CIWL).

== See also ==
- History of rail transport in France
- List of named passenger trains of Europe
- TGV Atlantique
