= SNCF Class BB 16000 =

Class of French electric locomotives

BB 16000
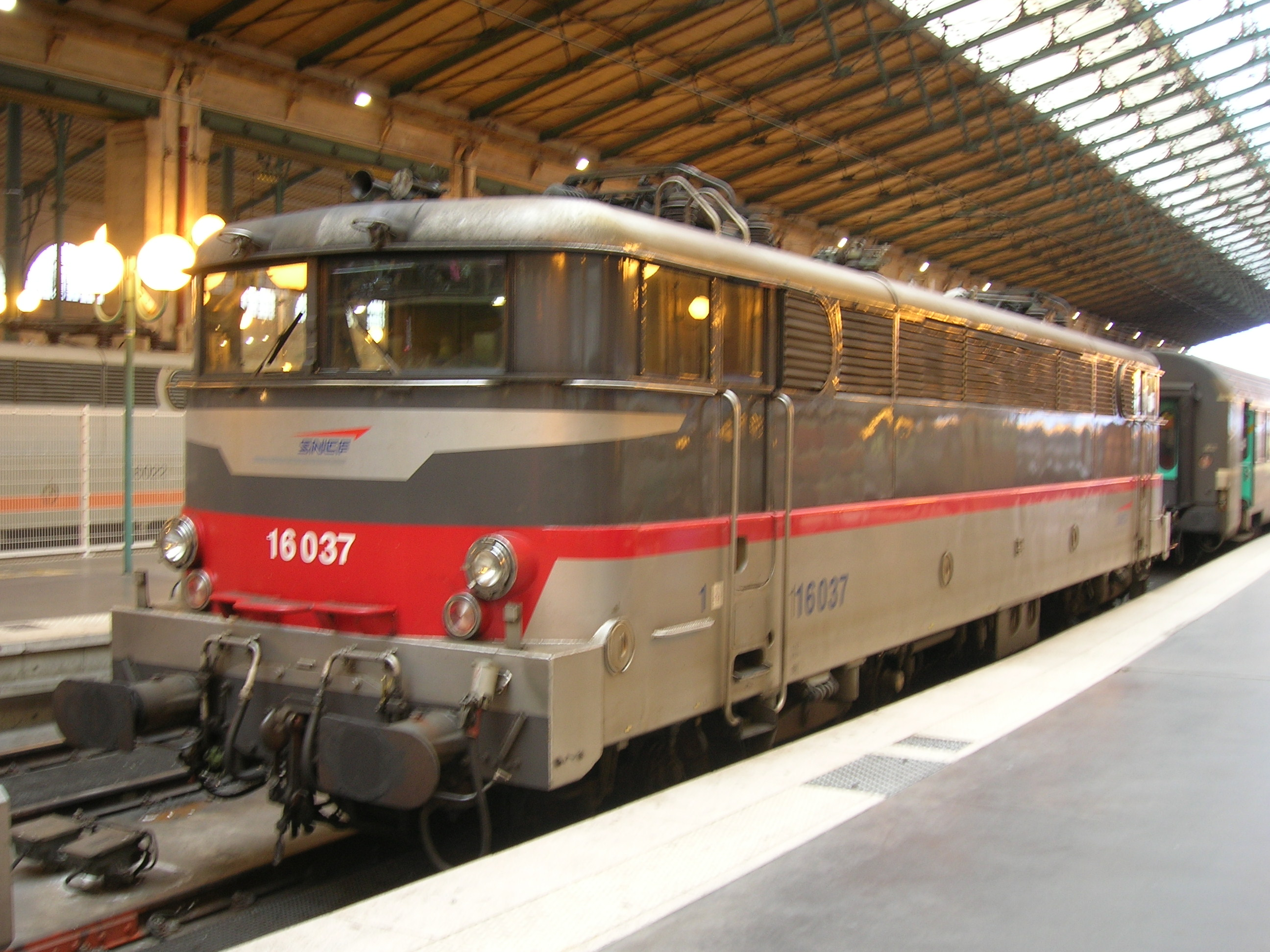
- BB 16037 at Paris Gare du Nord, 26 December 2005.
Type and origin
- Power type: Electric
- Builder: Le Matériel de Traction Électrique (MTE)
- Build date: 1958–1963
- Total produced: 62
Specifications
- Configuration
  - UIC: Bo′Bo′
- Gauge: 1,435 mm (4 ft 8 1/2 in) standard gauge
- Length: 16.68 m (54 ft 9 in)
- Loco weight: 88 tonnes (87 long tons; 97 short tons)
- Electric system/s: 25 kV 50 Hz AC Catenary
- Current pickup: Pantograph
- Traction motors: Jeumont TO 136-8, 4 off
Performance figures
- Maximum speed: 160 km/h (100 mph)
- Power output: 4,130 kW (5,540 hp)
- Tractive effort: 309 kN (69,000 lbf)
Career
- Operators: SNCF
- Numbers: BB 16001 – BB 16062

The SNCF BB 16000 are a class of 25 kV 50 Hz AC electric locomotives produced by MTE. They are the AC version of the BB 9200.

== Description ==
This class of 62 locomotives was ordered in 1958 in order to equip the north east network with high speed locomotives capable of running at 160 km/h (99 mph) under 25 kV-50 Hz single-phase catenary. They are part of the large family of locomotives nicknamed BB Jacquemin, of which the BB 9200 were the first versions produced for 1.5 kV direct current operation, and developed using the results of speed tests carried out on the prototype series BB 9001-9002 and BB 9003–9004.

During the development of the BB 16000, test runs at 240 km/h (150 mph) were carried out to check the behavior of the AM 11 single-arm pantographs.

== Design ==
The electrical power equipment is directly derived from the first machines using Jacquemin concepts, the BB 12000: 25kV / 15kV auto-transformer, auxiliary transformer and traction transformer, rectifiers with ignitrons, later replaced by silicon diodes, and smoothing chokes, shunt resistors on the inductors of the 4 traction motors, and Arno three-phase converter to supply hotel power. The interesting improvement concerns the replacement of the mechanical camshaft controllers, as used on the BB 12000s, by Jeumont-Heidmann servomotors. The first 34 BB 16000s had provisional support for the AM 11 single-arm pantograph, similar to that fitted to BB 9400, except that the insulators are different for a single-phase machine. From BB 16035, the new reinforced support was installed, as used by BB 16500.

BB 16001 to 51 were delivered with a body similar to the first 21 BB 9200 locomotives, with short louvres. From BB 16052 the louvres were lengthened. There were some minor differences between the two sub-series, concerning the weight and the electrical equipment.

BB 16012 had additional ventilation louvres, which were provisionally installed to test the new silicon diode rectifier blocks. These were retained after the tests were concluded.

BB 16050 was the only push-pull fitted member of the class allocated to Corail never to have sported the Corail livery. It was fitted with the control cables and equipment while it was still in the mid-1970s green livery which it retained.

15 members of the class have been converted to class BB 16100 to operate VB2N sets in push-pull mode.

== Service history ==
The BB 16000s during their very long career have hauled most of the fast and express trains of the north, east, and north-west networks. With the progress of the 25 kV electrification, they quickly supplanted steam locomotives on services, from prestigious TEEs to interregional trains, and to certain fast freight trains.

Their versatility, their robustness, and their performance, have allowed certain members of the class to exceed 53 years of service and more than 10 million kilometres (6.2 million miles) traveled, which remains exceptional. The arrival of more modern and more powerful machines, of the BB 15000, BB 22200, BB 26000 classes did not lead, to their downgrading, because they still met the needs very well.

With the entry into service of the LGV Est in 2007, the transport offer has refocused around TGVs, freeing up many locomotives and imposing a reorganization of operating diagrams. A large number of BB 15000s were transferred from Strasbourg to Achères to operate Corail and TER services from Paris-Nord and Paris-Saint-Lazare. Some were modified for push-pull operation, quickly leading to the withdrawal of the BB 16100 classes used before and greatly reducing the use of the BB 16000s.

BB 16061 provided the last service of class to Paris-Saint-Lazare on 03/13/2010 with the haulage of a Paris - Le Havre train. The class, still managed by the Achères MPD, was assigned to Paris-La Chapelle for the operation of the Corail-Intercités (CIC), on diagrams common to the BB 15000s and the BB 22200s.

Withdrawals of the class occurred between 2009 and 2012, some units being parked on the Sotteville-lès-Rouen branch, an antechamber for upcoming demolition.

A celebration was organized by an association of retired drivers from the Aulnoye depot, on 24 November 2012, on the occasion of the 1637 Paris to Maubeuge train, hauled by BB 16029 decked out for the occasion. This involved a photoshoot at Paris-Nord and live entertainment at Aulnoye-Aymeries station.

The last two locomotives kept in active service, BB 16029 and BB 16051, were regularly in use until 16 December 2012, hauling CIC services between Paris and Amiens and Paris and Maubeuge. The last six members of the class were withdrawn from service on 31 December 2012.

=== Route allocation ===
Principle routes served were:
From Paris Saint Lazare:

- Rouen - Le Havre (last trip on March 13, 2010)
- Lisieux - Trouville-Deauville
- Caen - Cherbourg

From Paris Nord:

- Longueau - Amiens
- Lille - Tourcoing
- Arras - Dunkirk
- Aulnoye - Jeumont
- Tergnier - Saint-Quentin - Cambrai
- Compiègne - Saint-Quentin - Maubeuge (last trip on December 20, 2012)

From Paris Est:

- Nancy - Strasbourg
- Reims - Charleville-Mézières

Regional services:

- Lille - Amiens - Rouen (last trip 12 December 2004 - replacement by TER 2N)
- Strasbourg - Colmar - Mulhouse - Basel (international service)
- Metz - Thionville
- Thionville - Neufchâteau

Freight services:

- Noisy-Le-Sec - Lille-Champ de Mars
- Le Bourget - Aulnoye

=== Depot allocations ===
- Initial allocation to La Chapelle from 1958, then transferred to Achères in October 1995)
- Lens (in 1958, then transfer to La Chapelle)
- Achères (from 1995)
- Strasbourg (from 1958 to 1962, then transfer to La Villette on June 1, 1962; return to Strasbourg on July 17, 1962, then transfer to La Chapelle from July 1973)

== Modifications and liveries ==
The BB 16000 have successively worn various liveries and underwent the following modifications:

- Original livery: light bluish green reinforced with a border at the bottom of the body and the louvres area in dark bluish green, as well as accessories in polished aluminum: "moustaches" in the shape of a wing under the bays and lamp surrounds connected from front to back by a line of grey paint; the coupling area is red;
- In the 1960s, the reinforcement of the cabins led to the elimination of the corner windows;
- Reinforced end cross members were installed at the expense of the coupling fairings and corner skirts were removed;
- From the 1970s, the handles of the cabin access doors were moved on all BB Jacquemin models: initially in the high position near the window, they were relocated to the bottom of the door in a recess which was previously used to pull the door close;
- End of the 1970s: installation of unified headlights and red lights;
- Corail Livery, created in 1977 by Jacques Beffara, consisting of a dark grey with roof and body part between headlights and lamp housings in light grey and a coral orange dividing strip emerging under the headlight surrounds, most of them had kept their aluminum surrounds;
- Concrete livery, introduced in 1985, without the aluminium detailing, grey with a moustache under the front windows and a band surrounding the body painted in chamois, then in TGV orange TGV;
- The conversion to BB 16100 from 1991 is associated with a light grey livery with 3 areas in dark grey: the sill, the bay strip front and louvres and heavy low whiskers encompassing the front lights and overflowing onto the sides, finally an orange belt band between the side sills and whiskers. This livery was designed by Roger Tallon.
- Multiservice livery in 1995, dark grey, replaced in 2001 by storm grey, with roof, whiskers under bay windows and part metallic grey lower body, with a red line at mid-flank forming on the front faces a trapezoidal apron descending to the cross members, including the windows; it is this apron which bears the vehicle number, the moustache displaying the SNCF logo;
- Delivered with blue vinyl coating "En Voyage", from 2002.
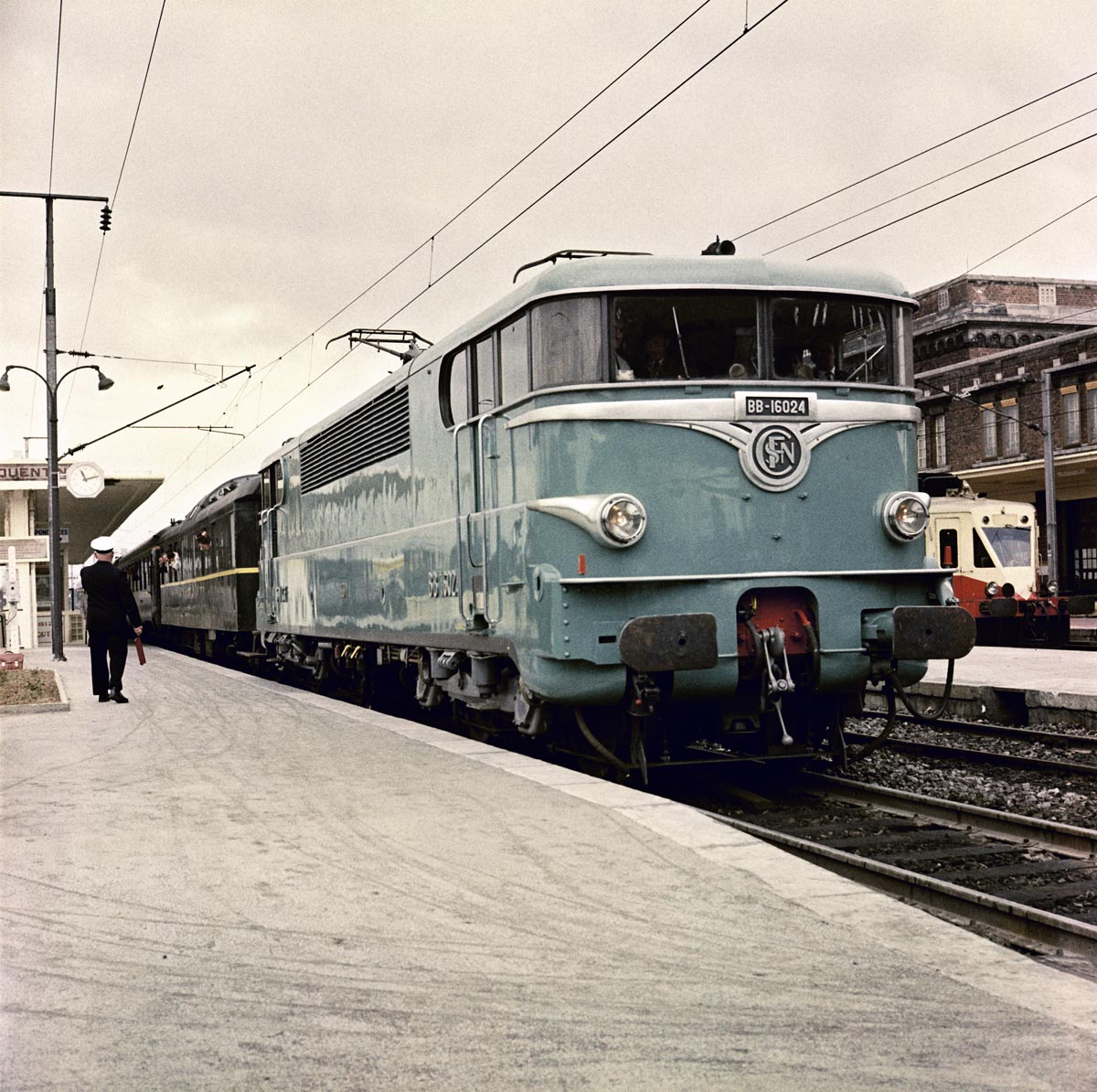
Original livery with aluminum ornaments.

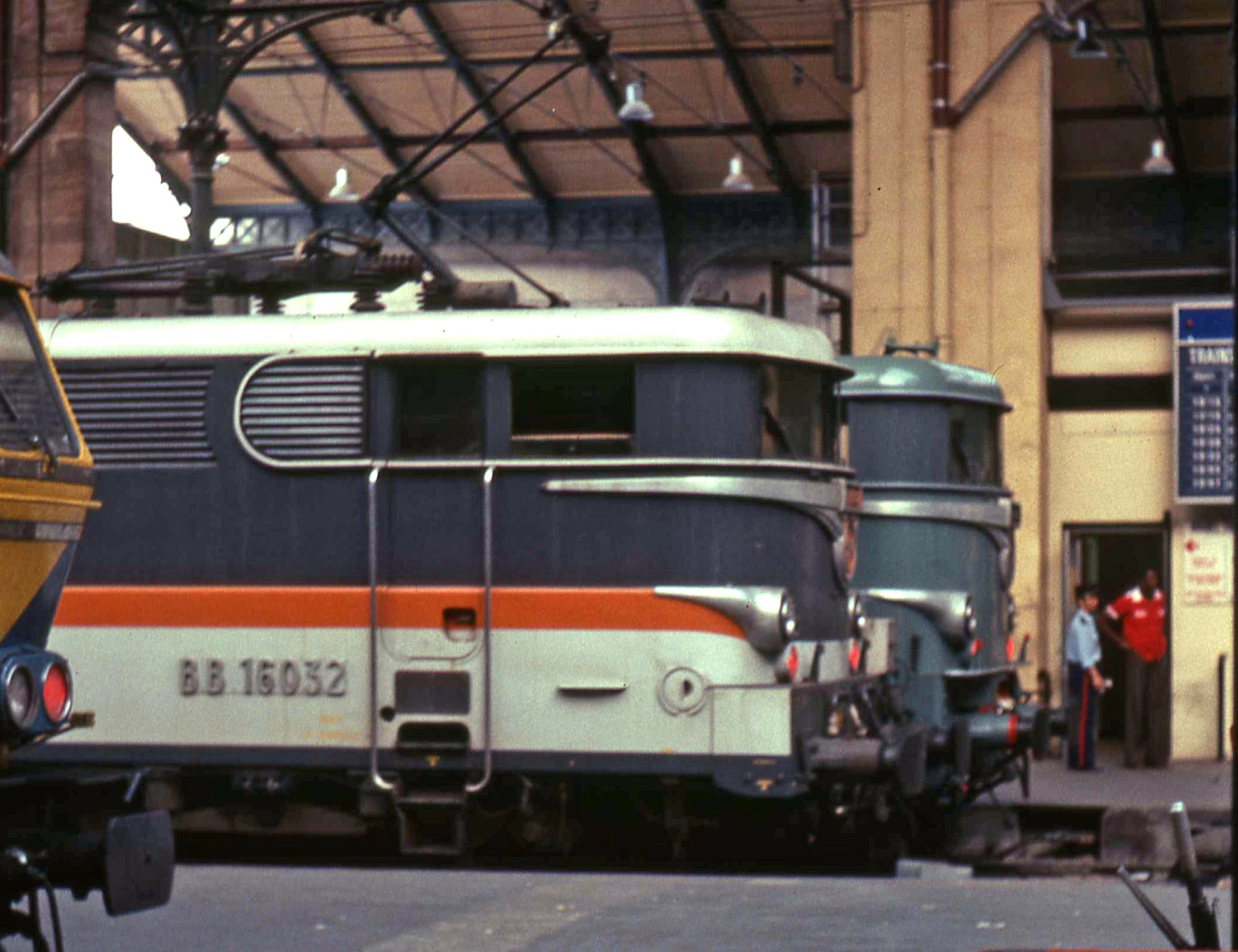
Corail livery

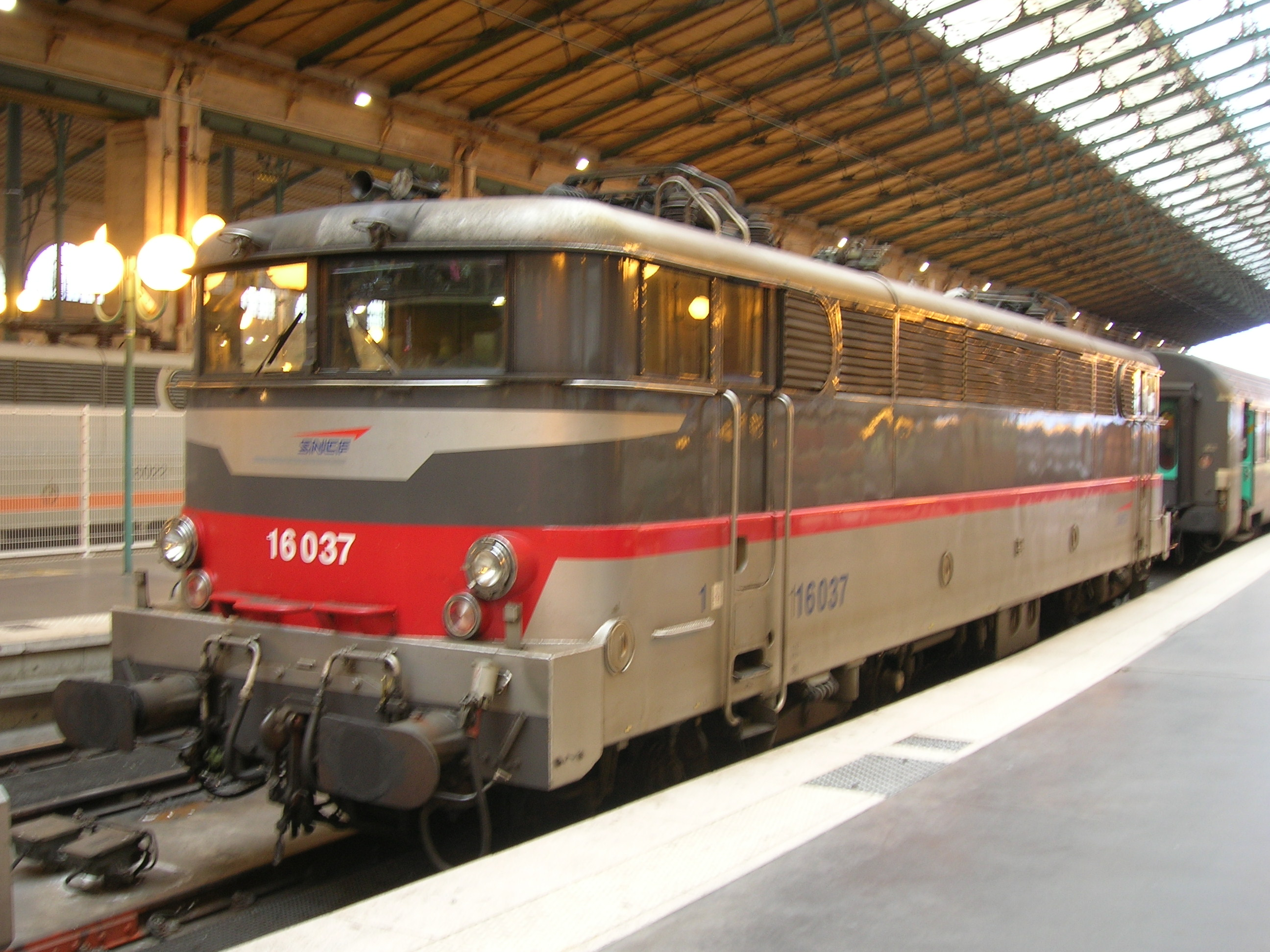
Multiservice livery

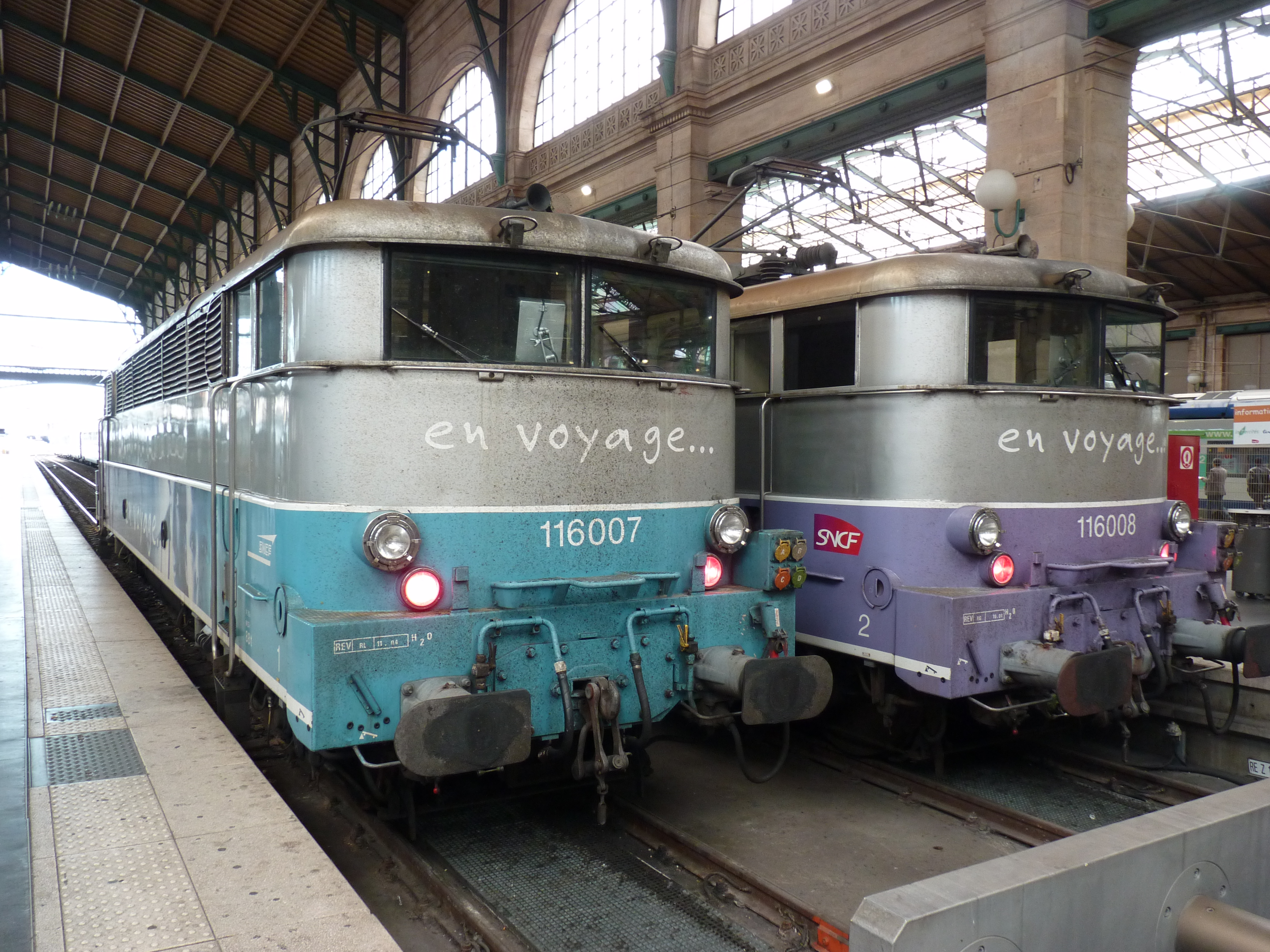
Two “en voyage” liveries, one blue, the other purple.

== Fleet list ==
Number	In service	Withdrawn	Final livery	Delivered	Name (date)
16001	1 February 1958	13 December 2004, (Note: Withdrawn following a derailment in Busigny, on June 8, 2004;)	Multiservices	Achères	Neuilly-sur-Marne (15 October 1983)
16002	27 December 1958	18 May 2009	Multiservices	Achères	
16003	3 May 1958	13 December 2011	En Voyage	Achères	
16004	31 May 1958	Rebuilt as 16101	/	/	
16005	21 June 1958	21 July 2011	Multiservices	Achères	
16006	3 July 1958	13 April 2012	En Voyage	Achères	
16007	3 August 1958	13 April 2012	En Voyage	Achères	Mantes-la-Jolie (11 October 1980)
16008	4 August 1958	31 December 2012	En Voyage	Achères	Drancy (19 May 1979)
16009	27 August 1958	Rebuilt as 16106	/	/	
16010	6 September 1958	Rebuilt as 16112	/	/	
16011	24 September 1958	4 June 2009	Multiservices	Achères	
16012	9 October 1958	30 August 2012	En Voyage	Achères	
16013	17 October 1958	1 August 2007	Concrete	Achères	
16014	31 October 1958	Rebuilt as 16105	/	/	
16015	16 November 1958	3 September 2009	Multiservices	Achères	
16016	21 November 1958	Rebuilt as 16111	/	/	
16017	2 December 1958	Rebuilt as 16102	/	/	
16018	12 December 1958	18 May 2009	Concrete	Achères	
16019	22 December 1958	23 March 2010	Multiservices	Achères	
16020	31 December 1958	24 September 2010	Multiservices	Achères	
16021	16 January 1959	15 November 2010	Multiservices	Achères	
16022	30 January 1959	25 October 2007	Concrete	Achères	
16023	25 February 1959	Rebuilt as	/	/	
16024	2 May 1959	22 December 2006	Concrete	Achères	
16025	13 April 1959	9 December 1976	Green	La Chapelle	
16026	2 May 1959	Rebuilt as	/	/	
16027	27 June 1959	9 February 2009	Multiservices	Achères	
16028	1 August 1959	1 December 2009	Concrete	Achères	
16029	3 July 1959	31 December 2012	En Voyage	Achères	
16030	3 August 1959	Rebuilt as 16113	/	/	
16031	8 August 1959	1 June 2008	Multiservices	Achères	
16032	17 September 1959	20 February 2012	En Voyage	Achères	
16033	3 October 1959	1 December 2008	Multiservices	Achères	
16034	14 October 1959	1 November 1996	Concrete	Achères	
16035	5 November 1959	Rebuilt as 16110	/	/	
16036	13 November 1959	1 June 2006	Multiservices	Achères	
16037	30 November 1959	1 June 2008	Multiservices	Achères	
16038	31 December 1959	6 December 1978	Green	La Chapelle	
16039	12 January 1960	31 December 2012	En Voyage	Achères	
16040	21 January 1960	Rebuilt as 16104	/	/	
16041	16 February 1960	13 April 2012	Multiservices	Achères	
16042	17 March 1960	18 May 2009	Multiservices	Achères	
16043	22 June 1960	31 December 2012	Multiservices	Achères	
16044	2 May 1960	1 December 2008	Concrete	Achères	
16045	6 June 1960	2 January 1991	Green	La Chapelle	
16046	4 July 1960	Rebuilt as 16103	/	/	
16047	16 September 1960	9 February 2009	Concrete	Achères	
16048	4 October 1960	Rebuilt as 16107	/	/	
16049	2 November 1960	22 December 2006	Concrete	Achères	
16050	16 December 1960	9 November 2009	Multiservices	Achères	
16051	13 March 1961	31 December 2012	Multiservices	Achères	
16052	8 June 1962	4 June 2009	Multiservices	Achères	
16053	6 July 1962	31 December 2012	En Voyage	Achères	
16054	3 August 1962	December 21, 2011	Multiservices	Achères	
16055	26 September 1962	11 May 2009	Concrete	Achères	
16056	31 October 1962	27 May 2011	Multiservices	Achères	
16057	30 November 1962	21 May 2008	Multiservices	Achères	
16058	21 December 1962	12 December 2011	Multiservices	Achères	
16059	31 January 1963	23 March 2010	Multiservices	Achères	
16060	28 February 1963	Rebuilt as 16115	/	/	
16061	26 April 1963	1 June 2011	Multiservices	Achères	
16062	28 June 1963	Rebuilt as 16114	/	/	Dol-de-Bretagne (4 September 1976)

== Preservation ==
- BB 16020 preserved by SNCF at Mohon.
- BB 16113 (ex 16030): preserved by SNCF at Mohon.

== In popular culture ==
- BB 16011 appears in the film Les Rois mages
- An unidentified member of the class appears in the film L'Auvergnat et l'Autobus
- BB 16020 was used in 1959 during the first live television broadcast from a train on the occasion of the inauguration of electric traction between Paris Nord and Lille.
- BB 16665 appears at the beginning of the film Deux Hommes dans la ville, directed by José Giovanni in 1973.

== Models ==
This locomotive was reproduced by the firms HOrnby-acHO, Jouef, Roco and REE-modèles.
