= SNCF Class CC 6500 =

Class of 78 French 1500 V DC C′C′ locomotives

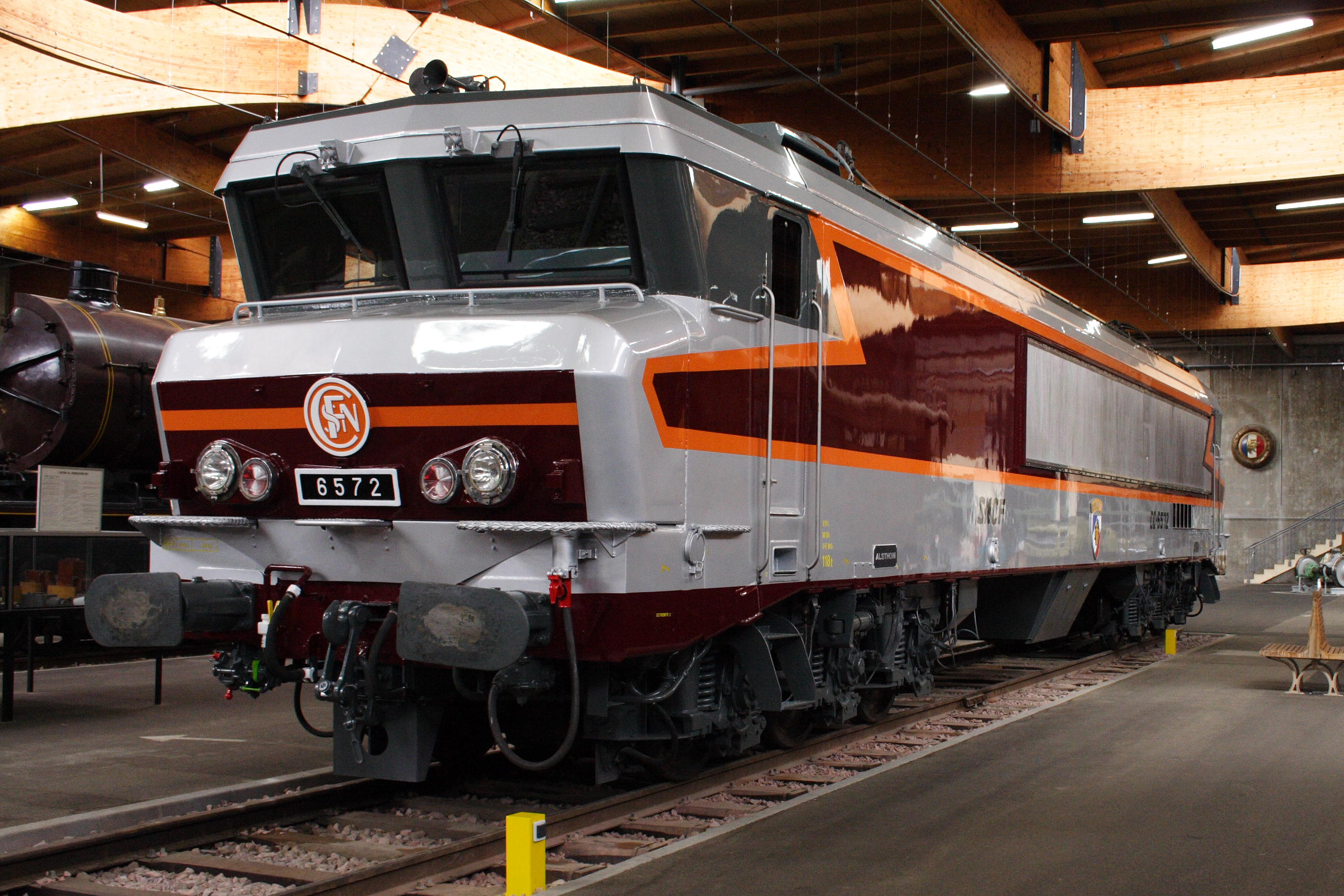
- CC-6572 Résistance-Fer at Cité du Train de Mulhouse, Mulhouse, France
Type and origin
- Power type: Electric
- Builder: Alsthom and MTE
- Order number: CC6501 to 6578
- Build date: 1969-1975
- Total produced: 75+3 (transformation of the three CC21000)
- Rebuilder: Alsthom (for Amtrak)
- Number rebuilt: 1
Specifications
- Configuration
  - UIC: C′C′
- Gauge: 1,435 mm (4 ft 8 1/2 in) standard gauge
- Wheel diameter: 1,140 mm (44.88 in)
- Length: 20.19 m (66 ft 3 in)
- Height: 4.30 m (14 ft 1 in)
- Frame type: Steel and glassfiber
- Loco weight: CC 6501 to 38 : 115 tonnes (113 long tons; 127 short tons); CC 6539 to 74 : 118 tonnes (116 long tons; 130 short tons); X996 : 132.5 tonnes (130.4 long tons; 146.1 short tons)
- Electric system/s: 1.5 kV DC Catenary; 25 kV 50 Hz AC Catenary (in addition, CC 21000 only); 11 kV 25 Hz AC Catenary (Amtrak)
- Current pickup(s): Pantograph
- Traction motors: Two TTB 665 A1, 1.5 kV self-ventilating
- Transmission: Electric
- Loco brake: Air
- Train brakes: Air
- Safety systems: KVB
Performance figures
- Maximum speed: 160 or 200 km/h (99 or 124 mph)
- Power output: 5,900 kW (7,900 hp)
- Tractive effort: 263 kN (59,000 lb_{f}) at 74 km/h (46 mph); 121 kN (27,000 lb_{f}) at 161 km/h (100 mph)
Career
- Operators: SNCF, Amtrak
- Numbers: CC 6501 to CC 6578
- Official name: CC 6500
- Nicknames: Nez cassé (broken nose), French Fry (Amtrak demonstrator)
- Delivered: from 1969 to 1975 (1996 for the ex CC21000)
- First run: 1969
- Last run: 2007
- Retired: From 2004 to 2007
- Preserved: 6503, 6530, 6534, 6549, 6558, 6561, 6565, 6570, 6575

The SNCF Class CC 6500 is a class of 1.5 kV DC electric locomotives. The CC 6500 was, together with the CC 40100 and diesel CC 72000, the first generation of the 'Nez Cassé' family of locomotives and designed for hauling express trains with speeds up to 200 km/h (124 mph) but also used for heavy freight trains. Among the trains they hauled in their first years of service were the SNCF flagship train Le Mistral and Trans Europ Express trains Aquitaine, Le Capitole and l'Étendard.

== Technical details ==
The locomotives had 3-axle monomotor bogies with each set of 3 axles coupled by gears. Speed regulation was by rheostats and series-parallel control. The motors had double armatures so there were four "demi-motors" which allowed three motor groupings: full series, series-parallel and full parallel. The power controller had 28 steps.

The second batch of CC 6500 locomotives were equipped with third-rail electrical pickups for use on the steeply-graded Maurienne line in the Alps, which were removed when the line was converted to overhead catenary supplies.

== Production ==
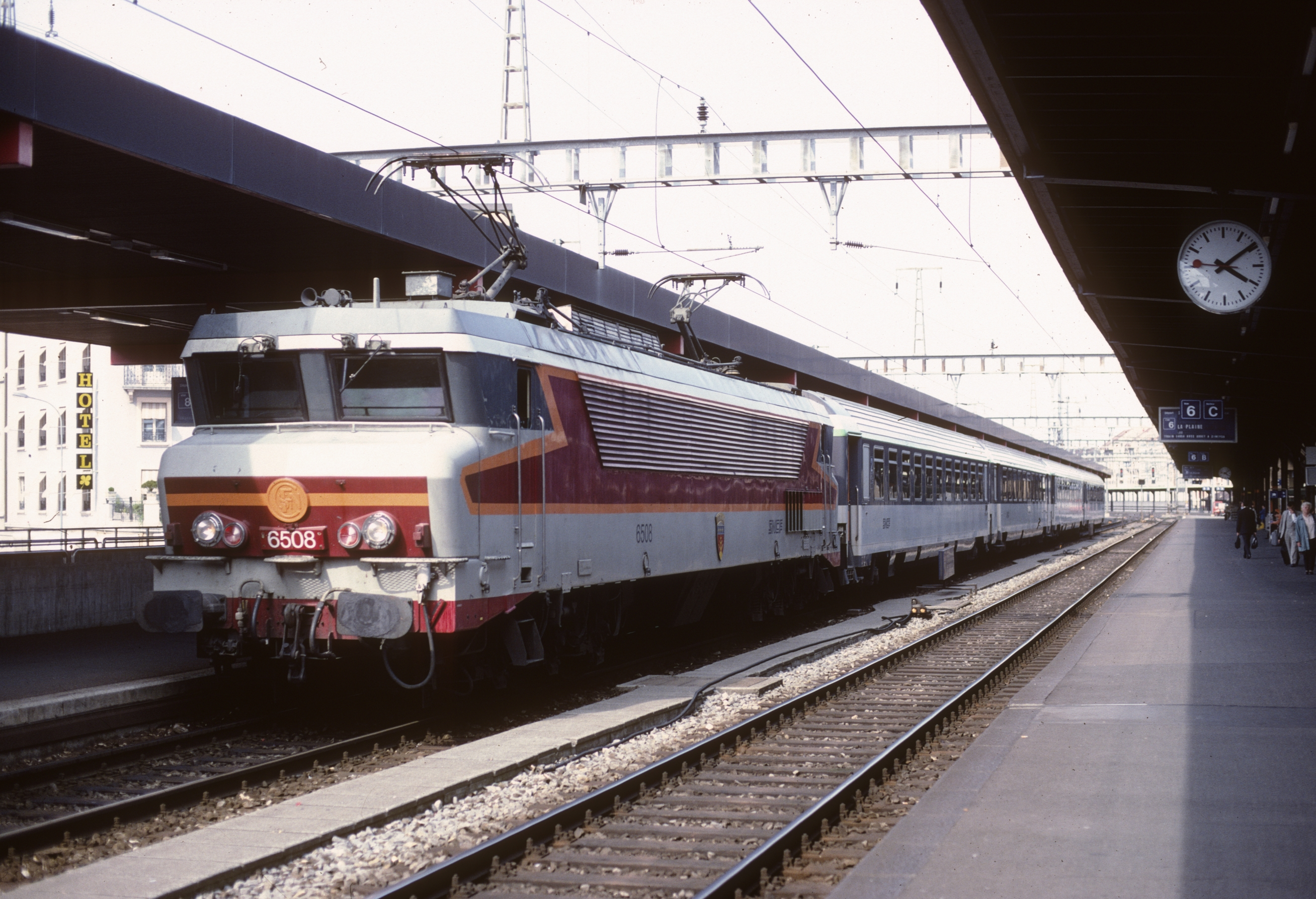
CC 6508 pulling into Geneva (Genève Cornavin) station in 1993

Between 1969 and 1976 a total of 74 were built, with the last of this class taken out of service in 2007. Four more were built as dual-system 1.5 kV DC/25 kV AC locomotives, and designated Class CC 21000. These were reconfigured for use as DC-only locomotives between 1995 and 1996, taking the total of CC 6500 locomotives to 78.

== Names ==
Around half the class received names. Most are named after French towns, except CC 6572, which was named to commemorate the World War II railway workers resistance group, Résistance-Fer.

Number	Name	Number	Name
CC 6502	Ivry-sur-Seine	CC 6526	Choisy-le-Roi
CC 6504	Vitry-sur-Seine	CC 6527	Amboise
CC 6505	Sainte-Foy-la-Grande	CC 6529	Issoudun
CC 6508	Montauban	CC 6530	Cahors
CC 6509	Agen	CC 6531	Saint-Pierre-des-Corps
CC 6510	Carcassonne	CC 6533	Beautiran
CC 6512	Narbonne	CC 6534	Béziers
CC 6513	Cognac	CC 6535	Saint-Chamond
CC 6514	Poitiers	CC 6536	Annecy
CC 6515	Blois	CC 6537	Salon-de-Provence
CC 6516	Châtellerault	CC 6560	Oullins
CC 6517	Arcachon	CC 6563	Laval
CC 6518	Orléans	CC 6564	Beaune
CC 6519	Angoulème	CC 6566	Maubeuge
CC 6520	Ruffec	CC 6567	Brest
CC 6521	Saintes	CC 6569	La Mulatière
CC 6522	Limoges	CC 6570	Armentières
CC 6523	Brive	CC 6571	Jeumont
CC 6524	Toulouse	CC 6572	Résistance-Fer
CC 6525	Châteauroux	CC 6574	Dole
