= SNCF Class BB 16100 =

BB 16100
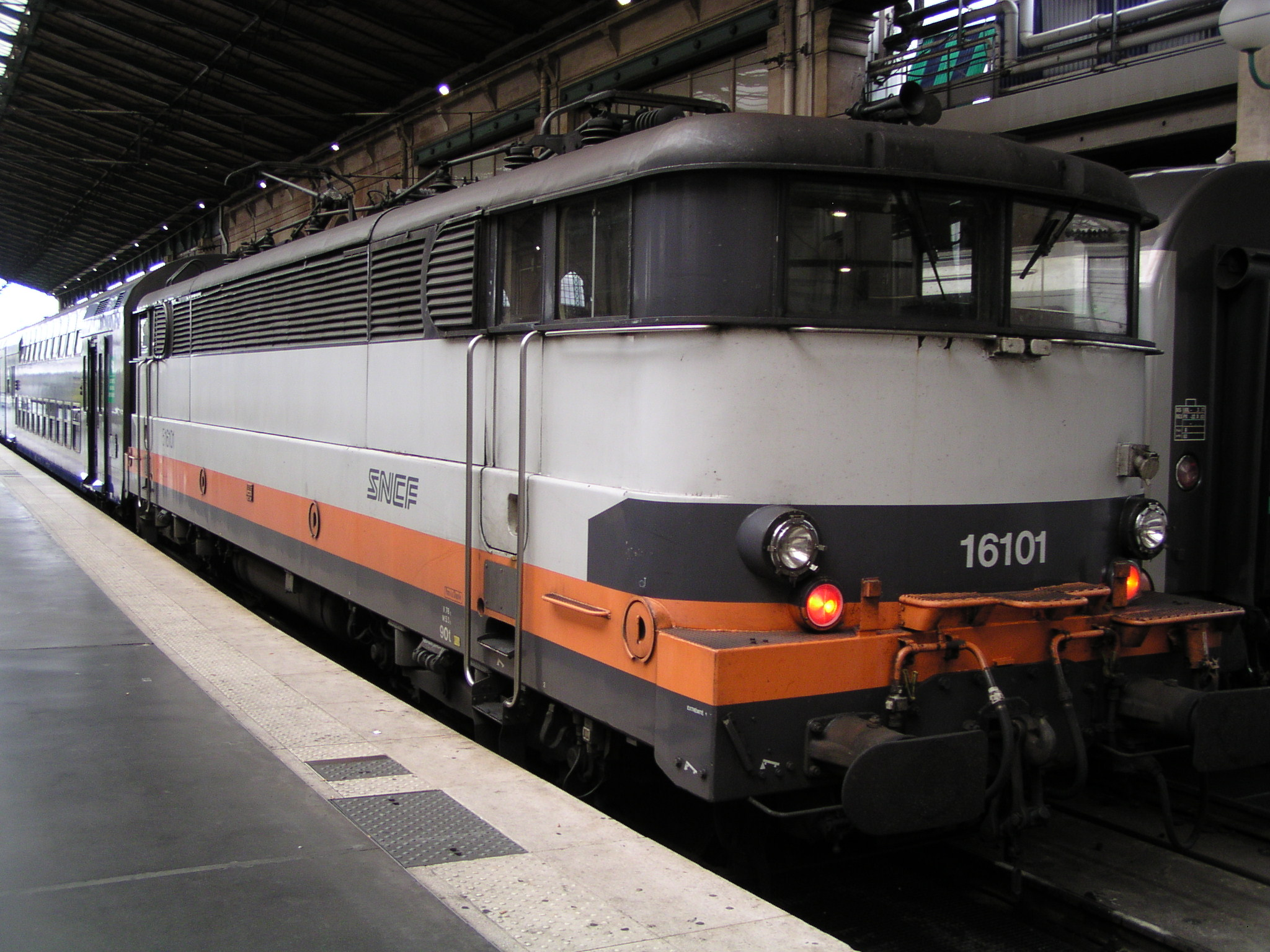
- BB 16101 at Paris Gare du Nord, 5 September 2005.
Type and origin
- Power type: Electric
- Builder: Le Matériel de Traction Électrique (MTE)
- Build date: 1958–1963
- Rebuild date: 1991–1994
- Number rebuilt: 15
Specifications
- Configuration
  - UIC: Bo′Bo′
- Gauge: 1,435 mm (4 ft 8 1/2 in) standard gauge
- Length: 16.68 m (54 ft 9 in)
- Loco weight: 88 tonnes (87 long tons; 97 short tons)
- Electric system/s: 25 kV 50 Hz AC Catenary
- Current pickup(s): Pantograph
- Traction motors: Jeumont TO 136-8, 4 off
Performance figures
- Maximum speed: 160 km/h (100 mph)
- Power output: 4,130 kW (5,540 hp)
- Tractive effort: 309 kN (69,000 lbf)
Career
- Operators: SNCF
- Numbers: BB 16101 – BB 16115

The SNCF Class BB 16100 electric locomotives were converted from class BB 16000s by fitting TDM push-pull equipment to work the Paris Nord to St. Quentin/Amiens services as well as Paris St Lazare - Rouen.

== Conversions ==
- 16101 from 16004
- 16102 from 16017
- 16103 from 16046
- 16104 from 16040
- 16105 from 16014
- 16106 from 16009
- 16107 from 16048
- 16108 from 16026
- 16109 from 16023
- 16110 from 16035
- 16111 from 16016
- 16112 from 16010
- 16113 from 16030
- 16114 from 16062
- 16115 from 16060
