= SNCF Class C 61000 =

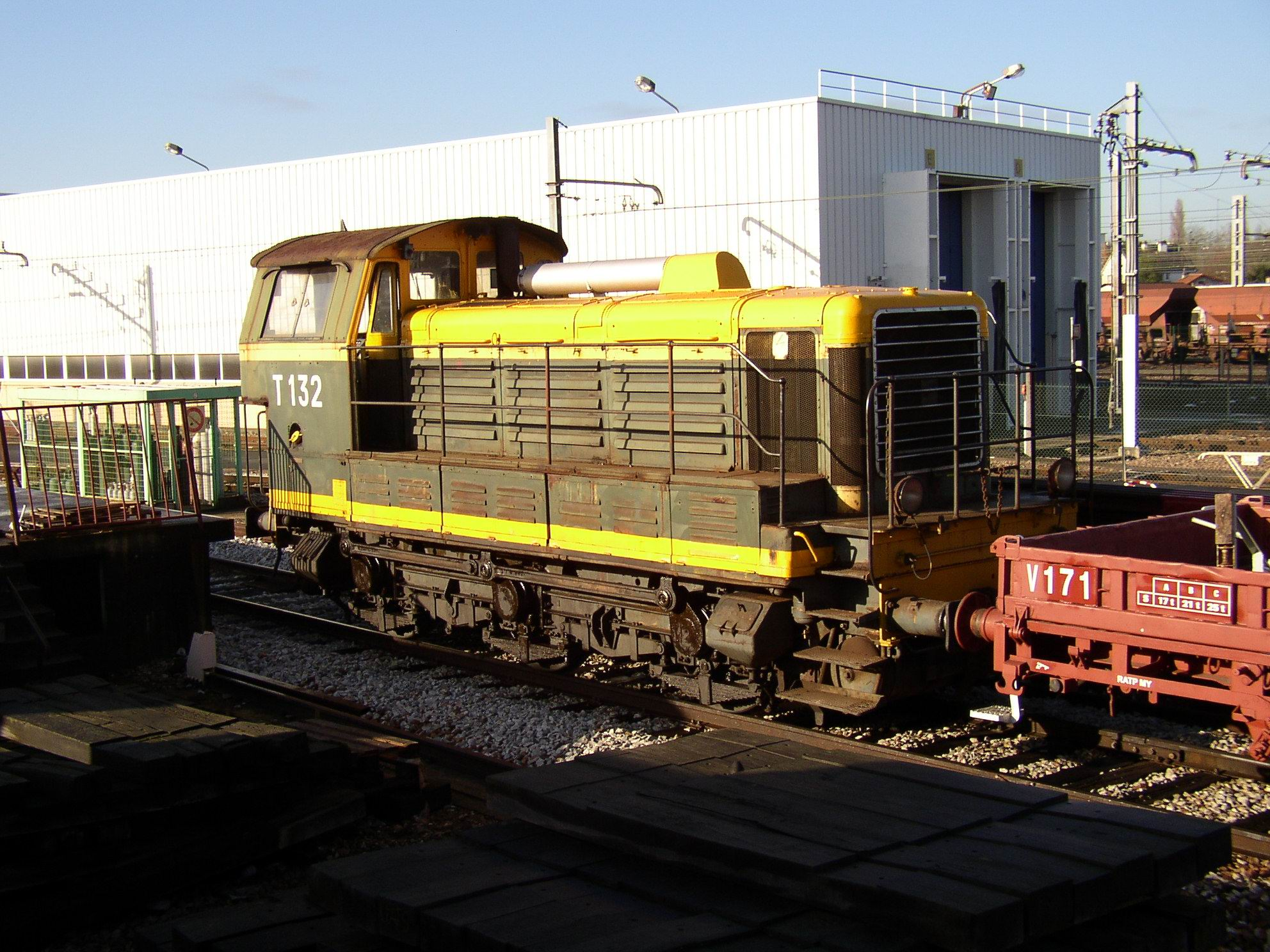
- C61000 class locomotive in service with RATP as number T132
Type and origin
- Power type: Diesel electric
- Builder: Compagnie Électro-Mécanique
- Build date: 1950-1953
Specifications
- Configuration
  - UIC: C
- Gauge: 1,435 mm (4 ft 8 1/2 in) standard gauge
- Length: 9,500 mm (31 ft 2 in)
- Loco weight: 53 tonnes (52 long tons; 58 short tons)
- Prime mover: Sulzer 6 LDA 22,
- Engine type: In line diesel engine
- Traction motors: Two CEM GDTM 553
- Cylinders: 6
- Transmission: Diesel-electric transmission
Performance figures
- Maximum speed: 60 km/h (37 mph)
- Power output: 375 kW (503 hp) at 890 rpm
Career
- Operators: SNCF, RATP

The SNCF Class C 61000 (+ TC 61100) diesel shunters were built by Compagnie Electro-Méchanique (CEM) between 1950 and 1953. 48 locomotives were built, numbered C 61001–61048. They were used for heavy shunting duties around Le Havre.

Two traction motors were fitted to the two end axles, all the axles being coupled by coupling rods.

== Slave units ==
In addition, twelve slave units, numbered TC 61101-61112 were built, to provide extra power. These slave units did not have a cab, thus reducing their weight.

== Disposal ==
These locomotive have now been withdrawn from SNCF service. However, several have been preserved, and a few were sold to for further use with industry or the Paris Metro operator RATP.
