= SNCF Class BB 9200 =

Class of 92 French Bo′Bo′ electric locomotives

SNCF BB 9200
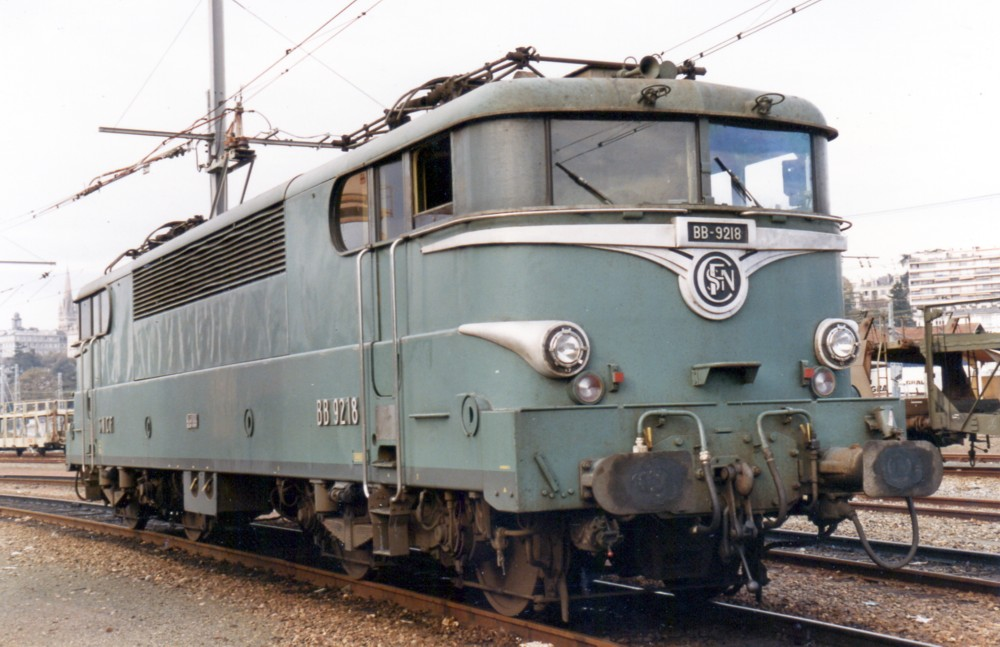
- SNCF BB 9218 in the original livery at Pau in 1986
Type and origin
- Power type: Electric
- Builder: Creusot-Loire, Jeumont-Schneider and Compagnie Électro-Mécanique
- Build date: 1957–1964
- Total produced: 92
Specifications
- Configuration
  - UIC: Bo′Bo′
- Gauge: 1,435 mm (4 ft 8 1/2 in)
- Wheel diameter: 1,250 mm (4 ft 1 1/4 in)
- Wheelbase: 9.200 m (30 ft 2 1/4 in)
  - Bogie: 3.200 m (10 ft 6 in)
- Length: 16.200 m (53 ft 1 3/4 in)
- Width: 2.980 m (9 ft 9 3/8 in)
- Height: 4.191 m (13 ft 9 in)
- Loco weight: 82.8 tonnes (81.5 long tons; 91.3 short tons)
- Electric system/s: 1500 V DC
- Current pickups: Pantograph, type G1, 2 off
- Traction motors: GLM 931 B, 1500 volt, force ventilated, 4 off
Performance figures
- Maximum speed: 200 km/h (124 mph)
- Power output
  - Continuous: 3,850 kW (5,160 hp)
Career
- Operators: SNCF
- Numbers: BB 9201 – BB 9292
- Retired: 2003–2015

The SNCF Class BB 9200 1500 V DC electric locomotives were built by Schneider-Jeumont/CEM between 1957-1964. 92 of them were built, the last being withdrawn in 2014.

== History ==
These locomotives are products of the Jacquemin product family, offspring of the prototype BB 9004, and named after the engineer who designed their bogies.

The locomotives were designed for a maximum speed of 160 km/h (99 mph) and were the first such engines in France. In the late sixties, a small group of locomotives was converted for 200 km/h (120 mph) operation, hauling prestige TEE trains like the Capitole - these locomotives were called the BB 9200 Capitole. These types were later superseded by the CC 6500 locomotives. Some of these locomotives covered more than 10 million kilometres (6.2 million miles) before they were withdrawn.

== Service ==
The regular services of the BB 9200 locomotives were inter-regional trains between Paris Montparnasse and Le Mans, between Paris Austerlitz and Tours and between Paris Gare de Lyon, Dijon and Lyon. Some were in service on freight trains. Phasing out of the class was completed by 2014.

== Names ==
Two members of the class were named.

Number	Name	Number	Name
9248	La Teste-de-Buch	9280	Arpajon

== BB 9200 Capitole ==
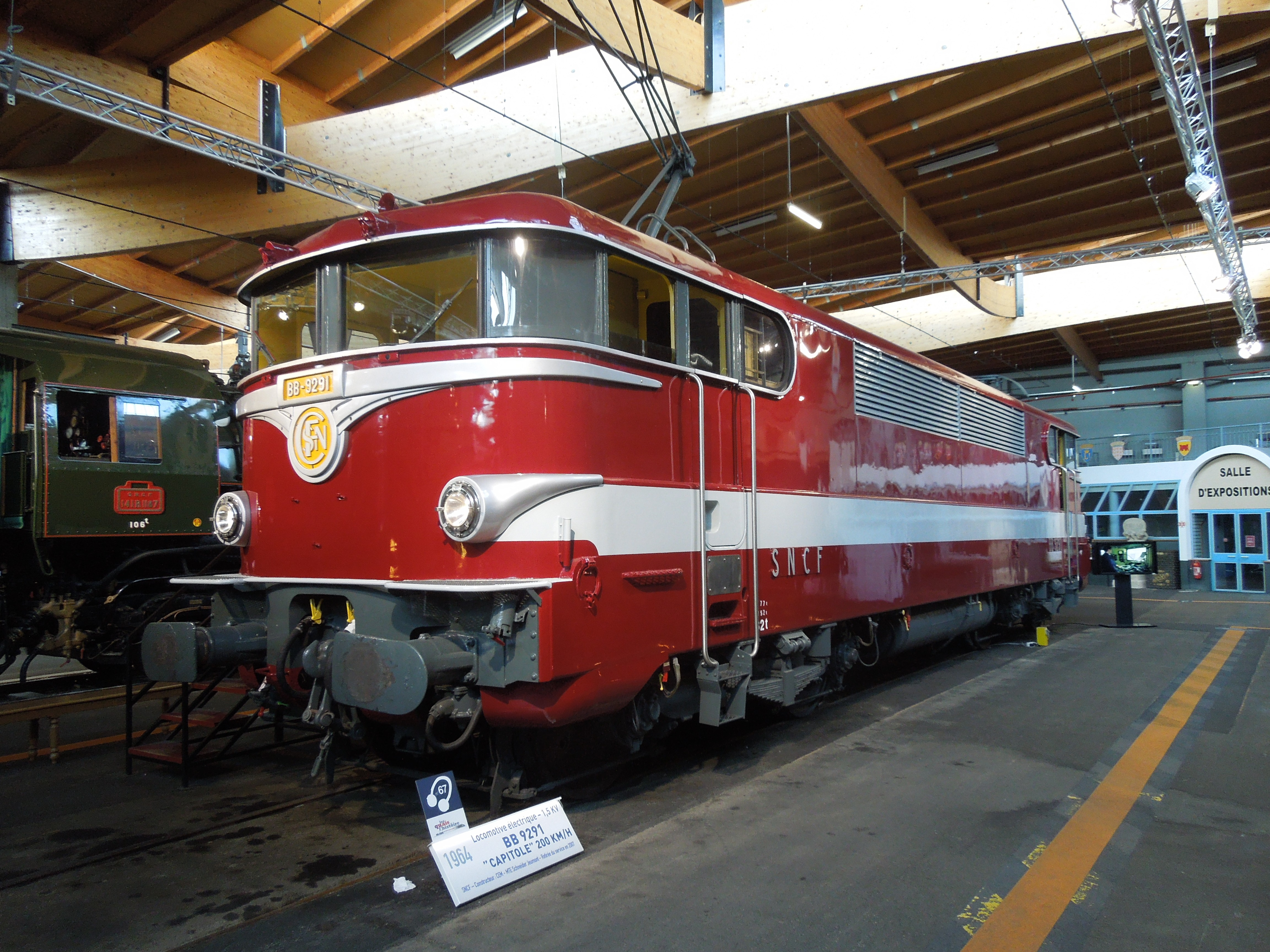
BB Rouge in Mulhouse

The BB 9200 Capitole was a variant of the SNCF Class BB 9200 locomotive specially constructed for operating high speed trains running at speeds greater than 160 km/h or 99 mph). Due to the special colour scheme they were also called the BB rouge. They also sported Capitole front plates and single-arm pantographs; the rest of the class had diamond pantographs. From 1967 to 1970 the SNCF started the high speed service with the Capitole between Paris and Toulouse. This route included some sections with a speed of more than 200 km/h (120 mph).

- BB 9291 and 9292 : locomotive variants constructed for 250 km/h (160 mph).
- BB 9278, 9281, 9282 and 9288 : locomotive variants, that were conversions of standard members of the class, and limited to 200 km/h (120 mph).

Models of the BB 9200 rouges with their Capitol plates were produced by Märklin, Lima, Jouef and Roco and REE.
