= Résistance-Fer =

Résistance-Fer (French; Railway-Resistance, or "Iron-Resistance") was a French Resistance group against the German occupation of France during the Second World War.

This specific movement was essentially composed of French railway workers from the SNCF and played an active role in the French Resistance.

The Résistance-Fer concentrated its activities on:

- reporting the movement of German troops to the Allied forces
- the sabotage of railway infrastructure and rolling stock

== Personnel ==
Jean-Guy Bernard, Louis Armand and Jean Marthelot established the group in 1943 with the help of the director of the SNCF Albert Guerville and of the Cohors-Asturies and Emilie Plouviez groups. Résistance-Fer formed part of the network of Forces Françaises Combattantes which was part of the Délégation Générale. After the arrest of Jean-Guy Bernard in January 1944, Armand took charge of the group under the control of Jacques Chaban-Delmas. Philippe Leroy was named head of the movement in northern France while Louis Lavignon, part of Combat, led the group in the southeastern Rhone-Alpes region in 1944. He was arrested on May 17, 1944, and died in the deportation camp of Neuengamme.

== Activity ==
The actions of Résistance-Fer were especially effective during the liberation of France. Immediately before and after the Allied invasions during Normandy and Provence in 1944, the sabotage of rail transportation became more frequent and proved highly effective first in preventing German troop deployments to the front and later in hindering their retreat.

For participating in the Resistance, 150 Résistance-Fer agents were shot and approximately 500 deported, with approximately half dying in deportation.

== Recognition ==
On 17 May 1945, General Charles de Gaulle praised the group: "The railway men and women of the Résistance-Fer have fought, regardless of the risks, during the entire occupation with persistence, courage and discipline for France and freedom".

Their activities featured in René Clément's film La Bataille du Rail (1946), which opened the first post-war Cannes film festival, a film which is credited as being produced by them, with permission of the Centre Nationale de la Resistance, (CNR).

SNCF named locomotive BB 6572 Résistance-Fer in their honour.
