= Compagnie Électro-Mécanique =

Compagnie Electro-Mecanique
- Company type: Subsidiary
- Industry: Rail transport
- Founded: 1932; 94 years ago
- Defunct: 1983
- Successor: Alstom
- Headquarters: Lyon, France
- Area served: Worldwide
- Products: Locomotives; High-speed trains Intercity and commuter trains Trams; People movers Signalling systems

Compagnie Électro-Mécanique (CEM) was a French electrical engineering manufacturer based in Paris, Le Havre, Lyon, Le Bourget, Nancy, Dijon. It was a subsidiary company of Brown, Boveri & Cie. It was originally established in 1885.

== Production ==
The company produced DC motors, AC motors, generators, turbines, transformers and railway locomotives. Examples of railway locomotives included SNCF Class C 61000 and SNCF Class CC 65500.

== Acquisition by Alsthom ==
It was acquired by Alsthom in 1983.
