= Le Mistral (train) =

Former SNCF service between Nice and Paris

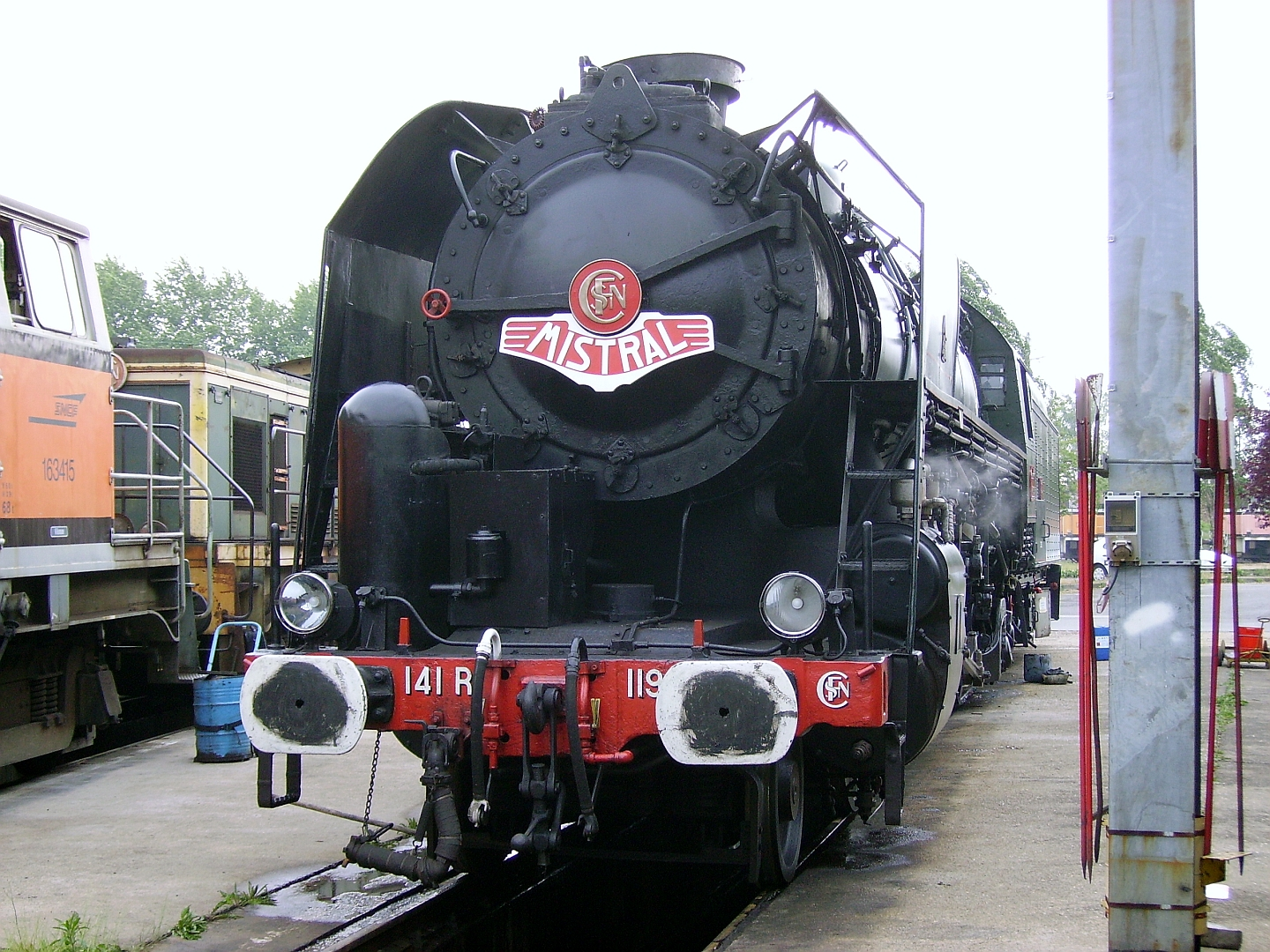
- Until the 1960s, the Mistral was hauled by a Class 141R steam locomotive.

Overview
- Service type: Rapide (1950–1965); Trans Europ Express (TEE) (1965–1981)
- Status: Replaced by a TGV
- Locale: France
- First service: 14 May 1950
- Last service: 22 May 1982
- Former operator: SNCF

Route
- Termini: Paris; Nice
- Service frequency: Daily

Technical
- Track gauge: 1,435 mm (4 ft 8 1/2 in)
Route map

Le Mistral, or the Mistral, was an express train between Paris and Nice in France. Introduced in 1950, it was operated by SNCF, and was regarded as the company's flagship train.

The train was named after the Mistral, a strong, cold and usually dry regional wind blowing from north or northwestern France to the coast of the Mediterranean around the Camargue region.

== History ==
The Mistral began its existence in 1950 as a mostly steam locomotive-hauled Rapide (express train) between Paris-Gare de Lyon and Marseille-Saint-Charles. Two years later, in 1952, its route was extended to Nice-Ville. By 1965, when it was integrated into the Trans Europ Express (TEE) system, it had become completely electric locomotive-hauled.

In the 1970s, Le Mistral included some unique amenities, among them a "bookstall, bar and hairdressing salon". The train also had two restaurant cars; the Wagons-Lits Company provided the on-board catering. In 1975, a writer for Fodor's called Le Mistral "perhaps the most luxurious train in Europe".

The train's final day as a TEE was 26 September 1981, as the next day saw the introduction of the first TGV service in France, in that same corridor, and the downgrading of Le Mistral to a two-class "Rapide" train, albeit continuing to use the same first-class coaches for the train's first-class section.

Le Mistral was discontinued entirely in 1982, after being replaced by TGV service.

== Speed ==
Still steam-hauled in 1964, the Mistral was one of the fastest trains in France, with an average speed of 132.8 kilometres per hour (82.5 mph) on the 314.1-kilometre (195.2 mi) Paris – Dijon section, as well as an average speed of 129 km/h on its Valence – Avignon section. It also had the distinction of being the train with the "world's fastest schedule for [a route of] over 500 miles", averaging 120.2 kilometres per hour (74.7 mph) on its 861.6-kilometre (535.4 mi) Paris – Marseille section. Slower speeds on the more "rugged country" between Marseille and Nice brought the average speed down to 104.9 kilometres per hour (65.2 mph) over the full 1,086 km route from Paris to Nice, which was nevertheless a relatively high average speed for 1964. Soon after that, electrification of the route was completed, and Le Mistral began being hauled by modern electric locomotives; starting in 1969, it was Class CC 6500 locomotives. This change along with new passenger coaches increased the train's average speed and shortened the travel time, the latter going from 10 hours, 21 minutes, in 1964 to just over 9 hours in June 1969.

== See also ==
- History of rail transport in France
- List of named passenger trains of Europe
