= Le Capitole (train) =

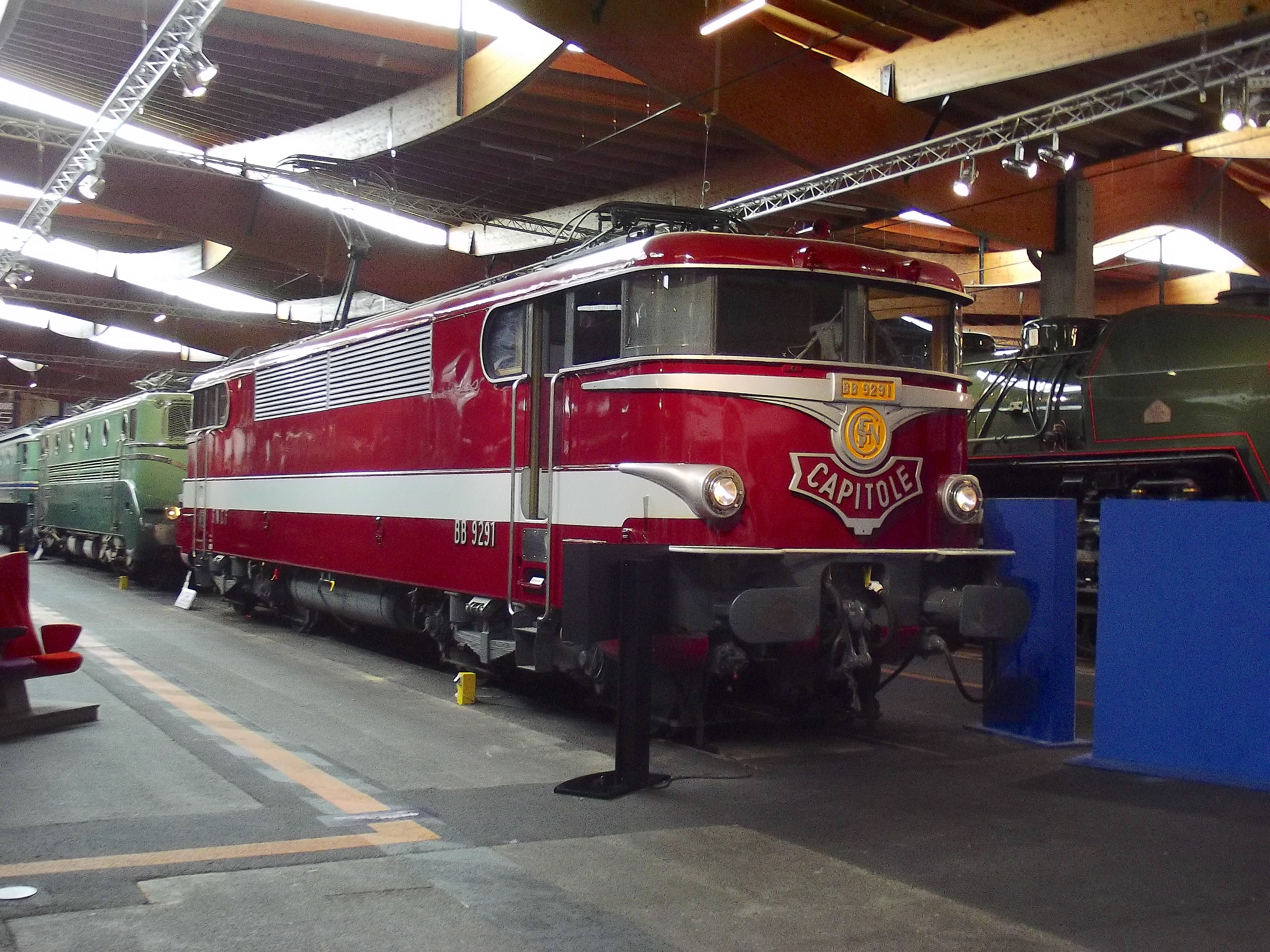
- The BB 9200 hauled Le Capitole at 200 km/h (120 mph).

Overview
- Service type: Rapide; (1960–1970); Trans Europ Express (TEE); (1970–1984); Rapide; (1982–1991)
- Status: Replaced by a TGV
- Locale: France
- First service: 15 November 1960; 64 years ago
- Last service: September 1991; 33 years ago
- Former operator(s): SNCF

Route
- Termini: Paris-Gare d'Austerlitz; Toulouse-Matabiau
- Distance travelled: 713 km (443 mi)
- Service frequency: Daily; (1960–1968); Twice daily; (1968–1991)

Technical
- Rolling stock: Locomotive: BB 9200; (1960-1967); Coaches: DEV-Inox; (1960-1967); Locomotive: BB 9200 Capitole; (1967-1970); Coaches: UIC-Y; (1967-1970); Locomotive: CC 6500; (1970-1991); Coaches: Voiture Grand Confort; (1970-1991)
- Track gauge: 1,435 mm (4 ft 8 1/2 in)
- Electrification: 1.5 kV DC
Route map
- The route of Le Capitole (red and orange) and its TGV replacement (blue and grey).

Le Capitole (alternatively written Capitole) was an express train between Paris and Toulouse in France. Introduced in 1960, it was operated by the Société Nationale des Chemins de fer français ("French National Railway Corporation") (SNCF). It was also the SNCF's first foray into high-speed commercial service above 160 km/h (99 mph).

The train was named after the Capitole de Toulouse, a mainly 18th century building in Toulouse that houses the Hôtel de Ville, the Théâtre du Capitole (opera house), and the Donjon du Capitole (16th century).

== Route ==
The route of Le Capitole was from Paris via the Paris–Bordeaux railway as far as Orléans, and then via the Orléans–Montauban railway to Montauban, and the Bordeaux–Sète railway to Toulouse. The train had the following stops:

- Paris-Austerlitz – Limoges-Bénédictins – Brive-la-Gaillarde – Cahors – Montauban-Ville-Bourbon – Toulouse-Matabiau

== History ==
Le Capitole began its existence as an evening first-class-only Rapide (express train) between Paris-Gare d'Austerlitz and Toulouse-Matabiau, departing in the late afternoon in both directions. In 1967, it became the first European train to be scheduled to run at 200 km/h (120 mph).

In autumn 1968, a second train carrying the same name was added, operating in the morning in both directions on the route.

In 1970, Le Capitole was integrated into the Trans Europ Express (TEE) system. The morning TEE departed from both Paris and Toulouse at 7:45 a.m. and operated daily except Sundays. The other departed in the late afternoon and ran seven days a week. Both trains were TEEs and both were normally called simply Le Capitole, although the morning train was sometimes referred to informally as "Le Capitole (du matin)" (the "morning Capitole"). Each train included a 48-seat restaurant car operated by the Wagon-Lits Company.

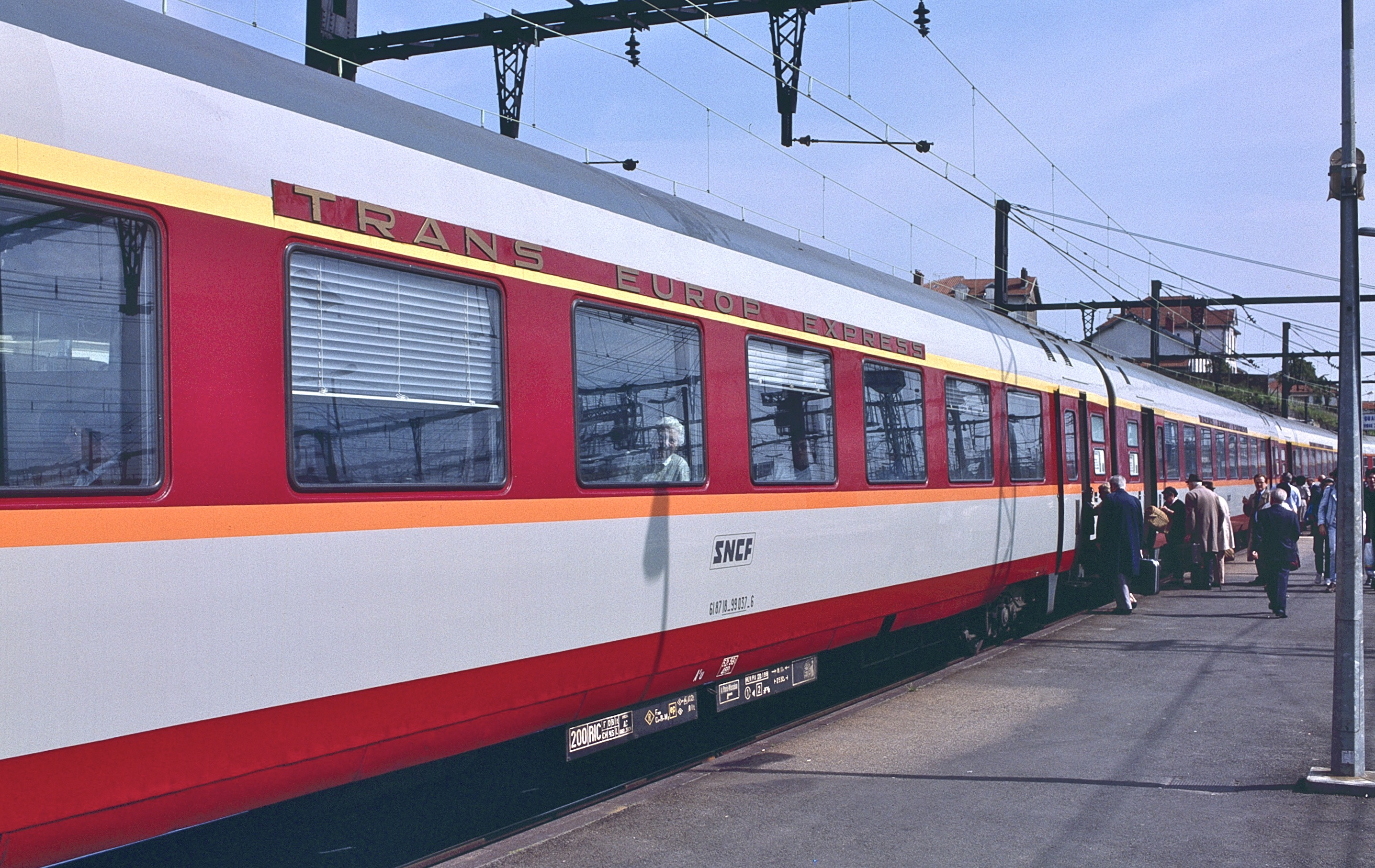
Ex-TEE cars making up the first-class section of Le Capitole du Matin in 1988, pictured loading at Limoges

In 1982, the southbound morning train and northbound evening train were downgraded to a two-class Rapide, while the northbound morning train and southbound evening train remained a first-class-only Trans Europ Express. All four trains were still called Le Capitole. Also, the remaining TEE service now operated only six days a week: daily except Saturdays northbound and daily except Sundays southbound.

In 1984, the remaining TEE trains on the route were downgraded to two-class Rapide. The two morning trains (74/75) became Le Capitole du Matin, and the two evening trains (76/77) became Le Capitole du Soir (the "evening Capitole").

Le Capitole was discontinued in 1991, one year after the introduction of through TGV service between Paris and Toulouse via Bordeaux, a portion of which followed a higher-speed line. The TGV route was longer, at 827 km compared with Le Capitole's 713 km route (via Limoges), but had a travel time that was one hour shorter: 5 hours, 10–13 minutes (depending on direction), compared with 6 hours, 2–20 minutes, on the more direct route.

== See also ==
- History of rail transport in France
- List of named passenger trains of Europe
