= List of acronyms: D =

This list contains acronyms, initialisms, and pseudo-blends that begin with the letter D.

For the purposes of this list:

- acronym = an abbreviation pronounced as if it were a word, e.g., SARS = severe acute respiratory syndrome, pronounced to rhyme with cars
- initialism = an abbreviation pronounced wholly or partly using the names of its constituent letters, e.g., CD = compact disc, pronounced cee dee
- pseudo-blend = an abbreviation whose extra or omitted letters mean that it cannot stand as a true acronym, initialism, or portmanteau (a word formed by combining two or more words).

(a) = acronym, e.g.: SARS – (a) severe acute respiratory syndrome
(i) = initialism, e.g.: CD – (i) compact disc
(p) = pseudo-blend, e.g.: UNIFEM – (p) United Nations Development Fund for Women
(s) = symbol (none of the above, representing and pronounced as something else; for example: MHz – megahertz)

Some terms are spoken as either acronym or initialism, e.g., VoIP, pronounced both as voyp and V-O-I-P.

(Main list of acronyms)

- d – (s) Deci
- D – (s) Deuterium

== DA ==
- da – (s) Danish language (ISO 639-1 code) – deca
- DA – (s) Denmark (FIPS 10-4 country code) – (i) Debtors Anonymous – (i) U.S. Department of the Army – District Attorney
- DAB – Digital Audio Broadcasting
- DAC – Digital to Analog Converter
- DACT – (i) Data Automated Communications Terminal – Dissimilar Air Combat Training
- DAD – (s) Da Nang International Airport (IATA code)
- DADVSI – (i) Loi sur le droit d’auteur et les droits voisins dans la société de l’information (French, "Law on copyrights and related rights in the information society")
- DAES – (i) Defence Acquisition Executive Summary – (UK MoD) Directorate of Analysis, Experimentation and Simulation
- DAF – (a) Dissolved Air Flotation, a technique used in water treatment
- DAFIF – (a) Digital Aeronautical Flight Information File
- DAK – (a) Disney's Animal Kingdom
- DA&M – (i) (U.S.) Director, Administration & Management
- dan – (s) Danish language (ISO 639-2 code)
- DAO – (i) Division Ammunition Officer
- DAQ – (p) Data acquisition – (i) Delivered Audio Quality
- DARE – (a) Drug Abuse Resistance Education
- DARO – (i/a) (U.S.) Defense Airborne Reconnaissance Office
- DARPA – (a) U.S. Defense Advanced Research Projects Agency
- DART – (a) Disaster Assistance Response Team – Dublin Area Rapid Transit
- DAS – (a) Defensive Aids Suite
- DASD – (i) (U.S.) Deputy Assistant Secretary of Defense
- DASL – (i) Datapoint's Advanced Systems Language
- DAU – (i) (U.S.) Defense Acquisition University
- DAWN – (a) (U.S.) Drug Abuse Warning Network

== DB ==
- dB – (s) Decibel
- Db – (s) Dubnium
- DB – (i) Database – Deutsche Bahn
- d/b/a – (i) doing business as
- DBA – (i) De Bellis Antiquitatis (miniature wargaming rules)
- DBBL – (i) (U.S. Army Simulation Center) Dismounted Battlespace Battle Laboratory
- DBCS – (i) Double Byte Character Set
- DBDO – (i) Desert BDO
- DBE – (i) Dame Commander of the Order of the British Empire
- DBF – (i) Detection By Fire (weapon launch signature)
- DBM – (i) De Bellis Multitudinis (miniature wargaming rules) – Detection By Movement (military target)
- DBR – (i) De Bellis Renationis (miniature wargaming rules)
- DBRA – (i) Davis–Bacon Related Acts
- DBS – (i) Direct Broadcast Services (television)
  - Disclosure and Barring Service (UK)
  - Double-Barreled Shotgun

== DC ==
- DC
  - (i) da capo
  - Italian Democrazia Cristiana
  - Digital Compass
  - Direct Current
  - (s) District of Columbia (postal symbol)
  - (i) Douglas Aircraft Company
  - Dublin Core
  - Duty Cycle
  - Disconnected
- DCA
  - (i) Defensive Counter Air
  - Drum Corps Associates
  - (p) DiChloroAcetate
  - (s) Ronald Reagan Washington National Airport (IATA code)
- DCAA – (i) (U.S.) Defense Contract Audit Agency
- DCAS – (i) Devon and Cornwall Archery Society
- DCC
  - (i) Dallas Christian College
  - Digital Command Control (model railroading)
  - Direct Client-to-Client (Internet Relay Chat)
  - Dismounted Close Combat
- DCCP – (i) Datagram Congestion Control Protocol
- DCD – (i) [Organ] Donation after Cardiac Death
- DCDC – Development, Concepts and Doctrine Centre
- DCE – (i) Data Communication Equipment
- DCFC – (i) Death Cab for Cutie
- DCI
  - (i) Detection, Classification and Identification
  - Drum Corps International
  - Duellists' Convocation International, later known simply by the initials before changing its name to the current Wizards Play Network
- DCIM – (p) Digital Camera Images
- DCIMS
  - (i) Dental Classification Information Management System
  - Dismounted Combat Identification Marking System
- DCL – Disney Cruise Line
- DCN – Deacon
- DCOM – Disney Channel Original Movie
- DCOP – (i) Desktop Communication Protocol
- DCSOPS – (p) Deputy Chief of Staff for Operations and plans
- DCW – (i) Digital Chart of the World
- DCYSC – (i) Discovery Channel Young Scientist Challenge

== DD ==
- DD – many, including due diligence and dear daughter (increasingly prevalent on social mailing lists, blogs, and bulletin boards); see entry
- D&D
  - (i) Dungeons & Dragons
  - Diversion and Distress (Air Traffic Control)
- DDA
  - (i) Digital Differential Analyzer (graphics algorithm)
  - Digital Differential Analyzer
  - Deputy District Attorney
- DDD
  - (i) Data Display Debugger
  - Digital Digital Digital (CD mastering)
- DDL – (i) Digital Data Link
- DDLC – Doki Doki Literature Club!
  - DDLC+ – the expanded version, Doki Doki Literature Club Plus!
- DDN – (i) U.S. Defense Data Network
- DDoS – (i) Distributed Denial of Service
- DDP
  - (i) Danish Design Prize
  - Deutsche Demokratische Partei (German, "German Democratic Party" – former political party in Weimar Germany)
  - Diamond Dallas Page (American professional wrestler)
- DDR
  - (i) Dance Dance Revolution
  - Deutsche Demokratische Republik (German, "German Democratic Republic" (GDR), East Germany)
  - Double Data Rate
  - (s) East Germany (ISO 3166 trigram, obsolete since 1990)
- DDR&E – (i) (U.S.) Defense Department Research and Engineering
- DDS – (i) Doctor of Dental Surgery
- DDT
  - (i) Dichloro-Diphenyl-Trichloroethane (insecticide)
  - Dramatic Dream Team, the original name of the Japanese professional wrestling promotion DDT Pro-Wrestling
  - Dynamic Debugging Tool (computing)

== DE ==
- de – (s) German language (ISO 639-1 code)
- DE – (s) Delaware (postal symbol) – Germany (ISO 3166 digram)
- DEA – (i) Drug Enforcement Administration
- DEA – (i) Drug Enforcement Agency
- DEC
  - (a/i) Department of Environmental Conservation
  - Digital Equipment Corporation
  - Disasters Emergency Committee
- DeCA – (p) (U.S.) Defense Commissary Agency
- DECSIM – (p) Model DEComposition and SIMulation algorithm – Directed Energy Combat SIMulation
- DECT – (a) Digital European Cordless Telephone
- DEERS – (a) Defense Enrollment Eligibility Reporting System (US Department of Defense database of individuals eligible for certain benefits)
- DEFCON – (p) Defence readiness condition
- DEFRA – (a) (UK) Department for Environment, Food and Rural Affairs
- DEI - Diversity, Equity, and Inclusion
- DELT – (a) Dual Ended Line Test (ing)
- DEM
  - (i) Data Exchange Mechanism
  - Digital Elevation Model
- DEN – (s) Denmark (IOC and FIFA trigram, but not ISO 3166)
- DEPSECDEF – (p) (U.S.) Deputy Secretary of Defense
- DERA – (a) British Defence Evaluation and Research Agency (1995–2001)
- DES – (i) Deep Ecliptic Survey
- deu – (s) German language (ISO 639-2 code)
- DEU – (s) Germany (ISO 3166 trigram)

== DF ==
- DF
  - (i) Direct Fire
  - Direction Finding
  - Distrito Federal (Spanish and Portuguese for "federal district")
- DFAD – (p) Digital Feature Analysis Data ("dee-fad")
- DFAS – (i) (U.S.) Defense Finance and Accounting Service
- DFB – (i) Deutscher Fußball-Bund (German for "German Football Association")
- DFCB – (i) Data Format Control Book
- DfID – (i) UK Department for International Development
- DFL
  - (i) Democratic–Farmer–Labor (the full designation of the Minnesota affiliate of the U.S. Democratic Party)
  - Deutsche Fußball Liga (German for "German Football League"), the operator of the top two leagues of German football
- DFM – (i) Dynamic Flowgraph Methodology
- DFM – (ii) Discrete Field Model see Superluminal motion
- DFSP – (i) Dermatofibrosarcoma protuberans
- DfT– (i) Department for Transport
- DFTBA – (i) Don't Forget To Be Awesome- a term commonly used by the Vlogbrothers

== DG ==
- DG – (i) Dei gratia (Latin, "by the grace of God") – Director-General – Data General
- DGA – (i) Direction générale des armées (French "Armed Forces General Directorate")
- DGAF – (I) Don't give a f***
- DGB – (i) Disinformation Governance Board
- DGD&D – (i) UK Directorate General of Development and Doctrine
- DGPS – (i) Differential GPS
- DGZ – (i) Desired Ground Zero

== DH ==
- DH – (i) dear husband (increasingly prevalent on social mailing lists, blogs, and bulletin boards) – Designated hitter
- DHA – (p) DocosaHexaenoic Acid
- DHHS – (i) (U.S.) Department of Health and Human Services
- DHL – (i) Dalsey, Hillblom, and Lynn (courier service)
- DHMIS - (i) Don't Hug Me I'm Scared
- DHRA – (i) (U.S.) DoD Human Resources Activity
- DHS – (i) U.S. Department of Homeland Security
- DHSS – (i) UK Department of Health and Social Security
- DHTFYSS – (i) U.S. Don't Have Time For You Silly S****
- DHY – (s) Dahomey (ISO 3166 trigram; became BEN for Benin in 1977)

== DI ==
- DIA – (i) U.S. Defense Intelligence Agency
- DIAC – (a) Department of Immigration and Citizenship (Australia)
- DiC – Design Island Centre (computing usually used in a teaching situation)
- DICASS – (p) DIrectional Command Activated Sonobuoy System
- DID – (i) Dissociative identity disorder
- DILLIGAD – (a) Do I Look Like I Give A Damn? (military shorthand, slightly less offensive than the following)
- DILLIGAF – (a) Do I Look Like I Give A Fuck? (military shorthand; the theme of biography, album, tour, and other products of Kevin Bloody Wilson)
- DIF – (i) Data Interchange Format
- DIFAR – (p) DIrectional Frequency Analysis and Recording
- DIME – (a) Dense inert metal explosive
- DIMM – (a) Dual In-line Memory Module (computing)
- DIN
  - (i) Deutsches Institut für Normung (German, "German Institute for Standardization")
  - Drug Identification Number (Canadian drug marketing requirement)
- DINA
  - (p/a) Diesel Nacional (Spanish, "National Diesel"—Mexican bus and truck manufacturer now known as DINA)
  - Dirección de Inteligencia Nacional (Spanish, "National Intelligence Directorate"—former secret police of Chile)
- DINKY – (a) Double Income, No Kids Yet
- DIP – (a) Dual In-line Package (electronics)
- DIPS – (a) Defense independent pitching statistics
- DIR – (i) Defence Industrial Research
- DIS
  - (i) Defence Intelligence Staff
  - (U.S.) Defense Investigative Service
  - Distributed Interactive Simulation
  - Draft International Standard (ISO)
- DISA
  - (a) U.S. Defense Information Systems Agency
  - Distinguished Individual Service Award
- DISCOM – (p) Division Support Command
- DISE – (i) Deployable Intelligence Support Element
- DISSTAF – (a) DIS Search and Target Acquisition Fidelity experiment
- DITY – (i/a) Do-It-Yourself
- div – (s) Dhivehi language (ISO 639-2 code)
- DIVAD – (p) Division Air Defence
- DIY – (i) Do It Yourself

== DJ ==
- DJ – (i) Disc Jockey – Dinner Jacket – (s) Djibouti (ISO 3166 digram; FIPS 10-4 country code)
- DJD – (i) Degenerative Joint Disease – Dublin Julian Day – Discoveries in the Judaean Desert
- DJF – (s) Djibouti franc (ISO 4217 currency code)
- DJI – (s) Djibouti (ISO 3166 trigram)
- DJS – (i) Director, Joint Staff

== DK ==
- DK – (s) Denmark (ISO 3166 digram)
- DKK – (s) Danish krone (ISO 4217 currency code)
- DKP – Don King Productions

== DL ==
- DL – Dexter's Laboratory
- DLA
  - (i) U.S. Defense Logistics Agency
  - Dental Laboratories Association
- DLI – (s) IATA code for Lien Khuong Airport
- DLIC – (i) Detachment Left-In-Contact
- DLIR – (i) Depot-Level Inspection and Repair
- DLL – (i) Dynamic Link Library
- DLPFC or DL-PFC – (i) DorsoLateral PreFrontal Cortex
- DLPMC – (i) DorsoLateral PreMotor Cortex
- DLR
  - (i) Deutsches Zentrum für Luft- und Raumfahrt (German, German Aerospace Centre)
  - Docklands Light Railway
- DLRP – (i) Data Link Reference Point
- DLS – (i) Deep Lens Survey
- DLSA – (i) (U.S.) Defense Legal Services Agency
- DLSc – (p) Diploma in Library Science
- DLSC
  - (i) U.S. Defense Logistics Services Center
  - U.S. Defense Logistics Support Command
  - Department of Library Special Collections (Western Kentucky University Libraries)
  - Direct Loan Servicing Center
  - Directorate of Land Strategic Concepts (Canada)
  - Dominican Lay Scholars Community
- DLTBGYD – Don't let the bastards grind you down

== DM ==
- DM
  - (s) Dominica (ISO 3166 digram)
  - (i) Dungeon Master (role-playing games)
- DMA
  - (i) Designated market area (primarily a U.S. term)
  - U.S. Defense Mapping Agency (became NIMA, then NGA)
  - Direct Memory Access (computing)
  - (s) Dominica (ISO 3166 trigram)
- DMC – (i) (U.S.) Defense Management Council
- DMCA – Digital Millennium Copyright Act
- DMD
  - (i) dentariae medicinae doctor (Latin, "doctor of dental medicine")
  - Digital Micromirror Device
  - Digital Multilayer Disk
- DMI – (i) Desktop Management Interface (computing)
- DMM – Digital Multimeter
- DMOC – (i) Distributed Mission Operations Centre
- DMOS – (i/a) Double Diffused MOS transistor ("dee-moss")
- DMPA – (i) (U.S.) Defense Medical Programs Activity
- DMPFC – (i) DorsoMedial PreFrontal Cortex
- DMPK – (i) Drug Metabolism and Pharmacokinetics
- DMRB – (i) Design Manual for Roads and Bridges
- DMS – (i) U.S. Defense Message System
- DMSO
  - (p) Dimethyl sulfoxide
  - (i) U.S. Defense Modeling & Simulation Office ("dim-so"), now Modeling and Simulation Coordination Office
- DMSP – (i) U.S. Defense Meteorological Satellite Program
- DMT – (i) Dimethyltryptamine
- DMU – (i) Diesel Multiple Unit, a method of connecting self-propelled railway vehicles together to form a train under the control of one driver.
- DMV – (i) Department of Motor Vehicles
- DMZ – (i) DeMilitarized Zone

== DN ==
- DN – (i) Deacon
- DNA
  - (i) U.S. Defense Nuclear Agency
  - Deoxyribonucleic acid
  - Douglas Noël Adams
- DNAW – (i) Day Night All Weather
- DND – (i) Department of National Defence (Canada) – Do not disturb
- DNDi – (i) Drugs for Neglected Diseases initiative
- DNDO – (i) U.S. Domestic Nuclear Detection Office
- DNM – (i) Defence Nuclear Material
- DNK – (s) Denmark (ISO 3166 trigram)
- DNR – (i) Do not resuscitate
- DNS – (i) Domain name system

== DO ==
- DO – (s) Dominica (FIPS 10-4 country code) – Dominican Republic (ISO 3166 digram) – (i) Doctor of Osteopathic Medicine
- DOA – (i) Dead On Arrival – Dead or Alive
- DOB – (i) Date Of Birth
- DoCRA – (a) Duty of Care Risk Analysis Standard
- DOD – (i) U.S. Department of Defense
- DODAF – (a) U.S. Department of Defense Architectural Framework
- DoDD – (i) U.S. Department of Defense Directive
- DoDEA – (i) (U.S.) Department of Defense Education Activity
- DOE – (i/a) U.S. Department of Energy
- DOGE – (a) Department of Government Efficiency
- DOHC – (i) Dual-OverHead-Cam engine
- DOI – (i) Digital Object Identifier – U.S. Department of the Interior
- DOM – (i) Deo optimo maximo (Latin, "to God, the best and greatest") – (a) Document Object Model – (s) Dominican Republic (ISO 3166 trigram)
- DOMS – (i) (U.S.) Director of Military Support
- DOP – (s) Dominican peso (ISO 4217 currency code)
- DORA – (a) Defence of the Realm Act
- DOS – (a) Denial of Service (DoS, cf. DDoS) – Density of State – Disk Operating System
- DOT – (i) Department of Transportation (U.S. federal or state) – Damage Over Time (common in World of Warcraft)
- DOTA – short-form for DEFENSE OF THE ANCIENTS a popular online epic game
- DotD – (i) Deal of the Day (marketing gimmick)
- DOTMLPF – (i) Doctrine, Organization, Training, Materiel, Leadership, Personnel, and Facilities (mnemonic)
- DOW – (i) Died of Wounds

== DP ==
- DP – (i) Division de production (Algerian petroleum company)
- DP – (i) Decision Point – Dynamic Programming
- DPA – (i) UK Defence Procurement Agency
- DPCO – (i) Double-Pole Change Over
- DPDT – (i) Double-Pole Double-Throw
- DPICM – (i) Dual-Purpose Improved Conventional Munition
- DPKO – (p) UN Department for Peacekeeping Operations
- DPMO – (i) (U.S.) Defense Prisoner of War/Missing Personnel Office
- DPPDB – (p) Digital Point Positioning Database
- DPRE – (p) Displaced Person or Refugee (plural Displaced Persons and Refugees) (originally Displaced Persons, Refugees, Evacuees)
- DPRK – (i) Democratic People's Republic of Korea
- DPST – (i) Double-Pole Single-Throw

== DQ ==
- DQ
  - (i) Dairy Queen
  - (s) Jarvis Island (FIPS 10-4 country code)

== DR ==
- DR – (i) Dead Reckoning – (s) Dominican Republic (FIPS 10-4 country code) – (i) Danmarks Radio (Danish Broadcasting Corporation)
- DRA – (i) Defence Research Agency (UK, 1991–1995) – Democratic Republic of America
- DRAGN – (a) Double Radio source Active Galactic Nucleus ("dragon")
- DRAM – (a) Dynamic Random Access Memory ("dee-ram") (computing)
- DRC – (i) Democratic Republic of the Congo -- Domaine Romanee Conti
- DRDC – (i) Defence Research & Development Canada
- DREA – (i/a) Defence Research Establishment Atlantic (obsolete 2002)
- DRES – (i/a) Defence Research Establishment Suffield (obsolete 2002)
- DRET – (i/a) Defence Research Establishment Toronto (obsolete 2002)
- DREV – (i/a) Defence Research Establishment Valcartier (obsolete 2002)
- DRI – (i) Detection, Recognition, Identification – Dietary Reference Intake
- DRIC – (i/a) (U.S.) Detroit River International Crossing
- DRL – (i) Daytime Running Lights – Dorman Roberts Ltd.
- DRM – (i) Digital Rights Management
- DRMS – (i) (U.S.) Defense Revitalization and Marketing Service
- DRPR – (p) Drawing Practices
- DRT – (i) Document Related Technologies

== DS ==
- Ds – (s) Darmstadtium
- DS
  - (i) Dear son (increasingly prevalent on social mailing lists, blogs, and bulletin boards)
  - Defence Scientist
  - Direct Support
  - (s) Dust Storm (METAR Code)
- DSA
  - (i) (U.S.) Defense Support Activities
  - Division Support Area
- DSAA
  - (i) (U.S.) Defense Security Assistance Agency
  - Driving Schools Association of the Americas
  - DECT Standard Authentication Algorithm
- DSAS – (i) Disney Sing Along Songs
- DSB – (i) (U.S.) Defense Science Board
- DSC
  - (i) Differential Scanning Calorimeter
  - Digital Selective Calling
  - Digital Still Camera
  - Distinguished Service Cross
  - Doctor of Surgical Chiropody (obsolete)
  - Document structure convention (PostScript programming)
  - Dynamic Stability Control
- DSCS – (i) U.S. Defense Satellite Communications System
- DSCSOC – (i) DSCS Operations Center
- DSD – (i) Defence Studies Department (King's College, London)
- DSDS – (i) Deutschland sucht den Superstar (German, "Germany Seeks the Superstar"), the German version of the Idol series
- DSE – (i) Dry Sheep Equivalent
- DSG – (i) Direct-Shift Gearbox
- DSID – (i) Dismounted Soldier Identification System
- DSL – (i) Digital Subscriber Line
- DSLR – (i) Digital single-lens reflex (camera)
- DSM – (i) Diagnostic and Statistical Manual of Mental Disorders
- DSN – (i) Deep Space Network
- DSO – (i) Distinguished Service Order (British military decoration)
- dsp – (i) decessit sine prole (Latin, "died without issue") – genealogy short-hand
  - dspl – (i) decessit sine prole legitima (Latin, "died without legitimate issue")
  - dspm – (i) decessit sine prole mascula [superstite] (Latin, "died without surviving male issue" )
  - dspml – (i) decessit sine prole mascula legitima (Latin, "died without legitimate male issue")
  - dspms – (i) decessit sine prole mascula superstite (Latin, "died without surviving male issue")
  - dsps – (i) Decessit sine prole superstite (Latin, "died without surviving issue")
- DSP
  - (i) Defense Standardization Program
  - Defense Support Program
  - Digital signal processing
- DSPL – (i) Design Specialists and Plans Language
- DSR – (i) Deformed Special Relativity
- DSRV
  - (i) Deaf Sports Recreation Victoria
  - Deep Submergence Rescue Vehicle
- DSS
  - (i) Digitized Sky Survey
  - Discarding-Sabot Shell (ammunition)
- DST – (i) Daylight saving time
- DSTL – (i) British Defence Science and Technology Laboratory
- dsvp – d.s.v.p. decessit sine vitae patria (Latin, "died within fathers lifetime")
- DSWA – (i) (U.S.) Defense Special Weapons Agency

== DT ==
- DTA – (i) Dental Technologists Association
- DTaP – (a/p) Diphtheria, tetanus, acellular pertussis (vaccine) (pronounced "D-tap")
- DTD – (i) Digital Terrain Data
- DTE – (i) Data Terminal Equipment – Down To Earth
- DTED – (p) Digital Terrain Elevation Data ("dee-ted")
- DTG – (i) Date-Time Group
- DTH – (i) Direct To Home (television)
- DTI – (i) UK Department of Trade and Industry
- DTIC – (i) (U.S.) Defense Technical Information Center
- DTL – (i) diode–transistor logic (electronics)
- DTM
  - (i) Deutsche Tourenwagen Masters (German, "German Touring Car Masters" – a current motor racing series)
  - Deutsche Tourenwagen Meisterschaft (German, "German Touring Car Championship" – a defunct motor racing series)
- DTMF – (i) Dual-tone multi-frequency signaling
- DTLOMS – (i) Doctrine, Training, Leader development, Organization, Materiel, and Soldier (mnemonic)
- DTO – (i) Disruptive Technology Office (was ARDA)
- DTOMLS – (i) Doctrine, Training, Organization, Materiel, Leader and Soldier development (mnemonic)
- DTP
  - (i) Desktop publishing
  - Desktop Tablet Press source
  - Diphtheria, tetanus, pertussis (vaccine)
- DTR – (i) Determine The Relationship
- DTRA – (i) Defense Threat Reduction Agency ("deet-ra")
- DTSA – (i) (U.S.) Defense Technology Security Administration (ii) – Defend Trade Secrets Act

== DU ==
- DU
  - (i) Depleted Uranium
  - (s) Dust (METAR Code)
- DUI
  - (i) Data Use Identifier
  - Data Use Institute
  - Davis Unified Ignition
  - Diving Unlimited International
  - Documento Único de Identidad
  - Documento Unico de Importación
  - Driving Under the Influence
  - Duke University Improv
- DUMBO – (a) Down Under the Manhattan Bridge Overpass (Brooklyn neighborhood)
- DUSD – (i) (U.S.) Deputy Under-Secretary of Defense

== DV ==
- dv – (s) Dhivehi language (ISO 639-1 code)
- DV
  - (i) Daily Value (FDA food guide)
  - Deo volente (Latin, "God willing")
- DVD – (i) Digital Versatile Disk (was Digital Video Disk)
- DVLC – (i) UK Driver and Vehicle Licensing Centre
- dvm – (i) decessit vita matris (Latin, "died in the lifetime of the mother")
- DVM – (i) Doctor of Veterinary Medicine
- DVO – (i) Direct View Optics
- DVOM – Digital Volt-Ohm Meter
- DVP – various meanings (disambiguation page)
  - dvp – (i) decessit vita patris (Latin, "died in the lifetime of the father")
- DVT
  - (i) Deep vein thrombosis
  - Design verification test
  - Driving Van Trailer (rail vehicle)
- dvu – (i) decessit vita uxoris (Latin, "died in the lifetime of spouse")

== DW ==
- DW – (a) Drum Workshop
- DWG – (p) Divisional Wargame (military simulation)
- DWI – (i) Dance With Intensity – Danish West Indies – Diffusion-weighted imaging – Direct water injection – Disaster Welfare Inquiry – Drinking Water Inspectorate – Driving While Intoxicated/Impaired
- DWM – (a) Doctor Who Magazine
- DWIM – (a) Do What I Mean
- DWTS – (a) Dancing with the Stars
- DWW – (a) Down with Webster

== DX ==
- DX
  - (s) Dexterity (role-playing games)
  - (p) DeXtrorphan
  - Distant (radio)
  - (i) D-Generation X (professional wrestling stable)
- DXA – (i) Dual-energy X-ray Absorptiometry
- DXM – (p) DeXtroMethorphan

== DY ==
- Dy – (s) Dysprosium
- DY – (s) Dahomey (ISO 3166 digram; obsolete since 1977)
- DYK or dyk - (i) Did you know?

== DZ ==
- dz – (s) Dzongkha language (ISO 639-1 code)
- DZ – (s) Algeria (ISO 3166 digram) – Drizzle (METAR Code) – (i) Drop Zone
- DZA – (s) Algeria (ISO 3166 trigram)
- DZD – (s) Algerian dinar (ISO 4217 currency code)
- dzo – (s) Dzongkha language (ISO 639-2 code)
- DZO (Depleted Zinc Oxide — physics/chemistry jargon)
