= DH =

DH, Dh, dh, or dH may refer to:

== Places ==
- DH postcode area, in the United Kingdom for the area of Durham and surrounding towns
- Diamond Head, Hawaii, a volcanic tuff cone on Oʻahu
- Dadra and Nagar Haveli and Daman and Diu, a union territory of India (ISO 3166-2)

== Websites ==
- DrugHub, a darknet market active since 2023.

== Organisations ==
- D+H, a Canadian financial services company
- Department of Health (United Kingdom), a department of the UK government
- DH Press, the Dark Horse Comics imprint that publishes novels
- Deccan Herald, an Indian newspaper
- Dundonald House, a governmental building in Northern Ireland

== Science and technology ==
- Denavit–Hartenberg parameters, a type of robotics convention
- Dermatitis herpetiformis, a skin disease
- DH register, the high byte of a DX register in x86-compatible microprocessors
- Diffie-Hellman key exchange (D-H), a specific method of securely exchanging cryptographic keys over a public channel
- District heating, a method of heating multiple buildings from a central location
- Doubled haploidy, a genetic status
- Deuterium:protium (D:H), a ratio in deuterium-depleted water
- °dH, deutsche Härte, a unit of water hardness
- decihenry (dH), 10^{-1} of a henry (unit of electrical inductance)
- Dorsal horn of the spinal cord, or posterior grey column

== Sports ==
- Designated hitter, a baseball rule
- Doubleheader (baseball)
- Doubleheader (television)
- Downhill (ski competition), a skiing discipline
- Downhill mountain biking, a bicycling discipline

== Transportation ==
- de Havilland, a former UK aircraft manufacturer
- Decision height, in aviation
- Delaware and Hudson Railway (reporting mark DH)
- Independence Air (IATA code)
- Timor (vehicle registration prefix DH)

== Other uses ==
- Dh (digraph), in linguistics
- Dear husband, a shorthand phrase common in online forums
- Donor husband
- Digital humanities, a community of practice combining technology with humanistic inquiry
- Documentary hypothesis or Wellhausen hypothesis, describing the origins of Judeo-Christian scripture
- Desperate Housewives, television series
- Domestic Helper
- Informal abbreviation for Harry Potter and the Deathly Hallows

== See also ==
- Degrees of general hardness (dGH), a unit of water hardness
- Dirham, a unit of currency in several Arab states
  - Moroccan Dirham abbreviated as Dh
  - United Arab Emirates dirham, unofficially abbreviated DH
