= UDS =

UDS may refer to:

- Ubuntu Developer Summit, for Ubuntu Linux
- Ultra Deep Survey, deepest near-infrared astronomical survey
- Unified Diagnostic Services, a vehicle communication standard used for vehicle diagnostics
- Union Deportiva Salamanca, a Spanish football team
- Unique Development Studios, a video and computer game developer based in Sweden
- United Drapery Stores, former UK retail group
- Unix domain socket, data communications endpoint
- Université de Sherbrooke (UdS) Sherbrooke University
- University of Strasbourg (French: Université de Strasbourg, Unistra or UDS)
- Uranus Dark Spot
- Urban Dance Squad, former Dutch rap rock band
- University for Development Studies, a university in Ghana

== See also ==
- UD (disambiguation) for the singular of "UDs"
- DS (disambiguation) for micro-DS (uDS / μDS)
- D (disambiguation) for micro-D's (uD's / μDs)
