= DSC =

DSC or Dsc may refer to:

== Education ==
- Doctor of Science (D.Sc.)
- District Selection Committee, an entrance exam in India
- Doctor of Surgical Chiropody, superseded in the 1960s by Doctor of Podiatric Medicine

=== Educational institutions ===
- Dyal Singh College, Delhi, India
- DSC International School, Hong Kong, China

==== United States ====
- Dalton State College, Georgia
- Daytona State College, Florida
- Deep Springs College, California
- Dixie State College, now Utah Tech University, Utah

== Science and technology ==
- Dice similarity coefficient, a statistical measure
- Differential scanning calorimetry, or the differential scanning calorimeter
- Digital setting circles, on telescopes
- Digital still camera, a type of camera
- Doppler shift compensation, in bat echolocation
- Dye-sensitized solar cell, a low-cost solar cell
- Dynamic stability control, computerized technology that improves a vehicle's stability
- Dynamic susceptibility contrast, a technique in perfusion MRI
- Subarctic climate (Köppen climate classification: Dsc)

=== Computing and telecommunications ===
- DECT Standard Cipher, an encryption algorithm used by wireless telephone systems
- Digital selective calling, in marine telecommunications
- Digital signal controller, a hybrid microcontroller and digital signal processor
- Display Stream Compression, a VESA-developed video compression algorithm
- Distributed source coding, in information theory and communication
- Document Structuring Conventions, a PostScript standard
- Desired State Configuration, a feature of Windows PowerShell

== Government and military ==
- Defence Security Corps, of the Indian Army
- Defense Security Command, of the Republic of Korea Armed Forces
- Distinguished Service Cross (Australia), an Australian military award
- Distinguished Service Cross (United Kingdom), a British naval award
- Distinguished Service Cross (United States), an American military award
- Correctional Services Bureau, Portuguese abbreviation of Direcção dos Serviços Correccionais, a Macau government agency
- United States District Court for the District of South Carolina

== Media and entertainment ==
- Daily Source Code, a podcast by Adam Curry
- Dallas Symphony Chorus, an American choir
- Dave, Shelly, and Chainsaw, a morning radio show in the San Diego, California, US
- DeepSouthCon, a science fiction convention in the southern US
- Dutch Swing College Band, a Dutch jazz ensemble
- Star Trek: Discovery, an American science fiction television series

== Sport ==
- Delbrücker SC, a German association football club from Delbrück, North Rhine-Westphalia
- Deep South Conference, a defunct NCAA athletic conference
- Dresdner SC, a German multisport club from Dresden, Saxony
- Dubai Sports City, a multi-venue sports complex in Dubai, United Arab Emirates
- U.S. Postal Service Pro Cycling Team, an American professional road bicycle racing team
- Dangerous Sports Club, a former group of extreme sports pioneers based in England

== Other uses ==
- Directory of Social Change, a British charity
- Down Syndrome Centre, a registered charity in Ireland
- Dschang Airport (IATA code), in Cameroon
- Dollar Shave Club, an American company
