= DUI (disambiguation) =

A DUI, in vehicular crime, is a charge of driving under the influence of alcohol or drugs.

DUI or Dui may also refer to:

== Arts and entertainment ==
- D.U.I. (TV series), an American reality television series (2011–2012)
- "DUI", a song by Ciara from her 2013 album Ciara
- "D.U.I.", a 1997 punk song by The Offspring from Club Me

== Government, military and politics ==
- Democratic Union for Integration, a Macedonian political party
- Distinctive unit insignia, of the US Army
- Documento Único de Identidad, the national identity document of El Salvador

== Other uses ==
- Dui (vessel), a type of bronze vessel from ancient China
- Diving Unlimited International, a US diving equipment company
- Melvil Dui or Melvil Dewey (1851–1931), American librarian
- Doctor of both laws (Latin: doctor iuris utriusque), an academic degree recognizing studies in civil and church law
