= Directional symmetry =

Directional symmetry may refer to:

- Isotropy
- Directional statistics
- Directional symmetry (time series)
