= C5H14N2 =

The molecular formula C_{5}H_{14}N_{2} (molar mass: 102.17 g/mol, exact mass: 102.1157 u) may refer to:

- Cadaverine
- Dimethylaminopropylamine (DMAPA)
- N,N′-Dimethyl-1,3-propanediamine (DMPA)
