= DMPA =

DMPA can refer to:

- Depot medroxyprogesterone acetate, a birth control medication marketed under the brand name Depo-Provera
- 2,2-Dimethoxy-2-phenylacetophenone, a radical initiator
- N,N′-Dimethyl-1,3-propanediamine, a cross linking reagent
- Dimethylol propionic acid
- Des Moines Performing Arts, the organization that operates the Civic Center of Greater Des Moines
- Zytron, chemical name N-[(2,4-dichlorophenoxy)methoxyphosphinothioyl]propan-2-amine), an herbicide
