= Double bass (disambiguation) =

A double bass is a string instrument.

Double bass may also refer to:

== Musical instruments ==
- Electric double bass
- Double-bass drum

== Other uses ==
- Double bass array, a layout of loudspeakers
- Double Bass (album), a 1976 album by Niels-Henning Ørsted Pedersen and Sam Jones
- Der Kontrabaß, a 1981 play by Patrick Süskind translated to English as The Double Bass
- "Double Bass", a song from the 2001 Gorillaz self titled album

== See also ==
- Contrabass
