= DVP =

DVP may refer to:

- decessit vita patris, "died in the lifetime of his father", term used by genealogists to denote a child who pre-deceased his or her father and did not live long enough to inherit the father's title or estate
- Delivery versus payment, a common form of settlement for securities
- Deutsche Volkspartei (German People's Party), a political party in the German Weimar Republic
  - Several other parties named German People's Party (disambiguation)
- Deutsche Volkspolizei, the national police force of East Germany
- Disability Visibility Project, an American disability organization
- Don Valley Parkway, a municipal expressway in Toronto
- Dover Priory railway station, in the United Kingdom (Network Rail station code)
- Democrats and Veterans, a political party in the United Kingdom
- DVP (song), a 2016 song by Canadian punk rock band PUP
- NASCAR's Damaged Vehicle Policy

== See also ==
- Non-DVP, a form of securities settlement
