= DBA =

DBA or dba may refer to:

== Academic ==
- Doctor of Business Administration, a research-based doctorate degree

== Science and technology ==
=== Biology and medicine ===
- Diamond–Blackfan anemia, a congenital medical condition
- Dilute, Brown and non-Agouti, a strain of laboratory mice developed by C. C. Little

=== Computing and telecommunication ===
- DarkBASIC (.dba format), a computer language and associated programming environment designed to simplify the creation of 3D video games
- Database administration, a technical function concerned with the effective use and control of a particular database and of its related applications
  - Database administrator, a person responsible for the environmental aspects of a database
- Dynamic bandwidth allocation, a telecommunications algorithm

=== Other uses in science and technology ===
- Bolkhovitinov DB-A, a 1930s Soviet heavy bomber
- dB(A) or dBA, a sound level unit in which different frequencies are weighted differently to account for the perception of the human ear
- Design basis accident, scenario in nuclear facilities
- Dibenzylideneacetone, an organic compound used as a sunscreen
- Double Bass Array, active absorption approach for low frequency sound reproduction
- Double bend achromat lattice, a magnetic lattice more commonly known as Chasman–Green lattice

== Other uses ==
- De Bellis Antiquitatis, a tabletop wargame
- Dalbandin Airport IATA code
- Dallas Bar Association, a professional organization for lawyers in Dallas, Texas, U.S.
- DBA (airline), a former low-cost German airline
- Defense Base Act, type of insurance that covers employees at U.S. defense bases overseas
- Doing business as, a legal term related to the name a business uses
- The Barge Association, formerly "Dutch Barge Association" (DBA): a club for leisure users of European inland waterways
- Daredevil: Born Again, a 2025 television series produced by Marvel Studios
