= DASL =

DASL may mean:

- Datapoint's Advanced Systems Language
- Distributed Application Specification Language, developed by Sun Microsystems
- DAV Searching and Locating, a WebDAV project
- Director of American Sign Language
