= D&B (disambiguation) =

D&B (Dun & Bradstreet) is an American business services company, formerly listed at the New York Stock Exchange.

D&B may also refer to:

- d&b audiotechnik, a manufacturer of audio equipment
- Dandelion and burdock, a drink
- Dave & Buster's, a restaurant and entertainment business
- Dodging and burning, a technique used during the printing process
- Drum and bass, a musical genre

== See also ==
- Dab (disambiguation)
- DB (disambiguation)
