= DVT (disambiguation) =

DVT most often refers to deep vein thrombosis, a type of venous thrombosis involving the formation of a blood clot in a deep vein, most commonly in the legs or pelvis.

DVT may also refer to:

- D. Vt., a short form for the United States District Court for the District of Vermont
- Design verification test, for quality control in engineering
- Driving Van Trailer, a railway vehicle
- DVT, IATA code for Phoenix Deer Valley Airport, Arizona, US
