= DTA =

DTA may refer to:

- 9,10-Dithioanthracene
- DTA Records, an American record label founded by Travis Barker
- Death to America
- Deferred tax assets, an accounting concept
- Democratic Turnhalle Alliance, a political party in Namibia
- Descending thoracic aorta
- Detainee Treatment Act of 2005
- Detroit Arsenal (DTA), formerly Detroit Arsenal Tank Plant (DATP)
- Development trust association
- Differential thermal analysis
- Digital television adapter, a digital-to-analog converter
- Digital Transgender Archive
- Digital transport adapter
- Divisão de Transportes Aéreos, the former name of TAAG Angola Airlines
- Docosatetraenoic acid
- Domestic Tariff Area
- Don't Trust Anybody, one of the catchphrases of former professional wrestler Stone Cold Steve Austin.
- Double Tax Agreement, another name for a Tax treaty
- DownThemAll!, a download manager/accelerator extension for Mozilla Firefox
- Downtown Annapolis, Maryland
- Duluth Transit Authority
- .dta, a file format used by:
  - Stata, a statistics application
  - sequest, a tandem mass spectrometry data analysis program used for protein identification
- D-threonine aldolase, an enzyme
- DTA sarl, a French ultralight aircraft manufacturer
