= DCW =

DCW may refer to:

- Digital Chart of the World, a comprehensive digital map of Earth
- David Cronenberg's Wife, a London-based band
- Delhi Commission for Women
- WDCW, a Washington, DC, television station branded as DCW Television
- Dorchester West railway station, station code
- DCW Software, a German software company founded by Claus Wellenreuther, later acquired by SAP
- Dhrangadhra Chemical Works, an Indian company founded by Shreyans Prasad Jain, now known as DCW
