= DRM =

DRM may refer to:

== Government, military and politics ==
- Defense reform movement, U.S. campaign inspired by Col. John Boyd
- Democratic Republic of Madagascar, a former socialist state (1975–1992) on Madagascar
- Direction du renseignement militaire, the French Directorate of Military Intelligence
- Disability rights movement
- Disaster risk management

== Science and technology ==
=== Information technology ===
- Digital rights management, access control technologies that limit the usage of digital content and devices
  - "Digital restrictions management", a re-purposing of the acronym by the Defective by Design movement
- Data Reference Model, one of the five reference models of the Federal Enterprise Architecture
- Digital Radio Mondiale, a set of digital audio broadcasting technologies
- Direct Rendering Manager, a component of Linux's Direct Rendering Infrastructure
- Distributed resource manager or job scheduler, a software application that is in charge of unattended background executions

=== Biology and psychology ===
- Deese–Roediger–McDermott paradigm, a paradigm in cognitive psychology for investigating false memories
- Desmin related myopathy, a subgroup of the myofibrillar myopathy diseases
- Detergent resistant membrane, a lipid raft
- Digestive rate model, the diet selection that animals should perform to maximize energy or nutrients
- Gremlin (protein) or Drm, an inhibitor in the TGF beta signaling pathway

=== Other uses in science and technology ===
- Detrital remanent magnetization, the residual magnetization in sediments
- Diamond and Related Materials, a journal in materials science

== Sports ==
- Deutsche Rallye Meisterschaft, a German motor rally series
- Deutsche Rennsport Meisterschaft, a 1970s German auto racing series
- Diamond Ridge Motorsports, a former NASCAR team

== Other uses ==
- Danbury Railway Museum, Connecticut, US
- DRM (Japanese band), a J-pop girl group
- Dispute resolution mechanism, an acronym applicable to dispute resolution (e.g., in diplomatic or contractual matters)
- Di Ravello Militia, the main antagonist faction in Just Cause 3
- Die Rolling Machine, a name of a dice-rolling machine in the Filipino game show Rainbow Rumble
