= DrugHub =

Darknet market since 2023

- Logo
- Website type: Darknet market
- Available in: English
- Website: drughub666py6fgnml5kmxa7fva5noppkf6wkai4fwwvzwt4rz645aqd.onion ^{(Accessing link help)}
- Commercial: Yes
- Registration: Optional
- Users: 12,818 listings (January 2026) (according to the UNSW)
- Launched: August 2023
- Current status: Active

DrugHub, is a darknet market created by the team behind White House Market in August 2023. As of June 2026, it remains operational and is among the most widely used markets. Similarly to White House Market, it has a strong focus on privacy features, with Monero as the only payment option and PGP encryption enforced.

== History ==
The team behind White House Market opened a new darknet market, DrugHub, in August 2023.

listings of JoyInc

in 2025, the DrugHub vendor JoyInc was arrested by the FBI.

== See also ==
- White House Market
- dread (forum)
- Archetyp Market
