= DUSD =

DUSD may refer to:

== School districts ==
=== California ===
- Dublin Unified School District
- Dysart Unified School District
- Downey Unified School District
- Duarte Unified School District
- Dixon Unified School District
- Delhi Unified School District
- Denair Unified School District
