= DDN =

DDN may refer to:

== Arts, media and entertainment ==
- Daydream Nation, a music album by Sonic Youth
- Dayton Daily News, a daily newspaper in Dayton, Ohio, US
- Digital Delivery Network, a service of the Community Radio Network in Australia
- Digital Distribution Netherlands, a Dutch digital music distributor
- Double Down News, an alternative media outlet in the UK
- Dustin's Daily News, a comedic current affairs TV show

== Computing ==
- DataDirect Networks, a data storage company
- Defense Data Network, a separate instantiation of the ARPANET used by the U.S. Department of Defense from 1983 to 1995
- Dot-decimal notation, a human readable way to write IPv4 internet addresses

== Other uses ==
- Dehradun railway station (station code), India
- Digital Divide Network, an online community of activists
