= Do not resuscitate (disambiguation) =

Do not resuscitate is a medical order indicating that a person should not receive cardiopulmonary resuscitation if that person's heart stops beating.

Do not resuscitate may also refer to:

- "Do Not Resuscitate" (The Sopranos), episode of TV series
- "Do Not Resuscitate", episode of Batwoman season 2
- "Do Not Resuscitate", episode of Chicago Fire season 14
- "D.N.R. (Do Not Resuscitate)", song on The Gathering (Testament album)

== See also ==
- DNR
- Do Not Reboot
