= TÜV Nord =

Technical service provider

TÜV Nord Group

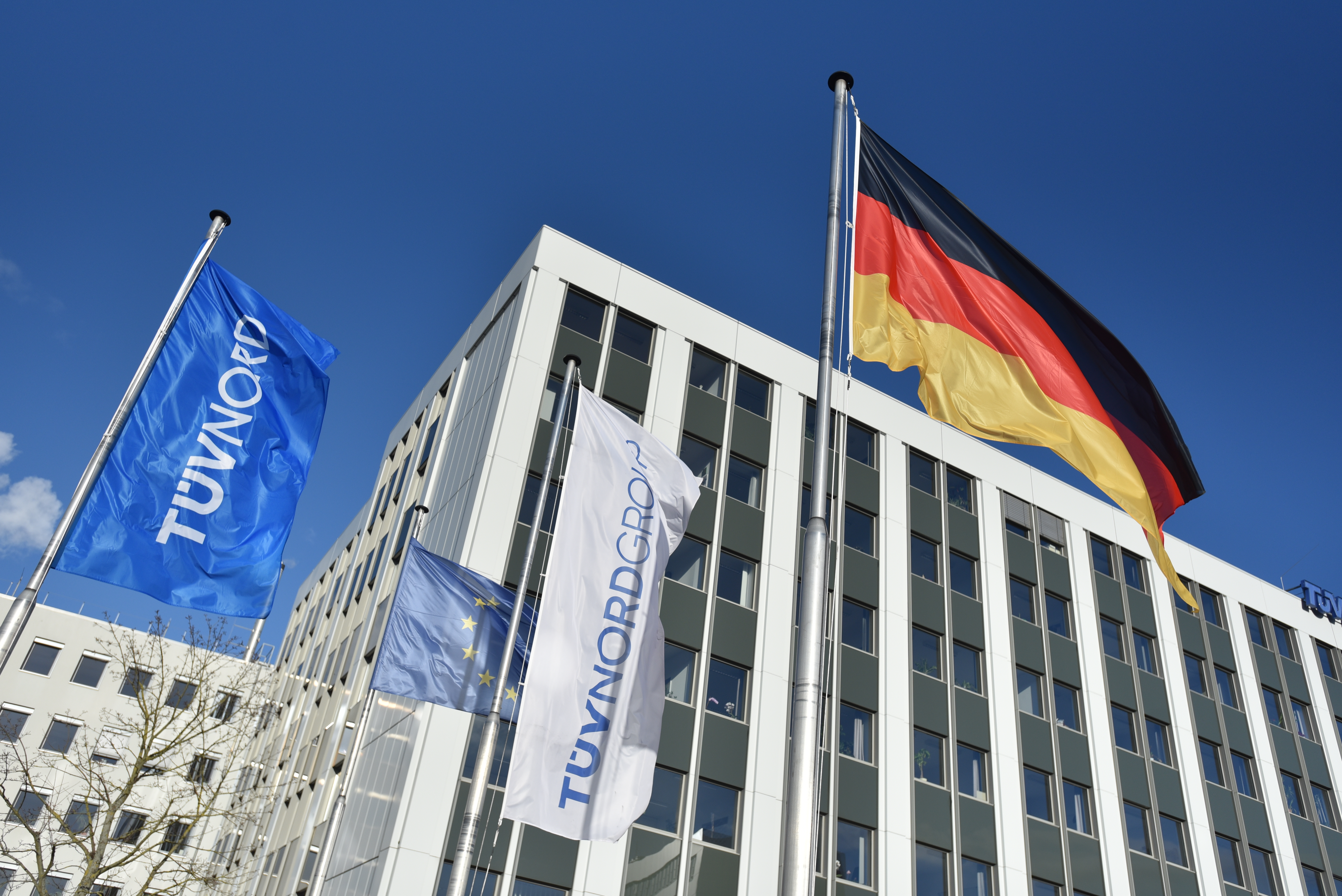
- TÜV Nord main entrance, Hanover, Germany
- Company type: Limited company ('Aktiengesellschaft')
- Industry: technical services certification services inspection services testing services product safety
- Founded: 1869
- Headquarters: Hanover, Germany
- Key people: Dr Dirk Stenkamp (Chairman of the Board of Management), Jürgen Himmelsbach (Finance), Inga Dransfeld-Haase (Human Resources), Ringo Schmelzer (COO)
- Revenue: 1,369,300,000 euro (2021)
- Number of employees: 11,658 (2020)
- Website: www.tuv-nord.com

TÜV Nord Group is a technical service provider with worldwide activities. Founded in 1869 and headquartered in Hanover, Germany, the Group employs more than 15,000 people in more than 100 countries of Europe, Asia, America and Africa. The Group is divided into the following operative brands and business units:

- TÜV Nord: Industrial Services, Mobility, Training, IT
- DMT: Engineering and Natural Resources
- Alter Technology and HTV Group: Aerospace, Semiconductor and Electronics

TÜVs (German abbreviation: Technischer Überwachungsverein, English: Technical Inspection Association) are German organizations that work to validate the safety of products and services of all kinds to protect humans, material assets and the environment against hazards.

== History ==
The story of TÜV Nord Group has its roots in the traditional boiler inspection associations founded by the industry, which in 1869 voluntarily undertook to begin monitoring and ensuring the operational safety of boilers. Gradually, the government gave the DÜV, later known as the TÜV (Technical Inspection Association) additional safety-related tasks, such as the regular inspection of automobiles, still a watchword for road safety in Germany today.

== Recently acquired companies ==
- 2007: DMT GmbH & Co. KG (Germany), Verebus Engineering BV (Netherlands)
- 2010: RAG Bildung GmbH
- 2011: Alter Technology Group (Spain)
- 2023: HTV and HTV Conservation (Germany)
