= DNM =

DNM may refer to:

- Defence Nuclear Material
- Det Norske Misjonsforbund, the Mission Covenant Church of Norway
- Denham railway station, England
- Darknet market
- United States District Court for the District of New Mexico
- De novo mutation, one of the classifications of mutations in biology
