= DIF =

DIF may refer to:

== Computing ==
- Data Integrity Field, to protect data from corruption
- Data Interchange Format
- Digital Interface Format of DV video

== Other uses ==
- DIF a bank deposit insurance fund in the Commonwealth of Massachusetts, U.S.A. The Massachusetts DIF is similar to the U.S. government's Federal Deposit Insurance Corporation (FDIC)
- Dif, a settlement in Kenya
- DIF (Mexibús), a BRT station in Ecatepec de Morelos, Mexico
- DIF (technique) for controlling plant height
- National Olympic Committee and Sports Confederation of Denmark (Danmarks Idræts-Forbund)
- Desarrollo Integral de la Familia (Integral Family Development), Mexico
- Differential item functioning, a statistical procedure
- Differentiation-inducing factor
- Djurgårdens IF, a sports club in Sweden
- Dublin Irish Festival, an annual cultural festival held in Dublin, Ohio, USA
