= DMT (disambiguation) =

DMT is dimethyltryptamine, a naturally occurring psychedelic drug.

DMT may also refer to:

== Chemical substances ==
- Desoxymethyltestosterone, a designer anabolic steroid
- Dimethyl terephthalate, a polyester precursor
- DMT1, a transporter involved in human iron metabolism
- Dimethylglycine N-methyltransferase, an enzyme
- DMTMM (4-(4,6-dimethoxy-1,3,5-triazin-2-yl)-4-methyl-morpholinium chloride) an amide-coupling reagent
- Dimethoxytrityl, a protecting group used in oligonucleotide synthesis

== Other uses in science and technology ==
- Deadman timer
- Disease-modifying therapy, a class of treatments for progressive diseases
- Discrete multitone modulation, a form of orthogonal frequency-division multiplexing (OFDM)
- Definite Minimum Time, a term specific to protective relays
- UTC−00:25 (Dublin Mean Time), which was 25 minutes behind Greenwich Mean Time 1880–1916
- Digital Material Traceability (devices)
- Discrete Monitor Timings, a set of pre-defined VESA timings for computer displays.

== Other uses ==
- Danville Mass Transit, a bus service in Danville, Illinois
- Diving medical technician, a certification offered in the United States by the NBDHMT
- Dʿmt, a historical kingdom in what is now Eritrea and northern Ethiopia
- Dignified Mobile Toilets, a Nigerian mobile toilet company
- Double mini trampoline, a discipline of gymnastics
- DMT (company), German engineering company
