= DRL =

DRL or drl may refer to:

== Science and technology ==
- Daytime running lamp, vehicle lights
- Diode-resistor logic, AND and OR logic with diodes and resistors
- Driven right leg circuit, an electric circuit added to biological signal amplifiers
- Differential reinforcement of low response rate; see reinforcement

== Sport ==
- Deutscher Reichsbund für Leibesübungen, a Nazi German sports governing body
- Drone Racing League, an air sports league

== Transportation ==
- Derol railway station, Gujarat, India
- Downtown Relief Line, a former proposed subway line in Toronto, Canada
- DRL Coachlines, a Canadian bus company

== Other uses ==
- DRL (video game), a 2013 video game formerly known as "Doom, the Roguelike".
- Bureau of Democracy, Human Rights, and Labor, of the United States Department of State
- David Rittenhouse Laboratory, of the University of Pennsylvania
- Defence Research Laboratory, of the Indian Defence Research and Development Organisation
- Dominion Rules Licence, a free content licence
- DRL Supply Co., a general store in Morrisonville, Illinois, United States
- Baagandji language, an ISO 639-3 code
