= DRI =

DRI or D.R.I. may stand for:

== Businesses and organisations ==
- Darden Restaurants, NYSE stock symbol DRI
- Data Resources Inc, a former distributor of economic data
- Desert Research Institute, in Nevada, United States
- Diamond Resorts International, a former vacation ownership company
- Digital Research Inc, a former American software company
- Directorate of Revenue Intelligence, in India
- Doncaster Royal Infirmary, a hospital in England
- Dundee Royal Infirmary, a former hospital in Scotland
- United States District Court for the District of Rhode Island

== Science and technology ==
- Declarative referential integrity, in databases
- Direct Rendering Infrastructure, a software interface
- Dietary Reference Intake, a system of nutrition recommendations
- Dopamine reuptake inhibitor, a class of drug

== Other uses ==
- Direct reduced iron, used in steel production
- Dirty Rotten Imbeciles, an American band
- Directly Responsible Individual, a job role in Apple Inc

== See also ==
- Dr.I (disambiguation)
