= DASD (disambiguation) =

DASD may refer to:

- Direct-access storage device, a computer storage device

== Education ==
- DeForest Area School District
- Downingtown Area School District
- DuBois Area School District
