= DTSA =

DTSA may refer to:

- Defense Technology Security Administration
- Defend Trade Secrets Act, a United States federal law relating to trade secrets
