= DWI (disambiguation) =

A DWI, in vehicular crime, is a charge of driving whilst intoxicated (by alcohol) or impaired (by drugs).

Dwi or DWI may also refer to:

- Dwi-, a prefix once used for undiscovered chemical elements
- Dwi Putri Bonita (born 1997), Indonesian singer and former member of the idol group JKT48
- Diffusion-weighted imaging, in magnetic resonance imaging
- Drinking Water Inspectorate, England and Wales
- ICAO designator for Arajet, flag carrier of the Dominican Republic
