= DZ =

DZ, Dz, or dz may refer to:

== Businesses and organizations ==
- DarkZero Esports, an American esports organization
- Delftsche Zwervers, a Dutch student society and rover crew
- Delta Zeta, a college sorority in the USA
- Discovery Zone, an American children's entertainment business from 1989 to 2001 and currently since 2020.
- Donghai Airlines, the IATA code for this airline.

== In language ==
- Dz (digraph), used in Polish, Kashubian, Macedonian, Slovak, Esperanto, Hungarian, Dene Suline (Chipewyan) and the ILE romanization of Cantonese
- Dzongkha (ISO 639 alpha-2 code)
- Voiced alveolar sibilant affricate [d͡z] or [d͜z], as in the English word "adze"

== People ==
- John Drewienkiewicz, British soldier
- Dolph Ziggler, American professional wrestler

== In science and technology ==
- dz, in calculus, notation for the differential of a variable z
- DZ, METAR code for drizzle

== Other uses ==
- Algeria (ISO 3166-1 country code)
  - .dz, Algeria's internet country code top-level domain (ccTLD)
- Demilitarized zone, a buffer zone between military powers
- Drop zone, as in a parachuting drop zone
- contraction for dozen
- Daşoguz (vehicle registration suffix DZ)
