= Drea (disambiguation) =

Drea is a town and commune in Souk Ahras Province in north-eastern Algeria.

Drea may also refer to:

- Christine Drea (active from 1984), Morocco-born American biologist and ecologist
- Drea de Matteo (born 1972), American actress
- Drea Kelly (born 1974), American actress also known as Andrea Kelly
- Edward J. Drea (born 1944), American military historian
- Seán Drea (born 1947), Irish former rower
- William Drea Adams (active from 1972), American educator and advocate for the humanities

== See also ==
- Moby Drea, a cruiseferry launched 1975
