= DWM =

DWM may refer to:

== Computing ==
- dwm, a window manager for X11
- Desktop Window Manager in Microsoft Windows
- Domain-wall memory, experimental computer memory

== Organisations ==
- Deutsche Waffen und Munitionsfabriken, a munitions company, Karlsruhe, Germany
- Deutsche Waggon und Maschinenfabrik, a German rail and bus manufacturer

== Other uses ==
- Dandy–Walker malformation, a congenital malformation of the brain
- Distinguished Warfare Medal, a cancelled US award
- Doctor Who Magazine
