= DLI =

DLI may refer to:

- Daily light integral, the number of photons received in an area
- Defense Language Institute of the US DoD
- Delhi Junction railway station (station code DLI)
- Durham Light Infantry, UK
- Donor lymphocyte infusion, immunotherapy
- Delay line interferometer
- Digital Library of India
- Department of Land Information, Western Australia
- Data Language Interface (DL/I) to IBM's IMS databases
- 551 in Roman numerals
- Lien Khuong Airport IATA code
- Dysfunctional Lens Index a measure for cataract diagnosis
