= Denair Unified School District =

School district in California

Address
- 3460 Lester Road Denair, California, 95316; United States

District information
- Type: Public
- Grades: K–12
- NCES District ID: 0611040

Students and staff
- Students: 1,318 (2020–2021)
- Teachers: 75.88 (FTE)
- Staff: 87.28 (FTE)
- Student–teacher ratio: 17.37:1

Other information
- Website: www.dusd.k12.ca.us

Denair Unified School District is a school district based in Stanislaus County, California, United States.
