= DEU =

DEU may refer to:

- Deutsche Eislauf-Union, the figure skating governing body in Germany
- Diccionario del español del Uruguay, the Dictionary of Uruguayan Spanish
- Distinctive environmental uniform, the current uniform of the Canadian Forces, adopted in the late 1980s
- Doom Editing Utility, a software utility for the computer game Doom
- The ISO 3166-1 alpha-3 country code for Germany (German Deutschland)
- The ISO 639-2 (T) and ISO 639-3 code for Standard German
- Drug Enforcement Unit, a specialised police unit
- Dokuz Eylül University, a state university located in Izmir, Turkey
