= Diamond and Related Materials =

- Discipline: Materials science
- Language: English
- Edited by: Ken Haenen

Publication details
- History: 1991-present
- Publisher: Elsevier
- Frequency: 10/year
- Impact factor: 5.2 (2025)

Standard abbreviations
- ISO 4: Diam. Relat. Mater.

Indexing
- CODEN: DRMTE3
- ISSN: 0925-9635
- LCCN: sn93033809
- OCLC no.: 905470023

Links
- Journal homepage; Online archive

Diamond and Related Materials is a peer-reviewed scientific journal in materials science covering research on all forms of diamond and other related materials, including diamond-like carbons, carbon nanotubes, graphene, and boron and carbon nitrides. The journal is published by Elsevier and the editor-in-chief is Ken Haenen (University of Hasselt).

== Abstracting and indexing ==
The journal is abstracted and indexing in:

- CSA databases
- Chemical Abstracts Service
- Current Contents/Physical, Chemical & Earth Sciences
- Current Contents/Engineering, Computing & Technology
- Inspec
- Materials Science Citation Index
- PASCAL
- Science Citation Index
- Scopus

According to the Journal Citation Reports, the journal has a 2025 impact factor of 5.2.
