= Digital compass =

Digital compass may refer to:

- Digital magnetic compass, solid-state microelectromechanical system compasses
- Fibre optic gyrocompass, as in a ship's navigation system
- Magnetometer, such as a MEMS magnetometer in hand-held devices
