= DGZ =

DGZ may refer to:

- Die Goldenen Zitronen, a German music band
- Demigodz, an American Hip Hop group formed by Rapper Apathy
- "dgz", the Daga language ISO 639-3 code
