= Down Syndrome Centre =

Irish charity

Down Syndrome Centre (DSC) is a registered charity in Ireland. It was set up in 2002 by parents of children with Down syndrome. The aim of the charity is to establish support centres in Ireland which provide a range of support services.

In 2017, the charity opened a centre in Cork (DSC Cork), and also provides support to facilities in Portlaoise (DSC Midlands) and in Carrickmacross (DSC North East).

Other initiatives include the development of a website with news and information relating to Down syndrome. The charity, working in conjunction with the National Children's Hospital in Tallaght, recruited Ireland's first Down syndrome liaison nurse in 2009 - to provide information to parents of newly born children with Down syndrome in Dublin's maternity hospitals.

The charity holds a number of fundraising events during the year, which includes golf classics, a "Strawberry Ball", "Laughternoon", a Christmas lunch and a "Buy My Dress" program – a sale of over 1000 used high street and designer dresses that have been donated by Irish people.
