= DJS =

DJS or DJs may refer to:

- Department of Juvenile Services, a state agency of Maryland
- Director of the Joint Staff, a position in the United States Department of Defense
- D'Jais, D'Jais (pronounced DJ's) Bar & Grill is a popular dance club and restaurant in Belmar, New Jersey, USA
- Doctor of Juridical Science, a research doctorate in law
- Dubai Japanese School
- Good Morning Serbia, electoral alliance in Serbia
- DJs, plural of disc jockeys
- David Jones (department store), an Australian department store chain
