= DTD =

DTD may refer to:

== Arts and entertainment ==
- Desktop Tower Defense, a Flash-based strategy game
- DTD (TV station), a digital television station in Darwin, Northern Territory, Australia
- December to Dismember, a former wrestling pay-per-view event
- Dust-to-Digital, a record label specializing in American folk music

== Science and technology ==
- Data transfer device, as found in AN/CYZ-10, a cryptographic device for receiving, storing, and transferring keys
- Detailed timing descriptor, a block containing supported output resolution details in Extended Display Identification Data
- Document type definition, used in markup languages such as XML
- Direct-to-disk recording, recording of audio or video to random access digital media as opposed to tape

=== Medicine ===
- Developmental topographical disorientation, a cognitive disorder marked by inability to navigate within the environment
- Diastrophic dysplasia, an autosomal recessive dysplasia which affects cartilage and bone development
- Developmental trauma disorder, a childhood equivalent of complex post-traumatic stress disorder

== Other uses ==
- Danube–Tisa–Danube Canal, a water system in Serbia
- Dekoratie voor Trouwe Dienst, a military decoration of the South African Defence Force between 1921 and 1946
- Delta Tau Delta, a U.S.-based college fraternity

== See also ==
- Dopamine transporter deficiency syndrome (DTDS), an autosomal recessive Parkinsonism dystonia
