= DBM =

DBM or dbm may refer to:

== Science and technology ==
- dBm, a unit for power measurement
- DBM (computing), family of key-value database engines including dbm, ndbm, gdbm, and Berkeley DB
- Database Manager (DBM), a component of 1987's Extended Edition v1.0 release of IBM's OS/2 operating system
- Dibenzoylmethane, an aromatic diketone: 1,3-diphenylpropane-1,3-dione
- Dibromomescaline, a psychedelic drug
- Dibromomethane, a halomethane
- Difference bound matrix, a data structure used in a field of computer science
- Dibutyl maleate, an organic chemical compound

== Other uses ==
- Debre Marqos Airport, IATA airport code is DBM
- D. B. M. Patnaik (1925–2009), Indian lawyer, politician and communist leader
- De Bellis Multitudinis, a wargame ruleset
- Department of Budget and Management, the executive department in the Philippines
- Development Bank of Mongolia, bank of Mongolia
- D-flat minor, a theoretical musical key
- Dynamic Business Modeling, the ability to automate business models within an open framework
