= DJD =

DJD or djd may refer to:

- Discoveries in the Judaean Desert, a collection of ancient texts
- Degenerative Joint Disease, an alternative term for osteoarthritis
- djd, the ISO-639 code for the Jaminjung language of Australia
- The Decepticon Justice Division, a fictional group from the comic series Transformers: More Than Meets the Eye.
