= DSG =

DSG may stand for:

== Companies and organisations ==
- Caldera Digital Research Systems Group, a former department of Caldera
- Defence Support Group, the Trading Fund of the UK Ministry of Defence
- Delaware State Guard, the inactive state defense force of Delaware
- Democratic Study Group, a legislative service organization (LSO) in the United States House of Representatives
- Deutsche Schlafwagen- und Speisewagengesellschaft, the German Sleeper and Dining Car Company
- Dick's Sporting Goods, a sporting goods retailer
- DSG International (retailer), Dixons Stores Group, a European retailer
- DSG International Ltd., a Hong Kong–based manufacturer
- Novell Desktop Systems Group, a former department of Novell
- Disguised, an esports organization founded by streamer Disguised Toast

== Health ==
- Dacryoscintigraphy, a nuclear medicine scan of the lacrimal system
- Desogestrel, a progestin used in birth control pills

== Science and technology ==
- Lunar Gateway, a crewed cislunar space station planned by NASA, formerly Deep Space Gateway
- DOCSIS Set-top Gateway, a technical specification
- Direct-shift gearbox, an electronically controlled, dual-clutch, multiple-shaft, automatic gearbox
- Disodium glutamate, a salt of glutamic acid

== Other uses ==
- David Shankle Group, a heavy metal band
- Deutsche Schule Genf, a German international school near Geneva, Switzerland
- Dick's Sporting Goods Park, a soccer-specific stadium near Denver, Colorado
- Diocesan School for Girls (disambiguation), various schools
- Direct-Shift Gearbox, a type of automotive gearbox from Volkswagen Group
- Dame of Saint Gregory, female variant of class in one of the orders of knighthood of the Holy See
