= DTM =

DTM may refer to:

== Arts and entertainment ==
- Dennis the Menace (disambiguation), two comic strips and related media
- Desktop music, in Japan
- Detroit Techno Militia, a music collective in Michigan, US
- "Diamond Boy (DTM)", a song by SZA from the album Lana (2024)

== Computing and telecommunication ==
- Data Transfer Manager, a form of autonomous peripheral operations in microcontrollers
- Deterministic turing machine, an abstract symbol-manipulating device that was first described in 1936 by Alan Turing
- Digital terrain model, a digital representation of ground-surface topography or terrain
- Digital transaction management, a category of cloud services designed to digitally manage document-based transactions
- Driver Test Manager, a test-automation framework provided by Microsoft as a part of Windows Driver Kit (WDK)
- Dual Transfer Mode, supporting simultaneous voice and packet data in a GSM network
- Dynamic synchronous Transfer Mode, a networking technology

== Motorsport ==
- Deutsche Tourenwagen Masters, a series since 2000
- Deutsche Tourenwagen Meisterschaft, a championship, 1984–1996

== Places ==
- DTM (nightclub), Helsinki, Finland (1992–2025)
- Dortmund Airport, Germany (IATA:DTM)

== Science ==
- Demographic transition model, a model used to represent the changes in birth- and death-rates of a country
- Dermatophyte test medium, a specialized agar used to diagnose a fungal infection of the skin

== Other uses ==
- Distinguished Toastmaster, a certification of Toastmasters International
- Distance to mate, in chess endgames
- DTM, variant of the Degtyaryov machine gun for mounting and loading in armoured fighting vehicles
