= Domestic Nuclear Detection Office =

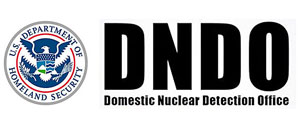

Agency overview
- Formed: April 15, 2005
- Superseding agency: Countering Weapons of Mass Destruction Office
- Jurisdiction: United States
- Employees: 137
- Annual budget: US$563,800,000
- Agency executive: James F. McDonnell, Director
- Parent agency: United States Department of Homeland Security
- Child agencies: Systems Architecture Directorate; Mission Management Directorate; Product Acquisition and Deployment Directorate; Transformational and Applied Research Directorate; Systems Engineering and Evaluation Directorate; Operations Support Directorate; National Technical Nuclear Forensics Center; Red Teaming and Net Assessments
- Website: dhs.gov/about-domestic-nuclear-detection-office

The Domestic Nuclear Detection Office (DNDO) is a jointly staffed office established on April 15, 2005 by the United States to improve the nation’s capability to detect and report unauthorized attempts to import, possess, store, develop, or transport nuclear or radiological material for use against the nation, and to further enhance this capability over time.

DNDO coordinates United States federal efforts to detect and protect against nuclear and radiological terrorism against the United States. DNDO, utilizing its interagency staff, is responsible for the development of the global nuclear detection architecture, the underlying strategy that guides the U.S. government’s nuclear detection efforts. DNDO conducts its own research, development, test, and evaluation of nuclear and radiological detection technologies, and is responsible for acquiring the technology systems necessary to implement the domestic portions of the global nuclear detection architecture. DNDO also provides standardized threat assessments, technical support, training, and response protocols for federal and non-federal partners. In December 2017, DNDO became one of the constituent components of the newly formed Countering Weapons of Mass Destruction office.

== Accusations of Failed Programs ==
DNDO has come under heavy criticism for its failed Advanced Spectroscopic Portal Monitor (ASP) and Cargo Advanced Automated Radiography System (CAARS) programs. The U.S. Senate Committee on Homeland Security and Government Affairs has accused DNDO of wasting 5 years and millions of dollars. As of June 30, 2010, DNDO had spent $200 million trying to develop a new radiation detection technology – the ASP - that the Government Accountability Office (GAO) has concluded is only marginally better than existing technology. The ASP may have drained resources from other programs, including development and deployment of mobile, portable or hand-held technologies that could screen other types of inbound cargo or bulk shipments, like international trains and commercial aviation.

According to the GAO, from the start of the CAARS program in 2005 until the course correction in December 2007, DNDO planned the acquisition and deployment of CAARS machines without understanding that they would not fit within existing primary inspection lanes at CBP ports of entry. This occurred because during the first year or more of the program DNDO and CBP had few discussions about operating requirements for primary inspection lanes at ports of entry. In addition, the CAARS program was among numerous acquisition programs at DNDO for which appropriate DHS oversight was lacking. Furthermore, the development of the CAARS algorithms—a key part of the machine needed to identify shielded nuclear materials automatically—did not mature at a rapid enough pace to warrant acquisition and deployment. Moreover, the description of the progress of the CAARS program used to support funding requests in DNDO’s budget justifications for fiscal years 2009 through 2011 was misleading because it did not reflect the actual status of the program.

== Accusations of Misleading Congress ==
For fiscal year 2009 through fiscal year 2011, DHS justified annual budget requests to Congress by citing significant plans and accomplishments of the CAARS program, including that CAARS technology development and deployment was feasible, even though DNDO had made the decision in December 2007 to cancel the acquisition of CAARS. For example, in its fiscal year 2009 budget justification, DHS stated that a preliminary DNDO/CBP CAARS production and deployment program had been successfully developed and that CAARS machines would be developed that would detect both contraband and shielded nuclear material with little or no impact on CBP operations. The fiscal years 2010 and 2011 DHS budget justifications both cited that an ongoing testing campaign would lead to a cost benefit analysis, followed by rapid development of a prototype that would lead to a pilot deployment at a CBP point of entry.

Furthermore, the fiscal year 2010 budget justification stated that while the CAARS technology was less mature than originally estimated, successful development was still feasible. However, DHS’s description and assessment of the CAARS program in its budget justification did not reflect the actual progress of the program. Specifically, DNDO officials told GAO that when they made their course correction and cancelled the acquisition part of the program in 2007, they also decided not to conduct a cost benefit analysis because such analyses are generally needed to justify going forward with acquisitions. In addition, DNDO completed CAARS testing in March 2010; however, as of today, the final test results for two of the three CAARS machines are not yet available. Currently, no CAARS machines have been deployed. CAARS machines from various vendors have either been disassembled or sit idle without being tested in a port environment, and CBP is considering whether to allow DNDO to collect operational data in a port environment. During recent discussions with DNDO officials, they agreed that the language in the budget justifications lacked clarity and stated that they are not planning to complete a cost benefit analysis since such analyses are generally associated with acquisition programs.
