= White House Market =

Defunct darknet marketplace

- Website type: Darknet market
- Available in: English
- Owner: Mr.White
- Website: auzbdiguv5qtp37xoma3n4xfch62duxtdiu4cfrrwbxgckipd4aktxid.onion ^{(Accessing link help)}
- Commercial: Yes
- Registration: Required
- Users: 350,000
- Launched: August 2019
- Current status: Retired

White House Market (WHM) was a darknet market that operated intermittently from August 24, 2019, to October 2, 2021. While the marketplace featured various illegal products, its main focus was on narcotics, particularly in European territories. It distinguished itself through operational security measures, including mandatory JavaScript disabling and an effective moderation team that mediated disputes between users.

== History ==
Launched in August 2019 and exclusively accessible through the Tor network, WHM garnered a significant user base with almost 895,000 registered users, 3,450 vendors, and nearly 47,500 listings, according to its home page. WHM gained prominence by filling the gap left by other darknet markets such as Dream Market and Empire Market after their closures in mid-2019 and 2020, respectively.

The market employed various strategies to enhance security, such as Pretty Good Privacy (PGP) encryption for all communications and a shift to prioritizing Monero, a decentralized cryptocurrency known for its privacy features. With an estimated sales volume of up to $120 million, the administrators may have profited nearly $5 million. White House Market implemented user-friendly features, such as a bug bounty program, fast customer service, and a simple design without unnecessary elements. The market operated in English, with limited support in Spanish or French, and accepted Monero as the exclusive payment method. It was one of the longest running and profitable markets for its time.

Noteworthy features included a lack of withdrawal or deposit limits, a 5% fee for sellers (with no fee for buyers), and private listings for custom orders or discounts. WHM also emphasized security through measures like end-to-end encryption for messages, mandatory two-factor authentication based on a word list, and the encryption of sensitive data. The market's commitment to privacy extended to the minimal retention of plaintext information and the encryption of various elements, including messages, support tickets, and order details.

Despite the closure of WHM in October 2021, its impact on the dark web landscape is evident, as it set market wide standards for security and user privacy during its operational period.

== DrugHub Rebrand ==
The team behind White House Market opened a new darknet market, DrugHub, in August 2023.
