= DCFC =

DCFC can stand for:

== Sport ==
- Daejeon Citizen, a South Korean football club
- Derby County Football Club, an English football club
- Derry Celtic F.C., defunct Northern Irish football club
- Derry City Football Club, an Irish football club
- Detroit City FC, an American soccer club
- Donegal Celtic Football Club, a Northern Irish football club
- Dublin City Football Club, a now defunct Irish football club
- Dungiven Celtic F.C.
- Durham City F.C., an English non-league football club

== Other uses ==
- Death Cab for Cutie, an American indie rock band
- Direct Carbon Fuel Cell
- Direct Current Fast Charge, a method of recharging electric vehicle batteries
- Dream City Film Club, a British band
- Dry-column flash chromatography, a type of column chromatography.
