= DMSO (disambiguation) =

DMSO is dimethyl sulfoxide, an organosulfur compound with the formula (CH_{3})_{2}SO.

DMSO may also refer to:

- Deuterated DMSO, an isotopologue of dimethyl sulfoxide used as a solvent in Nuclear Magnetic Resonance spectroscopy.
- Defense Modeling and Simulation Office, the former name of the Modeling and Simulation Coordination Office in the U.S. Department of Defense
- Des Moines Symphony Orchestra, in Des Moines, Iowa, United States
- Driving Motor Standard Open, a type of rail vehicle found in British multiple unit trains such as the British Rail Class 315
- "D.M.S.O.", a song by Dead Kennedys from the album Bedtime For Democracy
