= DRMS =

DRMS may refer to: Dhyan Record Management & Consulting Services -

- Defense Reutilization and Marketing Service, an entity that disposes of United States military surplus
- Digital rights management system — see Digital rights management
- Distributed resource management system (more commonly known as a job scheduler), a software that is in charge of unattended background executions in a distributed computing system
- Desert Ridge Middle School, a middle school in Albuquerque, New Mexico, USA

 Demand Response Management System
