= DLS =

DLS or D.L.S. may refer to:

== Education ==
- Doctor of Liberal Studies, an academic degree

== Organizations ==
- Democratic Left Scotland
- Danmarks Liberale Studerende or Liberal Students of Denmark
- Directorate Legal Services, or RAF Legal Branch
- Demosthenian Literary Society

== Science ==
- Deep Lens Survey, Deep Gravitational Lensing Survey in astronomy
- Diamond Light Source, the UK's national synchrotron light source
- Directed line segment, a geometry concept
- Dynamic light scattering, a technique in physics
- Dynamic Label Segment in Digital Audio Broadcasting

=== Computers ===
- Depth-limited search
- DLS formats, for digital music
- Dynamic Languages Symposium, a SIGPLAN programming conference

== Other uses ==
- Dominion Land Survey, Canada
- Duckworth–Lewis–Stern method of calculating cricket scores
- Columbia Gorge Regional Airport, US, IATA code
