= DMSP =

DMSP may refer to:

- Defense Meteorological Satellite Program, a United States Department of Defense satellite system
- Dimethylsulfoniopropionate, an important component of the organic sulfur cycle
- Data management and sharing plan
