= DWG (disambiguation) =

DWG may refer to:

- .dwg, a file format used by CAD packages etc.
- Distillers wet grains, a by-product of distillation
- Digital waveguide, in the digital waveguide synthesis of audio
- Order of Great Victory of the Thunder Dragon, a Bhutanese award (post-nominal letters: DWG)
- Part of the Gunashli oilfield in the Caspian Sea
- Deisel-Wemmer-Gilbert Corporation, a cigar company, a predecessor of The Wendy's Company fast food holding company
- Delaware Water Gap, geographical feature on the Delaware River, United States
- Damwon Gaming, a Korean esports organisation
