= DSM =

DSM or dsm may refer to:

== Science and technology ==
- Deep space maneuver
- Deep sea mining
- Design structure matrix or dependency structure matrix, a representation of a system or project
- Diagnostic and Statistical Manual of Mental Disorders
  - DSM-5, the fifth edition of the DSM
  - DSM-5-TR, text revision of the DSM-5
- Digital Standard MUMPS, a version of the MUMPS programming language created by Digital Equipment Corporation
- Digital surface model, another term for digital elevation model, used to digitally map topography
- DiskStation Manager, a Linux-based operating system used by Synology
- Distributed shared memory, software and hardware implementations in which each cluster node accesses a large shared memory
- Door status monitor, a device that reads whether a door is open or closed
- Dynamic scattering mode, a principle used by the first operational liquid-crystal display
- Dynamic spectrum management, a technique to increase bandwidth over DSL
- Doctor of Medicine, awarded as specialized or surgical medicine (D.SM)

== Organisations and economics ==
- DSM (company), a Dutch multinational life sciences and materials sciences company
- Demand-side management, actions that influence energy use by consumers
- Diamond-Star Motors, a former automobile-manufacturing venture
- Doha Securities Market, former name of the Qatar Exchange stock market
- Deutsche Sammlung von Mikroorganismen und Zellkulturen, an organization that collects microorganisms

=== Politics ===
- Democratic Socialist Movement (Nigeria), a political organisation in Nigeria
- Democratic Socialist Movement (South Africa), a political organisation in South Africa

=== Education ===
- Deutsche Schule Madrid (Colegio Alemán Madrid), a German international school in Madrid, Spain
- Deutsche Schule Montevideo (Colegio Alemán de Montevideo), a German international school in Montevideo, Uruguay
- German School of Milan (Deutsche Schule Mailand), a German international school in Milan, Italy

== Other uses ==
- Dover Street Market, retailer
- Des Moines International Airport (IATA code)
- Distinguished Service Medal (disambiguation)
- Deputy Stage Manager, a position in theatre production
- Team DSM (men's team), a professional cycling team
