= DCOP =

DCOP may refer to:

- Distributed constraint optimization, a framework for constraint optimization problems in which each variable may be owned by a different agent
- Deputy Commissioner of Police, a position in some police departments
