= DVO (disambiguation) =

DVO may refer to:

- Francisco Bangoy International Airport, an airport in Davao City, Philippines with the IATA code DVO
- Marin County Airport, an airport in Marin County, California, USA with the FAA LID code DVO
- DVO, a Dutch football club that became VV DOVO
- Serial DVO, a proprietary Intel technology introduced with their 9xx-series of motherboard chipsets
- Dundas Valley Orchestra, a community orchestra in Dundas, Ontario, Canada
- Denise van Outen (born 1974), English actress, singer and television presenter.

== See also ==
- Ckv DVO, a Dutch korfball club
