= DRT =

DRT may refer to:

== Arts and entertainment ==
- DRT Entertainment, an American record label
- Drag Race Thailand, a Thai television show

== Science ==
- Decimal reduction time, the period to kill 90% of microbes at a temperature
- Defense associated reverse transcriptase, a class of prokaryotic antiviral systems
- Discourse Representation Theory, in linguistics

== Transport ==
- Del Rio International Airport, Texas, United States (IATA code)
- Demand-responsive transport, a form of public bus service
- Downtown Relief Line, a proposed subway line in Toronto, Canada
- Durham Region Transit, a Canadian public transit operator
- Digital-rail Rapid Transit, a type of Autonomous Rail Rapid Transit

== Other uses ==
- Daughters of the Republic of Texas, a lineage society
- Dismounted reconnaissance troop, a type of U.S. Army formation
- Doña Remedios Trinidad, Bulacan, a municipality in the Philippines
