= DTG =

DTG may refer to:

== Arts and entertainment ==
- DTG (rapper), British artist on S1mba song "Rover"
- Dovetail Games, a British video game developer and publisher
- Digital TV Group, UK members' association for digital television

== Science, medicine and technology ==
- Differential thermogravimetry, in differential thermal analysis
- Direct to garment printing, of textiles
- Ditolylguanidine, an experimental antidepressant drug
- Dolutegravir, an antiretroviral drug
- Dynamic theory of gravity, a unified field theory developed by Nikola Tesla

== Transport ==
- Diesel Traction Group, a New Zealand railway preservation group
- Dwight Airport, Illinois, US (ICAO:DTG)

== Other uses ==
- Date-time group, in military communication
- Deutsche Treuhand-Gesellschaft, a German accounting firm merged with Klynveld Kraayenhof & Co. in 1979
