= Dres =

Dres or DRES may refer to:

- Dres (Polish subculture) (plural dresy or dresiarze) is a term used in Poland to describe a subculture of young males.
- Dres, hamlet in Cles, Italy
- Dres (rapper), Andres Titus, a rapper of the alternative hip hop duo Black Sheep
- Drês, a 2009 album by Nando Reis
- Dres, fictional dwarf planet in the video game Kerbal Space Program

== Acronyms ==
- Defence Research Establishment Suffield, the former name for the military research facility near Suffield, Alberta
- Ukrainian: ДРЕС Thermal power stations in Russia and Soviet Union
