= DQ =

DQ may stand for:

== In arts and entertainment ==
- Dragon Quest, a series of console role-playing games created by Enix
- Dragon Quest (video game), The first game in the series released in 1986
- DragonQuest, a 1980 role-playing game created by SPI

== Businesses ==
- Dairy Queen, a fast food chain
- Coastal Air Transport (IATA code DQ)
- DQ Entertainment, an Indian animation studio

== People ==
- DQ (artist), Danish singer, participant in Eurovision Song Contest 2007
- Dan Quayle, American politician
- Dulquer Salmaan, Indian actor and singer
- Dan Quinn (American football), football coach

== In science and technology ==
- HLA DQ, a human leukocyte antigen type protein
- Data quality, various measures in information science
- Design qualification, part of verification and validation
- Digital Intelligence Quotient, a form of intelligence that combines knowledge in information technology and the socio-emotional ability to interact effectively through this medium
- Double-ended queue, a data type in computer science

== In sport ==
- Disqualification (athletics)
- Disqualification (boxing)
- Disqualification (professional wrestling)
- Disqualification (tennis)
- Disqualification (Formula 1)

== Other uses ==
- Donegal Quay, quay by the River Lagan, Belfast
- DQ code, used in telephone directory assistance in the UK
- Jarvis Island (FIPS PUB 10-4 territory code DQ)
- Fiji (aircraft registration prefix DQ)
