= Detachment left in contact =

A detachment left in contact (DLIC) is a portion of a military force left in contact position with the enemy as part of a maneuver. The rest of the force then maneuvers to another attacking position. The detachment left in contact maintains the appearance of a full unit in contact until ordered otherwise. It is normally part of a withdrawal not under pressure. The DLIC disengages and withdraws after the main body has begun movement to the next mission.

== Related ==
- Covering force
- Screening (tactical)
- Withdrawal (military)
