= German People's Party (disambiguation) =

The German People's Party was a political party in the Weimar Republic, and existed between 1918 and 1933.

German People's Party may also refer to:

- German People's Party (1868), which existed in Germany between 1868 and 1910
- German People's Party (Austria), which existed in Austria in the early twentieth century
- German People's Party (Romania), which existed in Romania between 1935 and 1938
