= DVU =

DVU may refer to:

- Delaware Valley University, a university in Doylestown, Pennsylvania
- German People's Union, Deutsche Volksunion, a nationalist political party in Germany
