= DCIM =

DCIM may refer to:

- Data center-infrastructure management
- Digital camera images, a directory in digital cameras
- Dirección de Contra-Inteligencia Militar (Military Counterintelligence Directorate), the military intelligence department of Cuba
