= DLR =

DLR may refer to:

== Companies and organizations ==
- Deutsche Luft-Reederei, the first German airline
- Deutschlandradio, a German radio network
- German Aerospace Center (Deutsches Zentrum für Luft- und Raumfahrt)
- DLR Group, a US engineering and design firm
- Digital Realty (NYSE ticker DLR)

== Technology ==
- Design layout record, of telecommunication circuit
- Displacement–length ratio, of a vessel
- Dynamic Language Runtime, Microsoft software

== Other uses ==
- Docklands Light Railway, London, England
- David Lee Roth (born 1954), American rock singer
  - DLR Band, an album by David Lee Roth
- Arise the Republic (Debout la République), a political party in France
- Dicționarul Limbii Române, the most comprehensive dictionary of the Romanian language
- DLR Lexicon, Dún Laoghaire, Ireland library
- Diamond league record, referring to statistics in track and field
