= DBS =

DBS may refer to:

== Music groups ==
- The dB's, a power pop band of the 1970s and 1980s
- d.b.s., a Canadian punk rock band from 1992 to 2001
- Death by Stereo, an American heavy metal/punk rock group from California

== Companies and organizations ==
=== Schools ===
- Diocesan Boys' School, a boys-only Direct Subsidy Scheme secondary school in Hong Kong
- Don Bosco School, Manila, a private elementary and high school in Manila, Philippines
- Dubai British School, a British international school in Dubai, United Arab Emirates
- Dublin Business School, a private business college in Dublin, Ireland
- Durham Business School, the business school of Durham University, UK

=== Other entities ===
- DBS Bank, a Singaporean multinational bank
- DBS Radio, the on-air name of the Dominica Broadcasting Corporation
- Disclosure and Barring Service, United Kingdom public body
- Den Beste Sykkel, a Norwegian bicycle brand and manufacturer
- Donga Broadcasting System, a defunct South Korean radio station

== Science ==
- Deep brain stimulation, a surgical treatment for Parkinson's etc.
- Dibutyl sebacate, an organic chemical
- Dried blood spot testing, a form of bioanalysis

== Technology ==
- Discbox slider, a carton board disc case
- Dealer Business System, a supply chain management application for Caterpillar's dealers
- Digital Book System, an early e-book reader from 1989
- Direct broadcast satellite, satellite television broadcasts intended for home reception
- Aston Martin DBS, 1967–72 automobile model
- Aston Martin DBS V12, 2007–2012 automobile model, officially also called the Aston Martin DBS
- Aston Martin DBS Superleggera, 2018- automobile model

== Other uses ==
- Datu Blah T. Sinsuat, Maguindanao del Norte, a town in the Philippines
- Doctor of Biblical Studies, an academic degree in applied theology
- Dragon Ball Super, a 2015 manga and anime series
