= DPMO =

DPMO may refer to:

- Defects per million opportunities, a measure of process performance
- Defense Prisoner of War/Missing Personnel Office, an agency of the United States Department of Defense
- Dopravní podnik města Olomouce, the urban public transport operator of the city of Olomouc in the Czech Republic
- "D.P.M.O." (song), a song by British rapper Professor Green
