= D-threonine aldolase =

Enzyme

Identifiers
- EC no.: 4.1.2.42

Databases
- BRENDA: enzyme data
- ExPASy: NiceZyme view
- KEGG: enzyme entry
- MetaCyc: metabolic pathway
- Rhea: reactions
- PDB structures: RCSB PDB PDBe PDBsum
Search
- PMC: articles
- PubMed: articles
- NCBI: proteins

D-threonine aldolase (EC 4.1.2.42, D-TA, DTA, low specificity D-TA, low specificity D-threonine aldolase) is an enzyme with systematic name D-threonine acetaldehyde-lyase (glycine-forming). This enzyme catalyses the following chemical reaction

D-threonine $\rightleftharpoons$ glycine + acetaldehyde
D-allothreonine $\rightleftharpoons$ glycine + acetaldehyde

This pyridoxal-phosphate protein is activated by divalent metal cations (e.g. Co^{2+}, Ni^{2+}, Mn^{2+} or Mg^{2+}).
