= DCN =

DCN may refer to:

- Daily Cargo News, an Australian monthly shipping magazine
- Decorin, a protein encoded by the DCN gene
- Deputy Chief of Navy, Australia
- Dorsal cochlear nucleus, a structure on the brainstem
- Dynamic circuit network, a computer network technology
- Data Communication Network, for network management in Radio access networks
- Naval Group, French shipbuilder formerly known as Direction des Constructions Navales (DCN)
- RAAF Base Curtin, IATA airport code "DCN"
