= DVM =

DVM may refer to:

- Dalvik virtual machine, formerly used in the Android operating system
- Diel vertical migration, a pattern of movement used by some organisms
- Digital voltmeter, a type of voltmeter used for measuring electrical potential difference
- Doctor of Veterinary Medicine, a degree received by veterinary physicians as part of their education
