= DTP =

DTP or dtp may refer to:

== Computing ==
- Data Transfer Project, an open-source initiative on data portability
- Dependently typed programming
- Desktop publishing, the creation of documents using page layout skills on a personal computer
- Digital Teaching Platform, educational products
- Distributed transaction processing, the X/Open model of coordinating transactions between multiple participants
- Dynamic Trunking Protocol, a networking protocol from Cisco
- Parasoft DTP, development testing platform

== Medicine ==
- Deep touch pressure, a sensory integration therapy
- Developmental Therapeutics Program, of the National Cancer Institute
- Diphtheria toxin
- Distal tingling on percussion, another term for Tinel's sign
- Drug therapy problems, a categorization of drug problems in pharmaceutical care
- DTP vaccine, a triple vaccine used to inoculate against diphtheria, tetanus and pertussis, also referred as DPT

== Music ==
- Devin Townsend Project, a rock and metal group (2008–2017)
- Disturbing tha Peace, a record label (formed 1998)
- DTP (Sadus album) (demo: 1986; album: 2003)

== Organizations ==
- Democrat Turkey Party (Democrat Türkiye Partisi), a minor party in the late 1990s
- Demokratik Toplum Partisi (Democratic Society Party), a former pro-Kurdish political party in Turkey
- Department of Transport and Planning, government department of Victoria, Australia established in 2019
- Dick Johnson Racing, formerly DJR Team Penske, Australia's oldest motor racing team competing in the Supercars Championship
- Doctoral Training Partnerships, British centres for managing PhD studies
- dTP Entertainment, a German video game producer

== Other uses ==
- Dubai Techno Park, United Arab Emirates
- Dusun language (ISO 639-3 code:dtp), spoken in Malaysia and Brunei
- Dynamic tidal power, a proposed energy technology
