= DLL =

DLL may refer to:

- Baraboo–Wisconsin Dells Airport (FAA ID), an airport near Baraboo, Wisconsin, U.S.
- Data link layer, a layer in the OSI network architecture model
- Davis–Putnam–Logemann–Loveland algorithm, an algorithm for deciding the satisfiability of propositional logic formulae in conjunctive normal form
- Delay-locked loop, a device to reduce clock skew in digital circuits
- Dillon County Airport (IATA code), an airport near Dillon, South Carolina, U.S.
- Distal-less (Dll) gene that controls development of limbs or other appendages in many animals
- DLL Group, a global financial solutions company
- Doubly linked list, a data structure in computer programming
- Dynamic-link library, or a DLL file, as implemented in Microsoft Windows and OS/2
