= DMV =

DMV may refer to:

- Washington metropolitan area, also called the "DMV" (for District of Columbia, Maryland, and Virginia)
- DMV (song), a song by Primus from Pork Soda
- DMV (TV series), an American workplace comedy television series created by Dana Klein for CBS
- Department of motor vehicles, a government agency that administers motor vehicle registration and driver licensing
- Deserted medieval village, a class of former settlement in the UK
- Deutsche Mathematiker-Vereinigung, a German mathematical society
- Deutscher Metallarbeiter-Verband, a German trade union
- Deutscher Motorsport Verband, a German motor sport organisation
- Dorsal nucleus of vagus nerve
- Dual-mode vehicle, a class of vehicle capable of operating on either roads or rails
- Dumpas language’s ISO 639 code
- Dynamic Management Views, a type of SQL view in the Microsoft SQL Server software
