= DIC =

DIC may refer to:

== Biology and chemistry ==
- Diisopropylcarbodiimide, a reagent in organic chemistry
- Disseminated intravascular coagulation, a pathological activation of coagulation (blood clotting) mechanisms
- Dissolved inorganic carbon, the sum of inorganic carbon species in a solution
- Dic (crustacean), a genus of crustacean in the family Diastylidae

== Companies ==
- D.I.C. (department store), a New Zealand department store chain
- DIC Corporation, a Japanese chemical company
- DIC Entertainment, a former film and television production company
- Dic Press, an imprint of VDM Publishing devoted to the reproduction of Wikipedia content
- Deposit Insurance Corporation of Japan
- Dubai International Capital, a private equity company

== Technology ==
- Differential interference contrast microscopy, an illumination technique in optical microscopy
- Digital image correlation, an optical method that employs tracking and image registration techniques
- Digital integrating computer, a digital implementation of a Differential Analyzer
- Dependency injection container, a dependency management technique in software development.

== Other ==
- Democratic Indira Congress (Karunakaran), an Indian political party
- Deviance information criterion, a diagnostic statistic used in Bayesian model selection
- Dicyclic group
- Diploma of Imperial College, awarded by Imperial College London
- Drive-In Classics, a Canadian television station
- Drunk in charge, a drink driving crime in the United Kingdom
- Dubai Industrial City, a dedicated industrial city
- Dubai Internet City, an information technology park

== See also ==
- DIK
- Dick (disambiguation)
