= Digital Distribution Netherlands =

- Founded: 2011
- Founder: Lars Curfs
- Country of origin: Netherlands
- Location: Amsterdam
- Official website: Official website

Digital Distribution Netherlands (DDN) is a Dutch digital music distributor, based in the Netherlands and founded in 2011.

== History ==
DDN started as an Amsterdam based music production company under the name Curves Music, composing music for content creators using freelance music producers. In its first year of business, the company branched a new distribution division under a new name, Digital Distribution Netherlands. In 2013, DDN dissolved the music production activities from its core business, while shifting its focus to ghost distribution. In 2013, the company took on a large number of record label accounts, releasing a wide catalogue of tracks and albums in that same year.

In 2015, the company started a division that specializes in managing the distribution of royalties for songs unrightfully used on digital services such as YouTube, using a database of song recordings and metadata for identification.

To date (2020), more than 12,000 releases have been administrated by DDN.

== Distribution channels ==
DDN has distribution deals with the following services:

- 7digital
- Amazon.com
- Beatport
- Dance All Day
- Deezer
- Deutsche Telekom AG (DTAG)
- Digitally Imported
- Feel Music / Musicaroma
- Google Play
- iTunes / Apple Music
- Juno Records Limited
- MediaNet
- Muve Music
- Nokia Corporation
- PYRO
- Rdio
- Rhapsody
- Shazam
- Spotify
- TIDAL
- Trackitdown.net / Beat.tv
- Traxsource
- Xbox Music
- YouTube / YouTube Red
