= DDA =

DDA may refer to:

- DDA (delay differential analysis), a nonlinear time series analysis tool
- Dda (DNA-dependent ATPase), a DNA helicase
- Delhi Development Authority, the planning agency for Delhi, India
- Demand deposit account, a deposit account held at a bank or other financial institution
- Demand-driven acquisition, a model of library collection development
- Deputy district attorney, state prosecution in American legal system
- Digital differential analyzer, a digital implementation of a differential analyzer
- Digital differential analyzer (graphics algorithm), a method of drawing lines on a computer screen
- Disability Discrimination Act 1992, Australian legislation
- Disability Discrimination Act 1995, UK legislation
- Disability Discrimination Act (Switzerland)
- Discontinuous Deformation Analysis, an analysis procedure used in physics and engineering
- Discrete dipole approximation, method for computing scattering of radiation by particles of arbitrary shape
- Division on Dynamical Astronomy, a branch of the American Astronomical Society
- Doha Development Agenda of the World Trade Organization
- Dual Dynamic Acceleration, an Intel technology for increasing single-threaded performance on multi-core processors
- Dubai Development Authority, a Dubai Government authority that oversees the development, control, municipal, economic and immigration functions across select free zones clusters and other communities by various master developers throughout Dubai
- Dutch Dakota Association, a Dutch organisation dedicated to preserving and operating classic aircraft
- Dynamic difficulty adjustment or dynamic game difficulty balancing, a method of automatically adjusting video game difficulty based on player ability
- DDA is short station code for Duraundha Junction, which is a railway station located in the city of Daraundha, district of Siwan, Bihar, India.
