= DTE =

DTE may refer to:

- Data terminal equipment, an end instrument used in telecommunication and data transmission
- Distance to empty, a feature in an automobile electronic instrument cluster
- Dithioerythritol, a chemical
- DTE (direct to edit), a digital video recording method
- DTE Energy, a Detroit, Michigan-based utility
- Dora the Explorer, a children's animated television show.
- Dual-Tile encoding, another name for byte pair encoding
- Directorate of Technical Education, Maharashtra, an Indian state government agency for higher education.
- Department of Technical Education, a higher education governance body under the government of Kerala, India

== See also ==
- Down to Earth (disambiguation)
