= DBF =

DBF may refer to:

- .dbf, a database file format introduced by dBASE database system, since adopted by other applications as well
- dBf, decibels above a femtowatt, a unit used to measure power and gain
- Distributed Bellman-Ford, a distance-vector routing protocol
- Danmarks Badminton Forbund (Denmark's Badminton Union)
- Diesel Boats Forever, an unofficial United States Navy insignia
- Design/Build/Fly, a radio-controlled aircraft competition
- Digital beamforming, in radar, sonar, audio, and other sensor arrays
- Distributed-feedback laser, a type of a laser
- Edopi language
- Deblocking filter (DBF), a loop filter applied sequentially in High Efficiency Video Coding (HEVC)
- Design Build Finance (DBF), a Project delivery method#Public-private partnership procurement model in US highways, with maintenance and operation in different agreement
