= DTR =

DTR or similar may refer to:

== Medicine ==
- Deep tendon reflex, of muscles
- Dietetic Technician, Registered, a clinical role in the United States

== Technology ==
- Data Terminal Ready, in RS-232 modem communication
- Desktop replacement computer, a large laptop
- Digital Tape Recorder, aboard NASA's Voyager spacecraft

== Other uses ==
- Deuteronomist (Dtr), hypothesised Torah author(s)
- Dorian Thompson-Robinson (born 1999), American football player
- Downtown Radio, a Northern Ireland radio station
