= DCOM =

DCOM may stand for:

- Doctor of Commerce, a doctoral degree given by universities in the Commonwealth countries
- Distributed Component Object Model, a Microsoft technology for software distributed across several networked computers to communicate with each other
- DC One Million, a mini-series and storyline in the DC Comics fictional universe
- DeBusk College of Osteopathic Medicine, a school of osteopathic medicine at Lincoln Memorial University
- The Digital Commerce Association (DCOM) of the Philippines
- Disney Channel Original Movie, a brand given to films/movies created for and played on Disney Channel in the United States
