= Non-DVP =

Form of securities settlement

Non-DVP trading is defined as securities trading where a client's custodian will have to release payment or deliver securities on behalf of the client before there is certainty that it will receive the counter-value in cash or securities, thus incurring settlement risk.

DVP stands for delivery versus payment. A party to a transaction pays for something when it is delivered. When there is a delivery from A to B, delivery is made by A, receipt is had by B. B, the party that receives, is obliged to make a payment.

The issue revolves around:

1. the timing of the transaction
2. the value of the transaction, and
3. the trustworthiness of A and B.

The ideal situation is timing is matched for delivery/receipt and payment without any lag or deferral. If A and B had previous dealings and are completely trustworthy, then they may not mind delay of one or two working days. Whereas if trust has not been established, delay of one hour means the transaction is non-DVP. In terms of value, the larger the value, the greater the urgency for everything to be completely wrapped up.

Note: Whenever there is a delivery, there is a receipt; also known as non-RVP (non-Receipt versus payment).

== See also ==
- Settlement (finance) § Nature of settlement
