= DJI (disambiguation) =

DJI, or Da-Jiang Innovations, is a Chinese technology company.

DJI, dji, or Dji may also refer to:

- S&P Dow Jones Indices, a joint venture that produces stock market indices
  - Dow Jones Industrial Average, a stock market index
- Master Dji (1961–1994), a Haitian rapper
- Dji River, a river in the Central African Republic
- The ISO 3166 code for Djibouti, a country located in the Horn of Africa
- Djinang language (ISO 639-3 code: dji)
