= Zytron =

Weed control herbicide

Names
- Preferred IUPAC name N-[(2,4-Dichlorophenoxy)-methoxyphosphinothioyl]propan-2-amine
- Other names: DMPA; O-2,4-Dichlorophenyl O-methyl isopropyl phosphoramidothioate

Identifiers
CAS Number	299-85-4
3D model (JSmol)	Interactive image
ChemSpider	8940
DrugBank	DB11768
PubChem CID	9299
UNII	IK51552IFH
CompTox Dashboard (EPA)	DTXSID1058052
- InChI: InChI=1S/C10H14Cl2NO2PS/c1-7(2)13-16(17,14-3)15-10-5-4-8(11)6-9(10)12/h4-7H,1-3H3,(H,13,17) Key: PJFGPJQBWSEWKX-UHFFFAOYSA-N
- SMILES: CC(C)NP(=S)(OC)OC1=C(C=C(C=C1)Cl)Cl

Properties
Chemical formula	C_{10}H_{14}Cl_{2}NO_{2}PS
Molar mass	314.16 g·mol^{−1}
Appearance	Solid
Vapor pressure	6.14×10^{−5} mm Hg

Hazards
- Lethal dose or concentration (LD, LC)
LD_{50} (median dose)	270 mg/kg (rat, oral); >1000 mg/kg (dog, oral)
- Except where otherwise noted, data are given for materials in their standard state (at 25 °C [77 °F], 100 kPa). Infobox references

Zytron, also known as DMPA, is a chlorophenoxy herbicide. It controls crabgrass and other weeds in turf preëmergently, and ants, chinch bugs and grubs. It is used on baseball pitches in Australia.

Zytron inhibits microtubule assembly, preventing mitosis. making it a Group 3 / D / K1, similar to dinitroanilines like trifluralin. It was tested and commercially available in the US in 1959, and applied at 10-20 lbs per acre on turf, a high rate compared to other herbicides.

Zytron disappears almost completely from the body within one hour of mammalian exposure. It does not accumulate in soil and is non-harmful to microflora. DMPA has in testing been applied at rates as high as 67 lbs per acre.

Zytron may cause neurotoxicity in chickens. It is an organophosphorus ester, and other such chemicals are known to cause similar neurotoxicity. 100 mg/kg daily for 10 days was considered the minimum effective dose to observably alter hens' behaviour.

Zytron has been sold under the tradenames "Dow Crabgrass Killer", "Dow 1329", "Dowco 118" and "T-H Crabgrass Killer."
