= D.U.I. (TV series) =

American television series

- Genre: Reality
- Country of origin: United States
- Original language: English
- No. of seasons: 1
- No. of episodes: 12

Production
- Production company: Mike Mathis Productions

Original release
- Network: TLC
- Release: December 1, 2011 – July 12, 2012

D.U.I. is an American reality television series featuring police officers. The show premiered on December 1, 2011 on TLC, and is a similar format to COPS, but focuses exclusively on suspects arrested for driving under the influence of alcohol or other drugs. However, unlike COPS, the show will also follow the suspects through the legal system, and will show the personal consequences of their decision to drink and drive for each individual. The first six episodes of the series aired in 2011, with the next six following in 2012.

The series was shot in Oklahoma in Pontotoc, Cleveland, Sequoyah, Tulsa and Oklahoma counties, and features local sheriff's deputies from those counties, as well as Oklahoma Highway Patrol troopers. The show's producers said that Oklahoma was chosen for a shooting location because the state has one of the fastest DUI turnarounds in court, as well as some of the strictest DUI laws in the United States.

== Episode ==
| No. | Title | Original release date |
|---|---|---|
| 1 | "Jessie & Justin" | December 1, 2011 |
| 2 | "Cierra & Jimmy" | December 1, 2011 |
| 3 | "John & Jarrett" | December 8, 2011 |
| 4 | "Wes & Keshia" | December 8, 2011 |
| 5 | "Travis & Casey" | December 15, 2011 |
| 6 | "Jody & James" | December 15, 2011 |
| 7 | "Chantel & Kimberly" | June 28, 2012 |
| 8 | "Jerry & Dakota" | June 28, 2012 |
| 9 | "Jesse & Haley" | July 5, 2012 |
| 10 | "Jason & Curtis" | July 5, 2012 |
| 11 | "Chancellor & Ashley" | July 12, 2012 |
| 12 | "Annie & Michael" | July 12, 2012 |

== See also ==
- Policing in the United States
- Crime in the United States
