= DGB =

DGB may stand for:

- German Trade Union Confederation (German: Deutscher Gewerkschaftsbund)
- German Federation of the Deaf (German: Deutscher Gehörlosen-Bund)
- DGB Financial Group, a Korean banking holding company
- Diy-Gid-Biy, a group of archeological sites in northern Cameroon and Nigeria
- Denver Grainger-Barras, an Australian rules footballer
- Disinformation Governance Board, an advisory board of the United States Department of Homeland Security
- Dirección General de Bachillerato, an educational program of Mexico encompassing the Preparatoria Federal
