= DMD =

DMD may refer to:

== Science, health and medicine ==
- Dimethyldioxirane, an organic molecule
- Disruptive mood dysregulation disorder
- Doctor of Dental Medicine, an academic degree for the profession of Dentistry
- Duchenne muscular dystrophy, a neurodegenerative disease
- Dysmyelogenic leukodystrophy, a neurodegenerative disease
- Dystrophin, a gene and protein involved in Duchenne muscular dystrophy

== Technology ==
- Differential mode delay, a form of signal distortion in optical fiber
- Digital Message Device, a portable terminal which an artillery forward observer could use to communicate firing instructions
- Digital micromirror device, an optical semiconductor on which DLP technology is based
- Digital Multilayer Disk, the fluorescent multilayer optical disc format
- Direct Metal/Material Deposition, a multilayer cladding process where a precisely controlled laser beam is used to melt metal powders onto a substrate
- Dot Matrix Display, an information display device
- Dynamic mode decomposition, method to decompose experimental data into modes, resembling an empirical eigenvalue decomposition.
- Diamond Coin, a Cryptocurrency established in 2013.
- Digital Medical Device (health software for which an EU-wide reimbursement concept is currently being pursued)

== Other ==
- "Dante Must Die", the hardest difficulty in the Devil May Cry game series
- D (programming language)
- Delta Mu Delta, an international honor society
- Demand Media, a social media company's ticker symbol on NYSE
- Dendermonde, a city in Belgium
- Diet Mountain Dew, a sugar free soft drink
- Digital Media Design, an interdisciplinary undergraduate program at the University of Pennsylvania
- Draw Mohammed Day
- United States District Court for the District of Maryland
- Doomadgee Airport, IATA airport code "DMD"
