= DCE =

DCE may refer to:

== Science ==
- Dichloroethanes, organic solvents
- Dichloroethenes, also called dichloroethylene, organic solvents
- Dodecyl creatine ester, a creatine prodrug
- Dynamic contrast enhanced, a type of perfusion MRI

== Computing ==
- Data circuit-terminating equipment, also called data communication(s) equipment or data carrier equipment
- Data Center Ethernet
- Desktop Compositing Engine, now Desktop Window Manager, a component of Microsoft Windows
- Distributed Computing Environment, a specification from The Open Group
- Dead-code elimination, a kind of compiler optimization
- Digital Consumer Enablement, a non-neutral term for Digital rights management

== Organisations ==
- Delhi College of Engineering, University of Delhi, India
- Dalian Commodity Exchange
- Drum Corps Europe

== Other uses ==
- Daly Cherry-Evans
- Detailed City Experience
- Digital currency exchanger
