= DCD =

DCD may refer to:

== Companies and organizations ==
- DCD (company), a South African heavy engineering company
- DCD Media, a television production and distribution company
- Detroit Country Day School, a private school in Beverly Hills, Michigan
- Diamond Comic Distributors, the largest distributor of comic books in the United States
- Dubai Civil Defence, an Emergency Management Organization of Dubai, United Arab Emirates

== Science and medicine ==
- 2-Cyanoguanidine, a fertilizer also known as dicyandiamide
- Developmental coordination disorder also known as developmental dyspraxia, a type of motor learning difficulty
- Dermcidin, an anti-microbial peptide released by human sweat glands
- Donation after Circulatory Death (or Donation after Cardiac Death), donation of organs after clinical death

== Other ==
- Data Carrier Detect, a term used with modems and the RS-232 interface
- Dead Can Dance, a musical duo from Australia
- Def Con Dos, a Spanish rap metal band
- Deseret Chemical Depot, a U.S. Army chemical weapon storage area in Utah
- Double crossover diamond interchange, a type of highway interchange
- Dual currency deposit, a derivative instrument
- Dundonald, County Down, Northern Ireland, a town near Belfast
