= DFL (disambiguation) =

The Minnesota Democratic–Farmer–Labor Party, an affiliate of the U.S. Democratic Party.

DFL may also refer to:

- Cosworth DFL, a variant of the Cosworth DFV Formula One engine, intended for Group C racing
- David Florida Laboratory, a Canadian aerospace laboratory
- Degree of financial leverage, a metric of leverage (finance)
- Dead Fucking Last, a US punk band
- Democrats for Life, an organization of anti-abortion Democrats
- Design for logistics, a supply-chain management concept
- Deutsche Fußball Liga, operator of the German Fußball-Bundesliga
- DFL Deutsche Fußball Liga e.V., union of German professional football clubs
- Dongfeng Motor Co., Ltd., a joint-venture between Dongfeng and Nissan
- Dunfermline Queen Margaret railway station, National Rail station code DFL, in Scotland
