= DNR =

DNR may refer to:

- Do not resuscitate, a medical instruction

== Media and entertainment ==
- DNR (music), a UK songwriting and production duo
- Dreams Now Reality, an Italian glam rock band
- "D.N.R. (Do Not Resuscitate)", a song by Testament from The Gathering
- DNR (Shameless), an episode of the American TV series Shameless
- DNR, an episode of House, a medical drama
- D.N.R., an episode of Becker, a situation comedy
- Daily News Record, a fashion periodical
- Do Not Reboot, an Evil Neuro EP

== Places ==
- Donetsk People's Republic (Russian: Донецкая Народная Республика, romanized: Donetskaya Narodnaya Respublika), a disputed republic of Russia and former quasi-state in Ukraine
- Dinard–Pleurtuit–Saint-Malo Airport, in France, IATA code
- Desert National Wildlife Refuge, in Nevada, USA

== Other uses ==
- Department of Natural Resources (disambiguation), various government bodies in Australia, Canada and the United States
- Dialed number recorder, a telephone surveillance device
- Dynamic Noise Reduction, in telephony

== See also ==
- Do not resuscitate (disambiguation)
