= DB =

DB, dB or db may refer to:

== Arts, entertainment and media ==
- Daily Bugle or DB, a fictional New York City newspaper in Marvel Comics
- Doing Business Report, by the World Bank Group
- Dragon Ball, a Japanese media franchise

=== Music ===
- D♭ (musical note)
- DB Records, Atlanta, Georgia, US
- The dB's, an American band in the 1980s
- DJ DB, a New York–based British DJ

== Brands and enterprises ==
- DB (car), a French automobile maker
- Brit Air (IATA airline code)
- DB Breweries, a New Zealand company
- DB Networks, an American information security firm
- Deutsche Bahn, a German railway company since 1994
- Deutsche Bank (NYSE symbol), a multinational investment bank headquartered in Frankfurt, Germany
- Deutsche Bundesbahn, national railway company of the Federal Republic of Germany, 1949–1994
- Dolderbahn, a rack railway in Zürich, Switzerland

== Places ==
- Dâmbovița County (ISO 3166-2:RO code), Romania
- DB Draw, a bridge over the Passaic River, US
- Discovery Bay, a residential development in Hong Kong
- Dobyns-Bennett High School, Kingsport, Tennessee, US

== Science and technology ==
- Database (DB), an organized collection of data on a computer system.
- .db, file extension for some database files
- Decibel (dB), acoustics and electronics unit
- Dubnium, symbol Db, a chemical element
- dyne:bolic, a Linux distribution
- dry bulb, a temperature definition
- dry basis, a way to measure percentages of components in a chemical composition

== Other uses ==
- ȸ, the db-digraph a ligature of "d" and "b" in African linguistics
- Defensive back, a position in American football and Canadian football
- Defined benefit pension plan, a scheme for retirement plans
- Double-breasted, a style of garment with wide, overlapping front flaps
- State Security Directorate (Serbia), Serbian secret police
- North Sulawesi (vehicle registration prefix DB)

== See also ==
- Detective Branch (DB), Bangladeshi law-enforcement agency
- DB, the model names of some Aston Martin vehicles
  - David Brown (entrepreneur) (1904–1993), whose initials are on a series of Aston Martin cars
- DB9, DB25, etc., types of D-subminiature connector
- D&B (disambiguation)
