= DIF (technique) =

DIF is a greenhouse technique involving temperature control for the purpose of controlling plant internode length and thus elongation rates. DIF's effectiveness has led to a reduction in the need and use of chemical plant growth regulators. Although many common greenhouse plants do react strongly to -DIF, there are some plants which show little or no response to -DIF.

== Basics ==
DIF refers to the difference between daytime and nighttime temperatures. DIF is calculated by subtracting the nighttime temperature from the daytime temperature to get a +DIF when the daytime is warmer, or a -DIF when the night time is warmer. When there is a +DIF, elongation rates are normal, but when there is a -DIF elongation rates are lowered. As nights are generally cooler than days, the DIF technique is only actively utilized to slow growth, not to increase growth.

Instead of increasing heating all through the night, which can be very expensive, another approach to getting a -DIF response is to decrease the temperature in the greenhouse at dawn for 2-3hours. This temporary decrease in temperature from night to day tricks the plant into responding as if there was a -DIF. An optimal DIF is around -10 when measuring in Fahrenheit or approximately -6 in Celsius.

== Drawbacks ==
DIF treatments can also slow the development rate when the average daytime temperature is decreased. Very high -DIFs can also led to problems such as chlorosis in lilies.
