= DRC (disambiguation) =

The Democratic Republic of the Congo, commonly abbreviated as DRC, is a country in Central Africa.

DRC may also refer to:

== Organisations ==
- Danish Refugee Council, a Danish humanitarian organisation
- Democratic Representative Caucus, a group of Canadian Members of Parliament
- Disability Rights California, the primary statewide disability rights organization in California
- Disability Rights Commission, a body set up by the British Parliament
- Dynamics Research Corporation, a US-based defense contractor

== Science and technology ==
- Design rule checking, area of electronic design automation
- Digital room correction, a process in the field of acoustics
- Dynamic range compression, a process that manipulates an audio signal (also known as “Dynamic range control”)
- Dynamic recompilation, a technique of translating machine code
- DARPA Robotics Challenge
- Domain relational calculus, a database query language
- Descending reflectivity core, a meteorological phenomenon

== Other uses ==
- DRC railcar, a railway vehicle in Victoria, Australia
- Democratic Resettlement Community, an informal settlement in Swakopmund, Namibia
- Democratic Representative Caucus a former parliamentary group in Canada
- Domaine de la Romanée-Conti, a wine producer of Burgundy, France
- Dominique Rodgers-Cromartie, a former American football player
- Dr. Regis Chaperon State Secondary School, a secondary school in Mauritius
- Detonautas Roque Clube, a Brazilian rock-band
- Dirico Airport's IATA code
- DRC, the Challoner revision of the Douay–Rheims Bible
