= DBR =

DBR may refer to:

== Arts and entertainment ==
- Daniel Bernard Roumain (born 1970), composer and violinist
- De Bellis Renationis, renaissance wargaming rules
- Days Before Rodeo, 2014 mixtape by Travis Scott

== Science and technology ==
- Design-based research in the learning sciences
- Deuterium bromide (chemical formula: DBr)
- Distributed Bragg reflector, used in waveguides
- Double-blind review

== Transport ==
- Bad Doberan (district)—DBR on Germany license plates
- Derby Road (Ipswich) railway station, Suffolk, England (CRS code:DBR)
- Dowel bar retrofit, a highway crack treatment
- New Zealand DB class locomotive of rail locomotive

Airlines with ICAO code DBR:

- DutchBird, 2000–2004
- Dobrolet (airline), 2013–2014

== Other uses ==
- Drum-Buffer-Rope, in the theory of constraints management paradigm
- State Bureau of Investigation (Ukraine) (abbr. DBR: Derzhavne Biuro Rozsliduvan)
- Disclosure and Barring Service provides wider access to criminal record information through its disclosure service for England and Wales.
