= DTL (disambiguation) =

DTL is diode–transistor logic, a class of digital circuit.

DTL may also refer to:

- DTL (gene), in the human genome
- Delhi Transco Limited, an Indian power distributor
- Downtown Line, a metro line in Singapore
- Down-The-Line, in clay-pigeon shooting
- Drawn to Life, a video game
- Dutch Type Library, a font foundry

== See also ==
- Datagram Transport Layer Security (DTLS)
