= DS =

DS may refer to:

== Arts and entertainment ==
=== Video games ===
- Nintendo DS, handheld game console
  - Nintendo DSi, third iteration of the Nintendo DS
- Deca Sports, a sports video game series
  - Deca Sports (video game), the first game of the series
- Double Spoiler, a game in the Touhou Project series
- Dark Souls, a series of action role-playing games
  - Dark Souls (video game), the first game in the series
- Death Stranding, an action game
- Don't Starve, a survival game

=== Music ===
- "D.S." (song), a 1995 song by Michael Jackson
- Dal segno (D.S.), a navigation marker in music notation

=== Comics ===
- Demon Slayer: Kimetsu no Yaiba, a Japanese manga series by Koyoharu Gotouge

== Organisations ==
- Committee for State Security (Bulgaria), a former Bulgarian secret service
- Democratici di Sinistra (Democrats of the Left), a former Italian political party
- Democratic Party (Demokratska stranka), a political party in Serbia
- Bureau of Diplomatic Security, in the US Department of State

== Science and technology ==
- Dwarf spiral galaxy (dS)
- Darmstadtium (symbol Ds), a chemical element
- Data science
- Degree of substitution, relative density of substituent groups in a polymer
- Dielectric spectroscopy, measuring dielectric properties of medium
- Directional symmetry (time series)
- Dnepropetrovsk Sputnik, a class of Soviet satellites

=== Computing ===
- DS register, of X86 processor
- Avid DS, defunct editing and effects software
- Delegation Signer, DNSSEC record type
- DirectShow, Microsoft API
- Nintendo DS
  - Nintendo DSi
- DualShock, line of gamepads for PlayStation
- DeepSeek (chatbot)

=== Mathematics ===
- ds (elliptic function), one of Jacobi's elliptic functions
- De Sitter space (dS)

=== Medicine ===
- Down syndrome, a genetic disorder
- Duodenal switch, a weight-loss surgery

== Transportation ==
- DS Automobiles, a French car marque
- Citroën DS Inside (2009), a concept car
- Citroën DS (1955–1975), a car model
- EasyJet Switzerland (IATA code: DS), an airline

== Weapons ==
- 7.92 DS, a Polish-designed anti-tank ammunition type
- DS-39, Degtyaryova Stankovyi Model 1939, a Russian medium machine gun

== Other uses ==
- Detective Sergeant, UK police rank
- Detective Superintendent, UK and Australian police rank
- Diodorus Siculus (D.S. or DS), a first-century BCE Greek historian
- Dominance and submission (D/s), a set of behaviors
- Enchiridion symbolorum, definitionum et declarationum de rebus fidei et morum ("Denzinger-Schönmetzer", DS), a book of Catholic dogma
- Different subject (DS), in switch-reference
- AutoDS, a dropshipping platform and company of the same name

== See also ==
- "DS 21", a 1989 song by Jane Child from Jane Child
- D (disambiguation) (for Ds or D's, the plural of "D")
