= DWW =

DWW may refer to:

- Dawawa language
- Dawlish Warren railway station, Dawlish, England
- Directing Workshop for Women, a US film organization
- Doctor Who Weekly, now Doctor Who Magazine, a magazine devoted to the TV series Doctor Who
- Down with Webster, a Canadian rap rock band
  - Down with Webster (album), a 2007 self-titled album
- DWW, a 1992 album by French electronic rock band Heldon
- Distrowatch weekly, a weekly publication of the news website DistroWatch

== See also ==
- DWWW, an AM radio station in Quezon City, Philippines
