= DMT (company) =

German engineering and consulting company

DMT GmbH & Co. KG
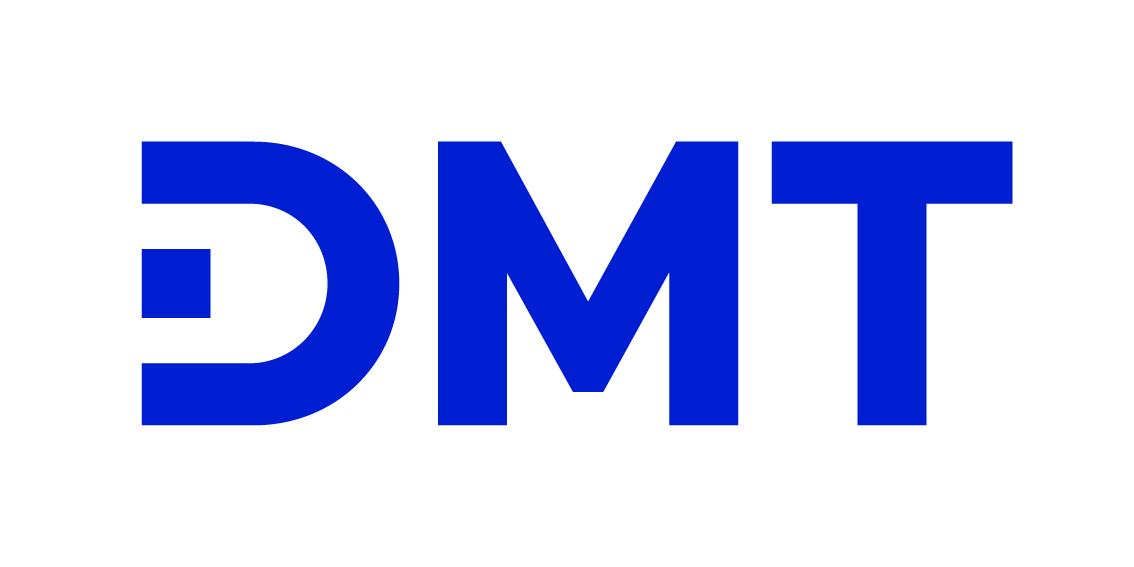
- Company type: GmbH & Co. KG
- Industry: Natural resources
- Founded: 1990
- Headquarters: Essen, Germany, Germany
- Key people: Maik Tiedemann (CEO), Jens-Peter Lux
- Revenue: €113.2 million (2019)
- Number of employees: ~1,000
- Website: Official website

DMT GmbH & Co. KG is an engineering and consulting company based in Essen, Germany. Founded in 1990, DMT has been a subsidiary of TÜV NORD AG since 2007. It operates within the TÜV NORD GROUP, providing engineering and consulting services.

The DMT Group consists of 16 engineering and consulting firms with global locations and around 1,100 employees. The group's annual revenue is approximately €130 million. DMT collaborates on research projects with industry, research institutions, and universities internationally.

== History ==
DMT GmbH & Co. KG traces its corporate history to 1990. It evolved from a series of corporate mergers dating back to 1737 when the Märkische Gewerkschaftskasse was founded. In the 1990s, the business lines were integrated into the newly created Deutsche Montan Technologie für Rohstoff, Energie, Umwelt e.V., where two companies emerged:

- DMT-Gesellschaft für Forschung und Prüfung mbH
- DMT-Gesellschaft für Lehre und Bildung mbH

== Organization ==
DMT GmbH & Co. KG operates 19 testing and specialist centers for safety, with 17 of them being accredited or officially recognized. The company employs approximately 100 recognized experts.

== Service Areas ==
DMT provides engineering services in areas such as plant construction, process engineering, civil engineering, mining, and oil and gas. Its core activities include engineering, consulting, geotechnics, and exploration. The company also develops measurement and monitoring systems for various industries.

=== Geo Engineering and Exploration ===
In this sector, DMT offers services for the development, planning, and monitoring of infrastructure projects, including geotechnical and site investigation, route engineering, and geomonitoring.

=== Mining Consulting and Engineering ===
DMT assists investors, governments, and mining operators throughout the entire lifecycle of a mine, offering services such as resource prospecting, feasibility studies, and mine planning.

=== Industrial Engineering ===
DMT designs and constructs process engineering plants for coking, the chemical industry, and material handling systems for mining.

=== Plant and Product Safety ===
In this domain, DMT addresses safety aspects in various industries, including fire and explosion protection, building systems safety, and product safety and quality.

=== Exploration Seismics ===
DMT provides solutions for reflection and refraction seismic studies.

== Products ==
DMT develops monitoring systems and testing equipment, including geodetic measurement systems, monitoring systems, and devices for flow measurement. The company also offers services for optimization in steel production.
