= DSN =

DSN may refer to:

== Technology ==
=== Computing & Internet ===
- Data set (IBM mainframe) Name, the name of a computer file having a record organization
- Data source name, a data structure used to describe a connection to a data source
- Delivery Status Notification message, an automated electronic mail message about a delivery problem
- Distributed social network, a social network that is decentralised and distributed across multiple providers
- International Conference on Dependable Systems and Networks
- .DSN (design file), industry-standard import file format of Specctra-compatible autorouters

=== Military and Intelligence ===
- Defense Switched Network, a communications network operated by the United States Department of Defense
- DSN DASH, the U.S. Navy's Drone Anti-Submarine Helicopter.
- DSN Satellite Network, a Japanese military X band satellite communications network operated by DSN Corporation
- Directorate State Protection and Intelligence Service (Austrian German: Direktion Staatsschutz und Nachrichtendienst), an Austrian intelligence agency

=== Space ===
- Deep Space Network, a communication network

=== Media and entertainment ===
- Direct Sports Network, a sports centered digital media company, based in Irvine, California
- Daily Silksong News, a YouTube channel covering news about Hollow Knight: Silksong

== Others ==
- Dansk Sprognævn, the Danish Language Council
- Deutsche Schulen Nigeria, a school system which includes the Deutsche Schule Abuja
- IATA code for Ordos Ejin Horo Airport, China
- Star Trek: Deep Space Nine, a science fiction television program
- Doctor of Science in Nursing
