= Distinguished Service Cross =

The Distinguished Service Cross (D.S.C.) is a military decoration for courage. Different versions exist for different countries.

- Distinguished Service Cross (Australia)
- Distinguished Service Cross (United Kingdom)
- Distinguished Service Cross (United States)
