= DNK =

DNK is an acronym. It can be used to refer to:

- Donmika, a multivendor marketplace
- DNK abbreviation for "do not know"
- Danke Apartment separate house renting company in China.
- DNK (duo), a hip-hop duo from North Macedonia
- Denmark, a country in Europe (ISO 3166-1 country code:DNK)
- Dnipro International Airport, an airport in Dnipro, Ukraine (IATA airport code:DNK)
- Donnybrook railway station, Australia
- Deutsches Nationalkomitee Biologie, a German scientific non-profit and non-governmental organisation, representing German biologists on an international level
- DNK (album), a 2023 album by Aya Nakamura
- The German Sustainability Code (German: Deutscher Nachhaltigkeitskodex)
