= DZA =

DZA may refer to:

- Smoke DZA, a musician
- airport code for Dzaoudzi Pamandzi International Airport, in Mayotte, near Madagascar
- ISO 3166-1 alpha-3 code for Algeria
- ISO 639-3 code for the Tunzu language
- D-ZA, initialism for the European Parliament Delegation for relations with South Africa
- Dza (Armenian letter)
