= DMPK =

DMPK may refer to:

- Dystrophia myotonica protein kinase or myotonic dystrophy protein kinase
- Drug metabolism and pharmacokinetics
