= DW =

DW may refer to:

== News media ==
- Deutsche Welle, a Germany-based, international news publisher
  - DW News
  - DW-TV
  - DW (Español)
- Duowei News, or "DW News", an American Chinese-language news website
- The Daily Wire, an American conservative news website

== Businesses and organizations ==
- Daniel Wellington, a Swedish watch company
- Development Workshop, a non-profit organization
- Drum Workshop, or "DW Drums", an American drum kit and hardware manufacturer
- DW Sports Fitness, a defunct British sports and fitness retailer
- Dollywood, a theme park in Tennessee, United States

== Art and entertainment ==
=== Film and television ===
- Darkwing Duck, a cartoon character
- Deadliest Warrior, an American factual television program
- Doctor Who, a British science fiction television programme
- Dora Winifred Read (D.W.), a character in the Arthur TV show and book series

=== Other media ===
- Discworld, a series of stories by Terry Pratchett, 1983–2015
- Digimon World, a 1999 video game
- Dynasty Warriors, a video game series since 1987

== People ==
- Dwyane Wade (born 1982), American basketball player
- Darrell Waltrip (born 1947), American racing driver
- Don West (educator) (1906–1992), American poet and teacher
- Don West (sportscaster) (born 1963), American television presenter
- DW Winnicott (1896–1971), English paediatrician and psychoanalyst

== Software ==
- Data warehouse, a software reporting provision
- Adobe Dreamweaver, a software application for Web development
- DirectWrite, a text layout and glyph rendering API

== Transport ==
- Deadweight tonnage, of ships
- Dry weight, of motor vehicles
- South Sulawesi (Indonesian registration prefix: DW)

== Other uses ==
- DW Stadium, Wigan, England
- Devizes to Westminster International Canoe Race, a canoe race in England
- Double-wide, a large mobile home
- Durbin–Watson statistic, a test statistic
- Dust wrapper, an outer cover for books

== See also ==
- DreamWorks (disambiguation)
