= Directional symmetry (time series) =

Statistical measure of a model's performance

In statistical analysis of time series and in signal processing, directional symmetry is a statistical measure of a model's performance in predicting the direction of change, positive or negative, of a time series from one time period to the next.

== Definition ==
Given a time series $t$ with values $t_i$ at times $i=1, \ldots, n$ and a model that makes predictions for those values $\hat t_i$, then the directional symmetry (DS) statistic is defined as

$$\operatorname{DS}(t,\hat t) = \frac{100}{n-1}\sum_{i=2}^{n}d_i,$$
$$d_i = \begin{cases} 1, & \text{if }(t_i - t_{i-1})(\hat t_i - \hat t_{i-1})> 0 \\ 0, & \text{otherwise} .\end{cases}$$

== Interpretation ==
The DS statistic gives the percentage of occurrences in which the sign of the change in value from one time period to the next is the same for both the actual and predicted time series. The DS statistic is a measure of the performance of a model in predicting the direction of value changes. The case $DS=100\%$ would indicate that a model perfectly predicts the direction of change of a time series from one time period to the next.

== See also ==
- Statistical finance

== Notes and references ==
- Drossu, Radu, and Zoran Obradovic. "INFFC data analysis: lower bounds and testbed design recommendations." Computational Intelligence for Financial Engineering (CIFEr), 1997., Proceedings of the IEEE/IAFE 1997. IEEE, 1997.
- Lawrance, A. J., "Directionality and Reversibility in Time Series", International Statistical Review, 59 (1991), 67–79.
- Tay, Francis EH, and Lijuan Cao. "Application of support vector machines in financial time series forecasting." Omega 29.4 (2001): 309–317.
- Xiong, Tao, Yukun Bao, and Zhongyi Hu. "Beyond one-step-ahead forecasting: Evaluation of alternative multi-step-ahead forecasting models for crude oil prices." Energy Economics 40 (2013): 405–415.
