= Diving Unlimited International =

American manufacturer of dry suits and other diving equipment

Diving Unlimited International (DUI) is an American diving equipment designer and manufacturer. DUI is particularly well known among recreational and technical divers as the maker of high-end dry suits. DUI also manufactures dry suits and associated products for all the branches of the US military and friendly foreign military around the globe.

DUI has several patents related to diving equipment and dry suits. The company was founded in 1963 by Dick Long. DUI's manufacturing facility and main offices are located in San Diego, CA.
