= N,N′-Dimethyl-1,3-propanediamine =

Names
- Preferred IUPAC name N^{1},N^{3}-Dimethylpropane-1,3-diamine
- Other names N,N′-Dimethylaminopropylamine

Identifiers
CAS Number	111-33-1
3D model (JSmol)	Interactive image
ChemSpider	60336
ECHA InfoCard	100.003.509
PubChem CID	66978
UNII	CY959B4RZ2
CompTox Dashboard (EPA)	DTXSID8059398
- InChI: InChI=1S/C5H14N2/c1-6-4-3-5-7-2/h6-7H,3-5H2,1-2H3 Key: UQUPIHHYKUEXQD-UHFFFAOYSA-N; InChI=1/C5H14N2/c1-6-4-3-5-7-2/h6-7H,3-5H2,1-2H3 Key: UQUPIHHYKUEXQD-UHFFFAOYAQ
- SMILES: N(C)CCCNC

Properties
Chemical formula	C_{5}H_{14}N_{2}
Molar mass	102.181 g·mol^{−1}
Density	0.817 g/mL
Boiling point	145 °C (293 °F; 418 K)

Hazards
Flash point	20 °C (68 °F; 293 K)
- Except where otherwise noted, data are given for materials in their standard state (at 25 °C [77 °F], 100 kPa). Infobox references

N,N′-Dimethyl-1,3-propanediamine (DMPA) is a chemical crosslinking reagent.
