= Datapoint's Advanced Systems Language =

DASL
- Designed by: Gene Hughes
- First appeared: March 8, 1983; 43 years ago

Influenced by
- C (programming language) • Pascal (programming language)

DASL (Datapoint's Advanced Systems Language) (pronounced /ˈdæz.əl/, or "dazzle") was a programming language and compiler proprietary to Datapoint, previously known as BABEL, before a trademark conflict was discovered. Primarily influenced by Pascal with some C touches, it was created in the early 1980s by Gene Hughes.

The compiler output was assembly language, which was typically processed through a peep-hole optimizer before the assembler and linker.

Reflecting its name, DASL was used for systems programming, mainly by the vendor itself.
