= Double bass array =

Subwoofer speaker layout

A double bass array (DBA) is a specific layout of subwoofers within a rectangular listening space. It removes unwanted room related resonances (modes) over a wide listening area.

== Preface ==
A DBA requires at least two subwoofers (preferably same make and model) that are placed at opposing walls in a specific layout. The signal played by the subwoofer array on the back wall is inverted and delayed based on the distance to the frontal subwoofer array. This will actively "absorb" any reflected sound.

== Design ==
=== Array layout ===
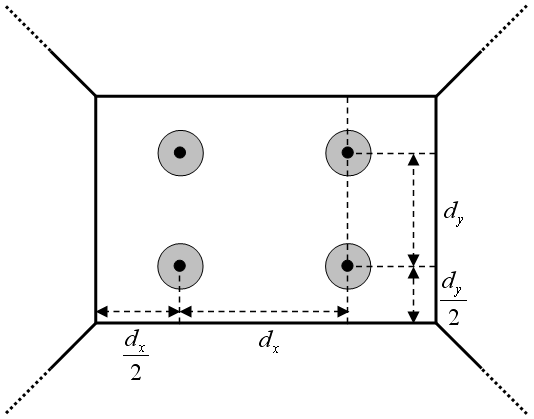
Common configuration with 4 subwoofers

Modes between side walls, floor and ceiling are suppressed by arranging the subwoofer in a specific grid:

$p_x {=} \frac{(2 \cdot n + 1) \cdot w_x}{2 \cdot a_x}$

$p_y {=} \frac{(2 \cdot n + 1) \cdot w_y}{2 \cdot a_y}$

$w_x$: Wall width

$w_y$: Wall height

$p_x$: Horizontal distance from wall ($d_x/2$ for n=0 in picture)

$p_y$: Vertical distance from wall ($d_y/2$ for n=0 in picture)

$a_x$: Number of subwoofers horizontally

$a_y$: Number of subwoofers vertically

Counter $n = {0, 1, 2, 3,..., (a - 1)}$

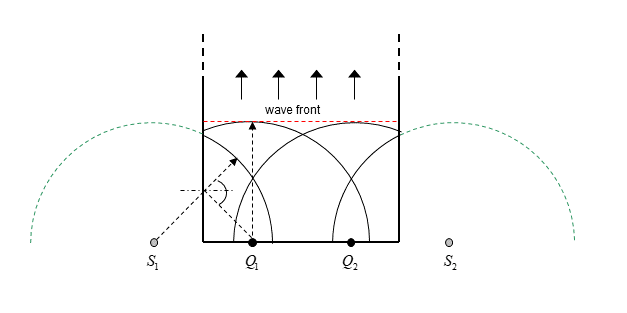
Top view of an array with 2 subwoofer. The walls create mirror sources which results in a plane wave.

With this specific grid layout reflections from the walls act as mirror sources. Interference of the subwoofers and mirror sources create a plane wave up to a certain frequency. The more sources the higher the frequency. This cutoff frequency $f_c$ can be calculated for each dimension as follows:

$f_c {=} \frac{c}{2 \cdot d}$

$c$: Speed of sound

$d$: Distance between subwoofers

Example: A 2 × 2 array on a wall measuring 4 × 3 m would work up to 86Hz horizontally $f_c {=} \frac{343m/s} {2 \cdot 2m}$ and up to 114Hz vertically $f_c {=} \frac{343m/s} {2 \cdot 1.5m}$.

=== Active Absorption ===
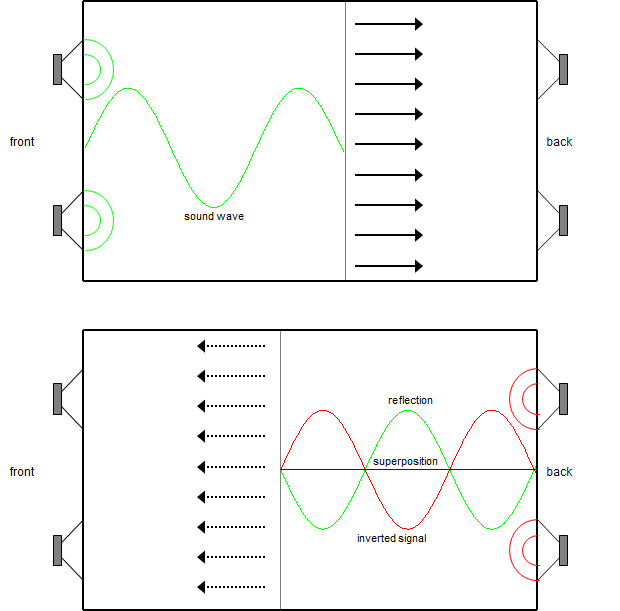
Schematic of active absorption. The bass signal is shown as a transversal wave. The frontal wave is reflected at the back wall. At the same time the back array sends out an inverted wave which cancels the reflection.

Due to the specific grid layout of the subwoofer array most modal effects are suppressed. The length modes on the other hand get fully excited. The array on the back wall will emit a polarity inverted wave at the very same moment the wave from the front wall hits the back wall. Reflection and inverted wave will interfere with each other destructively so the reflection is canceled. This is also known as "active absorption".

The necessary delay $t_d$ of the back array is based on the length $l$ of the room:

$t_d {=} \frac{l}{c}$

$c$: Speed of sound

The necessary delay required for a DBA is available in most digital equalizers or digital crossovers. Polarity of the back array can easily be achieved by inverting the signal coming from the amps or by swapping the cables going to the driver. Most active subwoofers also offer a polarity switch.

== Pros ==
- Sound pressure level throughout the room is very even.
- Modal resonances are reduced to a minimum.
- Subwoofers should be placed as close as possible on the wall where they easily can be made invisible.
- No bulky acoustic room treatments or even structural modifications necessary.
- Simple setup.

== Cons ==
- Rooms properties and furniture can interfere with the propagation of the plane wave.
- Frequency range of the plane wave depends on the number of drivers which can be quite high in large rooms.
- As the back wall array is only used to cancel the energy of the frontal array the overall efficiency isn't good.
- SPL throughout the room is virtually constant which might affect tonal balance with satellite speakers that fall off with listening distance.

== Notes ==
A DBA just requires two opposing walls, so it is possible to have one array on the floor and the other on the ceiling, or one on the left wall and the other on the right. However, low frequencies become localizable at a specific frequency, so in most cases it's probably a good idea to use the walls with the lower distance of separation.

The effectiveness of DBA largely depends on the room's physical characteristics.

- The room should be rectangular
- Walls should be rigid
- Measuring equipment helps to dial in the necessary delay
- The smaller the room, the better
