= Defence Nuclear Material =

Defence Nuclear Material within the UK is defined as:

- Nuclear weapons (warheads)
- Special Nuclear Materials (SNM), including new and used reactor fuel from Royal Navy submarines.
