= Dear husband =

Internet slang

In Internet slang, DH is an abbreviation for dear husband; it is commonly used by women on certain forums to refer to their husbands. Similarly, DD means dear daughter and DS means dear son. The Oxford Dictionary of English dates the origin of DH to the 1990s. It was a part of Internet culture as far back as America Online and remains part of a common "lingua franca across a broad array of parenting boards."

Online communities often develop what lexicographers call a language for special purposes. A study of the language for special purposes used on breast-cancer and infertility forums found that the corpus of both communities was defined by brevity, humor and intra-group unity, in part expressed by replacing terms that would be used in conventional/professional communication settings, such as male partner or luteal phase, with vocabulary particular to the layperson-to-layperson community, such as DH and 2WW [two-week wait].

Hof (2006) writes that DH is not merely shorthand meant to save time, but a "cheeky reference". Drentea & Moren-Cross (2005) write that using DH and DD help stressed-out women maintain their "good mother" social role by softening complaints about their families. The usage of "dear" can also be sarcastic. Owens (2007) writes that DH "suggests a certain distancing".

A statistical analysis of approximately 50 million posts on a parenting forum found that "Almost five percent of posts are about dh, or dear husband, but these posts tend to express more negative emotion than other posts." The researcher theorized that the relative anonymity of the forum and the ability to dissociate and compartmentalize online contribute to this effect, asserting "This culture of disinhibition and conventional signaling creates a safe space online for moms to explore their own roles and identity and a variety of other topics." The study also found that "there were only 48 references to dear husband across all of YBM posts compared to over 270,000 references to dh..." suggesting that the use of DH plays a role in in-group signaling and community cohesion.

DH and related terms are prevalent in a number of Internet subcultures that center female sexuality such as infertility/trying to conceive support groups, egg donation forums, ectopic pregnancy communities, breastfeeding-support communities, and on parenting forums where division of labor between parents of different genders has become an issue, especially after the arrival of a newborn or in times of broader crisis, such as during a global pandemic. DH appears in conversations about family, sexuality and relationships within Muslim, LDS, and Jewish online communities. On one breast cancer forum, where the majority of users are women aged 40 to 60, a statistical analysis of posts shows that typing out "husband" is associated with short-time members, while "my DD" (rather than "daughter") is associated with long-time members.

== Sources ==
- Drentea, Patricia; Moren-Cross, Jennifer L. (28 November 2005). "Social capital and social support on the web: the case of an internet mother site". Sociology of Health & Illness. 27 (7): 920–943. doi:10.1111/j.1467-9566.2005.00464.x. PMID 16313523.
- Hof, Karina (August 2006). "Something you can actually pick up: Scrapbooking as a form and forum of cultural citizenship" (PDF). European Journal of Cultural Studies. 9 (3): 363–384. doi:10.1177/1367549406066078. hdl:2262/52247. S2CID 143519518.
- Nguyen, Dong; Rosé, Carolyn P. (23 June 2011). "Language use as a reflection of socialization in online communities" (PDF). Proceedings of the Workshop on Language in Social Media (LSM 2011). Association for Computational Linguistics. pp. 76–85. ISBN 978-1-932432-96-1.
- Owens, Kim Hensley (2007). Rhetorical labor: writing, childbirth, and the Internet (Ph.D. thesis). University of Illinois at Urbana-Champaign.
