= Engineering validation test =

Testing of prototypes for viability

An engineering verification test (EVT) is performed on first engineering prototypes, to ensure that the basic unit performs to design goals and specifications. Verification ensures that designs meets requirements and specification while validation ensures that created entity meets the user needs and objectives.

== Tests ==
Tests may include:

- Functional test (basic)
- Power measurement
- Signal quality test
- Conformance test
- Electromagnetic interference (EMI) pre-scan
- Thermal and four-corner test
- Basic parametric measurements, specification verification

== Importance ==
Identifying design problems and solving them as early in the design cycle as possible is a key to keeping projects on time and within budget. Too often, product design and performance problems are not detected until late in the product development cycle, when the product is ready to be shipped.

== Prototyping ==
In the prototyping stage, engineers create actual working samples of the product they plan to produce. Engineering verification testing (EVT) is used on prototypes to verify that the design meets pre-determined specifications and design goals. This valuable information is used to validate the design as is, or identify areas that need to be modified.

== Design Verification Test ==
Design Verification Test (DVT) is an intensive testing program which is performed to deliver objective, comprehensive testing verifying all product specifications, interface standards, Original Equipment Manufacturer (OEM) requirements, and diagnostic commands. It consists of the following areas of testing:

- Functional testing (including usability)
- Performance testing
- Climatic testing
- Reliability testing
- Environmental testing
- Mechanical testing
- Mean Time Between Failure (MTBF) prediction
- Conformance testing
- Electromagnetic compatibility (Electromagnetic Compatibility (EMC)) testing and certification
- Safety certification

== Design refinement ==
After prototyping, the product is moved to the next phase of the design cycle: design refinement. Engineers revise and improve the design to meet performance and design requirements and specifications.
