= Digital Chart of the World =

Comprehensive digital map of Earth

The Digital Chart of the World (DCW) is a comprehensive digital map of Earth. It is the most comprehensive geographical information system (GIS) global database that is freely available as of 2006, although it has not been updated since 1992.

== Origin ==
The primary source for this database is the United States Defense Mapping Agency's (DMA) operational navigation chart (ONC) 1:1,000,000 scale paper map series produced by the US, Australia, Canada, and the United Kingdom. These charts were designed to meet the needs of pilots and air crews in medium-and low-altitude en route navigation and to support military operational planning, intelligence briefings, and other needs.

== Data structure ==
The data is divided into 2,094 tiles that represent 5 × 5-degree areas of the globe, except data obtained from Penn State which is broken up by pre-1992 national boundaries, and data from the National Imagery and Mapping Agency (NIMA) which is broken into just five tiles. The data currency varies from place to place, ranging from the mid-1960s to the early 1990s.

The thematic layers of the Digital Chart of the World are:

- Political/ocean (country boundaries)
- Populated places (urbanized areas and points)
- Roads
- Railroads
- Aeronautical structures
- Utilities (electrical, telephone, pipelines)
- Drainage system
- Hypsographic data
- Land cover
- Ocean features
- Physiography
- Cultural landmarks
- Transportation structure
- Vegetation
- Data location

== See also ==
- Vector map (VMAP0 and VMAP1 data)
- Digital elevation model
- Digital terrain model
