= Dauwe =

Dauwe may refer to:

- Johnny Dauwe (1966–2003) Belgian cyclist
- Laurent Dauwe (born 1966) Belgian soccer player
- Phillip Dauwe (born 1983) Dallas Plastic Surgeon

== See also ==
- Douwe
- Dauw
- Douw (disambiguation)
- DAUH
- Dau (disambiguation)
- Daw (disambiguation)
- Doe (disambiguation)
- Doh (disambiguation)
- Dou (disambiguation)
- Dow (disambiguation)
- Duh (disambiguation)
- Dough (disambiguation)
