= 1997–98 UEFA Cup Winners' Cup =

Tournament details
- Dates: 14 August 1997 – 13 May 1998
- Teams: 32 (first round); 47 (qualifying round)

Final positions
- Champions: (England) Chelsea (2nd title)
- Runners-up: (Germany) VfB Stuttgart

Tournament statistics
- Matches played: 91
- Goals scored: 272 (2.99 per match)
- Attendance: 826,944 (9,087 per match)
- Top scorer(s): Pasquale Luiso (Vicenza); 8 goals

The 1997–98 season of the UEFA Cup Winners' Cup club football tournament was won by Chelsea in the final against VfB Stuttgart.

== Teams ==
Location of teams competing in the 1997-98 UEFA Cup Winners' Cup first round.
Yellow: Did not qualify from qualifying round; Red: Qualified for first round.

First round
(Italy) Vicenza	(Spain) Real Betis	(France) Nice	(Germany) VfB Stuttgart
(Netherlands) Roda	(Portugal) Boavista	(England) Chelsea	(Turkey) Kocaelispor
(Greece) AEK	(Austria) Sturm Graz	(Russia) Lokomotiv Moscow	(Belgium) Germinal Ekeren
(Denmark) Copenhagen	(Sweden) AIK	(Norway) Tromsø	(Czech Republic) Slavia Prague
(Switzerland) Luzern			
Qualifying round
(Poland) Legia Warsaw	(Scotland) Kilmarnock	(Romania) Național București	(Croatia) NK Zagreb
(Ukraine) Shakhtar Donetsk	(Cyprus) APOEL	(Israel) Hapoel Be'er Sheva	(Hungary) BVSC
(Georgia (country)) Dinamo Batumi	(Slovakia) Slovan Bratislava	(Latvia) Dinaburg	(Slovenia) Primorje
(Finland) HJK	(Belarus) Belshina Bobruisk	(Iceland) ÍBV	(Bulgaria) Levski Sofia
(North Macedonia) Sloga Jugomagnat	(Lithuania) Žalgiris Vilnius	(Moldova) Zimbru Chișinău	(Northern Ireland) Glenavon
(Liechtenstein) Balzers	(Wales) Cwmbrân Town	(Federal Republic of Yugoslavia) Red Star Belgrade	(Estonia) Tallinna Sadam
(Malta) Hibernians	(Republic of Ireland) Shelbourne	(Armenia) Ararat Yerevan	Union Luxembourg
(Faroe Islands) HB	(Azerbaijan) Kapaz		

== Qualifying round ==
Team 1	Agg.	Team 2	1st leg	2nd leg
HB (Faroe Islands)	1–7	(Cyprus) APOEL	1–1	0–6
Hibernians (Malta)	0–4	(Iceland) ÍBV	0–1	0–3
Glenavon (Northern Ireland)	1–5	(Poland) Legia Warsaw	1–1	0–4
Cwmbrân Town (Wales)	2–12	(Romania) Național București	2–5	0–7
Žalgiris Vilnius (Lithuania)	1–2	(Israel) Hapoel Be'er Sheva	0–0	1–2 (aet)
Zimbru Chișinău (Moldova)	1–4	(Ukraine) Shakhtar Donetsk	1–1	0–3
Dinaburg (Latvia)	2–0	(Azerbaijan) Kapaz	1–0	1–0
Kilmarnock (Scotland)	3–2	(Republic of Ireland) Shelbourne	2–1	1–1
HJK (Finland)	1–3	(Federal Republic of Yugoslavia) Red Star Belgrade	1–0	0–3
Sloga Jugomagnat (North Macedonia)	1–4	(Croatia) NK Zagreb	1–2	0–2
Balzers (Liechtenstein)	1–5	(Hungary) BVSC	1–3	0–2
Tallinna Sadam (Estonia)	2–5	(Belarus) Belshina Bobruisk	1–1	1–4
Primorje (Slovenia)	3–0	Union Luxembourg	2–0	1–0
Levski Sofia (Bulgaria)	2–3	(Slovakia) Slovan Bratislava	1–1	1–2
Dinamo Batumi (Georgia (country))	2–3^{1}	(Armenia) Ararat Yerevan	0–3	2–0

Notes

- Note 1: Ararat Yerevan were awarded a 3–0 win in the qualifying round first leg after Dinamo Batumi were found guilty of fielding an ineligible player — Sologashvili. The match originally ended as a 4–2 win for Dinamo Batumi.

=== First leg ===
13 August 1997
19:00

HB (Faroe Islands)	1–1	(Cyprus) APOEL
Arge 40'	Lineups	Alexandrou 20'

Svangaskarð, Toftir
Attendance: 62
Referee: Oleg Timofejev (Estonia)

14 August 1997
19:30

Hibernians (Malta)	0–1	(Iceland) ÍBV
	Lineups	Guðmundsson 70'

National Stadium, Ta' Qali
Attendance: 631
Referee: Stuart Dougal (Scotland)

14 August 1997
18:00

Glenavon (Northern Ireland)	1–1	(Poland) Legia Warsaw
Grant 59'	Lineups	Sokołowski 33'

Mourneview Park, Lurgan
Attendance: 1,075
Referee: Juan Fernández Marín (Spain)

14 August 1997
19:00

Cwmbrân Town (Wales)	2–5	(Romania) Național București
Parfitt 75' (pen.); Townsend 83'	Lineups	Vasc 31'; Niculescu 47', 61'; Liță 76', 80'

Cwmbran Stadium, Cwmbran
Attendance: 1,800
Referee: Syarhey Shmolik (Belarus)

14 August 1997
18:00

Žalgiris Vilnius (Lithuania)	0–0	(Israel) Hapoel Be'er Sheva
	Lineups

Žalgiris Stadium, Vilnius
Attendance: 2,000
Referee: Morgan Norman (Sweden)

14 August 1997
19:00

Zimbru Chișinău (Moldova)	1–1	(Ukraine) Shakhtar Donetsk
Zghura 72'	Lineups	Atelkin 45'

Stadionul Republican, Chișinău
Attendance: 2,500
Referee: Taras Bezubyak (Russia)

14 August 1997
18:00

Dinaburg (Latvia)	1–0	(Azerbaijan) Kapaz
Tarasovs 36'	Lineups

Celtnieks Stadium, Daugavpils
Attendance: 1,000
Referee: Alan Howells (Wales)

14 August 1997
19:30

Kilmarnock (Scotland)	2–1	(Republic of Ireland) Shelbourne
Wright 66' (pen.), 90'	Lineups	Rutherford 12'

Rugby Park, Kilmarnock
Attendance: 9,041
Referee: Vasyl Melnychuk (Ukraine)

14 August 1997
20:00

HJK (Finland)	1–0	(Federal Republic of Yugoslavia) Red Star Belgrade
P. Helin 58'	Lineups

Olympiastadion, Helsinki
Attendance: 5,140
Referee: Hugh Dallas (Scotland)

14 August 1997
17:00

Sloga Jugomagnat (North Macedonia)	1–2	(Croatia) NK Zagreb
Petkov 60'	Lineups	Bule 65'; Čižmek 90'

Stadion Gradski Park, Skopje
Attendance: 3,000
Referee: Andreas Schluchter (Switzerland)

14 August 1997
18:00

Balzers (Liechtenstein)	1–3	(Hungary) BVSC
Wörnhard 6'	Lineups	M. Telser 50' (o.g.); Á. Füzi 76'; Csordás 84'

Sportplatz Rheinau, Balzers
Attendance: 660
Referee: Ante Kulušić (Croatia)

14 August 1997
18:00

Tallinna Sadam (Estonia)	1–1	(Belarus) Belshina Bobruisk
Olumets 48'	Lineups	Smirnykh 19'

Kadriorg Stadium, Tallinn
Attendance: 332
Referee: Leslie Irvine (Northern Ireland)

14 August 1997
17:30

Primorje (Slovenia)	2–0	Union Luxembourg
Sabadin 37'; Ščulac 85' (pen.)	Lineups

Mestni stadion Ajdovščina, Ajdovščina
Attendance: 1,200
Referee: Roland Beck (Liechtenstein)

14 August 1997
18:00

Levski Sofia (Bulgaria)	1–1	(Slovakia) Slovan Bratislava
G. Ivanov 18'	Lineups	Novák 64'

Vasil Levski National Stadium, Sofia
Attendance: 14,373
Referee: Juan Ansuátegui Roca (Spain)

15 August 1997
18:30

Dinamo Batumi (Georgia (country))	0–3 Awarded^{1}	(Armenia) Ararat Yerevan
Chuhua 23', 31'; Ghlonti 78'; Shekiladze 90'	Lineups	Ter-Petrosyan 59'; Nazaryan 81'

Central Stadium, Batumi
Attendance: 4,500
Referee: Manfred Schüttengruber (Austria)

=== Second leg ===
27 August 1997
18:00

ÍBV (Iceland)	3–0	(Malta) Hibernians
Helgason 22'; Guðmundsson 34', 88' (pen.)	Lineups

Hásteinsvöllur, Vestmannaeyjar
Attendance: 1,400
Referee: Juha Hirviniemi (Finland)

ÍBV won 4–0 on aggregate.

28 August 1997
19:30

APOEL (Cyprus)	6–0	(Faroe Islands) HB
Hörtnagl 15', 21'; Sotiriou 52'; Ioannou 77', 79'; Fasouliotis 81'	Lineups

Makario Stadium, Nicosia
Attendance: 3,498
Referee: Konrad Plautz (Austria)

APOEL won 7–1 on aggregate.

28 August 1997
19:00

Legia Warsaw (Poland)	4–0	(Northern Ireland) Glenavon
Kacprzak 73'; Sokołowski 75', 89' (pen.); Skrzypek 85'	Lineups

Polish Army Stadium, Warsaw
Attendance: 4,000
Referee: Loizos Loizou (Cyprus)

Legia Warsaw won 5–1 on aggregate.

28 August 1997
21:00

Național București (Romania)	7–0	(Wales) Cwmbrân Town
Niculescu 15'; Pigulea 23', 41', 70'; Albeanu 25', 38'; Savu 47'	Lineups

Stadionul Cotroceni, Bucharest
Attendance: 2,500
Referee: Roger Philippi (Luxembourg)

Național București won 12–2 on aggregate.

28 August 1997
19:00

Hapoel Be'er Sheva (Israel)	2–1 (a.e.t.)	(Lithuania) Žalgiris Vilnius
Benayoun 106' (pen.); Bochnik 115'	Lineups	Radžius 96'

Vasermil Stadium, Beersheba
Attendance: 8,700
Referee: Attila Juhos (Hungary)

Hapoel Be'er Sheva won 2–1 on aggregate.

28 August 1997
18:00

Shakhtar Donetsk (Ukraine)	3–0	(Moldova) Zimbru Chișinău
Orbu 28'; Atelkin 44'; Kryventsov 81'	Lineups

Shakhtar Stadium, Donetsk
Attendance: 21,000
Referee: Dan Dragoș Crăciun (Romania)

Shakhtar Donetsk won 4–1 on aggregate.

28 August 1997
17:00

Kapaz (Azerbaijan)	0–1	(Latvia) Dinaburg
	Lineups	Isayev 70'

Ganja City Stadium, Ganja
Attendance: 10,286
Referee: Milan Mitrović (Slovenia)

Dinaburg won 2–0 on aggregate.

28 August 1997
19:45

Shelbourne (Republic of Ireland)	1–1	(Scotland) Kilmarnock
Baker 38'	Lineups	McIntyre 22'

Tolka Park, Dublin
Attendance: 8,100
Referee: Jorge Coroado (Portugal)

Kilmarnock won 3–2 on aggregate.

28 August 1997
20:00

Red Star Belgrade (Federal Republic of Yugoslavia)	3–0	(Finland) HJK
Stanković 6', 25'; Njeguš 90' (pen.)	Lineups

Red Star Stadium, Belgrade
Attendance: 24,375
Referee: Robert Boggi (Italy)

Red Star Belgrade won 3–1 on aggregate.

28 August 1997
16:30

NK Zagreb (Croatia)	2–0	(North Macedonia) Sloga Jugomagnat
Sopić 2'; Bule 7'	Lineups

Stadion Kranjčevićeva, Zagreb
Attendance: 669
Referee: Éric Blareau (Belgium)

NK Zagreb won 4–1 on aggregate.

28 August 1997
19:00

BVSC (Hungary)	2–0	(Liechtenstein) Balzers
Komlósi 12'; Bükszegi 90'	Lineups

Szőnyi úti Stadion, Budapest
Attendance: 1,500
Referee: Richard O'Hanlon (Republic of Ireland)

BVSC won 5–1 on aggregate.

28 August 1997
17:00

Belshina Bobruisk (Belarus)	4–1	(Estonia) Tallinna Sadam
Smirnykh 3'; Timofeyev 58'; Khlebasolaw 74'; Putrash 75'	Lineups	Rõtškov 69' (pen.)

Dinamo Stadium, Minsk
Attendance: 1,365
Referee: Ladislav Gádoši (Slovakia)

Belshina Bobruisk won 5–2 on aggregate.

28 August 1997
20:00

Union Luxembourg	0–1	(Slovenia) Primorje
	Lineups	Rudonja 18'

Stade Achille Hammerel, Luxembourg
Attendance: 400
Referee: Vanco Kocev (Macedonia)

Primorje won 3–0 on aggregate.

28 August 1997
18:00

Slovan Bratislava (Slovakia)	2–1	(Bulgaria) Levski Sofia
Novák 15'; Mužlay 51'	Lineups	Todorov 2'

Tehelné pole, Bratislava
Attendance: 6,800
Referee: Claude Détruche (Switzerland)

Slovan Bratislava won 3–2 on aggregate.

28 August 1997
19:00

Ararat Yerevan (Armenia)	0–2	(Georgia (country)) Dinamo Batumi
	Lineups	Sichinava 2'; M. Makharadze 36'

Hrazdan Stadium, Yerevan
Attendance: 1,700
Referee: Marek Kowalczyk (Poland)

Ararat Yerevan won 3–2 on aggregate.

== First round ==
Team 1	Agg.	Team 2	1st leg	2nd leg
Kocaelispor (Turkey)	3–0	(Romania) Național București	2–0	1–0
APOEL (Cyprus)	0–4	(Austria) Sturm Graz	0–1	0–3
ÍBV (Iceland)	2–5	(Germany) VfB Stuttgart	1–3	1–2
Boavista (Portugal)	3–4	(Ukraine) Shakhtar Donetsk	2–3	1–1
Germinal Ekeren (Belgium)	4–3	(Federal Republic of Yugoslavia) Red Star Belgrade	3–2	1–1
AIK (Sweden)	1–2	(Slovenia) Primorje	0–1	1–1 (aet)
AEK (Greece)	9–2	(Latvia) Dinaburg	5–0	4–2
Slavia Prague (Czech Republic)	6–2	(Switzerland) Luzern	4–2	2–0
Hapoel Be'er Sheva (Israel)	1–14	(Netherlands) Roda	1–4	0–10
NK Zagreb (Croatia)	5–6	(Norway) Tromsø	3–2	2–4 (aet)
Copenhagen (Denmark)	5–0	(Armenia) Ararat Yerevan	3–0	2–0
Belshina Bobruisk (Belarus)	1–5	(Russia) Lokomotiv Moscow	1–2	0–3
Chelsea (England)	4–0	(Slovakia) Slovan Bratislava	2–0	2–0
Nice (France)	4–2	(Scotland) Kilmarnock	3–1	1–1
Real Betis (Spain)	4–0	(Hungary) BVSC	2–0	2–0
Vicenza (Italy)	3–1	(Poland) Legia Warsaw	2–0	1–1

=== First leg ===
18 September 1997
20:30

Kocaelispor (Turkey)	2–0	(Romania) Național București
Albayrak 41'; Moshoeu 44'	Lineups

İzmit İsmetpaşa Stadium, İzmit
Attendance: 5,794
Referee: Claus Bo Larsen (Denmark)

18 September 1997
19:30

APOEL (Cyprus)	0–1	(Austria) Sturm Graz
	Lineups	Spiteri 80'

Makario Stadium, Nicosia
Attendance: 3,700
Referee: Romāns Lajuks (Latvia)

18 September 1997
18:30

ÍBV (Iceland)	1–3	(Germany) VfB Stuttgart
Ólafsson 40'	Lineups	Bobic 9', 12'; Akpoborie 70'

Laugardalsvöllur, Reykjavík
Attendance: 3,148
Referee: John Ashman (Wales)

18 September 1997
21:30

Boavista (Portugal)	2–3	(Ukraine) Shakhtar Donetsk
Rui Miguel 35'; Litos 44'	Lineups	Zubov 29'; Atelkin 60', 63'

Estádio do Bessa, Porto
Attendance: 5,000
Referee: Luc Huyghe (Belgium)

18 September 1997
20:00

Germinal Ekeren (Belgium)	3–2	(Federal Republic of Yugoslavia) Red Star Belgrade
Kovács 17'; Hofmans 57'; Dauwe 70'	Lineups	Ognjenović 60'; Stanković 63'

Veltwijckpark, Antwerp
Attendance: 3,750
Referee: Atanas Uzunov (Bulgaria)

18 September 1997
19:00

AIK (Sweden)	0–1	(Slovenia) Primorje
	Lineups	Rudonja 84'

Råsunda, Solna
Attendance: 4,100
Referee: Vladimír Hriňák (Slovakia)

18 September 1997
18:30

AEK (Greece)	5–0	(Latvia) Dinaburg
Kopitsis 36' (pen.), 45'; Katsavos 64'; Kalitzakis 67'; Marcelo 77'	Lineups

Nikos Goumas Stadium, Athens
Attendance: 10,587
Referee: Hans-Jürgen Weber (Germany)

18 September 1997
20:00

Slavia Prague (Czech Republic)	4–2	(Switzerland) Luzern
Ašanin 4'; Vácha 13'; Vágner 48'; Labant 53'	Lineups	Aleksandrov 6'; Koilov 74'

Stadion Eden, Prague
Attendance: 5,614
Referee: Fiorenzo Treossi (Italy)

18 September 1997
20:30

Hapoel Be'er Sheva (Israel)	1–4	(Netherlands) Roda
Benayoun 63' (pen.)	Lineups	Van Houdt 14', 30'; Torma 23', 34'

Vasermil Stadium, Beersheba
Attendance: 3,240
Referee: Arturo Daudén Ibáñez (Spain)

18 September 1997
16:45

NK Zagreb (Croatia)	3–2	(Norway) Tromsø
Lalić 44'; Sopić 49'; Baturina 50'	Lineups	B. Johansen 56'; Årst 79'

Stadion Kranjčevićeva, Zagreb
Attendance: 569
Referee: Attila Juhos (Hungary)

18 September 1997
19:00

Copenhagen (Denmark)	3–0	(Armenia) Ararat Yerevan
Jónsson 16'; Højer 54'; Tur 89'	Lineups

Parken Stadium, Copenhagen
Attendance: 7,563
Referee: Konrad Plautz (Austria)

18 September 1997
17:00

Belshina Bobruisk (Belarus)	1–2	(Russia) Lokomotiv Moscow
Khlebasolaw 14' (pen.)	Lineups	Loskov 49'; Borodyuk 72'

Dinamo Stadium, Minsk
Attendance: 3,594
Referee: Kostadin Gerginov (Bulgaria)

18 September 1997
19:45

Chelsea (England)	2–0	(Slovakia) Slovan Bratislava
Di Matteo 6'; Granville 80'	Lineups

Stamford Bridge, London
Attendance: 23,067
Referee: Robert Boggi (Italy)

18 September 1997
20:30

Nice (France)	3–1	(Scotland) Kilmarnock
Kohn 13', 48'; Rol 79'	Lineups	Wright 78' (pen.)

Stade du Ray, Nice
Attendance: 10,812
Referee: Oğuz Sarvan (Turkey)

18 September 1997
21:30

Real Betis (Spain)	2–0	(Hungary) BVSC
Alfonso 58', 73'	Lineups

Estadio Manuel Ruiz de Lopera, Seville
Attendance: 5,300
Referee: Dani Koren (Israel)

18 September 1997
20:45

Vicenza (Italy)	2–0	(Poland) Legia Warsaw
Luiso 10'; Ambrosetti 24'	Lineups

Stadio Romeo Menti, Vicenza
Attendance: 10,081
Referee: Hermann Albrecht (Germany)

=== Second leg ===
2 October 1997
20:15

Național București (Romania)	0–1	(Turkey) Kocaelispor
	Lineups	Çolak 79'

Stadionul Cotroceni, Bucharest
Attendance: 8,000
Referee: Stephen Lodge (England)

Kocaelispor won 3–0 on aggregate.

2 October 1997
20:30

Sturm Graz (Austria)	3–0	(Cyprus) APOEL
Reinmayr 3'; Vastić 29'; Haas 43'	Lineups

Arnold-Schwarzenegger-Stadion, Graz
Attendance: 11,500
Referee: Haim Lipkovitz (Israel)

Sturm Graz won 4–0 on aggregate.

2 October 1997
19:15

VfB Stuttgart (Germany)	2–1	(Iceland) ÍBV
Akpoborie 73', 76'	Lineups	Lárusson 79'

Gottlieb-Daimler-Stadion, Stuttgart
Attendance: 12,483
Referee: Marek Kowalczyk (Poland)

Stuttgart won 5–2 on aggregate.

2 October 1997
20:30

Shakhtar Donetsk (Ukraine)	1–1	(Portugal) Boavista
Potskhveria 79'	Lineups	Latapy 89'

Shakhtar Stadium, Donetsk
Attendance: 25,000
Referee: Claude Détruche (Switzerland)

Shakhtar Donetsk won 4–3 on aggregate.

2 October 1997
20:00

Red Star Belgrade (Federal Republic of Yugoslavia)	1–1	(Belgium) Germinal Ekeren
Drulić 18'	Lineups	Radzinski 67'

Red Star Stadium, Belgrade
Attendance: 48,000
Referee: Karol Ihring (Slovakia)

Germinal Ekeren won 4–3 on aggregate.

2 October 1997
15:30

Primorje (Slovenia)	1–1 (a.e.t.)	(Sweden) AIK
Rudonja 105'	Lineups	Novaković 78'

Mestni stadion Ajdovščina, Ajdovščina
Attendance: 1,132
Referee: Sotirios Vorgias (Greece)

Primorje won 2–1 on aggregate.

2 October 1997
21:00

Dinaburg (Latvia)	2–4	(Greece) AEK
Fedotovs 34'; Isayev 62'	Lineups	Nikolaidis 35', 80'; Vlachos 50'; Kostis 72'

Daugava Stadium, Riga
Attendance: 500
Referee: Tom Henning Øvrebø (Norway)

AEK won 9–2 on aggregate.

2 October 1997
20:00

Luzern (Switzerland)	0–2	(Czech Republic) Slavia Prague
	Lineups	Koilov 55' (o.g.); Vágner 74'

Stadion Allmend, Lucerne
Attendance: 5,614
Referee: Mikko Vuorela (Finland)

Slavia Prague won 6–2 on aggregate.

2 October 1997
20:30

Roda (Netherlands)	10–0	(Israel) Hapoel Be'er Sheva
Van Houdt 18', 31', 69'; Lawal 40', 60'; Ooijer 50', 85' (pen.); Vrede 54'; Torma 71', 90'	Lineups

Gemeentelijk Sportpark Kaalheide, Kerkrade
Attendance: 5,010
Referee: Roland Beck (Liechtenstein)

Roda won 14–1 on aggregate.

2 October 1997
20:00

Tromsø (Norway)	4–2 (a.e.t.)	(Croatia) NK Zagreb
Lange 14', 117'; Årst 75'; S. M. Johansen 90'	Lineups	Vukić 54'; Bule 58'

Alfheim Stadion, Tromsø
Attendance: 3,893
Referee: Andreas Schluchter (Switzerland)

Tromsø won 6–5 on aggregate.

2 October 1997
18:00

Ararat Yerevan (Armenia)	0–2	(Denmark) Copenhagen
	Lineups	Mo. Nielsen 87'; Šestan 89'

Hrazdan Stadium, Yerevan
Attendance: 700
Referee: Ladislav Gádoši (Slovakia)

Copenhagen won 5–0 on aggregate.

2 October 1997
19:00

Lokomotiv Moscow (Russia)	3–0	(Belarus) Belshina Bobruisk
Maminov 22'; Kharlachyov 41'; Loskov 74'	Lineups

Lokomotiv Stadium, Moscow
Attendance: 1,500
Referee: Stuart Dougal (Scotland)

Lokomotiv Moscow won 5–1 on aggregate.

2 October 1997
20:35

Slovan Bratislava (Slovakia)	0–2	(England) Chelsea
	Lineups	Vialli 28'; Di Matteo 60'

Tehelné pole, Bratislava
Attendance: 11,003
Referee: Alain Hamer (Luxembourg)

Chelsea won 4–0 on aggregate.

2 October 1997
19:30

Kilmarnock (Scotland)	1–1	(France) Nice
Reilly 32'	Lineups	Milinković 76'

Rugby Park, Kilmarnock
Attendance: 8,402
Referee: Juha Hirviniemi (Finland)

Nice won 4–2 on aggregate.

2 October 1997
20:30

BVSC (Hungary)	0–2	(Spain) Real Betis
	Lineups	Alexis 7'; Alfonso 49'

Szőnyi úti Stadion, Budapest
Attendance: 1,200
Referee: Kazimir Znaydzinski (Belarus)

Real Betis won 4–0 on aggregate.

2 October 1997
20:45

Legia Warsaw (Poland)	1–1	(Italy) Vicenza
Kacprzak 57'	Lineups	Zauli 86'

Polish Army Stadium, Warsaw
Attendance: 4,022
Referee: Milan Mitrović (Slovenia)

Vicenza won 3–1 on aggregate.

== Second round ==
Team 1	Agg.	Team 2	1st leg	2nd leg
Tromsø (Norway)	4–9	(England) Chelsea	3–2	1–7
Germinal Ekeren (Belgium)	4–6	(Germany) VfB Stuttgart	0–4	4–2
Lokomotiv Moscow (Russia)	2–1	(Turkey) Kocaelispor	2–1	0–0
Shakhtar Donetsk (Ukraine)	2–5	(Italy) Vicenza	1–3	1–2
Real Betis (Spain)	3–1	(Denmark) Copenhagen	2–0	1–1
AEK (Greece)	2–1	(Austria) Sturm Graz	2–0	0–1
Nice (France)	3–3 (a)	(Czech Republic) Slavia Prague	2–2	1–1
Primorje (Slovenia)	0–6	(Netherlands) Roda	0–2	0–4

=== First leg ===
23 October 1997
21:05

Tromsø (Norway)	3–2	(England) Chelsea
S. Nilsen 6'; Fermann 19'; Årst 86'	Lineups	Vialli 85', 89'

Alfheim Stadion, Tromsø
Attendance: 6,438
Referee: Jacek Granat (Poland)

23 October 1997
20:30

Germinal Ekeren (Belgium)	0–4	(Germany) VfB Stuttgart
	Lineups	Bobic 43', 61'; Akpoborie 55', 75'

Veltwijckpark, Antwerp
Attendance: 2,704
Referee: Knud Erik Fisker (Denmark)

23 October 1997
19:00

Lokomotiv Moscow (Russia)	2–1	(Turkey) Kocaelispor
Kharlachyov 33'; Janashia 82'	Lineups	Uzun 73'

Lokomotiv Stadium, Moscow
Attendance: 3,500
Referee: Georg Dardenne (Germany)

23 October 1997
21:00

Shakhtar Donetsk (Ukraine)	1–3	(Italy) Vicenza
Zubov 63'	Lineups	Luiso 1', 90'; Beghetto 55'

Shakhtar Stadium, Donetsk
Attendance: 15,286
Referee: Pascal Garibian (France)

23 October 1997
21:30

Real Betis (Spain)	2–0	(Denmark) Copenhagen
Oli 25'; Cañas 39'	Lineups

Estadio Manuel Ruiz de Lopera, Seville
Attendance: 7,800
Referee: Leslie Irvine (Northern Ireland)

23 October 1997
20:00

AEK (Greece)	2–0	(Austria) Sturm Graz
Batista 75'; Marcelo 84'	Lineups

Nikos Goumas Stadium, Athens
Attendance: 13,329
Referee: Alfredo Trentalange (Italy)

23 October 1997
20:30

Nice (France)	2–2	(Czech Republic) Slavia Prague
Aulanier 6' (pen.), 77'	Lineups	Vácha 14', 35'

Stade du Ray, Nice
Attendance: 14,274
Referee: Celino Gracia Redondo (Spain)

23 October 1997
20:30

Primorje (Slovenia)	0–2	(Netherlands) Roda
	Lineups	Lawal 15'; Van Houdt 67'

Stadion Bežigrad, Ljubljana
Attendance: 984
Referee: Metin Tokat (Turkey)

=== Second leg ===
6 November 1997
19:45

Chelsea (England)	7–1	(Norway) Tromsø
Petrescu 12', 85'; Vialli 24', 60', 75'; Zola 43'; Lebœuf 54' (pen.)	Lineups	B. Johansen 39'

Stamford Bridge, London
Attendance: 29,363
Referee: Vasyl Melnychuk (Ukraine)

Chelsea won 9–4 on aggregate.

6 November 1997
20:30

VfB Stuttgart (Germany)	2–4	(Belgium) Germinal Ekeren
Verlaat 12'; Poschner 34'	Lineups	Van Ankeren 43', 82'; Van Geneugden 45'; Karagiannis 72'

Gottlieb-Daimler-Stadion, Stuttgart
Attendance: 10,800
Referee: Pierluigi Pairetto (Italy)

Stuttgart won 6–4 on aggregate.

6 November 1997
20:00

Kocaelispor (Turkey)	0–0	(Russia) Lokomotiv Moscow
	Lineups

İzmit İsmetpaşa Stadium, İzmit
Attendance: 12,000
Referee: Fernand Meese (Belgium)

Lokomotiv Moscow won 2–1 on aggregate.

6 November 1997
20:45

Vicenza (Italy)	2–1	(Ukraine) Shakhtar Donetsk
Luiso 24'; Viviani 70'	Lineups	Atelkin 59'

Stadio Romeo Menti, Vicenza
Attendance: 9,500
Referee: Roy Helge Olsen (Norway)

Vicenza won 5–2 on aggregate.

6 November 1997
19:00

Copenhagen (Denmark)	1–1	(Spain) Real Betis
P. Nielsen 60' (pen.)	Lineups	Ureña 80'

Parken Stadium, Copenhagen
Attendance: 10,140
Referee: Willie Young (Scotland)

Real Betis won 3–1 on aggregate.

6 November 1997
21:00

Sturm Graz (Austria)	1–0	(Greece) AEK
Spiteri 82'	Lineups

Arnold-Schwarzenegger-Stadion, Graz
Attendance: 15,400
Referee: Atanas Uzunov (Bulgaria)

AEK won 2–1 on aggregate.

6 November 1997
20:30

Slavia Prague (Czech Republic)	1–1	(France) Nice
Labant 80'	Lineups	Vandecasteele 74'

Stadion Eden, Prague
Attendance: 7,312
Referee: Lutz Michael Fröhlich (Germany)

3–3 on aggregate. Slavia Prague won on away goals.

6 November 1997
20:30

Roda (Netherlands)	4–0	(Slovenia) Primorje
Van der Luer 44'; Peeters 49'; Zafarin 74'; Valgaeren 84'	Lineups

Gemeentelijk Sportpark Kaalheide, Kerkrade
Attendance: 8,000
Referee: Lucílio Batista (Portugal)

Roda won 6–0 on aggregate.

== Quarter-finals ==
Team 1	Agg.	Team 2	1st leg	2nd leg
Roda (Netherlands)	1–9	(Italy) Vicenza	1–4	0–5
Slavia Prague (Czech Republic)	1–3	(Germany) VfB Stuttgart	1–1	0–2
AEK (Greece)	1–2	(Russia) Lokomotiv Moscow	0–0	1–2
Real Betis (Spain)	2–5	(England) Chelsea	1–2	1–3

=== First leg ===
5 March 1998
20:45

Roda (Netherlands)	1–4	(Italy) Vicenza
Peeters 73'	Lineups	Luiso 17', 40'; Belotti 29'; Otero 67'

Gemeentelijk Sportpark Kaalheide, Kerkrade
Attendance: 14,000
Referee: Václav Krondl (Czech Republic)

5 March 1998
20:45

Slavia Prague (Czech Republic)	1–1	(Germany) VfB Stuttgart
Vácha 39'	Lineups	Poschner 51'

Stadion Evžena Rošického, Prague
Attendance: 8,712
Referee: Rune Pedersen (Norway)

5 March 1998
20:00

AEK Athens (Greece)	0–0	(Russia) Lokomotiv Moscow
	Lineups

Nikos Goumas Stadium, Athens
Attendance: 24,367
Referee: Dick Jol (Netherlands)

5 March 1998
21:30

Real Betis (Spain)	1–2	(England) Chelsea
Alfonso 46'	Lineups	Flo 7', 12'

Estadio Manuel Ruiz de Lopera, Seville
Attendance: 19,300
Referee: Atanas Uzunov (Bulgaria)

=== Second leg ===
19 March 1998
20:45

Vicenza (Italy)	5–0	(Netherlands) Roda
Luiso 4'; Firmani 24'; Méndez 38'; Ambrosetti 42'; Zauli 47'	Lineups

Stadio Romeo Menti, Vicenza
Attendance: 14,362
Referee: Hugh Dallas (Scotland)

Vicenza won 9–1 on aggregate.

19 March 1998
20:30

VfB Stuttgart (Germany)	2–0	(Czech Republic) Slavia Prague
Balakov 9', 88'	Lineups

Gottlieb-Daimler-Stadion, Stuttgart
Attendance: 18,921
Referee: José María García-Aranda (Spain)

Stuttgart won 3–1 on aggregate.

19 March 1998
19:00

Lokomotiv Moscow (Russia)	2–1	(Greece) AEK Athens
Kharlachyov 53'; Chugainov 90'	Lineups	Kopitsis 67' (pen.)

Lokomotiv Stadium, Moscow
Attendance: 11,256
Referee: Markus Merk (Germany)

Lokomotiv Moscow won 2–1 on aggregate.

19 March 1998
19:45

Chelsea (England)	3–1	(Spain) Real Betis
Sinclair 30'; Di Matteo 50'; Zola 90'	Lineups	George 20'

Stamford Bridge, London
Attendance: 32,300
Referee: Bernd Heynemann (Germany)

Chelsea won 5–2 on aggregate.

== Semi-finals ==
Team 1	Agg.	Team 2	1st leg	2nd leg
Vicenza (Italy)	2–3	(England) Chelsea	1–0	1–3
VfB Stuttgart (Germany)	3–1	(Russia) Lokomotiv Moscow	2–1	1–0

=== First leg ===
2 April 1998
20:45

Vicenza (Italy)	1–0	(England) Chelsea
Zauli 16'	Lineups

Stadio Romeo Menti, Vicenza
Attendance: 19,319
Referee: Manuel Díaz Vega (Spain)

2 April 1998
20:30

VfB Stuttgart (Germany)	2–1	(Russia) Lokomotiv Moscow
Akpoborie 42'; Bobic 90'	Lineups	Janashia 22'

Gottlieb-Daimler-Stadion, Stuttgart
Attendance: 14,416
Referee: Vítor Melo Pereira (Portugal)

=== Second leg ===
16 April 1998
19:45

Chelsea (England)	3–1	(Italy) Vicenza
Poyet 34'; Zola 50'; M. Hughes 76'	Lineups	Luiso 32'

Stamford Bridge, London
Attendance: 33,810
Referee: Marc Batta (France)

Chelsea won 3–2 on aggregate.

16 April 1998
20:15

Lokomotiv Moscow (Russia)	0–1	(Germany) VfB Stuttgart
	Lineups	Bobic 24'

Lokomotiv Stadium, Moscow
Attendance: 18,650
Referee: Kim Milton Nielsen (Denmark)

Stuttgart won 3–1 on aggregate.

== Final ==
13 May 1998
20:45

Chelsea (England)	1–0	(Germany) VfB Stuttgart
Zola 71'	Lineups

Råsunda Stadium, Stockholm
Attendance: 30,216
Referee: Stefano Braschi (Italy)

== Top goalscorers ==
The top goalscorers from the 1997–98 UEFA Cup Winners' Cup are as follows:

Rank	Name	Team	Goals
1	(Italy) Pasquale Luiso	(Italy) Vicenza	8
2	(Nigeria) Jonathan Akpoborie	(Germany) VfB Stuttgart	6
2	(Germany) Fredi Bobic	(Germany) VfB Stuttgart	6
2	(Belgium) Peter Van Houdt	(Netherlands) Roda	6
2	(Italy) Gianluca Vialli	(England) Chelsea	6
6	(Ukraine) Serhiy Atelkin	(Ukraine) Shakhtar Donetsk	5
7	(Spain) Alfonso	(Spain) Real Betis	4
7	(Hungary) Gábor Torma	(Netherlands) Roda	4
7	(Czech Republic) Karel Vácha	(Czech Republic) Slavia Prague	4
7	(Italy) Gianfranco Zola	(England) Chelsea	4

== See also ==
- 1997–98 UEFA Champions League
- 1997–98 UEFA Cup
- 1997 UEFA Intertoto Cup
