= Dough (disambiguation) =

Dough is a thick paste, usually used to make an edible foodstuff.

Dough may also refer to:

- slang for money
- Dough (film), a 2015 British-Hungarian film
- "Dough", a 1995 TV episode of the UK TV sitcom Bottom
- John Dough, a fictional character created by Frank L. Baum
- Jon Dough (1962–2006), U.S. pornographic actor
- van Dough family, a fictional family from Richie Rich
- an alternate spelling of the yogurt beverage doogh or dogh, also known as ayran

== See also ==
- Category:Doughs
- Doughboy (disambiguation)
- Dougher, a surname
- Philippe "Dough Man" Dauman (born 1954), U.S. businessman
- Dauwe
- Dauw
- DAUH
- Douw (disambiguation)
- Douwe
- Dau (disambiguation)
- Daw (disambiguation)
- Doe (disambiguation)
- Doh (disambiguation)
- Dou (disambiguation)
- Dow (disambiguation)
- Duh (disambiguation)
