= Douw =

Douw may refer to:

- Douw Calitz (born 1974), South African lawn bowls player
- Douw Steyn (1952–2025), South African businessman
- De Peyster Douw Brown (1915–1991), U.S. fighter pilot
- William Douw Lighthall (1857–1954), Canadian lawyer
- Deborah Matilda Douw (1835–1911), U.S. missionary to China
- Gerard Douw (1613–1675), Dutch painter
- Marthen Douw (born 1980), Papuan politician
- Simon Johannes van Douw (born 1639), Flemish painter
- Volkert P. Douw (1720–1801), U.S. merchant

== See also ==
- Douwe
- Dauw
- DAUH
- Dau (disambiguation)
- Daw (disambiguation)
- Doe (disambiguation)
- Doh (disambiguation)
- Dou (disambiguation)
- Dow (disambiguation)
- Duh (disambiguation)
