= DUR =

DUR or Dur may refer to:

- King Shaka International Airport, an airport north of Durban with IATA code DUR
- County Durham, a county in England with ISO 3166-2:GB code DUR
- Detroit United Railway, an interurban railway in southeast Michigan
- Drug Utilization Review, a review of a drug to determine effectiveness, potential dangers, problems with drug interaction, and other issues
- Dur, Iran (disambiguation)
- Durrington-on-Sea railway station, a railway station in Worthing, West Sussex with National Rail station code DUR
- The inscription on stop signs in Turkey

== See also ==
- Dir (disambiguation)
- Dirr (disambiguation)
- Durr (disambiguation)
- Duerr (disambiguation)
