= Dows =

Dows may refer to:

== Places ==
- Dows, Iowa, USA; a city
  - Dows Community School District, a former district that was merged away
    - Clarion–Goldfield–Dows Community School District, that was the result of a merger with Dows
  - Burlington, Cedar Rapids & Northern Passenger Depot-Dows, the Dows train station on the Burlington, Cedar Rapids & Northern railroad
- Dows Street Historic District, Ely, Iowa, USA
- Dows Township, Cass County, North Dakota, USA

== People ==
- Dows (surname), and list of people with that name
- Dows Dunham (1890–1984), U.S. egyptologist

== Other uses ==
- Downhole oil–water separation technology (DOWS)

== See also ==
- Dows Creek, Mackay, Queensland, Australia
- David Dows (schooner), a ship
- Davenport v. Dows; a U.S. corporate law case
- Dow (disambiguation) for the singular of DOWs
