= 2001–02 OGC Nice season =

Nice
2001–02 season
- Manager: Sandro Salvioni
- Stadium: Stade du Ray
- French Division 2: 3rd (promoted)
- Coupe de France: Round of 64
- Coupe de la Ligue: First round

The 2001–02 season was the 98th season in the existence of OGC Nice and the club's third consecutive season in the second division of French football. In addition to the domestic league, OGC Nice competed in this season's edition of the Coupe de France and Coupe de la Ligue. The season covered the period from 1 July 2001 to 30 June 2002.

== Players ==
=== First-team squad ===
Note: Flags indicate national team as defined under FIFA eligibility rules; some limited exceptions apply. Players may hold more than one non-FIFA nationality.

| No. | Pos. | Nation | Player |
|---|---|---|---|
| — | GK | FRA | Hilaire Munoz |
| — | GK | FRA | Bruno Valencony |
| — | GK | GUI | Abdallah Bah |
| — | GK | FRA | Jean-Daniel Padovani |
| — | DF | FRA | Jean-Charles Cirilli |
| — | DF | CIV | Didier Angan |
| — | DF | FRA | Cédric Varrault |
| — | DF | GUI | Abdoulaye Soumah |
| — | DF | FRA | Noé Pamarot |
| — | DF | FRA | Kelly Berville |
| — | DF | FRA | José Cobos |
| — | DF | FRA | Thibault Scotto |
| — | DF | FRA | Patrice Evra |
| — | MF | FRA | Romain Pitau |

| No. | Pos. | Nation | Player |
|---|---|---|---|
| — | MF | ESP | Juan Carlos Carcedo |
| — | MF | ALG | Madjid Ben Haddou |
| — | MF | FRA | Dominique Aulanier |
| — | MF | FRA | Manuel Nogueira |
| — | MF | FRA | Janick Tamazout |
| — | MF | ITA | Fabio Cinetti |
| — | MF | ARG | Pablo Rodríguez |
| — | FW | FRA | Laurent Gagnier |
| — | FW | FRA | Christophe Meslin |
| — | FW | MTQ | Johan Audel |
| — | FW | ALG | Abdelmalek Cherrad |
| — | FW | FRA | Serge Ayeli |
| — | FW | SEN | Kaba Amadou Mané |

== Pre-season and friendlies ==
Win Draw Loss Fixtures

| 13 May 2002 Friendly | Nice (France) | 0–2 | (France) Paris Saint-Germain | Nice, France |
| | | | | Stadium: Stade du Ray |

== Competitions ==
=== Overall record ===
| Competition | First match | Last match | Starting round | Final position | Record | | | | | | | |
| Competition | First match | Last match | Starting round | Final position | Pld | W | D | L | GF | GA | GD | Win % |
|---|---|---|---|---|---|---|---|---|---|---|---|---|
| Division 2 | 28 July 2001 | 3 May 2002 | Matchday 1 | 3rd | 38 | 20 | 6 | 12 | 56 | 40 | +16 | 52.63 |
| Coupe de France | November 2001 | TBD | Seventh round | Round of 64 | 3 | 1 | 2 | 0 | 4 | 1 | +3 | 33.33 |
| Coupe de la Ligue | September 2001 | TBD | First round | First round | 1 | 0 | 0 | 1 | 1 | 2 | −1 | 0.00 |
| Total | | | | | 42 | 21 | 8 | 13 | 61 | 43 | +18 | 50.00 |

Source: Competitions

=== French Division 2 ===
==== League table ====
| Pos | Team | Pld | W | D | L | GF | GA | GD | Pts | Promotion or Relegation |
|---|---|---|---|---|---|---|---|---|---|---|
| 1 | Ajaccio (C, P) | 38 | 20 | 12 | 6 | 47 | 25 | +22 | 72 | Promotion to Ligue 1 |
| 2 | Strasbourg (P) | 38 | 19 | 11 | 8 | 47 | 27 | +20 | 68 | Promotion to Ligue 1 |
| 3 | Nice (P) | 38 | 20 | 6 | 12 | 56 | 40 | +16 | 66 | Promotion to Ligue 1 |
| 4 | Le Havre (P) | 38 | 17 | 14 | 7 | 56 | 32 | +24 | 65 | Promotion to Ligue 1 |
| 5 | Le Mans | 38 | 16 | 10 | 12 | 48 | 41 | +7 | 58 | |

Source: Ligue 2
(C) Champions; (P) Promoted

==== Results summary ====
| Overall | | | | | | | | Home | | | | | | Away | | | | | |
| Pld | W | D | L | GF | GA | GD | Pts | W | D | L | GF | GA | GD | W | D | L | GF | GA | GD |
|---|---|---|---|---|---|---|---|---|---|---|---|---|---|---|---|---|---|---|---|
| 38 | 20 | 6 | 12 | 56 | 40 | +16 | 66 | 15 | 1 | 3 | 38 | 15 | +23 | 5 | 5 | 9 | 18 | 25 | −7 |

Source: Ligue 2

==== Results by round ====
| Round | 1 | 2 | 3 | 4 | 5 | 6 | 7 | 8 | 9 | 10 | 11 | 12 | 13 | 14 | 15 | 16 | 17 | 18 | 19 | 20 | 21 | 22 | 23 | 24 | 25 | 26 | 27 | 28 | 29 | 30 | 31 | 32 | 33 | 34 | 35 | 36 | 37 | 38 |
|---|---|---|---|---|---|---|---|---|---|---|---|---|---|---|---|---|---|---|---|---|---|---|---|---|---|---|---|---|---|---|---|---|---|---|---|---|---|---|
| Ground | H | A | H | A | H | A | H | A | H | A | H | A | H | A | H | A | H | A | A | H | A | H | A | H | A | H | A | H | A | H | A | H | A | H | A | H | H | A |
| Result | W | L | W | L | W | L | L | L | D | W | W | L | W | D | W | L | L | D | W | W | W | L | L | W | L | W | D | W | W | W | D | W | L | W | D | W | W | W |
| Position | 6 | 11 | 5 | 9 | 5 | 9 | 10 | 11 | 12 | 9 | 7 | 10 | 8 | 8 | 7 | 9 | 10 | 9 | 7 | 5 | 5 | 6 | 7 | 5 | 6 | 5 | 6 | 6 | 5 | 5 | 5 | 5 | 5 | 4 | 4 | 4 | 4 | 3 |

Source: Ligue 2
A = Away; H = Home; W = Win; D = Draw; L = Loss

== Statistics ==
=== Squad statistics ===
| No. | Pos | Nat | Player | Total | | Division 2 | | Coupe de France | | Coupe de la Ligue | | | |
| No. | Pos | Nat | Player | Apps | Goals | Apps | Goals | Apps | Goals | Apps | Goals | | |
Goalkeepers
| 1 | GK | (France) FRA | [[]] | 0 | 0 | 0 | 0 | 0 | 0 | 0 | 0 | 0 | 0 |
| 1 | GK | (France) FRA | [[]] | 0 | 0 | 0 | 0 | 0 | 0 | 0 | 0 | 0 | 0 |
Defenders
| 1 | DF | (France) FRA | [[]] | 0 | 0 | 0 | 0 | 0 | 0 | 0 | 0 | 0 | 0 |
| 1 | DF | (France) FRA | [[]] | 0 | 0 | 0 | 0 | 0 | 0 | 0 | 0 | 0 | 0 |
Midfielders
| 1 | MF | (France) FRA | [[]] | 0 | 0 | 0 | 0 | 0 | 0 | 0 | 0 | 0 | 0 |
| 1 | MF | (France) FRA | [[]] | 0 | 0 | 0 | 0 | 0 | 0 | 0 | 0 | 0 | 0 |
Forwards
| 1 | FW | (France) FRA | [[]] | 0 | 0 | 0 | 0 | 0 | 0 | 0 | 0 | 0 | 0 |
| 1 | FW | (France) FRA | [[]] | 0 | 0 | 0 | 0 | 0 | 0 | 0 | 0 | 0 | 0 |
Players who have made an appearance or had a squad number this season but have left the club
| 1 | GK | (France) FRA | [[]] | 0 | 0 | 0 | 0 | 0 | 0 | 0 | 0 | 0 | 0 |

=== Goalscorers ===
| Rank | No. | Pos | Nat | Name | Division 2 | Coupe de France | Coupe de la Ligue | Total | |
|---|---|---|---|---|---|---|---|---|---|
| 1 | 1 | FW | (France) | [[]] | 0 | 0 | 0 | 0 | |
| 2 | 2 | MF | (France) | [[]] | 0 | 0 | 0 | 0 | |
| 2 | Totals | | | | | 0 | 0 | 0 | 0 |
