= 1997 Trophée des Champions =

- Event: Trophée des Champions
Monaco	Nice
5	2
- Date: 23 July 1997
- Venue: Stade de la Méditerranée, Béziers, France
- Referee: Jean-Claude Puyalt
- Attendance: 7,614

The 1997 Trophée des Champions was a football match held at Stade de la Méditerranée, Béziers on 23 July 1997 that saw 1996–97 Division 1 champions AS Monaco FC defeat 1996–97 Coupe de France winners OGC Nice 5–2.

== Match details ==
23 July 1997
21:00 CET

Monaco	5–2	Nice
Lefèvre 3'; N'Doram 15' 17'; Ikpeba 33'; Trezeguet 76'	Report	Debbah 69'; Vignola 90'

Stade de la Méditerranée, Béziers
Attendance: 7,614
Referee: Jean-Claude Puyalt

MONACO:
GK	(France) Fabien Barthez (c)
RB	(France) Willy Sagnol
CB	(France) Lilian Martin
CB	(France) Djibril Diawara	(substituted off) 6'
LB	(France) Christophe Pignol	(substituted off) 73'
MF	(Senegal) Salif Diao
MF	(Algeria) Ali Benarbia
MF	(France) Stéphane Carnot
MF	(France) Fabien Lefèvre
FW	(Chad) Japhet N'Doram	(substituted off) 62'
FW	(Nigeria) Victor Ikpeba
Substitutes:
DF	(Belgium) Philippe Léonard	(substituted on) 73'
MF	(Portugal) Costinha	(substituted on) 6'
FW	(France) David Trezeguet	(substituted on) 62'
Manager:
(France) Jean Tigana

NICE:
GK	(France) Robin Huc
DF	(France) Mickaël Rol
DF	(Austria) Goran Kartalija
DF	(France) Ludovic Stefano
DF	(France) Frédéric Martin (c)
MF	(France) Franck Pottier	(substituted off) 80'
MF	(Federal Republic of Yugoslavia) Zoran Milinković
MF	(France) Dominique Aulanier
MF	(France) Franco Vignola
FW	(France) Franck Vandecasteele
FW	(Liberia) James Debbah
Substitutes:
MF	(France) Thibault Scotto	(substituted on) 80'
Manager:
(Federal Republic of Yugoslavia) Silvester Takač

== See also ==
- 1997–98 French Division 1
- 1997–98 Coupe de France
