= Dir =

Dir, dir, or DIR may refer to:

== Acronyms ==
- De Imperatoribus Romanis, an online biographical encyclopedia of the Roman emperors from 27 BC to 1453 AD
- Detroit International Riverfront, an area of Detroit, Michigan in the United States
- Developmental, Individual differences, Relationship-based approach, a developmental intervention to autism
- Digitally Imported Radio, an internet radio station
- Digital Instrumentation Recorder, a magnetic tape format by Sony
- Doing It Right, a methodology for scuba diving
- Double inversion recovery, an MRI sequence

== In computing ==
- An abbreviation for directory (file systems)
- dir (command), a shell command
- directory (OpenVMS command), an operating system command
- <dir>...</dir>, an HTML element

== Places and areas ==
- Dir (city), a town in the Khyber Pakhtunkhwa province of Pakistan
- Dir (union council), an administrative unit in the Khyber Pakhtunkhwa province of Pakistan
- Dir (princely state), a former princely state in the North-West Frontier Province, incorporated into Pakistan in 1969
- Dir District in the North West Frontier Province, split into two districts in 1996

== Government ==
- Australian Government Department of Industrial Relations (1978–1982)
- Australian Government Department of Industrial Relations (1987–1997)
- California Department of Industrial Relations
- Texas Department of Information Resources

== People ==
- Dir (clan), one of the five major Somali clans
- Askold and Dir, Viking rulers of Kiev

== See also ==
- Dirr (disambiguation)
- Durr (disambiguation)
- Duerr (disambiguation)
