= Duty (disambiguation) =

Duty is a philosophical and legal concept.

Duty may also refer to:

== Places ==
- Duty (village), a village in Zabaykalsky Krai, Russia
- Duty, Virginia, a community in the United States

== People with the surname ==
- John David Duty (1952–2010), American who was executed in Oklahoma for first-degree murder
- Kenton Duty (born 1995), American actor, singer, and dancer
- Margie Duty (1922–2001), African American law enforcement officer

== Arts, entertainment, and media ==
- Duty (1986 film) a 1986 Bollywood Hindi Indian Film Directed By Ravikant Nagaich
- Duty (album), a 2000 album by Ayumi Hamasaki
- Duty (film), a 2003 British television film part of the Hornblower series
- "Duty" (short story), a short story by Frederick Forsyth

== Business ==
- Duty (tax), a form of taxation
  - Air Passenger Duty, an excise duty in the United Kingdom
  - Duty-free permit, a permit that allows its holder to import a vehicle in Sri Lanka on duty concessions
  - Duty-free shop, retail outlets that are exempt from the payment of certain local or national taxes and duties
  - Stamp duty, a form of tax on documents
  - Succession duty, an inheritance tax levied in the English fiscal system
  - Vehicle Excise Duty, an excise duty on a vehicle in the United Kingdom, known as road tax or tax disc
- Duty § Duties of employment

== Law ==
- Duty § Legal duties
  - Duty (criminal law), an obligation to act
  - Duty of care, in tort law
  - Duty of care (business associations), obligation owed to a corporation by its directors
  - Duty of disclosure, an obligation to reveal certain information

== Other uses ==
- Active duty, a military concept in the United States
- Vehicle duty, terminology for classifying vehicles according to gross vehicle weight rating; see truck classification

== See also ==
- Duty cycle, the fraction of one period in which a signal or system is active
- Jury duty (disambiguation)
- Heavy duty (disambiguation)
- HD (disambiguation)
