= Dürr =

Dürris a German surname derived from a nickname for a lean person (from Middle High German dürre 'dry', 'lean'). Notable people with the surname include:

- Alfred Dürr (1918–2011), German musicologist
- Christian Dürr (born 1977), German politician
- Emil Dürr (1920–1944), Unterscharführer
- Françoise Dürr (born 1942), French tennis player
- Hans-Peter Dürr (1929–2014), German physicist
- Heinz Dürr (born 1933), German entrepreneur
- Johannes Dürr (born 1987), Austrian cross-country skier
- Lena Dürr (born 1991), German alpine skier, daughter of Peter Dürr
- Ludwig Dürr (1878–1956), German airship designer
- Peter Dürr (born 1960), German alpine skier
- Renate Dürr, (born 1961), German academic
- Richard Dürr (1938–2014), Swiss footballer
- Thomas D (Thomas Dürr, born 1968), rapper in the German hip hop group Die Fantastischen Vier
- Thomas Dürr (bobsledder) (born 1978), bobsledder from Liechtenstein
- Walther Dürr (1932–2018), German musicologist
- Wilhelm Dürr the Younger (1857–1900), German painter and draughtsman

== See also ==
- Duerr (disambiguation)
- Durr (disambiguation)
