= Durr =

Durr is a surname which may refer to:

- Asia Durr (born 1997), American basketball player
- Clifford Durr (1899–1975), American civil rights lawyer
- Edward Durr (born 1963), American politician from New Jersey
- Frankie Durr (1925–2000), English jockey
- Jason Durr (born 1967), British actor
- John Durr (1930–2010), South African swimmer
- Kent Durr (born 1941), South African politician
- Kevin Durr (born 1991), American soccer player
- Marlese Durr, American sociologist and professor
- Raymond Durr (1901–?), French wrestler
- Virginia Foster Durr, a former American civil rights activist

== See also ==
- Shajar al-Durr (died 1257), ruler of Egypt
- Dürr, a list of people with the surname
- Dürr Group, a global mechanical and plant engineering firm based in Stuttgart, Germany
- Durrr Burger, a character from the 2017 video game Fortnite
- Tom Dwan, professional poker player is also known (especially online) by the nickname "durrrr"
- Durrr (disambiguation)
- Duerr (disambiguation)
- Dur (disambiguation)
- Dirr (disambiguation)
- Dir (disambiguation)
