= Tour of duty (disambiguation) =

In the military, a tour of duty is a period of operational time.

== Art, entertainment, and media ==
=== Comics ===
- "Tour of Duty" (Judge Dredd story), a story in the Judge Dredd comic

=== Music ===
- Tour of Duty – Concert for the Troops, a 1999 concert in Dili for the Australian troops serving with INTERFET
- The Tour of Duty EP, 2011 compilation album by Hichkas

=== Television ===
- Andy McNab's Tour of Duty, a 2008 British documentary series
- Tour of Duty (TV series), an American drama series
- Tour of Duty, better known as Breach of Conduct, an American TV film

== Others ==
- Tour of Duty (India), tour of duty in the Indian Army

== See also ==
- Duty (disambiguation)
- Tour (disambiguation)
