= Heavy Duty =

Heavy Duty may refer to:

== Characters ==
- Heavy Duty (G.I. Joe), a fictional character in the G.I. Joe universe
- Heavy Duty or Heavy Load (Transformers), a character in the fictional Transformers universe

== Other uses ==
- Heavy duty truck, a vehicle type
- Heavy duty pickup truck, a vehicle type
- Heavy duty battery, a version of zinc–carbon battery
- Heavy Duty (album), a 1997 album by Xtatik
- "Heavy Duty", a song from the soundtrack album This Is Spinal Tap
- Heavy Duty (music), a music publishing and production house

== See also ==
- HD (disambiguation)
- Heavy (disambiguation)
- Duty (disambiguation)
- Heavy Load (disambiguation)
