= Dows (surname) =

Dows (/daʊs/) is a surname. Notable people with the surname include:

== Notable people ==
- Alice Olin Dows (1881–1963) American socialite and poet
- David Dows III (1885–1966) American politician
- Carmen Vial Freire Dows (1904–1978) Chilean diplomat
- Olin Dows (1904–1981) American artist
- William Greene Dows (1864–1926), Railroad executive and namesake of Dows, Iowa, USA

== Other ==
- Mr. Dows, the plaintiff in the Davenport v. Dows U.S. Supreme Court case (1873)

== See also ==
- Dow (surname)
- Dowe (disambiguation)
- Dows (disambiguation)
