= Dowr =

Dowr or Dur (Persian: دور) may refer to:

- Dowr, Isfahan
- Dowr, Chabahar, Sistan and Baluchestan Province
- Dowr, Konarak, Sistan and Baluchestan Province
