= Dowe =

Dowe may refer to:

== People ==
- Amanda Dowe (born 1991), American basketball player
- Brent Dowe (died 2006), Jamaican musician
- Chris Dowe (born 1991), American basketball player
- Jens Dowe (born 1968), German athlete
- John Leslie Dowe (fl. from 1994), Australian botanist
- John M. Dowe (1896–1946), American politician
- Julian Dowe (born 1975), English footballer
- Uton Dowe (born 1949), Jamaican cricketer
- Douwe Juwes de Dowe (1608–1662), Dutch painter

== Other uses ==
- Dowe Historic District, in Montgomery, Alabama, U.S.
- Mount Dowe, New South Wales, Australia

== See also ==
- Dow (disambiguation)
- Dhow
