= Trophée des Champions =

- Organiser(s): LFP
- Founded: 1955; 71 years ago
- Region: France
- Teams: 2
- Related competitions: Coupe de France (qualifier); Ligue 1 (qualifier)
- Current champions: Lens (1st title)
- Most championships: Paris Saint-Germain (14 titles)
- 2026 Trophée des Champions

The Trophée des Champions (French pronunciation: [tʁɔ.fe de ʃɑ̃.pjɔ̃], lit. 'Champions' Trophy') is a French association football trophy contested in an annual match between the champions of Ligue 1 and the winners of the Coupe de France. It is equivalent to the super cups found in many other countries.

== History ==
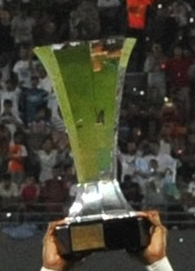
The trophy being held up

The match, with its current name, was first played in 1995, but the format in French football has existed since 1949 when the 1948–49 first division champions, Stade de Reims, defeated the winners of the 1948–49 edition of the Coupe de France, RCF Paris, 4–3 at the Stade Olympique Yves-du-Manoir in Colombes. The match is co-organized by the Ligue de Football Professionnel (LFP) and the Union Syndicale des Journalistes Sportifs de France (UJSF).

From 1955 to 1973, the French Football Federation (FFF) hosted a similar match known as the Challenge des champions. The match returned in 1985, but was eliminated after only two seasons due to its unpopularity. In 1995, the FFF officially re-instated the competition under its current name and the inaugural match was contested between Paris Saint-Germain and Nantes in January 1996 at the Stade Francis-Le Blé in Brest. The following season, the match was not played due to Auxerre winning the double. A similar situation occurred in 2008 when Lyon won the double. The match was initially on the brink of cancellation, however, the LFP decided to allow the league runner-up, Bordeaux, to be Lyon's opponents. Bordeaux won the match 5–4 on penalties.

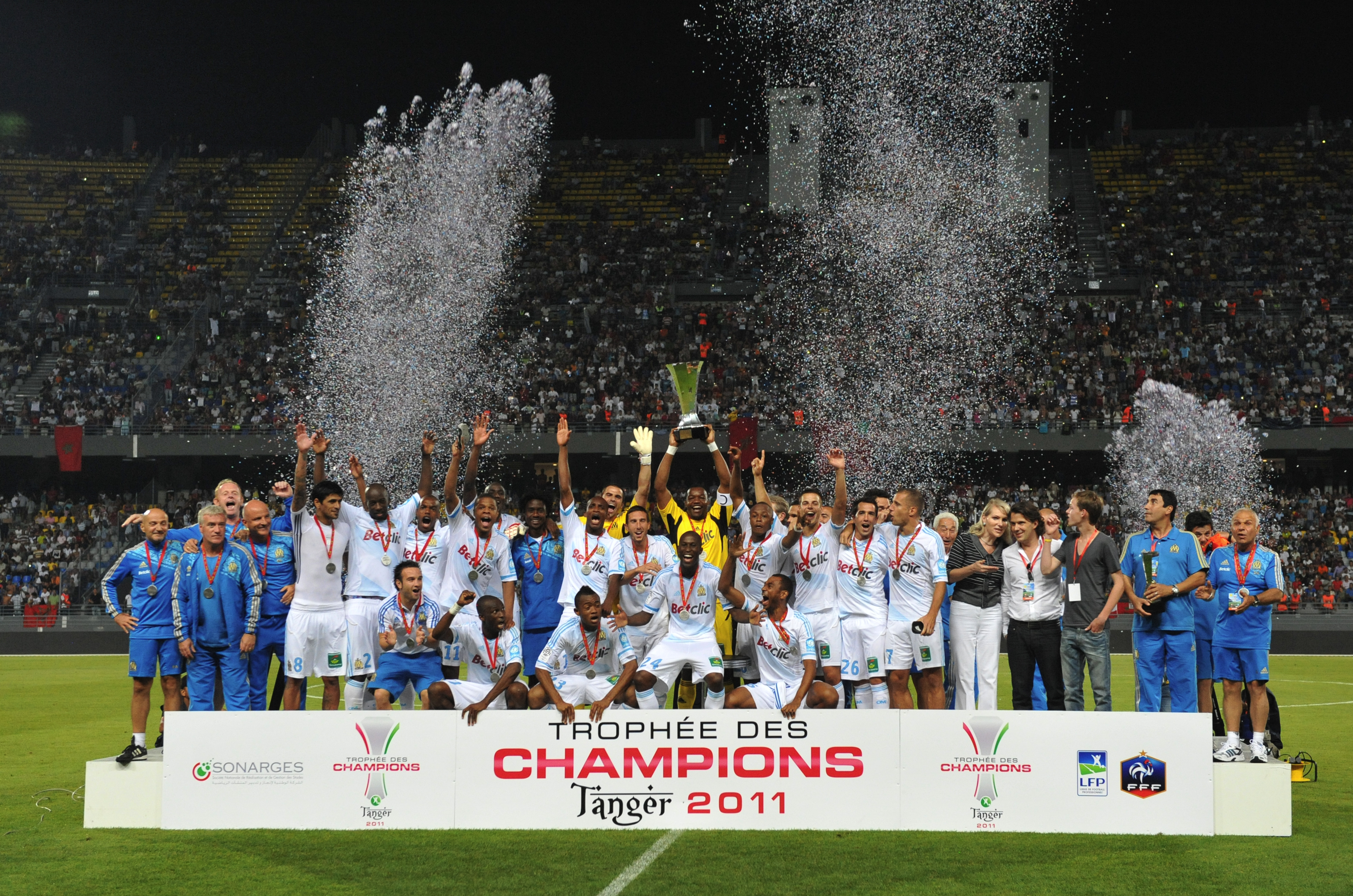
Marseille with the trophy in 2011

The Trophée des Champions match is contested at the beginning or middle of the following season and has been played at a variety of venues. During the Challenge des Champions era, the match was in such cities as Marseille, Montpellier, Paris, Toulouse, and Saint-Étienne. From 1995 to 2008, the match was hosted three times at the Stade Gerland in Lyon. Other venues include the Stade Pierre de Coubertin twice in Cannes, the Stade de la Meinau in Strasbourg, and the Stade de l'Abbé Deschamps in Auxerre.

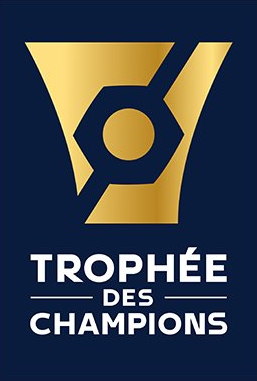
Logo used from 2021 to 2024.

On 12 May 2009, the FFF announced that the 2009 Trophée des Champions would be played outside France for the first time, at the Olympic Stadium in Montreal, Quebec, Canada. It has since been held in Tunisia, Morocco, United States, Gabon, China, Austria, Israel, Qatar, and most recently, Kuwait. For the 2024 season final in Doha, Paris Saint Germain wore Arabic writing on the team's shirts for the first time; the design was created by calligrapher Fatma Al Sharshani.

== Matches ==
| Season | Winners | Score | Runners-up | Venue | Attendance | Notes |
Champions of France vs Coupe de France winners (1949, unofficial)
| 1949 | Reims | 4–3 | Racing Paris | (France) Stade Olympique Yves-du-Manoir, Colombes | | |
Challenge des Champions (1955–73, 1985–86)
| 1955 | Reims | 7–1 | Lille | (France) Stade Vélodrome, Marseille | 5,000 | |
| 1956 | Sedan | 1–0 | Nice | (France) Parc des Princes, Paris | 9,347 | |
| 1957 | Saint-Étienne | 2–1 | Toulouse | (France) Stadium Municipal, Toulouse | 11,254 | |
| 1958 | Reims | 2–1 | Nîmes | (France) Stade Vélodrome, Marseille | 4,659 | |
| 1959 | Le Havre | 2–0 | Nice | (France) Parc des Princes, Paris | 5,006 | |
| 1960 | Reims | 6–2 | Monaco | (France) Stade Marcel Saupin, Nantes | 15,289 | |
| 1961 | Monaco | 1–1 (Note: No penalties were constituted. Monaco won the match via lottery.) | Sedan | (France) Stade Vélodrome, Marseille | 2,000 | |
| 1962 | Saint-Étienne | 4–2 | Reims | (France) Stade Municipal de Beaublanc, Limoges | 8,800 | |
| 1965 | Nantes | 3–2 | Rennes | (France) Stade du Moustoir, Lorient | 12,000 | |
| 1966 | Reims | 2–0 | Nantes | (France) Stade Marcel Saupin, Nantes | 16,000 | |
| 1967 | Saint-Étienne | 3–0 | Lyon | (France) Stade Geoffroy-Guichard, Saint-Étienne | 16,398 | |
| 1968 | Saint-Étienne | 5–3 | Bordeaux | (France) Stade Richter, Montpellier | 5,917 | |
| 1969 | Saint-Étienne | 3–2 | Marseille | (France) Parc des Princes, Paris | 6,416 | |
| 1970 | Nice | 2–0 | Saint-Étienne | (France) Stade du Ray, Nice | 5,023 | |
| 1971 | Rennes and Marseille | 2–2 (Note: No winner was declared. Title was shared between the two clubs.) | Two winners | (France) Stade de l'Armoricaine, Brest | | |
| 1972 | Bastia | 5–2 | Marseille | (France) Stade de Bon Rencontre, Toulon | 10,000 | |
| 1973 | Lyon | 2–0 | Nantes | (France) Stade de l'Armoricaine, Brest | 10,000 | |
| 1985 | Monaco | 1–1 (5–4 p) | Bordeaux | (France) Parc Lescure, Bordeaux | 21,618 | |
| 1986 | Bordeaux | 1–0 | Paris Saint-Germain | (France) Stade Guadeloupe, Les Abymes, Guadeloupe | 12,000 | |
Trophée des Champions (1995–present)
| 1995 (Note: Match was played in January 1996.) | Paris Saint-Germain | 2–2 (6–5 p) | Nantes | (France) Stade Francis-Le Blé, Brest | 12,000 | |
| 1996 | Match was not played due to Auxerre winning the double. | | | | | |
| 1997 | Monaco | 5–2 | Nice | (France) Stade de la Méditerranée, Béziers | 4,000 | |
| 1998 | Paris Saint-Germain | 1–0 | Lens | (France) Stade de la Vallée du Cher, Tours | 12,766 | |
| 1999 | Nantes | 1–0 | Bordeaux | (France) Stade de la Licorne, Amiens | 11,858 | |
| 2000 | Monaco | 0–0 (6–5 p) | Nantes | (France) Stade Bonal, Montbéliard | 9,918 | |
| 2001 | Nantes | 4–1 | Strasbourg | (France) Stade de la Meinau, Strasbourg | 7,227 | |
| 2002 | Lyon | 5–1 | Lorient | (France) Stade Pierre-de-Coubertin, Cannes | 5,041 | |
| 2003 | Lyon | 2–1 | Auxerre | (France) Stade Gerland, Lyon | 18,254 | |
| 2004 | Lyon | 1–1 (7–6 p) | Paris Saint-Germain | (France) Stade Pierre-de-Coubertin, Cannes | 9,429 | |
| 2005 | Lyon | 4–1 | Auxerre | (France) Stade de l'Abbé-Deschamps, Auxerre | 10,967 | |
| 2006 | Lyon | 1–1 (5–4 p) | Paris Saint-Germain | (France) Stade Gerland, Lyon | 30,529 | |
| 2007 | Lyon | 2–1 | Sochaux | (France) Stade Gerland, Lyon | 30,413 | |
| 2008 | Bordeaux | 0–0 (5–4 p) | Lyon | (France) Stade Chaban-Delmas, Bordeaux | 27,167 | |
| 2009 | Bordeaux | 2–0 | Guingamp | Stade Olympique, Montreal, Canada | 34,068 | |
| 2010 | Marseille | 0–0 (5–4 p) | Paris Saint-Germain | Stade 7 November, Tunis, Tunisia | 57,000 | |
| 2011 | Marseille | 5–4 | Lille | Stade Ibn Batouta, Tanger, Morocco | 33,900 | |
| 2012 | Lyon | 2–2 (4–2 p) | Montpellier | Red Bull Arena, Harrison, United States | 15,166 | |
| 2013 | Paris Saint-Germain | 2–1 | Bordeaux | Stade d'Angondjé, Libreville, Gabon | 34,658 | |
| 2014 | Paris Saint-Germain | 2–0 | Guingamp | Workers Stadium, Beijing, China | 39,752 | |
| 2015 | Paris Saint-Germain | 2–0 | Lyon | Stade Saputo, Montreal, Canada | 20,057 | |
| 2016 | Paris Saint-Germain | 4–1 | Lyon | Wörthersee Stadion, Klagenfurt, Austria | 10,120 | |
| 2017 | Paris Saint-Germain | 2–1 | Monaco | Stade Ibn Batouta, Tanger, Morocco | 43,761 | |
| 2018 | Paris Saint-Germain | 4–0 | Monaco | Shenzhen Universiade Sports Centre, Shenzhen, China | 41,237 | |
| 2019 | Paris Saint-Germain | 2–1 | Rennes | Shenzhen Universiade Sports Centre, Shenzhen, China | 22,045 | |
| 2020 (Note: Match was played in January 2021.) | Paris Saint-Germain | 2–1 | Marseille | (France) Stade Bollaert-Delelis, Lens | 0 (Note: Match was played behind closed doors due to the COVID-19 pandemic in France.) | |
| 2021 | Lille | 1–0 | Paris Saint-Germain | Bloomfield Stadium, Tel Aviv, Israel | 29,000 | |
| 2022 | Paris Saint-Germain | 4–0 | Nantes | Bloomfield Stadium, Tel Aviv, Israel | 28,000 | |
| 2023 (Note: Match was played in January 2024.) | Paris Saint-Germain | 2–0 | Toulouse | (France) Parc des Princes, Paris | 43,792 | |
| 2024 (Note: Match was played in January 2025.) | Paris Saint-Germain | 1–0 | Monaco | Stadium 974, Doha, Qatar | 39,682 | |
| 2025 (Note: Match was played in January 2026.) | Paris Saint-Germain | 2–2 (4–1 p) | Marseille | Jaber Al-Ahmad International Stadium, Kuwait City, Kuwait | 52,215 | |
| 2026 | Lens | 1–0 | Paris Saint-Germain | (France) Stade Bollaert-Delelis, Lens | 38,223 | |

== Results by club ==
| Club | Winners | Runners-up | Winning years | Runners-up years |
|---|---|---|---|---|
| Paris Saint-Germain | 14 | 6 | 1995, 1998, 2013, 2014, 2015, 2016, 2017, 2018, 2019, 2020, 2022, 2023, 2024, 2025 | 1986, 2004, 2006, 2010, 2021, 2026 |
| Lyon | 8 | 4 | 1973, 2002, 2003, 2004, 2005, 2006, 2007, 2012 | 1967, 2008, 2015, 2016 |
| Saint-Étienne | 5 | 1 | 1957, 1962, 1967, 1968, 1969 | 1970 |
| Reims | 5* | 1 | 1949* (unofficial), 1955, 1958, 1960, 1966 | 1962 |
| Monaco | 4 | 4 | 1961, 1985, 1997, 2000 | 1960, 2017, 2018, 2024 |
| Nantes | 3 | 5 | 1965, 1999, 2001 | 1966, 1973, 1995, 2000, 2022 |
| Bordeaux | 3 | 4 | 1986, 2008, 2009 | 1968, 1985, 1999, 2013 |
| Marseille | 3 | 4 | 1971, 2010, 2011 | 1969, 1972, 2020, 2025 |
| Nice | 1 | 3 | 1970 | 1956, 1959, 1997 |
| Rennes | 1 | 2 | 1971 | 1965, 2019 |
| Lille | 1 | 2 | 2021 | 1955, 2011 |
| Lens | 1 | 1 | 2026 | 1998 |
| Sedan | 1 | 1 | 1956 | 1961 |
| Le Havre | 1 | 0 | 1959 | – |
| Bastia | 1 | 0 | 1972 | – |
| Auxerre | 0 | 2 | – | 2003, 2005 |
| Guingamp | 0 | 2 | – | 2009, 2014 |
| Racing Paris | 0 | 1 | – | 1949 |
| Toulouse (1937) | 0 | 1 | – | 1957 |
| Nîmes | 0 | 1 | – | 1958 |
| Strasbourg | 0 | 1 | – | 2001 |
| Lorient | 0 | 1 | – | 2002 |
| Sochaux | 0 | 1 | – | 2007 |
| Montpellier | 0 | 1 | – | 2012 |
| Toulouse | 0 | 1 | – | 2023 |
