= Dow (surname) =

Dow (/daʊ/) is a surname. Notable people with the surname include:

- Abigail Dow (born 1997), English rugby union player
- Albert G. Dow (1808–1908), New York politician
- Arthur Wesley Dow (1857–1922), American painter, printmaker, photographer, and arts educator.
- Charles Dow (1851–1902), founder of Dow Jones & Co
- Cornelia M. Dow (1842–1905), philanthropist, temperance activist; daughter of Neal Dow
- Eliphaz Dow (1705–1755), first male executed in New Hampshire
- G. M. Keith Dow (born 1937), Canadian politician
- Gardner Dow (1898–1919), American college football player
- Harold Dow (1947–2010), from the 48 Hours Mystery TV series
- Herbert Henry Dow (1866–1930), founder of Dow Chemical Company
- James R. Dow, professor of German language
- Mary Edna Hill Gray Dow, American financier, school principal and correspondent
- Nancy Dow (1936–2016), actress, mother of Jennifer Aniston
- Neal Dow (1804–1897), prohibitionist
- Paula Dow (born 1955), 58th Attorney General of New Jersey
- Ryan Dow (born 1991), Scottish footballer for Dundee United
- Sterling Dow (1903–1995), American epigrapher, historian, and archaeologist of ancient Greece
- Tony Dow (1945-2022), American actor who played Wally in the Leave it to Beaver TV series
- Tony Dow (director), British television director

== See also ==
- Dowe (disambiguation)
- Dows (surname)
