= Duh =

Duh, Duh! or DUH may refer to:

== Music ==
- Duh (album), 1992, by Lagwagon
- DUH (band), an American noise rock group
- Duh! (EP), 2025, by P1Harmony
- "Duh", 2009, by rapper Brianna Perry

== Other uses ==
- Matija Duh (1989–2013), Slovenian motorcycle racer
- Deutsche Umwelthilfe, a German environmental NGO
- Dyschromatosis universalis hereditaria, a hereditary skin disorder
- Toledo Suburban Airport, Michigan, US (FAA:DUH)
- Bhilori language (ISO 639-3:duh)

== See also ==
- Der (disambiguation)
- DUR (disambiguation)
- D'oh!, a catchphrase used by Homer Simpson
- Doh (disambiguation)
