= Foundation for Information Policy Research =

The Foundation for Information Policy Research is a UK-based think tank that studies the interaction between information technology and government, business and civil society. It has been described by academics as "the leading think-tank on information policy issues in Britain". Although still registered at Companies House, it did not publish any research between 2017 and 2025 when it re-launched with a new Board.

Established in May 1998, the organisation is a non-profit company limited by guarantee. Its policy is governed by an independent board of trustees in consultation with an advisory council.

In 2008, FIPR argued that a planned partnership between telecom group BT and targeted advertising Phorm technology was illegal under the Regulation of Investigatory Powers Act 2000.

== Trustees and Advisory Council ==
FIPR's trustees have variously been: Professor Ross Anderson (chair), Nicholas Bohm (general counsel), Dr. Richard Clayton (treasurer), Fleur Fisher and Jim Norton.

Members of the Advisory Council have included Joanna Bryson, Shami Chakrabarti, Alan Cox, Jon Crowcroft, Lilian Edwards, Maurice Frankel, Becky Hogge, Douwe Korff, Mark Littlewood, Steven Murdoch, Danny Quah, Martyn Thomas, Paul Whitehouse, Wendy M. Grossman, and Phil Zimmermann.
