= Dirr =

Dirr may refer to:

- Michael Dirr, American horticulturist
  - Dirr's Trees and Shrubs for Warm Climates, sometimes abbreviated Dirr or Dirr's; see List of horticulture and gardening books/publications
- Otillie Dirr, a founder of the Sisters of St. Francis of Assisi
- dirr, an abbreviation for dwarf irregular galaxy

== See also ==
- Dir (disambiguation)
- Durr (disambiguation)
- Duerr (disambiguation)
