= Dyschromatosis universalis hereditaria =

- Specialty: Dermatology

Dyschromatosis universalis hereditaria is a type of pigmentation disorder of the skin. It is characterized by dark and light spots formed like lace in a generalized distribution.

Both autosomal dominant and recessive inheritance have been reported with the disorder.

It has been associated with mutations in genes SASH1 and ABCB6.

It is a rare genodermatosis.
