= Heavy Load =

Heavy Load may refer to:

== Music ==
- Heavy Load (album), 1993 album by New Kingdom
- Heavy Load (band), a Swedish heavy metal band
- Heavy Load (punk band), a British punk band composed of members suffering from various disabilities
  - Heavy Load (film), a British documentary about the punk band Heavy Load
- "Heavy Load", a song by Cathedral from the album Caravan Beyond Redemption
- "Heavy Load", a song by Free from the album Fire and Water

== Other uses ==
- Heavy Load (Transformers), several fictional characters in the Transformers universes

== See also ==
- Load (disambiguation)
- Overloading (disambiguation)
- Haulage
- Freight
