= List of United States Supreme Court cases, volume 85 =

Supreme Court of the United States
- Interactive map of Supreme Court of the United States
- 38°53′26″N 77°00′16″W
- Established: March 4, 1789; 236 years ago
- Location: Washington, D.C.
- Coordinates: 38°53′26″N 77°00′16″W
- Composition method: Presidential nomination with Senate confirmation
- Authorised by: Constitution of the United States, Art. III, § 1
- Judge term length: life tenure, subject to impeachment and removal
- Number of positions: 9 (by statute)
- Website: supremecourt.gov

This is a list of cases reported in volume 85 (18 Wall.) of United States Reports, decided by the Supreme Court of the United States in 1873 and 1874.

== Nominative reports ==
In 1874, the U.S. government created the United States Reports, and retroactively numbered older privately published case reports as part of the new series. As a result, cases appearing in volumes 1–90 of U.S. Reports have dual citation forms; one for the volume number of U.S. Reports, and one for the volume number of the reports named for the relevant reporter of decisions (these are called "nominative reports").

=== John William Wallace ===
Starting with the 66th volume of U.S. Reports, the Reporter of Decisions of the Supreme Court of the United States was John William Wallace. Wallace was Reporter of Decisions from 1863 to 1874, covering volumes 68 through 90 of United States Reports which correspond to volumes 1 through 23 of his Wallace's Reports. As such, the dual form of citation to, for example, Atkins v. Disintegrating Co. is 85 U.S. (18 Wall.) 272 (1874).

Wallace's Reports were the final nominative reports for the US Supreme Court; starting with volume 91, cases were identified simply as "(volume #) U.S. (page #) (year)".

== Justices of the Supreme Court at the time of 85 U.S. (18 Wall.) ==
The Supreme Court is established by Article III, Section 1 of the Constitution of the United States, which says: "The judicial Power of the United States, shall be vested in one supreme Court . . .". The size of the Court is not specified; the Constitution leaves it to Congress to set the number of justices. Under the Judiciary Act of 1789 Congress originally fixed the number of justices at six (one chief justice and five associate justices). Since 1789 Congress has varied the size of the Court from six to seven, nine, ten, and back to nine justices (always including one chief justice).

When the cases in 85 U.S. (18 Wall.) were decided the Court comprised the following nine members:

Portrait	Justice	Office	Home State	Succeeded	Date confirmed by the Senate (Vote)	Tenure on Supreme Court
	Morrison Waite	Chief Justice	Ohio	Salmon P. Chase	January 21, 1874 (63–0)	March 4, 1874 – March 23, 1888 (Died)
	Nathan Clifford	Associate Justice	Maine	Benjamin Robbins Curtis	January 12, 1858 (26–23)	January 21, 1858 – July 25, 1881 (Died)
	Noah Haynes Swayne	Associate Justice	Ohio	John McLean	January 24, 1862 (38–1)	January 27, 1862 – January 24, 1881 (Retired)
	Samuel Freeman Miller	Associate Justice	Iowa	Peter Vivian Daniel	July 16, 1862 (Acclamation)	July 21, 1862 – October 13, 1890 (Died)
	David Davis	Associate Justice	Illinois	John Archibald Campbell	December 8, 1862 (Acclamation)	December 10, 1862 – March 4, 1877 (Resigned)
	Stephen Johnson Field	Associate Justice	California	newly created seat	March 10, 1863 (Acclamation)	May 10, 1863 – December 1, 1897 (Retired)
	William Strong	Associate Justice	Pennsylvania	Robert Cooper Grier	February 18, 1870 (No vote recorded)	March 14, 1870 – December 14, 1880 (Retired)
	Joseph P. Bradley	Associate Justice	New Jersey	newly created seat	March 21, 1870 (46–9)	March 23, 1870 – January 22, 1892 (Died)
	Ward Hunt	Associate Justice	New York	Samuel Nelson	December 11, 1872 (Acclamation)	January 9, 1873 – January 27, 1882 (Retired)

== Citation style ==
Under the Judiciary Act of 1789 the federal court structure at the time comprised District Courts, which had general trial jurisdiction; Circuit Courts, which had mixed trial and appellate (from the US District Courts) jurisdiction; and the United States Supreme Court, which had appellate jurisdiction over the federal District and Circuit courts—and for certain issues over state courts. The Supreme Court also had limited original jurisdiction (i.e., in which cases could be filed directly with the Supreme Court without first having been heard by a lower federal or state court). There were one or more federal District Courts and/or Circuit Courts in each state, territory, or other geographical region.

Bluebook citation style is used for case names, citations, and jurisdictions.

- "C.C.D." = United States Circuit Court for the District of . . .
  - e.g.,"C.C.D.N.J." = United States Circuit Court for the District of New Jersey
- "D." = United States District Court for the District of . . .
  - e.g.,"D. Mass." = United States District Court for the District of Massachusetts
- "E." = Eastern; "M." = Middle; "N." = Northern; "S." = Southern; "W." = Western
  - e.g.,"C.C.S.D.N.Y." = United States Circuit Court for the Southern District of New York
  - e.g.,"M.D. Ala." = United States District Court for the Middle District of Alabama
- "Ct. Cl." = United States Court of Claims
- The abbreviation of a state's name alone indicates the highest appellate court in that state's judiciary at the time.
  - e.g.,"Pa." = Supreme Court of Pennsylvania
  - e.g.,"Me." = Supreme Judicial Court of Maine

== List of cases in 85 U.S. (18 Wall.) ==
Case Name	Page and year	Opinion of the Court	Concurring opinion(s)	Dissenting opinion(s)	Lower court	Disposition
Allen and Company v. Ferguson	1 (1874)	Hunt	none	none	C.C.E.D. Ark.	affirmed
Union Pacific Railroad Company v. Peniston	5 (1873)	Strong	Swayne	Bradley	C.C.D. Neb.	affirmed
The Sapphire	51 (1874)	Strong	none	none	C.C.D. Cal.	affirmed
Weber v. Board of State Harbor Commissioners of California	57 (1873)	Field	none	none	C.C.D. Cal.	affirmed
Carroll County v. United States	71 (1873)	Strong	none	Clifford	C.C.D. Iowa	reversed
Stuart v. United States	84 (1874)	Hunt	none	none	Ct. Cl.	affirmed
Willett v. Fister	91 (1873)	Strong	none	none	Sup. Ct. D.C.	reversed
Masterson's Assignee v. Howard	99 (1873)	Field	none	none	C.C.W.D. Tex.	affirmed
Washington University v. Finch	106 (1874)	Miller	none	none	C.C.D. Miss.	reversed
Best v. Polk	112 (1873)	Davis	none	none	N.D. Miss.	reversed
Coffin v. Ogden	120 (1874)	Swayne	none	none	C.C.S.D.N.Y.	affirmed
An anticipation of an invention or discovery must be complete and capable of working to invalidate a patent for lack of novelty, but the prior knowledge or use does not need to be public. The words "by others" only require that the invention be known or used by someone other than the applicant.
United States v. Buzzo	125 (1873)	Bradley	none	none	C.C.E.D. Mich.	certification
Bartemeyer v. Iowa	129 (1874)	Miller	Bradley, Field	none	Iowa	affirmed
Sykes v. Chadwick	141 (1874)	Bradley	none	Miller	Sup. Ct. D.C.	affirmed
Batesville Institute v. Kauffman	151 (1873)	Hunt	none	none	C.C.E.D. Ark.	affirmed
Day v. Micou	156 (1874)	Strong	none	none	La.	affirmed
Ex parte Lange	163 (1874)	Miller	none	Clifford	C.C.S.D.N.Y.	habeas corpus granted
The Delaware Railroad Tax	206 (1874)	Field	none	none	C.C.D. Del.	affirmed
Chicago City Railway Co. v. Allerton	233 (1874)	Bradley	none	none	C.C.N.D. Ill.	affirmed
Mercantile Mutual Insurance Company of New York v. Folsom	237 (1874)	Clifford	none	none	C.C.S.D.N.Y.	affirmed
Henshaw v. Bissell	255 (1874)	Field	none	none	C.C.D. Cal.	affirmed
Atkins v. Fibre Disintegrating Company	272 (1874)	Swayne	none	none	C.C.E.D.N.Y.	reversed
Lamb v. Davenport	307 (1873)	Miller	none	none	C.C.D. Ore.	affirmed
Snow v. United States	317 (1873)	Bradley	none	none	Sup. Ct. Terr. Utah	affirmed
Westray v. United States	322 (1873)	Strong	none	none	C.C.S.D.N.Y.	affirmed
Cook v. Tullis	332 (1874)	Field	none	none	C.C.S.D. Ohio	affirmed
Mulhall v. Keenan	342 (1873)	Swayne	none	none	C.C.D. Mo.	affirmed
Galpin v. Page	350 (1874)	Field	none	none	C.C.D. Cal.	reversed
Tiffany v. Boatman's Institution	375 (1874)	Davis	none	none	C.C.D. Mo.	reversed
Trask v. Maguire	391 (1874)	Field	none	none	C.C.D. Mo.	affirmed
Tiffany v. National Bank of Missouri	409 (1874)	Strong	none	none	C.C.D. Mo.	affirmed
Eunson v. Dodge	414 (1873)	Hunt	none	none	C.C.S.D.N.Y.	affirmed
Ex parte State Insurance Company	417 (1874)	Miller	none	none	C.C.S.D. Ala.	mandamus denied
Miltenberger v. Cooke	421 (1874)	Swayne	none	none	La.	affirmed
Brent v. Maryland	430 (1873)	Hunt	none	none	Sup. Ct. D.C.	affirmed
Lucas v. Brooks	436 (1873)	Strong	none	none	C.C.D.W. Va.	affirmed
Thompson v. Whitman	457 (1874)	Bradley	none	none	C.C.S.D.N.Y.	affirmed
Nashville and Decatur Railroad Company v. Orr	471 (1873)	Hunt	none	none	M.D. Ala.	reversed
Glenn v. Johnson	476 (1874)	Field	none	none	N.D. Ga.	affirmed
New Jersey Steamboat Company v. Collector of the United States at New York	478 (1873)	Swayne	none	Bradley	C.C.S.D.N.Y.	affirmed
Clarke v. Boorman's Executors	493 (1874)	Miller	none	none	C.C.S.D.N.Y.	affirmed
Bean v. Beckwith	510 (1874)	Field	none	none	C.C.D. Vt.	certification
Chaffee and Company v. United States	516 (1874)	Field	none	none	C.C.S.D. Ohio	reversed
Boyce v. Tabb	546 (1873)	Davis	none	none	C.C.D. La.	affirmed
Tacey v. Irwin	549 (1873)	Davis	none	none	C.C.E.D. Va.	affirmed
Town of Ohio v. Marcy	552 (1873)	Miller	none	none	C.C.N.D. Ill.	affirmed
Case of the Sewing Machine Companies	553 (1874)	Clifford	none	none	Mass.	affirmed
Moore v. Robbins	588 (1873)	Swayne	none	none	Ill.	dismissed
Bullard v. National Eagle Bank	589 (1874)	Strong	none	Clifford	C.C.D. Mass.	certification
The Favorita	598 (1874)	Davis	none	none	C.C.E.D.N.Y.	affirmed
Espy v. First National Bank of Cincinnati	604 (1874)	Miller	none	none	C.C.S.D. Ohio	affirmed
Grant v. Strong	623 (1874)	Miller	none	none	Sup. Ct. D.C.	reversed
City of Davenport v. Dows	626 (1874)	Davis	none	none	C.C.D. Iowa	reversed
St. Clair County v. Lovingston	628 (1873)	Strong	none	none	Ill.	dismissed
Gray v. Rollo	629 (1874)	Bradley	none	none	C.C.N.D. Ill.	affirmed
Bartholow v. Bean	635 (1874)	Miller	none	none	C.C.D. Mo.	affirmed
Dandelet v. Smith	642 (1873)	Bradley	none	none	C.C.D. Md.	affirmed
Hornbuckle v. Toombs	648 (1874)	Bradley	none	Clifford	Sup. Ct. Terr. Mont.	affirmed
Hershfield v. Griffith	657 (1874)	Bradley	none	none	Sup. Ct. Terr. Mont.	affirmed
Davis v. Bilsland	659 (1874)	Bradley	none	none	Sup. Ct. Terr. Mont.	affirmed
Jones v. United States	662 (1874)	Clifford	none	none	C.C.S.D. Ga.	affirmed
Shrewsbury v. United States	664 (1874)	Hunt	none	none	Ct. Cl.	affirmed
Hicks v. Kelsey	670 (1874)	Bradley	none	none	C.C.N.D. Ill.	affirmed
