= HD =

HD may refer to:

== Business ==
- H-D or Harley-Davidson, a motorcycle manufacturer
- The Home Depot, NYSE stock symbol: HD

== Chemistry ==
- Hydrogen deuteride, a diatomic compound of hydrogen and deuterium
- Mustard gas

== Codes ==
- Air Do, formerly Hokkaido International Airlines, IATA designator
- HD postcode area, covering Huddersfield, Brighouse and Holmfirth in England, UK
- Heidelberg's vehicle registration plate code
- Hunedoara County (Romania)'s ISO 3166 code

== Medicine ==
- Hansen's disease or leprosy
- Hirschsprung's disease, a disorder of the abdomen
- Huntington's disease, a genetic disorder affecting the central nervous system
  - HD (gene) or huntingtin, the IT15 gene, which codes for the huntingtin protein

== People ==
- H.D. or Hilda Doolittle (1886–1961), American poet and novelist

== Technology ==
- Hard drive, an electro-mechanical data storage device
- Hash digest, the output of a hash function
- HD Photo, an image format
- HD Radio, an abbreviation from the term hybrid digital/analog radio
- HD Voice, or wideband audio
- Heavy Duty (disambiguation)
- High density, a diskette density
- High-definition television (HDTV), a resolution that is substantially higher than that of standard-definition television
  - 720p (HD), a progressive HDTV signal format with 720 horizontal lines/1280 columns and an aspect ratio (AR) of 16:9
  - 1080p (Full HD), or 1080i
  - 4K HD (Ultra HD), or 8K UHD
- High-definition video, video of higher resolution and quality than standard-definition
- Intel High Definition Audio, a specification for the audio sub-system of personal computers

== Other uses ==
- Helsingborgs Dagblad, a Swedish newspaper
- Henry Draper Catalogue, an astronomical catalogue often used to designate stars
- Department of Highways (disambiguation)
- Högsta Domstolen, the Supreme Court of Sweden
- Hurter and Driffield Numbers or H&D, an old scale for measuring film speed
