= Heavy Load (punk band) =

English punk rock band

- Origin: Sussex, England
- Genres: Punk rock, crust punk
- Years active: 1996–2012
- Members: Simon Barker; Jimmy Nichols; Paul Richards; Michael White; Mick Williams

Heavy Load were an English punk rock band, described by The Sunday Times in 2009 as "possibly the most genuinely punk band touring today".

Its members met at Southdown Housing, a non-profit assisted-living community for people with mental health issues and learning disabilities, and were a mix of service users and staff.

The band composed the theme for the BAFTA-nominated film Cast Offs and is itself documented in the film Heavy Load.

The band were also the founders of the charity Stay Up Late, a campaign seeking to improve the social lives of people with learning difficulties by calling for more flexible staff hours. Stay Up Late is a national charity promoting full and active social lives for people with learning disabilities.

Heavy Load split in September 2012 with a final gig in London's Trafalgar Square as part of the Paralympic festivities. Simon Barker died suddenly on 10 August 2017.

== Band members ==
- Simon Barker, vocals
- Jimmy Nichols, guitar and vocals
- Paul Richards, bass guitar
- Mick Williams, guitar and vocals
- Michael White, drums

== Albums ==
Title	Date of Release
Wham	2011
Shut It	2008
The Queen Mother's Dead	2006
