= SASH1 =

Protein-coding gene in the species Homo sapiens

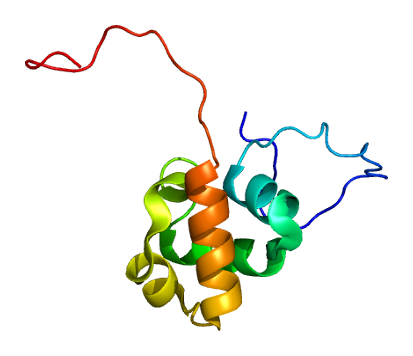

Identifiers
- Aliases: SASH1, SH3D6A, dJ323M4, dJ323M4.1, SAM and SH3 domain containing 1, DUH1, CAPOK
- External IDs: OMIM: 607955; MGI: 1917347; GeneCards: SASH1
Available structures
| PDB | Ortholog search: PDBe RCSB |
| PDB | List of PDB id codes 2EBP |

Gene location (Human)
| Chr. | Chromosome 6 (human) |
| Band | 6q24.3-q25.1 | Start | 148,272,304 bp |
| Band | 6q24.3-q25.1 | End | 148,552,044 bp |

Gene location (Mouse)
| Chr. | Chromosome 10 (mouse) |
| Band | 10|10 A1 | Start | 8,597,983 bp |
| Band | 10|10 A1 | End | 8,761,814 bp |
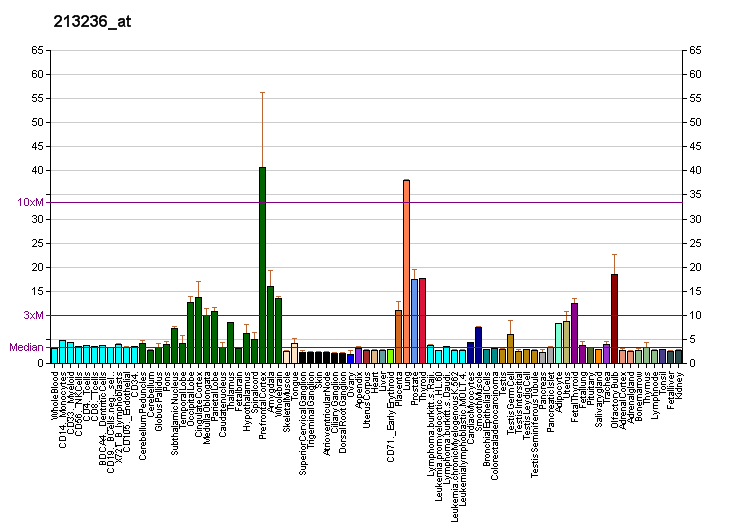

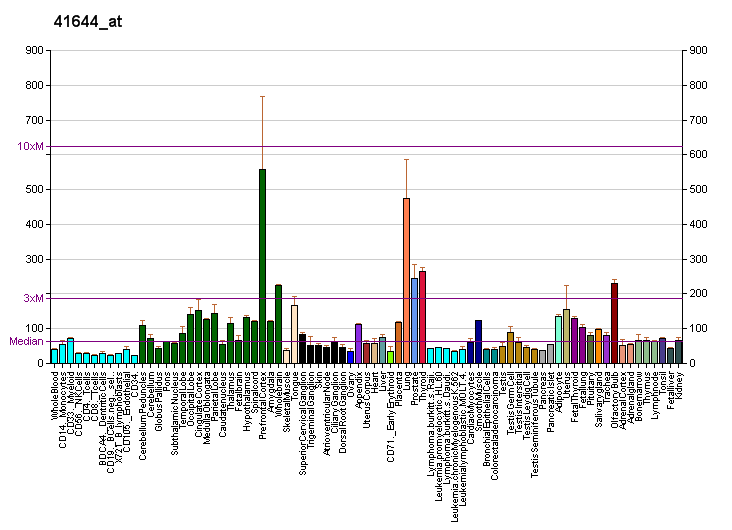
RNA expression pattern
| Bgee | Human / Mouse (ortholog); Top expressed in: synovial joint; external globus pallidus; skin of hip; subthalamic nucleus; skin of thigh; inferior ganglion of vagus nerve; oral cavity; pars reticulata; Achilles tendon; lateral nuclear group of thalamus / Top expressed in: stroma of bone marrow; transitional epithelium of urinary bladder; medial geniculate nucleus; lateral geniculate nucleus; substantia nigra; suprachiasmatic nucleus; ventral tegmental area; medial dorsal nucleus; lateral hypothalamus; deep cerebellar nuclei; More reference expression data |
| BioGPS | More reference expression data |
Gene ontology
| Molecular function | mitogen-activated protein kinase kinase kinase binding; molecular adaptor activity; protein C-terminus binding; protein kinase binding |
| Cellular component | protein-containing complex |
| Biological process | positive regulation of endothelial cell migration; positive regulation of lipopolysaccharide-mediated signaling pathway; positive regulation of JUN kinase activity; regulation of protein K63-linked ubiquitination; positive regulation of p38MAPK cascade; regulation of protein autoubiquitination; protein polyubiquitination; positive regulation of NIK/NF-kappaB signaling; positive regulation of angiogenesis |
Sources:Amigo / QuickGO
Orthologs
| Databases | NCBI: entry; OMA: entry |
| Species | Human | Mouse |
| Entrez | 23328 | 70097 |
| Ensembl | ENSG00000111961 | ENSMUSG00000015305 |
| UniProt | O94885 | P59808 |
| RefSeq (mRNA) | NM_015278; NM_001346505; NM_001346506; NM_001346507; NM_001346508 NM_001346509 | NM_175155 |
| RefSeq (protein) | NP_001333434; NP_001333435; NP_001333436; NP_001333437; NP_001333438 NP_056093 | NP_780364 |
| Location (UCSC) | Chr 6: 148.27 – 148.55 Mb | Chr 10: 8.6 – 8.76 Mb |
| PubMed search |
- Wikidata
| View/Edit Human | View/Edit Mouse |

SAM and SH3 domain-containing protein 1 is a protein that in humans is encoded by the SASH1 gene.
