= Guðni Helgason =

Icelandic footballer

Personal information
- Full name: Guðni Runar Helgason
- Date of birth: 16 July 1976 (age 50)
- Position: Midfielder

Youth career
- 1993–1994: ÍF Völsungur
- 1994–1995: Sunderland A.F.C.

Senior career*
Years	Team	Apps	(Gls)
1995–1996	ÍF Völsungur		
1997	ÍB Vestmannaeyja		
1997–1998	SG Wattenscheid 09		
1998–2000	ÍB Vestmannaeyja		
2000–2001	L/F Hønefoss	25	(2)
2001–2003	Valur		
2002	→ IK Start	8	(0)
2004–2008	Fylkir		
2008–2009	UMF Stjarnan		
- * Club domestic league appearances and goals

Guðni Runar Helgason (born 16 July 1976) is a retired Icelandic football midfielder.
