= Renate Dürr =

German historian and academic

Renate Dürr (born 29 March 1961, Bologna, Italy) is a German historian and academic. Her research focuses on Lutheran church spaces, religious history, the history of European expansion, the history of translation, Jesuit reductions, reciprocal cultural transfers, confessionalization, and women and gender history of the early modern period.

== Biography ==
Renate Dürr studied History and Political Science in Hamburg and Berlin from 1982 to 1988. From 1988 to 1989, she worked as an academic assistant for Knut Schulz at the Free University of Berlin in a research project which investigated German artisans in Italy from the 14th to the 16th centuries. From 1990 to 1993 she received a doctoral scholarship by the Evangelische Studienwerk Villigst, completing her doctorate in 1994. From 1994 to 1999 she taught at the University of Tübingen and the University of Stuttgart. From 1996 to 1999, Dürr participated as a research associate in a research project on Lutheran and Catholic spirituality in the early modern period coordinated by Louise Schorn-Schütte. From 1999 to 2004, she was the academic assistant in the Early Modern History Department of the Goethe University Frankfurt. She completed her Habilitation titled Politische Kultur in der Frühen Neuzeit: Kirchenräume in Hildesheimer Stadt- und Landgemeinden, 1550–1750 (Political culture in the early modern period: Church spaces in urban and rural parishes in the diocese of Hildesheim, 1550–1750). From 2004 to 2006, she worked as a senior lecturer at the University of Kassel, receiving a promotion to the full professorship of Early Modern History at the same university in 2006. In 2011, Dürr was appointed Professor of Early Modern History at the University of Tübingen.

Since 2014, Dürr has been a member of the board of the Association of German Historians as well as its Working Group Early Modern History. She first held the latter office from 2007 to 2011. Since 2016, she has been on the board of the Verein für Reformationsgeschichte and is one of the editors of the journal Archive for Reformation History jointly published by the Verein für Reformationsgeschichte and the American Society for Reformation Research. Dürr is a member of a variety of additional professional organizations as well as advisory boards for institutions such as the Leibniz Institute of European History in Mainz (since 2016) and the academic journal German History (since 2014). She has also been a member of the Historical Commission of Hessen since 2007 and the Historical Commission for Baden-Württemberg (Kommission für geschichtliche Landeskunde in Baden-Württemberg) since 2012.

== Writings ==
Monographs

Mägde in der Stadt: Das Beispiel Schwäbisch Hall in der Frühen Neuzeit [Maidservants in towns: The example of Schwäbisch Hall in the early modern period] (Geschichte und Geschlecht 13; Frankfurt: Campus, 1995).

Nonne, Magd oder Ratsfrau: Frauenleben in Leonberg aus vier Jahrhunderten [Nun, maidservant, or councillor: Women's lives from four centuries of Leonberg's history] (Beiträge zur Stadtgeschichte 6; Leonberg: Stadtarchiv Leonberg, 1998).

Frauenarbeit in Haus, Handel und Gewerbe: Ihr Beitrag zur Hamburger Stadtwirtschaft im 14. Jahrhundert [Women's work in the house, in commerce, and in the trades: Their contribution to Hamburg's economy in the fourteenth century] (Hochschulschriften 10; Berlin: Trafo, 2005).

Politische Kultur in der Frühen Neuzeit. Kirchenräume in Hildesheimer Stadt- und Landgemeinden, 1550–1750 [Political culture in the early modern period: Church spaces in urban and rural parishes in the diocese of Hildesheim, 1550–1750] (Quellen und Forschungen zur Reformationsgeschichte 77; Gütersloh: Gütersloher Verlagshaus, 2006).

Edited Books

with Ulrike Gleixner, Barbara Hoffmann, and Helga Zöttlein (eds.), Heide Wunder: Der andere Blick auf die Frühe Neuzeit; Forschungen 1974–1995 [Heide Wunder: A different perspective on the early modern period; Papers from 1974 to 1995] (Königstein im Taunus: Helmer, 1999).

with Gisela Engel and Johannes Süßmann (eds.), Eigene und fremde Frühe Neuzeiten: Genese und Geltung eines Epochenbegriffes [‘Our’ and ‘their’ early modern periods: Genesis and validity of a concept of periodization] (Historische Zeitschrift special issue

with Gisela Engel and Johannes Süßmann (eds.), Expansionen in der Frühen Neuzeit [Expansion in the early modern period] (Zeitschrift für Historische Forschung Beiheft 34; Berlin: Duncker & Humblott, 2004).

with Gerd Schwerhoff (eds.), "Kirchen, Märkte und Tavernen: Erfahrungs- und Handlungsräume in der Frühen Neuzeit" [Churches, markets and taverns: Spaces of experience and action], special issue, Zeitsprünge 9, nos. 3-4 (2005).
