= Dowe Historic District =

Historic district in Alabama, United States

- U.S. National Register of Historic Places
- U.S. Historic district
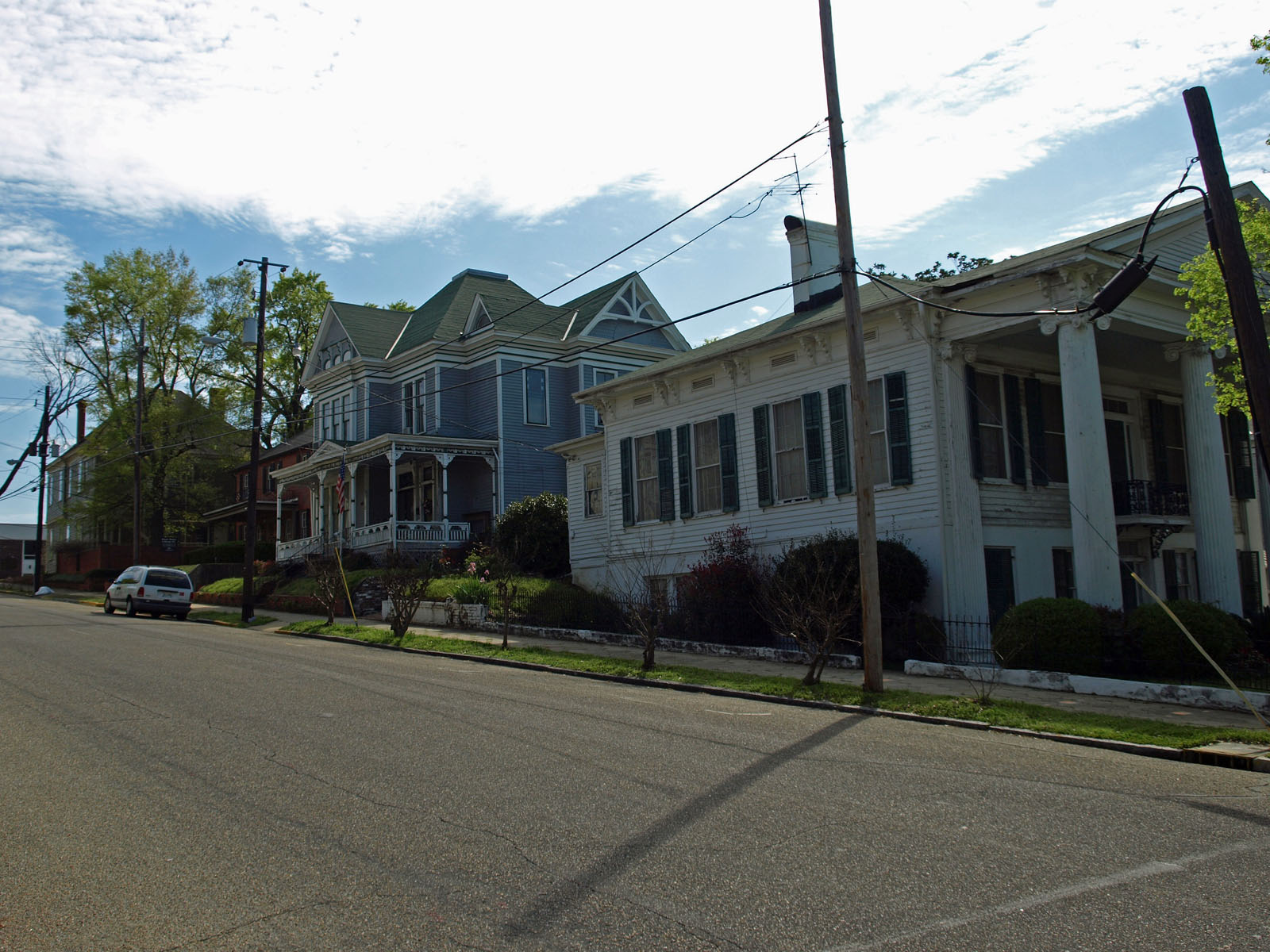
- 114 South Hull Street (left) and 334 Washington Avenue

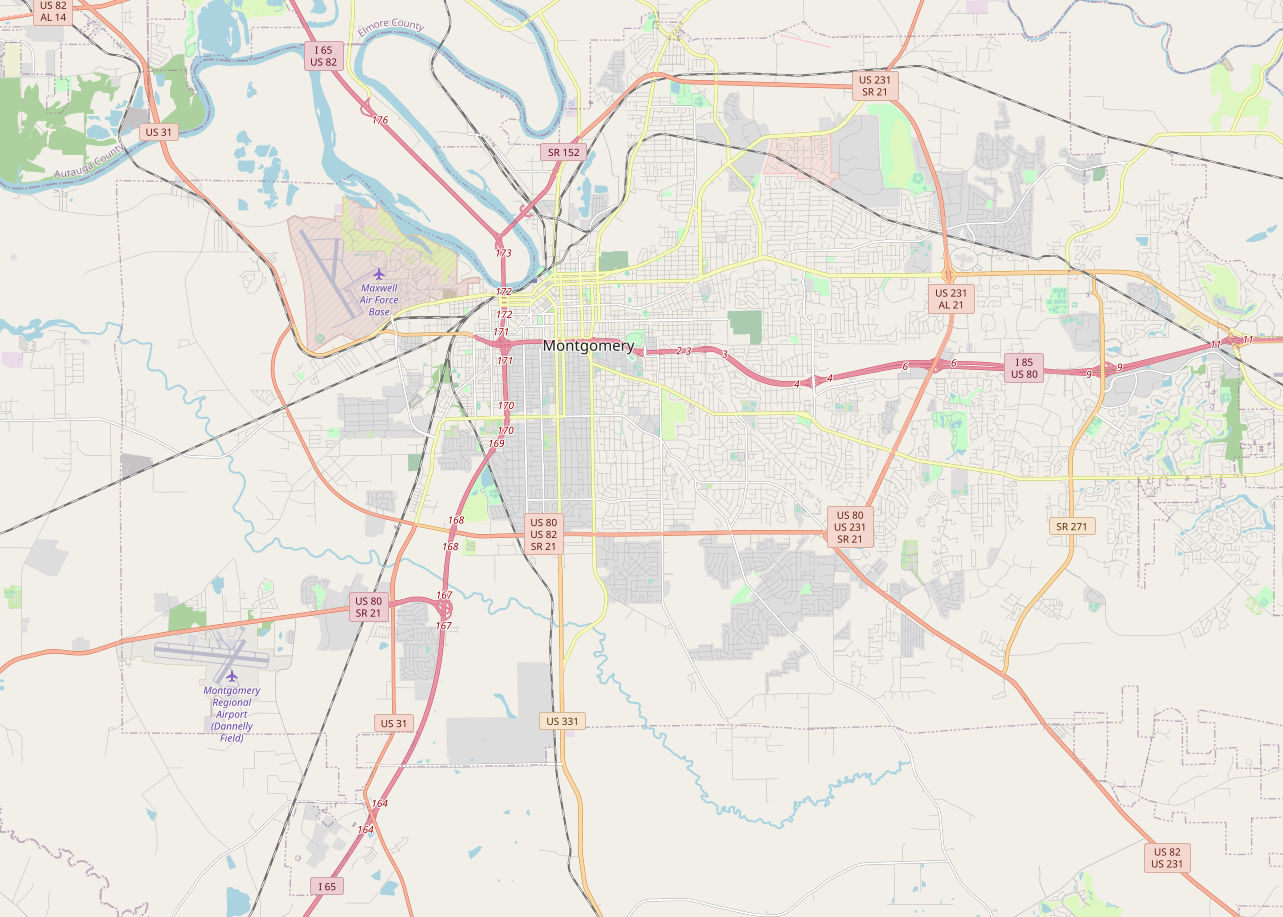
- Location within Montgomery, Alabama Location within Alabama Location within the United States
- Location: 320 and 334 Washington Ave. and 114--116 S. Hull St., Montgomery, Alabama
- Coordinates: 32°22′32″N 86°18′14″W
- Area: 1 acre (0.40 ha)
- Built: 1863
- Architect: T.C. Powers
- Architectural style: Greek Revival, Late Victorian, Queen Anne
- NRHP reference No.: 88003076
- Added to NRHP: December 29, 1988

The Dowe Historic District is a 1-acre (0.40 ha) historic district in Montgomery, Alabama. It includes 320 and 334 Washington Avenue and 114–116 South Hull Street. The architectural style of the four contributing buildings ranges from Greek Revival to Queen Anne. The district was placed on the National Register of Historic Places on December 29, 1988.
