= Durrr =

Durrr may refer to:

- Durrr Burger, the character from the 2017 video game Fortnite
- Tom Dwan, a nickname for the American professional poker player
