= Douwe Korff =

Dutch comparative and international lawyer

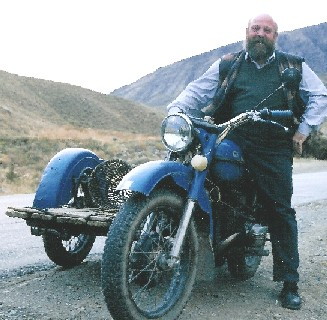
Douwe Korff

Douwe Korff (born 17 April 1951, in Amsterdam) has been professor of international law at London Metropolitan University since 2002. He is a Dutch comparative and international lawyer, specialising in human rights and data protection. In the 1970s, he graduated from the Free University in Amsterdam, Netherlands, and was researcher at the European University Institute in Florence, Italy. In the 1980s, he carried out human rights research at the Max Planck Institutes for comparative and international criminal law and for comparative and international public law in Freiburg im Breisgau and Heidelberg, Germany. In the 1990s, he taught international law and human rights at Maastricht University in the Netherlands, and the European Convention on Human Rights at the University of Essex, UK. In 2006, he was visiting professor at the Law faculty of the University of Rijeka, Croatia.

In the last ten years, he has carried out four major studies for the European Union's Directorate-General on the Internal Market, relating to the implementation of EC Directives harmonising data protection law in the EU and the EEA, and was involved in two studies for the Information Commissioner's Office. He has been cited as an expert in discussion of data protection policy. He is a member of the advisory council of the Foundation for Information Policy Research (FIPR), a leading UK think-tank on IT policy.

Since June 2013 he has been involved as a data protection, surveillance and international law expert in relation to mass surveillance disclosed by Edward Snowden, including at the German Parliament in 2014.

Similar expert evidence was given by Professor Korff on 8 April 2014 at the hearing of the Parliamentary Assembly of the Council of Europe (PACE) Committee on Legal Affairs and Human Rights on mass surveillance, with Dr Hansjoerg Geiger, former head of the German Secret Service, the BND, and Edward Snowden (by videolink), where Snowden answered in particular two questions Professor Korff had drafted for the PACE Rapporteur on the issue, Pieter Omtzigt, on data mining by the NSA and on spying by the NSA and GCHQ on Amnesty International, Human Rights Watch and other human rights organisations.

Professor Korff also provided expert evidence on the privacy and human rights implications of the Edward Snowden disclosures in the following political fora:

- Strasbourg, 28 January 2014 (European Data Protection Day). Professor Korff gave expert evidence (with Jacob Appelbaum and Christian Grothoff) at a side event to the winter session of the Parliamentary Assembly of the Council of Europe on the theme of “After Snowden: using law and technology to counter snooping”

- Strasbourg, 18 October 2013: Expert presentation at the 30th plenary of the Consultative Committee of the Council of Europe Convention on Data Protection, of a report he wrote entitled 'Report on The Use of the Internet and Related Services, Private Life & Data Protection: trends & technologies, threats & implications'

- Brussels, 14 October 2013: Expert presentation at the inquiry of the European Parliament's Civil Liberties Committee into NSA/GCHQ mass surveillance which was recorded by video
