= Róbert Novák =

Slovak footballer

Róbert Nóvak
Personal information
- Date of birth: 6 August 1970 (age 56)
- Position: Midfielder

Senior career*
Years	Team	Apps	(Gls)
1994–1996	TJ Slušovice		
1996–1997	ZTS Dubnica		
1997–1998	ŠK Slovan Bratislava		
1999	1. FC Košice		
2000–2004	FK Marila Příbram		
2004–2005	Artmedia Petržalka		
2005–2007	ZTS Dubnica		
- * Club domestic league appearances and goals

Róbert Nóvak (born 6 August 1970) is a retired Slovak football midfielder.
