= Jacek Kacprzak =

Polish footballer (born 1970)

Personal information
- Full name: Jacek Adam Kacprzak
- Date of birth: 23 December 1970 (age 55)
- Place of birth: Białobrzegi, Poland
- Height: 1.74 m (5 ft 9 in)
- Position: Midfielder

Team information
- Current team: Pilica Białobrzegi (chairman)

Senior career*
Years	Team	Apps	(Gls)
1986–87	Pilica Białobrzegi		
1987–1991	Radomiak Radom		
1991–1998	Legia Warsaw	134	(13)
1993–1994	→ Polonia Warsaw (loan)	22	(2)
1998	Larissa		
1999	Panetolikos		
1999	Aarhus	6	(1)
2000–2001	Dyskobolia Grodzisk Wielkopolski	52	(8)
2002	Radomiak Radom		
2002–2003	Górnik Polkowice	25	(4)
2003–2004	Ceramika Opoczno	21	(1)
2004–2007	Radomiak Radom	48+	(3+)
2007–2012	Pilica Białobrzegi		
2015–2018	Bar Ulubiona ETV Warsaw		

Managerial career
- 2007: Radomiak Radom
- Pilica Białobrzegi (interim)
- * Club domestic league appearances and goals

Jacek Adam Kacprzak (born 23 December 1970) is a Polish former professional footballer who played as a midfielder. He is currently the chairman of his hometown club Pilica Białobrzegi.

== Career ==
After playing in Greece, Kacprzak signed for Danish side Aarhus, but left after six months due to the long ball style of play.

== Honours ==
Legia Warsaw

- Ekstraklasa: 1994–95
- Polish Cup: 1994–95, 1996–97
- Polish Super Cup: 1994, 1997

Górnik Polkowice

- II liga: 2002–03
