= Dow process =

The Dow process may refer to:

- Dow process (bromine), a method of bromine extraction from brine
- Dow process (magnesium), a method of magnesium extraction from brine
- Dow process (phenol), a method of phenol production through the hydrolysis of chlorobenzene
