= Jung-il Doh =

South Korean English scholar (born 1941)

- 도정일
- Born: 1941 (age 84–85); Fukui Prefecture, Empire of Japan
- Education: Kyung Hee University
- Occupations: Scholar in English literature, humanities, literary critic, social critic

Jung-il Doh (Korean: 도정일; Hanja: 都正一; born 1941) is a South Korean scholar in humanities and English literature, a literary and social critic, and an educationist. He was a professor in the English department at Kyung Hee University where he taught literary theories and cultural studies. As a social critic, he has published essays and books criticizing on South Korea’s rapid turn toward an extreme consumerist society in the 1980s. Doh has also written about the importance of South Korea’s educational reform to cultivate responsible citizens of a democratic society. In 2001, Doh became the Executive Director of the Book Culture Foundation (책읽는사회문화재단). In 2011, he helped found the Humanitas College (후마니타스칼리지) at Kyung Hee University, where he advocated the necessity of humanities education in training students to become responsible members of the civil society. In 2016, Doh had been accused of having falsified his PhD degree obtained at University of Hawaii at Manoa in 1983. Doh admitted that he does not have a degree in English received from the university, but explained that this was due to his failure to submit the final copy of his dissertation after passing the PhD defense.

== Life and career ==
Doh was born in 1941 in Fukui Prefecture, Japan, during Japan's occupation of Korea. Doh and his family returned to Korea when he was five years old. In 1961, he enrolled in the English department of Kyung Hee University, where he acquired an interest in the philosophies of existentialism and world literature such as Camus, Dostoevsky.

In 1965, Doh worked as chief editor of the monthly magazine Sisa-yong-o-sa (시사영어사, the forerunner to YBM). He became the chief editor of overseas reports at the news agency Dong-Yang-Tong-Sin (동양통신) in 1971. In 1975, he moved to the United States to study American literature and culture at University of Hawaii at Manoa. In 1983, he begin teaching at the English department at Kyung Hee University. His courses focused mostly on contemporary literary theories, such as Marxism, structuralism, psychoanalysis, deconstructionism, and cultural studies. He retired from his professorship in 2006.

Since 2001, Doh has been the Executive Director of Book Culture Foundation (책읽는사회문화재단). In his position as the Executive Director, he has constantly emphasized the importance of reading for sustaining a healthy civil society. Working under the mission of providing people with better accessibility to books and of promoting reading habits, the Book Culture Foundation launched a project called “Miracle Library,” which has built twelve children libraries throughout South Korea.

In 2011, Doh became the first dean of the Humanitas College (후마니타스칼리지), formerly Liberal Arts College of Kyung Hee University which had been reorganized to strengthen its focus on social engagement, critical thinking, and general understanding of the field of humanities.

== Publications ==
- The Poet Cannot go to the Forest (시인은 숲으로 가지 못한다, 1994)
- Conversation (대담, 2005)
- Market-Totalitarianism and the Barbarism of Civilization (시장전체주의와 문명의 야만, 2008)
- The List of Things that are Uselessly Priceless (쓰잘데없이 고귀한 것들의 목록, 2014)
- Leaving a Trail Between the Stars (별들 사이에 길을 놓다, 2014)
- From the Age, Against the Age, For the Age (시대로부터, 시대에 맞서서, 시대를 위하여, 2021)
