= Tengiz Sichinava =

Georgian footballer (1972–2021)

Personal information
- Date of birth: 15 May 1972
- Place of birth: Sokhumi, Georgian SSR, Soviet Union
- Date of death: 4 March 2021 (aged 48)
- Height: 1.77 m (5 ft 10 in)
- Position: Midfielder

Senior career*
Years	Team	Apps	(Gls)
1989	Dinamo Sokhumi	2	(0)
1990–1993	Tskhumi Sokhumi	82	(1)
1993–2001	Dinamo Batumi	164	(13)
2001	Baltika Kaliningrad	13	(2)
2001–2003	Kristall Smolensk	60	(3)
2003	Sioni Bolnisi	11	(1)
2004	Lokomotivi Tbilisi	40	(4)
2005	Turan Tovuz	12	(1)
2006	MKT Araz	11	(0)
2006–2007	Sioni Bolnisi	6	(0)
Total		401	(25)

International career
1999–2000	Georgia	10	(0)

Managerial career
- 2014: Gagra
- * Club domestic league appearances and goals

Tengiz Sichinava (15 May 1972 – 4 March 2021) was a Georgian football player and manager, who played as a midfielder.

Sichinava left Georgia in 2001 for Russian First Division side Baltika Kaliningrad. In 2005, he left Georgia again for Azerbaijan side Turan Tovuz, then MKT Araz.

Sichinava made his Georgia national team debut on 4 September 1999.
