= Dowr, Chabahar =

Dowr دور
- Village
- Location within Iran
- Coordinates: 25°21′55″N 61°18′27″E
- Country: Iran
- Province: Sistan and Baluchestan
- County: Chabahar
- Bakhsh: Dashtiari
- Rural District: Sand-e Mir Suiyan

Population (2006)
  - Total: 408
- Time zone: UTC+3:30 (IRST)
  - Summer (DST): UTC+4:30 (IRDT)

Dowr (Persian: دور, also Romanized as Dūr) is a village in Sand-e Mir Suiyan Rural District, Dashtiari District, Chabahar County, Sistan and Baluchestan Province, Iran. At the 2006 census, its population was 408, in 75 families.
