= Dougher =

Dougher is a surname. Notable people with the surname include:

- Leslie Dougher, American politician
- Patrick Dougher, artist, musician, and art therapist
- Sarah Dougher (born 1967), American singer-songwriter, author, and teacher
