= Wilhelm Dürr the Younger =

German painter (1857–1900)

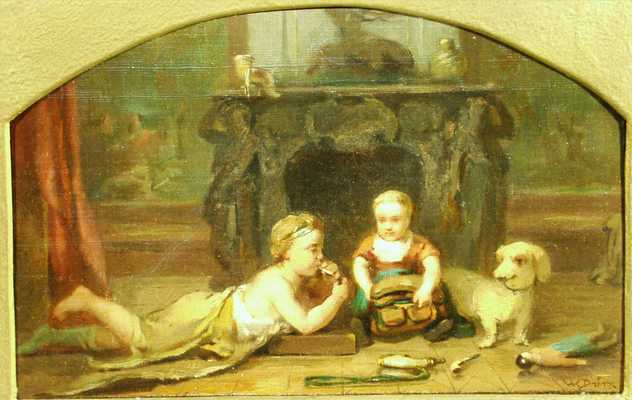
Two Children at Play, Oil on board, by Wilhelm Dürr the Younger

Wilhelm Dürr the Younger (24 August 1857, Freiburg im Breisgau, Baden – 23 February 1900, Munich) was a German painter and draughtsman, as well as a professor at the Academy of Fine Arts in Munich.

== Life ==
Dürr was the son of the painter Wilhelm Dürr the Elder (1815–1890) and his wife Berta Gruny.

After his first training with his father, he attended classes at the Munich Academy of Fine Arts in 1874. There he was trained and strongly influenced by Wilhelm von Diez. A major art exhibition held in Munich in 1883 proved to be the turning point for Dürr, who became acquainted with French open-air painting and the works of German artists such as Fritz von Uhde and Max Liebermann. He became famous in the 1880s for his still lifes and portraits.

Around 1890 Dürr lived in artists' colonies at Dachau and Innviertel to learn more about landscape painting. He was also responsible for furnishing several churches and other buildings in Freiburg and the surrounding area, following in his father's footsteps. In 1888, he won the Gold Medal at the Great Munich Art Exhibition for the image Madonna im Grünen. After this success, he became an assistant professor at the Munich Academy of Fine Arts and, in 1892, professor. There he taught mainly life classes. At the end of his life, he was seriously ill and only painted a few pictures.

In Dachau, Wilhelm-Dürr-Straße is named in honour of the painter.

== Works (selection) ==
- 1885 in collaboration with the painter Ludwig von Herterich he painted the main staircase in the Neues Schloss, seat of the Archdukes of Baden-Baden
- 1886 with his father, designed a window for Freiburg Münster (showing St. Hieronymus and Duke Albrecht VI)
- 1888 painted Madonna im Grünen

== Literature ==
- (In German) Greulich, Andreas: Dürr, Wilhelm (der Jüngere). In: Allgemeines Künstlerlexikon. Die Bildenden Künstler aller Zeiten und Völker (AKL). Vol. 30, p. 320. Saur, München 2001. ISBN 3-598-22770-1
