= Dir (union council) =

- Union Council
- Country: Pakistan
- Province: Khyber Pakhtunkhwa
- District: Upper Dir
- Time zone: UTC+5 (PST)

Dir is a Union Council (administrative subdivision) of Upper Dir District in the Khyber Pakhtunkhwa province of Pakistan.

== See also ==
- Upper Dir District
