= Jury duty (disambiguation) =

Jury duty is service as a juror in a legal proceeding.

Jury Duty may also refer to:

- Jury Duty (film), a 1995 comedy starring Pauly Shore
- "Jury Duty" (The Office), a television episode
- Jury Duty (2007 TV series), a syndicated reality series featuring celebrities serving as jurors
- Jury Duty (2023 TV series), an American docu-comedy
