= Digital Instrumentation Recorder =

Digital Instrumentation Recorder is a magnetic tape data storage format developed by Sony. It uses a ¾" wide tape, in a cassette with two reels, which is written and read with a helical scan process.

== Generations ==
=== D1 ===
- Up to 64 MB/s data transfer speed
- Up to 96 GB data capacity
- ANSI ID-1 standard
