= Madjid Ben Haddou =

Algerian footballer (born 1975)

Personal information
- Full name: Madjid Ben Haddou
- Date of birth: October 30, 1975 (age 50)
- Place of birth: Mers El Kébir, Algeria
- Height: 1.77 m (5 ft 10 in)
- Position: Midfielder

Youth career
- Nice

Senior career*
Years	Team	Apps	(Gls)
1997–2004	Nice	52	(1)
1999–2000	→ Grenoble (loan)	18	(1)
- * Club domestic league appearances and goals

Madjid Ben Haddou (born October 30, 1975) is a former Algerian football player who spent the majority of his playing career with OGC Nice.

Ben Haddou spent the 1999–2000 season on loan with Grenoble in the Championnat National, making 18 appearances and scoring 1 goal.

He had a brief unsuccessful trial with Grimsby Town in 2005.
