= Duty (criminal law) =

In United States criminal law, duty is an obligation to act under which failure to act (omission), results in criminal liability. Such a duty may arise by a person's status in relation to another, by statute, by contract, by voluntarily acting so as to isolate someone from help by others, and by creating a danger.

"There are at least four situations in which the failure to act may constitute breach of a legal duty. One can be held criminally liable: first, where a statute imposes a duty to care for another; second, where one stands in a certain status relationship to another; third, where one has assumed a contractual duty to care for another; and fourth, where one has voluntarily assumed the care of another and so secluded the helpless person as to prevent others from rendering aid."

"When a person puts another in a position of danger, he creates for himself a duty to safeguard or rescue the person from that danger... Thus, when a person places another in danger, fails to safeguard or rescue him and he dies, such omission is sufficient to support criminal liability."
