= Douwe =

Douwe or Douw is a Dutch given name of West Frisian origin, probably meaning "dove" (Frisian: dou). Notable people with the name include:

- Douwe Amels (born 1991), Dutch athlete
- Douwe Aukes (1612–1668), Frisian sea captain of the Dutch East India Company
- Douwe Blumberg, Dutch sculptor
- Douwe Bob (born 1992), Dutch singer-songwriter
- Douwe Breimer (born 1943), Dutch pharmacologist
- Douwe Juwes de Dowe (1608–1662), Dutch painter
- Douwe Eisenga (born 1961), Dutch composer
- Douwe Korff (born 1951), Dutch legal scholar
- Douwe Sirtema van Grovestins (1710–1778), Frisian courtier
- Douw Steyn (1952–2025), South African billionaire businessman
- Douwe de Vries (born 1982), Dutch marathon and long track speed skater

== See also ==
- Douwe Egberts, coffee brand named after Douwe Egberts de Jong (1755–1806), Frisian-Dutch merchant and coffee roaster
