= Doh =

Doh or variations may refer to:

== People ==
- Félix Doh (died 2003), rebel leader in Côte d'Ivoire
- Jung-il Doh (born 1941), South Korean academic
- Marius Trésor Doh (born 2003), footballer from Côte d'Ivoire

== Places ==
- Doh, Ivory Coast
- Doh, Măeriște, Romania
- Doh (crater), on Jupiter's moon Callisto

== Organisations ==
- Department of Health
- Department of Highways (disambiguation)

== Other uses ==
- "D'oh!", a catchphrase of Homer Simpson, a fictional character from the animated sitcom The Simpsons
- DOH, a fictional entity in Arkanoid video games
- Doh, bark of the Arenga pinnata palm
- DNS over HTTPS (DoH), an internet protocol
- 2,5-Dimethoxyamphetamine, or DOH, a drug
- Dong language (Nigeria), ISO 639-3 language code doh
- Hamad International Airport in Doha, Qatar, IATA code DOH

== See also ==
- Do (disambiguation)
- Doe (disambiguation)
- Dough (disambiguation)
- DOHH (disambiguation)
- C (musical note), or Do
- Dan Doh!!, Japanese sports manga series
- DfT Operator, formerly DfT OLR Holdings Limited (DOHL), UK government operator of last resort for nationalised rail franchises
- Play-Doh, a modeling compound
