= Empress Dou =

Empress Dou may refer to 3 Han dynasty empresses, who all reigned as empresses dowager:

- Empress Dou (Wen) (died 135 BC), wife of Emperor Wen of Han and mother of Emperor Jing of Han
- Empress Zhangde (died 97), wife of Emperor of Zhang of Han
- Empress Dou Miao (died 172), third wife of Emperor Huan of Han
