= Laurent Dauwe =

Belgian footballer

Personal information
- Date of birth: 16 January 1966 (age 60)
- Place of birth: Brussels
- Position: Midfielder

Senior career*
Years	Team	Apps	(Gls)
1984–1992	K.A.A. Gent		
1992–1994	K.V. Kortrijk		
1994–1997	R.E. Mouscron		
1997–1998	K.F.C. Germinal Ekeren	29	(2)
1998	K.V.C. Westerlo	13	(2)
1999	K.V. Oostende	11	(0)
1999–2000	Royal Antwerp F.C.	10	(0)
2000–2001	R.R.C. Gent-Zeehaven	11	(2)
- * Club domestic league appearances and goals

Laurent Dauwe (born 16 January 1966) is a retired Belgian football midfielder.
