= Davenport v. Dows =

- Supreme Court of the United States

Decided March 18, 1873
- Full case name: Davenport v. Dows
- Citations: 85 U.S. 626 (more) 18 Wall. 626; 21 L. Ed. 938; 1873 U.S. LEXIS 1336

Court membership
- Chief Justice Salmon P. Chase Associate Justices Nathan Clifford · Noah H. Swayne; Samuel F. Miller · David Davis; Stephen J. Field · William Strong; Joseph P. Bradley · Ward Hunt

Case opinion
- Majority: Davis, joined by a unanimous court

Davenport v. Dows, 85 U.S. (18 Wall.) 626 (1873), is a US corporate law case concerning shareholder derivative suits.

== Background ==
Dows, a shareholder in the Chicago, Rock Island, and Pacific Railroad, brought suit on behalf of himself and other shareholders against the city of Davenport, challenging a city property tax levied against the railroad as illegal. Dows claimed a right to sue as a shareholder on the grounds that the railroad had neglected and refused to do so. After the district court ruled in favor of Dows and perpetually enjoined collection of the tax, Davenport appealed, arguing in part that Dows should have made the railroad a party to the case.

== Judgment ==
In an opinion by Justice David Davis, the court held unanimously that while shareholders could bring suits on behalf of corporations, the corporation must be made a party to the action. Justice Davis wrote that this was necessary because any action brought by a shareholder would ultimately involve the corporation. Moreover, if the corporation was not made a party and the suit failed, the corporation could then bring a later suit on the same issue. To avoid this result, the court held that it would not "settle a question in which the corporation is the essential party in interest, unless it is a party to the litigation."

The court reversed the lower court's overruling of Davenport's demurrer and remanded the case for further proceedings.

== See also ==
- United States corporate law
