= Dou =

DOU or Dou may refer to:

- Dou (surname) (窦/竇), a Chinese surname
  - Empress Dou (disambiguation), Chinese empresses surnamed Dou
- Degree of unsaturation, in chemistry
- Dō (armour) (胴), a Japanese armour
- Dhammakaya Open University, near Bangkok, Thailand
- Diário Oficial da União, the official journal of the federal government of Brazil
- Gerrit Dou (1613–1675), Dutch Golden Age painter
- Dou (volume), a traditional Chinese unit of measurement, equivalent to a decaliter
- Dhow, a sailing vessel from the Indian Ocean
- Dǒu (斗) or Dipper, a Chinese constellation

== See also ==
- Dou dizhu, a Chinese card game
