= Thibault Scotto =

French footballer (born 1978)

Personal information
- Full name: Thibault Scotto di Porfirio
- Date of birth: 17 September 1978 (age 48)
- Place of birth: Toulon, France
- Height: 1.77 m (5 ft 9 1/2 in)
- Positions: Defender; midfielder

Team information
- Current team: AS Cannes
- Number: 23

Senior career*
Years	Team	Apps	(Gls)
1995–2007	OGC Nice	126	(1)
1999–2000	→ FC Martigues (loan)	9	(0)
2005–2006	→ Amiens SC (loan)	31	(0)
2007–2010	FC Istres	89	(1)
2010–	AS Cannes	1	(0)
- * Club domestic league appearances and goals as of 07:44, 16 August 2010 (UTC)

Thibault Scotto di Porfirio (born 17 September 1978), known as Thibault Scotto, is a French former professional footballer who played as a defender or a midfielder.
