= Douwe Juwes de Dowe =

Dutch painter (1608–1662)

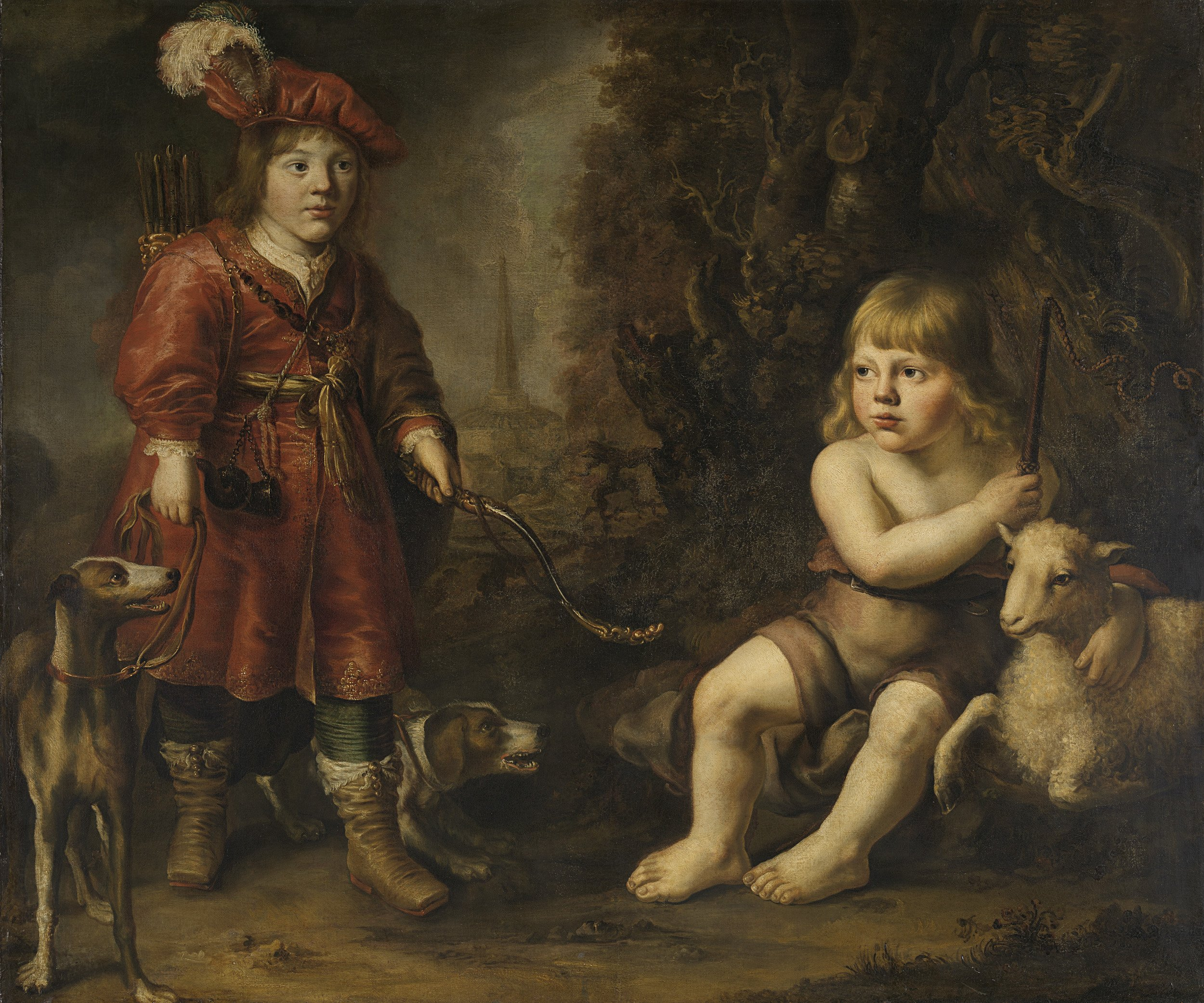
Portrait of two boys, one dressed as a hunter, and one dressed as St. John the Baptist, 1647, by de Dowe

Douwe Juwes de Dowe (1608 – 1662) was a Dutch Golden Age painter from the Dutch Republic.

de Dowe was born in 1608, in Leeuwarden. He was influenced by the Gouda stained glass works of the painter Dirck Reiniersz. van der Douw. He is known for portraits in Leeuwarden between 1623 and 1661. He died in 1662, aged 53 or 54.
