= Dow =

Dow may refer to:

== Business ==
- Dow Jones Industrial Average, or simply the Dow, an American stock market index
- Dow Inc., an American commodity chemical company
  - Dow Chemical Company, a subsidiary, an American multinational chemical corporation
- Dow Breweries, a former Canadian brewing company

== Linguistics ==
- Dow language of the Dow people of Brazil
- dow, the ISO 639-3 code for the Doyayo language of Cameroon

== People and characters ==
- Dow people, an ethnic group of Brazil
- Dow (surname), including a list of people with the name
- Dow Cook, a fictional character in the Fusion comics series
- Dow Finsterwald (1929–2022), American golfer

== Places ==
- County Down, Northern Ireland, Chapman code DOW

=== Antarctica ===
- Dow Nunatak, Antarctica
- Dow Peak, Antarctica

=== Trinidad and Tobago ===
- Dow Village, Couva, Trinidad and Tobago
- Dow Village, South Oropouche, Trinidad and Tobago

=== United States ===
- Dow, Illinois
- Dow City, Iowa
- Dow, Kentucky
- Downingtown station, Pennsylvania, Amtrak station code DOW

== Groups, organizations ==
- Dow University of Health Sciences, in Pakistan
- Down Orange Welfare, Ulster loyalist vigilante group in Northern Ireland
- Department of War (disambiguation)
  - United States Department of War, an extinct department of the United States government
  - United States Department of Defense, as a secondary, unofficial title

=== Divisions of Wildlife ===
- Alabama Division of Wildlife (see Alabama Department of Conservation and Natural Resources#Wildlife and Freshwater Fisheries)
- Colorado Division of Wildlife now part of Colorado Parks and Wildlife
- Florida Division of Wildlife, now merged into the Fish and Wildlife Research Institute
- Louisiana Department of Wildlife and Fisheries
- Nevada Department of Wildlife
- Utah Division of Wildlife Resources

== Other uses ==
- Deep ocean water, a marine term
- Died of wounds, a military casualty classification
- Doppler on Wheels, devices used for meteorological research
- Dow Tennis Classic, an ITF Women's Circuit tennis tournament

== See also ==
- Dhow, a traditional sailing ship
- Dow Jones (disambiguation)
- Dow process (disambiguation)
- Dow v. United States, a 1915 United States Court of Appeals case
- Dowe (disambiguation)
- Dows (disambiguation)
