= Department of Highways =

Department of Highways or variations, may refer to:

== Government agencies ==
=== In the United States ===
- Department of Highways, a precursor agency of the Alaska Department of Transportation & Public Facilities
- Department of Highways, a precursor agency of the California Department of Transportation
- Department of Highways, a precursor agency of the Colorado Department of Transportation
- Department of Highways, a precursor agency of the Idaho Transportation Department
- Department of Highways, a precursor agency of the Indiana Department of Transportation
- Department of Highways, a government agency under the Kentucky Transportation Cabinet
- Department of Highways, a precursor agency of the Minnesota Department of Transportation
- Department of Highways, a precursor agency of the Montana Department of Transportation
- Department of Highways, a precursor agency of the Nevada Department of Transportation
- Department of Highways, a precursor agency of the New York State Department of Transportation
- Department of Highways, a precursor agency of the Ohio Department of Transportation
- Department of Highways, a precursor agency of the Oklahoma Department of Transportation
- Department of Highways, a precursor agency of the Pennsylvania Department of Transportation
- Department of Highways, a precursor agency of the Vermont Agency of Transportation
- Department of Highways, a precursor agency of the Virginia Department of Transportation
- Department of Highways, a precursor agency of the Washington State Department of Transportation
- Department of Highways, a precursor agency of the West Virginia Department of Transportation

=== In Canada ===
- Department of Highways, a precursor agency of the Ministry of Transportation of Ontario
- Department of Highways, a precursor agency of the Ministry of Highways and Infrastructure (Saskatchewan)

=== In Thailand ===
- Department of Highways, a government agency under the Ministry of Transport (Thailand)

== Other uses ==
- Department of Highways Futsal Club, a futsal club in Thailand

== See also ==
- Ministry of Road Transport and Highways (India)
  - Minister of Road Transport and Highways
- Department of Highways and Minor Ports (Tamil Nadu), a department of the government of Tamil Nadu, India
- Department of Highways, Ports and Properties, a precursor agency of the Department of Infrastructure of the Isle of Man
- Ministry of Highways, Ports & Shipping, a former Sri Lankan government ministry
