= Mickaël Rol =

French footballer (born 1976)

Personal information
- Full name: Mickaël Rol
- Date of birth: 30 October 1976 (age 49)
- Place of birth: Lyon, France
- Height: 1.84 m (6 ft 0 in)
- Positions: Defender; defensive midfielder

Senior career*
Years	Team	Apps	(Gls)
1995–1997	Lyon B	29	(1)
1997–1999	Nice	41	(0)
1999–2002	Chamois Niortais	52	(0)
2002–2004	Cherbourg	40	(0)
2004–2005	Valence	15	(0)
2005–2007	Montluçon	56	(3)
2007–2010	Évian Thonon Gaillard		
- * Club domestic league appearances and goals

Mickaël Rol (born 30 October 1976) is a former professional footballer who played as a defender or defensive midfielder.

== Post-playing career ==
After his retirement from playing, Rol ended up working for Danone.
