= Dominique Aulanier =

French footballer (1973–2020)

Personal information
- Full name: Dominique Gerard Marie Aulanier
- Date of birth: 13 September 1973
- Place of birth: Saint-Chamond, France
- Date of death: 31 July 2020 (aged 46)
- Place of death: Portiragnes, France
- Height: 1.77 m (5 ft 10 in)
- Position: Midfielder

Senior career*
Years	Team	Apps	(Gls)
1991–1994	Saint-Étienne B		
1994–1997	Saint-Étienne	76	(9)
1997–2002	Nice	164	(22)
1998	→ Nîmes (loan)	16	(2)
2002–2003	Cannes	12	(3)
2003	Estoril		
2003–2004	Sion		
2004–2005	Cannes	30	(10)
2005–2006	Sète	30	(3)
2006–2008	PCAC Sète		
2008–2009	Sète	6	(1)
2009–2011	Béziers		
Total		334+	(50+)
- * Club domestic league appearances and goals

Dominique Aulanier (13 September 1973 – 31 July 2020) was a French professional footballer who played as a midfielder.

== Career ==
Born in Saint-Chamond, Aulanier played for Saint-Étienne, Nice, Nîmes, Cannes, Estoril, Sion, Sète, PCAC Sète and Béziers.

He died on 31 July 2020, aged 46.
