= Dau =

Dau or DAU may refer to:

- Club Deportivo Árabe Unido
- Daily active users, a performance metric for the success of an Internet product
- Dau (surname)
- Dau (film), a biography of physicist Lev Landau
- DAU (project), a cross-sectional cinema and art project
- Dau, a barangay in Mabalacat, Pampanga, Philippines
- Dauair (ICAO code), a small, short-lived German airline
- Da'u County, or Dawu County, in Sichuan, China
- Daru Airport (IATA code), airport in Daru, Papua New Guinea
- Defense Acquisition University, a university under the United States Department of Defense located in Fort Belvoir, Virginia
