= Duerr =

Duerr may refer to:

- Al Duerr (born 1951), Canadian politician
- Crescentius Richard Duerr (1922–2005), De La Salle Brother, president of De La Salle University in the Philippines
- Edwin Duerr (1904–1985), theater and radio director
- Justin Duerr (born 1976), American artist

== See also ==
- Dürr
- F. Duerr & Sons
