= Do Nothing =

Do Nothing may refer to:

- "Do Nothing" (song), a 1980 single by The Specials included on the album More Specials
- Do Nothing (band), a British post-punk band from Nottingham
- Do Nothing Congress, an epithet applied to the 80th United States Congress (1947–49)
- Do Nothing Farming, an ecological farming approach established by Masanobu Fukuoka (1913–2008)
- Do nothing grinder (AKA Kentucky do-nothing, or do nothing machine), a novelty or toy version of the Trammel of Archimedes, which draws an ellipse
- Do nothing instruction (AKA NOP or NOOP), in computer programming
- Do nothing kings, English name for the rois fainéants of the later kings of the Merovingian dynasty (7th and 8th centuries AD)

== See also ==
- Do (disambiguation)
- DO (disambiguation)
- D0 (disambiguation) (D followed by zero)
- Doe (disambiguation)
- Doo (disambiguation)
- Doh (disambiguation)
- Do Nothing till You Hear from Me (disambiguation)
