= Doo =

Doo or DOO may refer to:

== People ==
- George Thomas Doo (1800–1886), English engraver
- Unui Doo (c. 1874–1940), Chinese New Zealand businesswoman and shopkeeper
- Doo Aphane (fl. from 2007), Swazi lawyer and women's rights campaigner
- Doo Hoi Kem (born 1996), Hong Kong table tennis player
- Doo Kyung-min (born 1991), South Korean basketball player

== Other uses ==
- BRP Inc. (stock ticker DOO), a Canadian manufacturer of snowmobiles, all-terrain vehicles, side by sides, motorcycles, and personal watercraft
- Doo (bird), the dove in Scottish English
- Doo (film), a 2010 Tamil-language film
- Driver-only operation, of a public transport vehicle without a conductor or guard present
- d.o.o., abbreviation of translation of "private limited company" in several countries

== See also ==
- Do (disambiguation)
- Doe (disambiguation)
- Doh (disambiguation)
- Doo rag (disambiguation)
- Doo-doo
- Doo Town, a Tasmanian holiday village
- Priso a Doo and Elame a Doo, 18th/19th century rulers of Duala people
