= Kefas =

Kefas is both a masculine given name and a surname. Notable people with the name include:

- Kefas Japhet (fl. from 2022), Nigerian politician
- Agbu Kefas (born 1970), Nigerian politician
- Ibrahim Kefas (1948–2021), Nigerian politician and Air Force officer

== See also ==
- Cephas (disambiguation)
