= Do =

Do, DO or D.O. may refer to:

== People ==
- Do (surname), including a list of people with the surname
  - Đỗ, a Vietnamese family name
- Do (singer) (Dominique Rijpma van Hulst, born 1981), Dutch singer
- D.O. (entertainer) (Doh Kyung-soo, born 1993), South Korean singer and actor
- D.O. (rapper) (a.k.a. Defy the Odds; Duane Gibson, fl. from 2000), Canadian rapper
- Marshall Applewhite (1931–1997), also known as Do, American cult leader

== Arts, entertainment and media ==
=== Music ===
- Do (Do album), 2004
- Do (Psychostick album), 2018
- "Do", a song by the White Stripes from the album The White Stripes, 1999
- "Do", a song by Moka Only from the album Vermilion, 2007
- Do, the first syllable of the scale in solfège; maps to C in traditional fixed do
- Do, a type of buk drum in Korean ritual music
- The Dø, a French–Finnish indie pop band
- Delta Omicron, an international music fraternity

=== Other uses in arts, entertainment and media ===
- The DO, an online magazine of the American Osteopathic Association
- Wazir (film), 2016, working title Do

== Language ==
- Do-support, in English grammar, the use of the auxiliary verb do to form questions
- Do (kana), or To, a mora symbol in Japanese writing
- do., abbreviation for ditto

== Places ==
- Do (province), a Korean and Japanese administrative division
  - Do (administrative division), in North and South Korea
- Do, Stolac, Bosnia and Herzegovina
- Do (Hadžići), Bosnia and Herzegovina
- Do, Stolac, Bosnia and Herzegovina
- Do (Trebinje), Bosnia and Herzegovina
- Dô, a coalition of villages in modern-day Mali
- Do, Ivory Coast, or Doh
- Dominican Republic, ISO 3166 code DO

== Science and technology ==
=== Medicine and earth science ===
- Delta Omega, an American public health honorary society
- Doctor of Osteopathic Medicine (DO)
- Dissolved oxygen, oxygen saturation in aquatic environments
- Dansgaard–Oeschger event, or D–O event, in climate science

=== Computing ===
- .do, the country code top level domain for the Dominican Republic
- GNOME Do, an application launcher for Linux

== Transportation ==
- Do, several aircraft models by Dornier Flugzeugwerke
- Dominicana de Aviación (1944–1995; IATA airline code DO), the first flag carrier of the Dominican Republic

== Other uses ==
- Dō, the torso protection in bōgu, kendo armour
- Dō (philosophy), a doctrine or lifestyle in Japanese and Korean cultures
- Denominación de origen, a geographical indication system for food and wine in Portugal, Spain and Latin America
- Directorate of Operations (CIA) of the United States Central Intelligence Agency
- Do, the number twelve in the duodecimal system

== See also ==
- Dō (disambiguation)
- D/O (disambiguation)
- D0 (disambiguation) (D followed by zero)
- Doe (disambiguation)
- Doo (disambiguation)
- Doh (disambiguation)
- Dao or Dao, the natural way of the universe, as conceived in East Asian philosophy and religion
