= Doe =

Doe, DoE, or DOE may refer to:

== Arts, entertainment and media ==
- Doe (band), a British indie rock band
- "Doe", a song by the Breeders from the 1990 album Pod
- Defying Ocean's End, a 2004 book and global agenda for action in marine conservation
- Dictionary of Old English, published by University of Toronto

== Businesses and organisations ==
- Dank of England (DOE), a record label, with accessories
- Democracy and Development through Unity (Democratie en Ontwikkeling in Eenheid, DOE), a political party in Suriname
- Department of Education, a government department
- Department of Energy, a government department
- Department of the Environment, a government department
- DoE, local expression for the Roads Service of Northern Ireland, now part of Department for Infrastructure

== People ==
- Doe (surname), including a list of people with the name
- Doe people, an ethnic and linguistic group in northern coastal Tanzania
- John Doe and Jane Doe, multiple-use placeholder names

== Science and technology ==
- Doe, an animal name for adult females of several species
- Diffractive optical element, such as a multifocal diffractive lens
- Distributed Objects Everywhere, a distributed computing project by Sun Microsystems
- Design of experiments, a design technique that aims to describe and explain how a system behaves

== Other uses ==
- Doe language, a Bantu language of the Pwani region of Tanzania
- Doe River, in Tennessee, U.S.
- Duke of Edinburgh (DoE), a dukedom associated with Edinburgh, UK

== See also ==
- Do (disambiguation)
- Doh (disambiguation)
- Doo (disambiguation)
- John Doe (disambiguation)
- Dough, a thick, malleable, sometimes elastic, paste
- Duke of Edinburgh (disambiguation) (DofE)
