= Cephas =

Cephas may refer to:

== Religion ==
- The title of Saint Peter
- Diocese of Cephas, an ancient episcopal seat of the Roman province of Mesopotamia, in present-day Tur Abdin, Turkey
- Cephas of Iconium, among the Seventy Disciples of Jesus, bishop of Iconium or Colophon, Pamphylia
- Moses Bar Cephas or Moses Bar-Kepha (c. 813–903), Syriac writer and bishop of the Syriac Orthodox Church

== People ==
=== Given name ===
- Cephas Yao Agbemenu (born 1951), Ghanaian sculptor and a traditional African wood carver and Art Professor
- Céphas Bansah (born 1948), Ngoryifia ("developmental chief") of the Gbi Traditional area of Hohoe, Ghana
- Cephas Chimedza (born 1984), Zimbabwean footballer
- Cephas Lemba (born 1970), Zambian sprinter
- Cephas Lumina, Zambian lawyer and human rights expert
- Cephas Malele (born 1994), Angolan-born Swiss footballer
- Cephas Matafi (born 1971), Zimbabwean long-distance runner
- Cephas Mark (1872–1942), Canadian druggist and political figure
- Cephas B. Moomaw (1849–1915), American lawyer, judge, and politician
- Cephas Msipa (1931–2016), Zimbabwean politician
- Cephas Pasipamiri, Zimbabwean long distance and marathon runner
- Cephas Quested, leader of the Aldington Gang, a 19th-century band of smugglers in England
- Cephas Thompson (1775–1856), American itinerant portrait painter
- Cephas Washburn (1793–1860), Christian missionary and educator
- Cephas Zhuwao (born 1984), Zimbabwean cricketer

=== Middle name ===
- Collen Cephas Gwiyo, Zimbabwean politician and deputy secretary general of the Zimbabwe Congress
- Edward Cephas John Stevens (1837–1915), New Zealand politician
- Jasmine Cephas Jones (born 1989), American actress
- Ron Cephas Jones (1957-2023), American actor

=== Surname ===
- Diana Cephas, African American plaintiff in freedom suit
- Kassian Cephas (1845–1912), Javanese photographer
- McColm Cephas (born 1978), Liberian footballer

== Other uses ==
- Cephas & Wiggins, an American acoustic blues duo
