= Cooke's Building =

Grade II listed building in Cumbria, England

Coordinates: 54.1162143°N 3.2270377°W

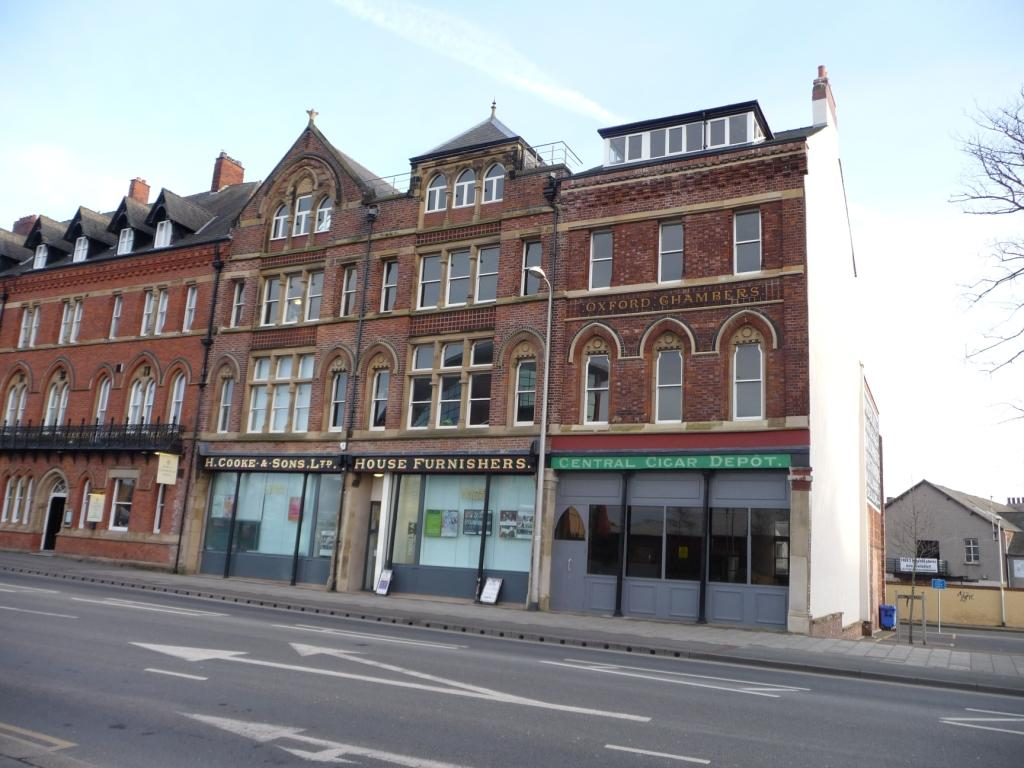
Cooke's Building (centre) in 2015

Cooke's Building is a Grade II listed building located at 104 Abbey Road in Barrow-in-Furness, Cumbria, England.

Designed by Howard Evans for businessman Henry Whiteside, Cooke's Building was built in 1875. It is a five-storey building, including a basement and attic. It served as a furniture store for the majority of its history up until 1959 when its owners, 'H Cooke and Sons' entered liquidation.

During the 1980s and 1990s, the basement of the Cooke's Building served as the Sub Zero nightclub, but lay vacant throughout the 2000s. In 2012, a £2 million renovation was completed on behalf of Barrow Borough Council. Signal Film & Media, an arts-focused charity, became the primary tenants of Cooke's Building, using it as studios and offices. Today it is called ‘Cooke’s Studios’ and houses many of Barrow’s arts, culture and media organisation.

The building is bound by two other Grade II listed buildings – The Duke of Edinburgh Hotel and Oxford Chambers, the latter of which was formerly jointly-listed with Cooke's Building.
