= 1 Corinthians 15 =

15th chapter of the First Epistle to the Corinthians

- ← chapter 14 chapter 16 →
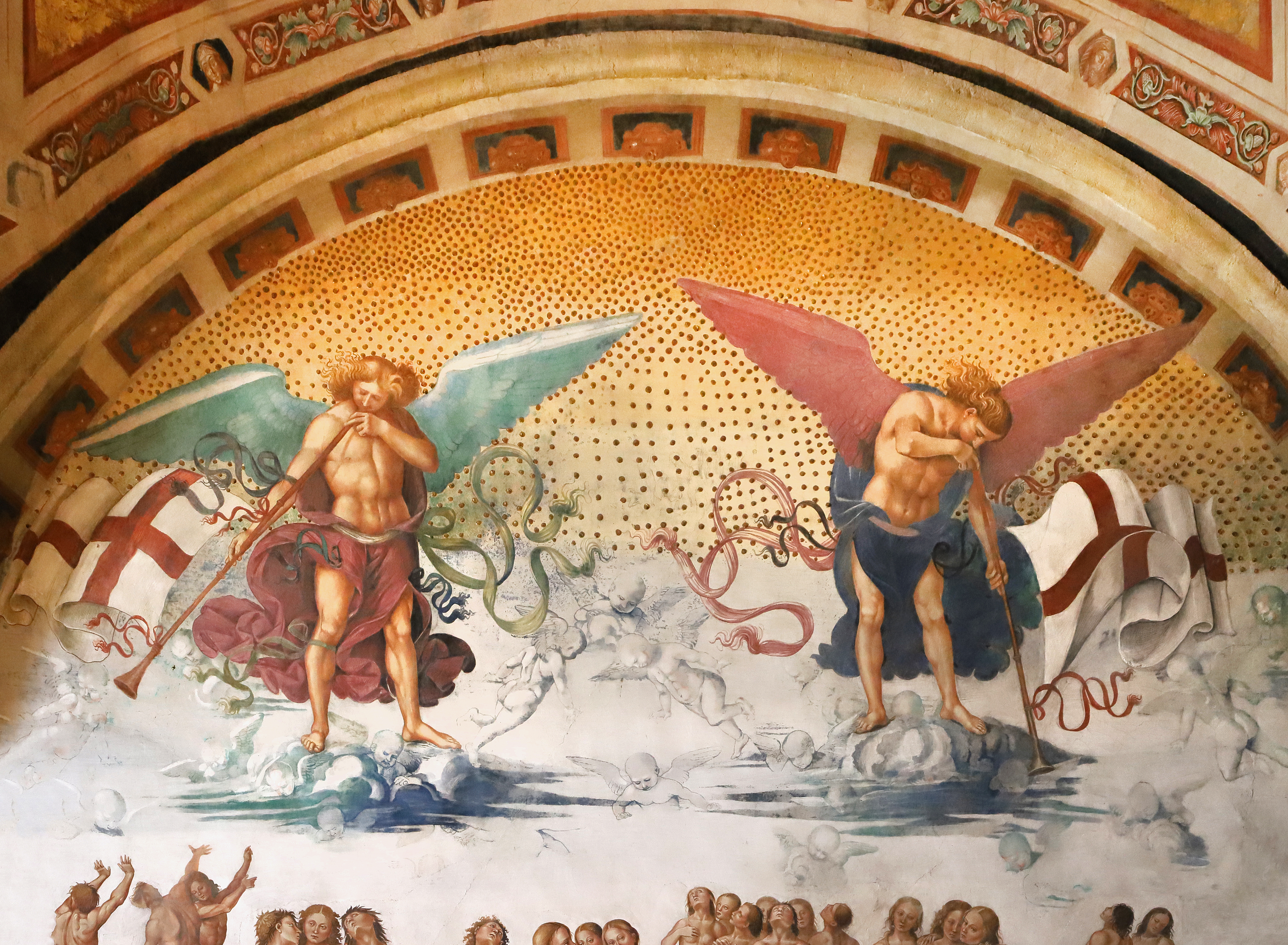
- Resurrection of the Flesh by Luca Signorelli (1499–1502), San Brizio Chapel, Orvieto Cathedral
- Book: First Epistle to the Corinthians
- Category: Pauline epistles
- Christian Bible part: New Testament
- Order in the Christian part: 7

1 Corinthians 15 is the fifteenth chapter of the First Epistle to the Corinthians in the New Testament of the Christian Bible, written by Paul the Apostle at Ephesus in the mid-50s AD. The longest sustained discussion of resurrection in the New Testament, it responds to members of the Corinthian church who denied the resurrection of the dead, arguing from the resurrection of Jesus that believers also will be raised, and describing the transformation of the body at the end of the age. The chapter preserves an early creedal summary of the Christian message (verses 3 to 8) that is widely regarded as a tradition older than Paul's letters and is commonly dated to within a few years of the crucifixion, which has made it a principal source in historical study of the resurrection. The chapter is also the source of several phrases well known in English, among them "O death, where is thy sting?" Passages from the chapter are appointed for Christian funeral liturgy and are set to music in Handel's Messiah and Brahms's German Requiem.

== Text ==
The original text was written in Koine Greek. This chapter is divided into 58 verses.

== Composition and context ==
The chapter belongs to the letter that Paul wrote to the church at Corinth in the mid-50s AD. Anthony C. Thiselton, following Karl Barth, regards it as "the close and crown of the whole epistle", tied to the letter's recurring concern with divine grace. Hans Conzelmann, a critical scholar, takes the opposite view, treating the chapter as a self-contained treatise on the resurrection and doubting its original connection to the rest of the letter, a position bound up with theories that 1 Corinthians combines more than one letter (see Unity of the First Epistle to the Corinthians). Fitzmyer defends the chapter's integrity and describes it as a well-defined treatise in four parts: the kerygma (verses 1 to 11), the argument that the resurrection of believers follows from Christ's (verses 12 to 34), the manner of the resurrection (verses 35 to 49), and the final victory over death (verses 50 to 58).

=== The Corinthian denial ===
Paul writes because "some" at Corinth were saying "there is no resurrection of the dead" (verse 12), and much of the chapter is directed against that view and its consequences. What exactly they denied is disputed. Thiselton surveys several overlapping reconstructions and concludes that no single one excludes the others, and that "some" may point to more than one group; most scholars agree that few if any denied the resurrection of Christ himself. A common view is that the objection was to the resurrection of the body, since in a Greek setting the immortality of the soul was the familiar form of afterlife, whereas Paul's hope of bodily resurrection derives from Jewish eschatology; Barrett connects the denial with an incipient Gnosticism at Corinth, and Fitzmyer, following Conzelmann, holds that the Corinthians doubted not that God could raise the dead but, "as Greeks", what such a resurrection was for. Another reconstruction, going back to John Chrysostom and Luther, is that the Corinthians held an "over-realized" eschatology in which the resurrection had in some sense already occurred (compare 2 Timothy 2:18); Conzelmann cautions that "we do not know so much about the Corinthian views". N. T. Wright rejects the over-realized reading and holds that the objection came from former pagans denying a future bodily resurrection on ordinary Greco-Roman grounds, since their culture took for granted that the dead do not return to bodily life; he argues that the terms ἐγείρω ("raise") and ἀνάστασις ("resurrection") denoted a return to bodily life rather than survival without a body, so that an argument for the immortality of the soul would have been unnecessary at Corinth.

== Summary ==
Paul first recalls the gospel he had preached, quoting a creed transmitted to him that Christ died for sins, was buried, was raised on the third day and appeared to named witnesses, and adding himself as the last to whom the risen Christ appeared (verses 1 to 11). He then argues that if the dead are not raised then Christ has not been raised, and Christian faith is worthless, whereas in fact Christ has been raised as the indication of those who will follow, so that at his coming he will reign until death, the last enemy, is destroyed and God is "all in all" (verses 12 to 28). After supporting arguments drawn from practice and from his own dangers (verses 29 to 34), Paul answers the question of how the dead are raised: as a seed is transformed into a plant, the body is "sown" perishable and raised imperishable, a "natural body" giving way to a "spiritual body", with Christ the "last Adam" as the pattern of the risen (verses 35 to 49). Finally he discloses a "mystery": not all will die, but all will be changed "in the twinkling of an eye, at the last trumpet", when death is swallowed up in victory (verses 50 to 58).

== Interpretation ==
=== The early Christian creed (verses 3–8) ===
For I handed on to you as of first importance what I in turn had received: that Christ died for our sins in accordance with the scriptures and that he was buried and that he was raised on the third day in accordance with the scriptures and that he appeared to Cephas, then to the twelve. Then he appeared to more than five hundred brothers and sisters at one time, most of whom are still alive, though some have died. Then he appeared to James, then to all the apostles.

— 1 Corinthians 15:3–7, NRSVue

Paul introduces verses 3 to 5 with the verbs παρέδωκα (paredōka, "I handed on") and παρέλαβον (parelabon, "I received"), the technical language for transmitting fixed tradition; Barrett describes Paul here as "a link in the chain" rather than the originator, and Collins notes that his command of the terminology reflects rabbinic training. Larry Hurtado calls the formula "sacred tradition". Several features mark the passage as a formula Paul quotes rather than composes: four clauses each introduced by ὅτι (hoti, "that"), which Thiselton notes function in the manner of quotation marks; a stylized parallelism; the perfect passive ἐγήγερται (egēgertai, "he has been raised") against the surrounding aorists; and vocabulary Paul does not otherwise use, including "according to the Scriptures" and "the Twelve", the latter appearing here alone in his letters. Oscar Cullmann and J. N. D. Kelly describe the resulting unit as an early confession shaped for catechesis or preaching, and Fitzmyer calls it "the oldest record of the Christian belief in the resurrection of Jesus", older than the Gospel accounts.

On "died for our sins according to the Scriptures" (verse 3), commentators generally see a reference to the Suffering Servant of Isaiah 53, but caution against pressing it: Barrett judges that "the general allusion was made before specific passages were alleged", Collins calls the phrase "an interpretive formula, a hermeneutical key" rather than a proof-text, and Fitzmyer notes that pre-Christian Judaism did not read the Servant song of an expiatory death. Fee argues that since Second Temple Judaism did not read Isaiah's Servant song as referring to a personal Messiah, whoever first joined Jesus's death to "our sins" in those terms took a decisive step in earliest Christian belief, and that the evidence points to Jesus himself, at the Last Supper.

==== Date and origin ====
Whether the formula was first composed in Aramaic or in Greek in the Jerusalem apostolic community setting, or took shape in a Greek-speaking church or in Damascus is debated, although consensus is that it is very early. (Note: Ancient creed: Wolfhart Pannenberg, Jesus – God and Man translated Lewis Wilkins and Duane Pribe (Philadelphia: Westminster, 1968) p. 90; Oscar Cullmann, The Early church: Studies in Early Christian History and Theology, ed. A. J. B. Higgins (Philadelphia: Westminster, 1966) p. 66; R. E. Brown, The Virginal Conception and Bodily Resurrection of Jesus (New York: Paulist Press, 1973) p. 81; Thomas Sheehan, First Coming: How the Kingdom of God Became Christianity (New York: Random House, 1986) pp. 110, 118; Donald Hagner, The New Testament: A Historical and Theological Introduction (Baker Books: 2012) Part 2.7. The Origin and Reliability of the Gospel Tradition; Ulrich Wilckens, Resurrection translated A. M. Stewart (Edinburgh: Saint Andrew, 1977) p. 2) Collins reports that most scholars follow Joachim Jeremias, who argued from Semitisms such as the Aramaic name "Cephas" and the parallel structure for a Palestinian original; Conzelmann records the same discussion while noting that Jeremias offered "signs" rather than strict proofs. Fitzmyer objects that "there is no known Semitic equivalent" of the phrase "according to the Scriptures", so a formula with Palestinian roots could still have reached its final shape in a Hellenistic Jewish community. How much of verses 3 to 8 belonged to the original unit is likewise disputed: many commentators limit it to verses 3b to 5, and Fitzmyer, following Jerome Murphy-O'Connor, treats the reference to the five hundred in verse 6 as Paul's own addition.

Paul's own conversion and his stay with Cephas and James at Jerusalem (Galatians 1:18–19) are generally taken as the occasions on which he could have received the tradition, which places its formulation within a few years of the crucifixion. Published estimates fall within a narrow range. Wright likewise places the formulation "within the first two or three years after Easter", and describes the tradition as "firm, universal and early", to which Paul could appeal in the mid-50s "as something which all early Christians knew well" and distinguishes its content, which Paul says he received by revelation (Galatians 1:11–12), from its wording, which was handed on to him. Hays dates the formula to within about three years of the crucifixion; James Dunn holds that it was "formulated as tradition within months of Jesus' death"; the Jesus Seminar, convened by Robert W. Funk, allows "two or three years at most"; Helmut Koester holds that the traditions in Paul's letters "can be dated to the time before Paul's calling, that is, no later than within five years after Jesus' death"; Bart Ehrman questions how precise such figures can be. While accepting that Paul inherited the formula, he argues that calling a passage "pre-Pauline" does not establish that it was composed or circulating before Paul's conversion, and asks what would show that the appearance to the Twelve stood in a creed by AD 36. Geza Vermes states that the words of Paul are "a tradition he has inherited from his seniors in the faith concerning the death, burial and resurrection of Jesus". Gerd Lüdemann, who rejects a bodily resurrection, nonetheless places the formula "within the first two years after the crucifixion of Jesus"; and the classicist Michael Grant calls it "very early". Michael Goulder, who explained the resurrection appearances as visionary rather than bodily, likewise held that Paul "received" the tradition "at his conversion", "perhaps two years after Jesus' death". Willi Marxsen dissents, arguing that the formula "is by no means an ancient formula, but a relatively late one".

The early date is nonetheless accepted across a wide range of positions, including by scholars who reject a bodily resurrection: Lüdemann, who explains the appearances as visionary experiences, describes the recovery of pre-Pauline confessional formulations as "I do insist, however, that the discovery of pre-Pauline confessional formulations is one of the great achievements of recent New Testament scholarship". For this reason the passage occupies a central place in historical study of the resurrection of Jesus, where it is treated as the earliest surviving evidence for what the first Christians claimed; Thiselton, citing Wolfhart Pannenberg, adds that the reference to the burial implies the empty tomb and makes a claim open to historical testing. The competing historical explanations of the appearances themselves are treated at Resurrection of Jesus.

James P. Ware notes that the original Greek word ἐγείρω, translated as "raised", always refers to the reanimation of the corpse when used with reference to the dead. He states that "[i]t is thus beyond doubt that the apostolic formula of 1 Cor 15 affirms that Jesus arose on the third day in his crucified body, leaving behind an empty tomb." E. Frank Tupper says the tradition of the appearances of the resurrected Christ and the tradition of the empty tomb "remain separate in the oldest strata of tradition, 1 Corinthians 15 and Mark 16 respectively", using this to argue for the "facticity" of the appearances via the historiographic work of Wolfhart Pannenberg.

==== The appearances (verses 5–8) ====
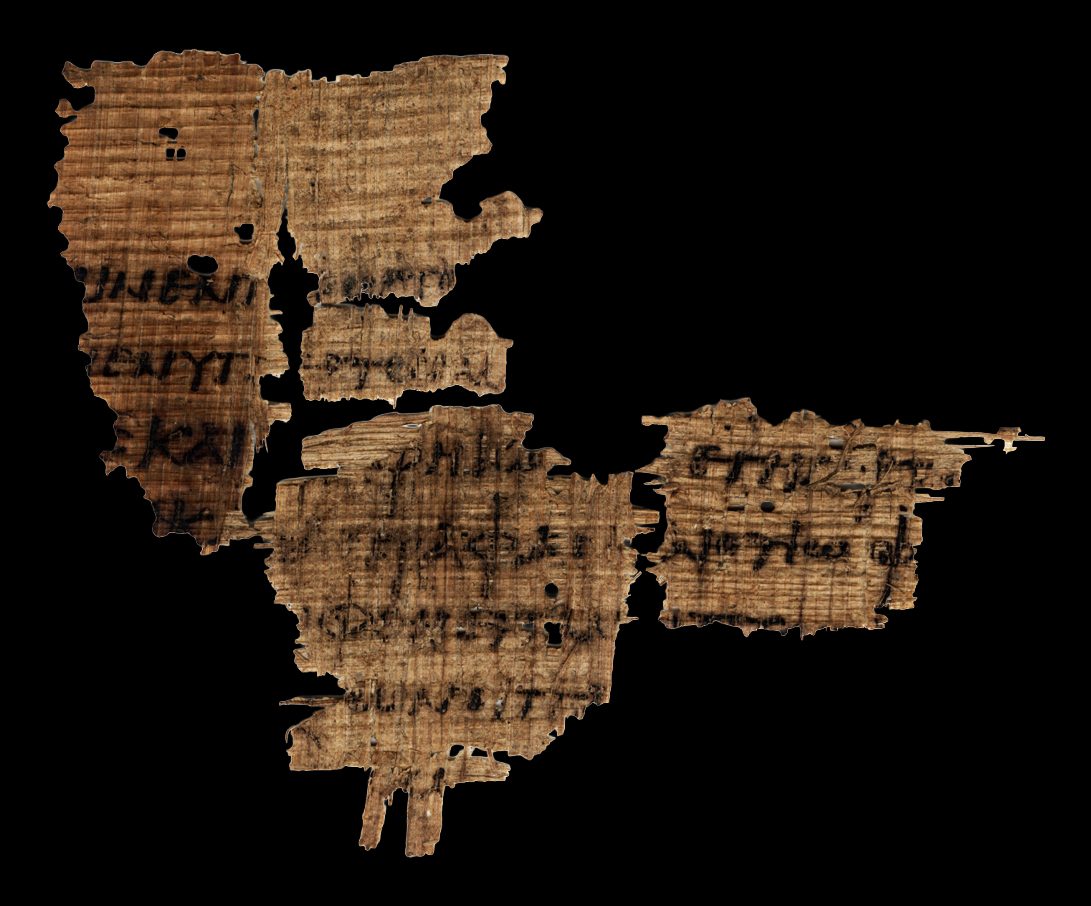
Papyrus 123, a 4th-century fragment from Egypt, contains part of 1 Cor 15:3–6: "…to you as of first importance what I in turn had received: that Christ died for our sins in accordance with the scriptures, and that he was buried, and that he was raised on the third day in accordance with the scriptures, and that he appeared to Cephas, then to the twelve. Then he appeared to more than five hundred brothers and sisters at one time, most of whom are still alive, though some have died." (NRSV)

The formula lists appearances to Cephas, to "the Twelve", to more than five hundred at once, to James, to "all the apostles", and finally to Paul, who calls himself "one untimely born", ἔκτρωμα (ektrōma, "miscarriage"). The verb ὤφθη (ōphthē, "he appeared"), drawn from the Septuagint language of theophany, is taken by Collins and Fitzmyer to point to an appearance understood as objective rather than as an inward vision. Wright, surveying the term's occurrences in the Septuagint, cautions that it is ambiguous between "was seen by" and "appeared to" and that no account of what the appearances were can rest on the word alone. Collins observes that Paul alludes to the appearances to women only through the inclusive word "brothers and sisters", since under the prevailing understanding of the law women could not serve as witnesses; Wright, citing Richard Bauckham, gives the same explanation for their omission from a formal statement of testimony.

The appearance to more than five hundred has no parallel in the Gospels, and Barrett judges that attempts to identify it with Pentecost are "beyond proof". Paul's note that most of them "are still alive" is read by Fitzmyer, with Murphy-O'Connor, as underlining that the claim could be checked, and C. H. Dodd reads it to the same effect, that the remark implies "the witnesses are there to be questioned". Craig also cites Hans Grass on the appearance to James, who according to the Gospels had not believed during Jesus's lifetime (Mark 3:21). Others read the list differently: the Jesus Seminar treats the appearance to the five hundred as a visionary experience of the kind reported at Pentecost, and Conzelmann notes older source theories, going back to Adolf von Harnack, that verses 5 to 7 combine two rival lists associated with Cephas and with James. Urich Wilckens proposes that it is possible that Paul himself joined the various statements himself, although this is found "less likely" by scholars "since Paul uses the quasi-technical vocabulary of ‘receiving’ and ‘passing on’ a tradition".

Raymond E. Brown acknowledges that some argue that is also possible that "he appeared" was not specified in the core formula, and that the specific appearances are additions, but finds the resulting mid-sentence ending, "he appeared", unlikely

=== The subjection of the Son (verses 24–28) ===
Fitzmyer notes that the verses are "as close as Paul ever comes" to relating the Son to the Father and that they "played a role in the later theological problem of Subordinationism". The passage states that at the end Christ will hand over the kingdom to God the Father, having destroyed every rule and power, and that the Son himself will then be "subjected" to God, "that God may be all in all" (verses 24 to 28). Barrett notes "a strong vein of subordinationism in this passage", and Thiselton cites Richard B. Hays who says "it is impossible to avoid the impression that Paul is operating with what would later come to be called a subordinationist christology". Most commentators read the language as functional rather than ontological: Barrett, following Bachmann, takes "God all in all" "soteriologically, not metaphysically", as the unchallenged reign of God, and Collins and Fitzmyer read the subjection as expressing the Son's completed work.

In the fourth century, Arians appealed to the subjection of the Son as evidence that he was subordinate to the Father and that his kingdom would end; Gregory of Nyssa wrote a treatise on verse 28, arguing that the subjection is accomplished through Christ's body, the church, and implies nothing about the Son's nature, and Chrysostom read the "subjection" as the Son's free concord with the Father rather than subjugation. Origen also used the verse for his teaching that God would finally be "all in all" through the restoration of every rational being (apokatastasis), a reading Gregory of Nyssa developed and Augustine rejected.

=== The resurrection body (verses 35–49) ===
Irenaeus called this "the passage cited by all the heretics" who denied bodily resurrection, and it has become a focal point in debates on the topic. "

Paul compares the resurrection body with a seed, which is put into the ground and given a new body by God (verses 36 to 38). Thiselton observes that for Paul the only link between the "bare grain" and the body of glory is the creative power of God. Wright likewise denies that Paul pictures the new body growing out of the corpse. He describes the analogy as asserting discontinuity within continuity, since seed and plant are not identical, He also argues that δόξα (doxa, "glory") in verses 40 to 43 means honour or proper dignity rather than luminosity, the contrast in verse 43 being with ἀτιμία (atimia, "dishonour"). The heart of the discussion is the contrast in verse 44 between the σῶμα ψυχικόν (sōma psychikon, "natural body"), animated by the ψυχή (psychē, "soul"), and the σῶμα πνευματικόν (sōma pneumatikon, "spiritual body"). Barrett, Thiselton, Fee and Conzelmann agree that "spiritual" here does not mean made of spirit or non-physical, but a body animated and directed by the Holy Spirit. Thiselton notes that the Greek ending denotes mode or character, not the material a thing is made of, so that the raised body is "more than physical but not less". Wright argues that Greek adjectives formed with the ending -ικος (-ikos, "characterized by") carry a functional rather than a material sense, so that the pair describes "not what something is composed of, but what it is animated by", a distinction he likens to that between a ship made of steel or wood and a ship driven by steam or wind; on this reading the spiritual body is one animated by the Spirit of God, and the natural body an ordinary body animated by the breath of life. Wright accordingly criticises the renderings "physical body" and "spiritual body" in the Revised Standard Version and New Revised Standard Version as importing a Platonic noting that ψυχικός (psychikos, "natural") would have been an odd word for "physical"raised it embodies the spirit", which Hays also prefers. Fitzmyer treats the phrase as a deliberate oxymoron, since πνεῦμα (pneuma, "spirit") normally means everything that σῶμα (sōma, "body") is not.

Paul bases his argument on Genesis 2:7, where Adam "became a living being", set against Christ, "the last Adam", who "became a life-giving spirit" (verse 45). Fitzmyer and Barrett note that the second phrase is Paul's own phrasing rather than a quotation, that his contrast of the two Adams is representative and eschatological, and that Paul draws it from his interpretation of Genesis rather than from the two-men speculation of Philo, whose order (the heavenly man first) is reversed by Paul at verse 46. Wright renders ὁ ἔσχατος Ἀδάμ (ho eschatos Adam, "the last Adam") as "the final Adam", arguing that Christ is presented as the goal rather than merely the latest in a series, and asserts that "heavenly" in verses 47 to 49 denotes the origin of the new humanity rather than its destination, so that the passage points toward a renewed creation and not an escape from embodiment. At verse 49 the manuscripts vary between "let us bear" (a call to conduct) and "we shall bear" the image of the heavenly man. Collins prefers "let us bear" on the external evidence and on Paul's habit of ending an argument with exhortation. The statement that "flesh and blood cannot inherit the kingdom of God" (verse 50) is read as mortality (human nature) or as physicality (whether the resurrection is physical or merely spiritual): Barrett and Thiselton follow Joachim Jeremias in interpreting "flesh and blood" literally as living human nature in its frailty and the parallel term as the dead, so that neither the living nor the dead can enter the kingdom without transformation. Collins and Fitzmyer reject that reading and treat the two phrases as synonyms for mortal humanity. Wright, noting that the clause has been used since the second century to question whether Paul expected a bodily resurrection at all, translates "flesh and blood" as "the present physical humanity, which is subject to decay and death" rather than physicality as such, and takes its referent to be the living, who need not to be raised but to be changed.

The materiality (although not the idea) of the risen body was contested among the Church Fathers. Tertullian said that the same flesh rises, transformed; Origen argued against those who denied any bodily resurrection, but also against fellow Christians who expected the identical present body, holding that the flesh is radically changed like seed into plant. Chrysostom took a middle position, that "it is not one substance that is sown, and another that is raised, but the same substance improved". 1 Corinthians 15:50 ("flesh and blood cannot inherit the kingdom of God, nor does the perishable inherit the imperishable"). Iraneaus said, as did Tertullian and Chrysostom, that "flesh and blood" meant a sinful way of life rather than the substance of the body.

=== Conclusion (verse 58) ===
Paul closes the chapter by exhorting the Corinthians to be "steadfast, immovable, always abounding in the work of the Lord", because "your labour is not in vain in the Lord". Fee notes that the closing "not in vain" is an echo of the chapter's opening concern that the Corinthians may have "believed in vain" (verse 2), being a refrain in verses 10, 14 and 17, so that the exhortation ties the whole argument together. Witherington classifies the verse as the chapter's peroratio in the terms of classical rhetoric; combining a summary of the preceding argument with an emotional appeal to steadfastness. He identifies "in vain" as a recognised topos (technique) of ancient deliberative oratory, citing Aristotle's Rhetoric and Quintilian's Institutio Oratoria.

== Reception and cultural influence ==
=== History of interpretation ===
The chapter was central to early Christian debates over the afterlife and over Christology. Kovacs notes that what it says about the resurrection body was invoked by parties on different sides of the debate, both against those denying bodily resurrection, and against those who identified the risen body too closely with the present one. The subjection of the Son verse 28 became a battleground of the Arian controversy. Chrysostom preached five homilies on the chapter, several of which for consolation of the bereaved.

=== Literature ===
In J. K. Rowling's Harry Potter and the Deathly Hallows (2007) the headstone of Harry's parents at Godric's Hollow is inscribed "The last enemy that shall be destroyed is death", the words of verse 26 in the King James Version. Rowling said of this quotation and of the one on a second grave that "they almost epitomize the whole series", and that she had avoided naming the religious source earlier because it would have revealed too much of the ending.

Shakespeare via MacDuff describes Lady Macbeth in Macbeth, Act IV, Scene iii as "Oftener upon her knees than on her feet / Died every day she lived.", an allusion to verse 31. He also quotes verse 52 ("in the twinkling of an eye") in The Merchant of Venice Act II, Scene ii.

=== Music ===
The third part of Handel's oratorio Messiah (1741), with text compiled by Charles Jennens, as verses 20 – 22 as its central sequence ("Since by man came death") and verses 51 – 57, among them "Behold, I tell you a mystery" (verses 51 to 52), "The trumpet shall sound" (verses 52 to 53) and "O death, where is thy sting?" (verses 55 to 56). The sixth movement of Brahms's Ein deutsches Requiem (1868) sets verses 51, 52, 54 and 55 in Luther's German, rising to a fugue on the triumph over death.

=== Liturgical use ===
Passages from the chapter are popular for Christian funerals. In the Book of Common Prayer, the "Burial of the Dead" cites verses from 1 Corinthians 15 as an epistle reading, headed "Raised in incorruption" (Rite One) and "The imperishable body" (Rite Two). In the Eastern Orthodox funeral service the appointed epistle is 1 Thessalonians 4:13–17, but 1 Corinthians 15:20–28 and 1 Corinthians 15:47–57 are provided as alternative readings. The Roman Catholic Order of Christian Funerals includes 1 Corinthians 15:51–57 among its New Testament readings. The Catechism of the Catholic Church cites the chapter in its articles on the resurrection of the dead as does the Reformed Heidelberg Catechism, where the answer regarding "the resurrection of the body" cites 1 Corinthians 15:20, 1 Corinthians 15:42–46 and 1 Corinthians 15:54, and the Westminster Shorter Catechism, which cites 1 Corinthians 15:42–43 on the resurrection body believers receive at Christ's return. Chrysostom already connected the chapter with the liturgical commemoration of the dead and with the baptismal profession of belief in "the resurrection of the dead".

== See also ==
- Resurrection of the dead
- Resurrection of Jesus
- Last Adam
- Baptism for the dead
- Glorified body
- Kerygma
