= Duke of Edinburgh (disambiguation) =

Duke of Edinburgh is a title in the British peerage.

Duke of Edinburgh may also refer to:

== Title holders ==
- Alfred, Duke of Saxe-Coburg and Gotha, who held the title from 1866 to 1900
- Charles III, who held the title from 2021 to 2022
- Frederick, Prince of Wales, who held the title from 1726 to 1751
- George III, who held the title from 1751 to 1760
- Prince Edward, Duke of Edinburgh, holder of the title since 2023
- Prince Philip, Duke of Edinburgh, who held the title from 1947 to 2021
- Prince William Frederick, Duke of Gloucester and Edinburgh, who held a strictly distinct Gloucester and Edinburgh title from 1805 to 1834
- Prince William Henry, Duke of Gloucester and Edinburgh, who held a strictly distinct Gloucester and Edinburgh title from 1764 to 1805

== Other uses ==
- 7th Duke of Edinburgh's Own Gurkha Rifles, a military unit named after Prince Philip
- 99th Duke of Edinburgh's (Lanarkshire) Regiment of Foot, a military unit named after Alfred
- Duke of Edinburgh Dry Dock, part of Swansea Docks and named for Alfred
- Duke of Edinburgh Stakes, a flat Handicap horse race named in 1999 after Prince Philip
- Duke of Edinburgh-class cruiser, a class of British armoured cruisers named after Alfred
  - HMS Duke of Edinburgh, lead ship of the class
- Duke of Edinburgh's (Wiltshire Regiment), a military unit named after Alfred
- Duke of Edinburgh's Own Edinburgh Artillery, a military unit named after Alfred
- Duke of Edinburgh's Royal Regiment, a military unit named after Prince Philip
- Gerzog Edinburgski, a Russian ship named after Alfred
- The Duke of Edinburgh Hotel, a hotel in Barrow-in-Furness, named for Alfred
- The Duke of Edinburgh, Brixton, a public house in London, named for Alfred
- The Duke of Edinburgh's Award, a youth awards programme founded by Prince Philip
- The Duke of Edinburgh's International Award - Canada, the Canadian version of the youth awards programme

== See also ==
- Duke of Gloucester and Edinburgh
