= Defying Ocean's End =

Global agenda for action in marine conservation

Defying Ocean's End (DOE) is a global agenda for action in marine conservation compiled in a 2004 Island Press book. It is also the title of a 2003 Los Cabos (Mexico) conference, where the agenda was formulated.

The DOE website describes itself as "a practical agenda of action to safeguard the ocean for future generations to come. This dynamic strategy-including costs and recommendations-is a collective voice for those seeking to reverse the disturbing trends we are witnessing in the ocean today. As never again, we have an opportunity now to respond to this crisis, by moving beyond localized and ad hoc initiatives - however good they might be - to coordinated global action."

The website also lists a "DOE Office" charged with distributing the agenda. The office is composed of Dr. Sylvia Earle, Arlo Hemphill, Tim Noviello and Linda K. Glover:.

== Defying Ocean's End book ==
Published in 2004 by Island Press, Defying Ocean's End is now used as a university textbook for marine conservation. The book is a collaboration of over 70 authors and was edited by Linda K. Glover and Dr. Sylvia Earle, along with assistant editor Arlo Hemphill and maps created by Debra Fischman. The book also includes a foreword by Great Barrier Reef Marine Park Authority founding director Graeme Kelleher.

Photographers for the book include Paul Arena, Haroldo Castro, David Doubilet, Sylvia Earle, Peter Etnoyer, Greg Foster, Neil Hammerschlag, Arlo Hemphill, Wolcott Henry, Jennifer Jeffers, Lance Jordan, Roderic Mast, Cristina Mittermeier, Russell Mittermeier, NASA, NOAA Office of Exploration, Roger Steene, Patricio Robles Gil, Timothy Werner and Sterling Zumbrunn.

A photograph of Pearl Jam rhythm guitarist Stone Gossard is included in the book, along with a note of appreciation.

Chapters of the book are:

1. The Caribbean
2. Seamount Biodiversity, Exploitation and Conservation
3. The Southern Ocean: A Model System for Conserving Resources?
4. Coral Triangle
5. The Gulf of California: Natural Resource Concerns and the Pursuit of a Vision
6. Lines on the Water: Ocean-Use Planning in Large Marine Ecosystem
7. Rationality or Chaos? Global Fisheries at the Crossroads
8. A Global Network for Sustained Governance of Coastal Ecosystems
9. Restoring and Maintaining Marine Ecosystem Function
10. Defying Ocean's End through the Power of Communications
11. Ocean Governance: A New Ethos through a World Ocean Public Trust
12. The Unknown Ocean
13. Business Plan
14. Technology Support to Conservation

== Los Cabos conference ==
Defying Ocean's End was launched at a conference held in Los Cabos, Mexico on May 29 to June 3, 2003. The conference was organized by Conservation International; convened by American oceanographer, Dr. Sylvia Earle, and Intel Corporation co-founder, Gordon Moore; and chaired by Graeme Kelleher. It included the participation of nearly 150 experts from more than 20 countries, representing the fields of ocean science, finance, and conservation. A select group of senior representatives from world governments, corporations and the media were also in attendance. In addition to Conservation International, a number of large, international conservation organizations collaborated on the conference. These included The Nature Conservancy, Natural Resources Defense Council, The Ocean Conservancy, Wildlife Conservation Society, the International Union for Conservation of Nature and the World Wildlife Fund. The Conference was sponsored by the Gordon and Betty Moore Foundation, BP, ESRI, Royal Caribbean International and the Alexander Henry Foundation.

The conference was structured into 5 regional case studies, 7 thematic working groups, and a business team focused on developing Action Plans which addressed specific issues and outcomes - with priorities, and costs identified—for 1-year, 3-year, and 10-year timeframes. Five case studies were presented to all Conference participants, which addressed lessons learned and recommendations in very different regions: The Caribbean, Seamounts, Antarctic Waters, The Coral Triangle and the Gulf of California.

Break-out discussions were divided into seven Thematic Working Groups on widely ranging science, conservation, social, economic and legal topics:

- Ocean-Use Planning and Marine Protected Areas
- Economic Incentives and Disincentives
- Land-Ocean Interface
- Maintaining/Restoring Functional Marine Ecosystems
- Communication
- Ocean Governance
- The Unknown Ocean

A Business Team led by Larry Linden of Goldman Sachs worked with all groups to identify key cost drivers and estimate reasonable total solution costs.

=== Results ===
The DOE website lists the following "high level" results:

- Global Governance: Treat the 60% of the world ocean outside of national Exclusive Economic Zones as a World Ocean Public Trust. Establish legal and implementation approaches concerning ocean uses in the high seas - including fisheries - under coordinated, international multi-use zoning regimes.
- Fisheries Reform: Use market-based mechanisms and changes to subsidies to reform fisheries through development of sustainable fishing projects, and the establishment of a global fund to provide incentives for the adoption of sustainable practices.
- Communications: Implement global and regional communications plans; focus on educating the general public worldwide to ocean problems. Initiate global all-media campaigns on major issues. In developing nations, tailor the message to local cultural concerns, understanding and information networks (e.g., tribal elders), and build local capacity for disseminating the message.
- Marine Protected Areas/Large Marine Ecosystems: Create, consolidate, and strengthen marine protected areas (MPAs) into a globally representative network. Develop/implement coordinated, global large marine ecosystem (LME) programs in identified priority regions. Provide more robust multi-use zoning and enforcement mechanisms to protect these LMEs. Establish LME/MPA protections over 5% of the world ocean within the next 10 years (0.7% currently).
- Global Science: Develop an expanded applied research program focused on top priority marine environments high in endemism and biodiversity - seamounts, shallow- and deep-water reefs, continental slopes, caves and blue holes.

=== Participants ===
Notable attendees of the Defying Ocean's End conference included Chris Anderson, Dr. Farooq Azam, Jean-Michel Cousteau, Dr. Sylvia Earle, Cristina Mittermeier, Dr. Russell Mittermeier, Gordon Moore, Dr. Ransom A. Myers, Dr. Callum Roberts and David Sandalow.

Additional participating organizations included:

- Agrupacion Sierra Madre, Unidos Para la Conservacion
- American University
- Boston University
- British Antarctic Survey
- Cabot-Wellington LLC
- California Academy of Sciences
- Charles Darwin Research Station
- Chinese Academy of Fishery Sciences
- CORDIO
- CSIRO Marine and Atmospheric Research
- Dalhousie University
- David and Lucile Packard Foundation
- Duke University
- Environmental Defense Fund
- Environmental Solutions International
- Florida Institute of Oceanography
- Foundation Patagonia Natural
- GE Capital Mexico
- George Mason University
- GloverWorks Consulting
- Goldman Sachs
- Green Team Advertising, Inc.
- Government of Baja California Sur
- Hauslein & Company, Inc.
- IFREMER
- Instituto Nacional de Ecologia (Mexico)
- Inter-American Tropical Tuna Commission
- International Community Foundation
- International Institute for Environmental Communication
- International Seakeepers Society
- IUCN Species Survival Commission
- Marine Conservation Biology Institute
- Massachusetts Institute of Technology
- Meridian Strategy Group, LLC
- Ministry of Marine Affairs and Fisheries, Indonesia
- National Geographic Society
- National Oceanic and Atmospheric Administration
- New England Aquarium
- Ocean Futures Society
- Richard B. Gump South Pacific Research Station
- Rowan Companies
- Rutgers University
- The Sapling Foundation
- Scripps Institution of Oceanography
- SeaWeb
- Sinar Harian Daily
- Texas A&M University
- Universidade Federal da Bahia
- University of California, Davis
- University of Cape Town
- University of Iceland
- University of Maryland
- University of Miami
- University of Minnesota
- University of North Carolina
- University of Otago
- University of the Philippines
- University of Rhode Island
- University of Washington
- University of York
- WildAid
- Woods Hole Oceanographic Institution
- World Conservation Monitoring Centre
- World Resources Institute
