= Doo Aphane =

Swazi lawyer and women's rights campaigner

- Occupation: Lawyer
- Known for: Women's rights campaigns

Doo Aphane is a Swazi lawyer and women's rights campaigner. She has worked with many human and women's rights organisations. In 2012 she was successful in changing Swaziland's law to allow married women to hold property in their own name.

== Career ==
Doo Aphane has a master of law degree and practises as a lawyer, specialising in gender law. She founded the Women for Women Development Consultancy, she remains a director of the firm, and also founded the legal aid clinic of the Council of Swaziland Churches. Aphane conducts legal research and is the co-author of several academic papers. She was the first national coordinator of women and law for Swaziland for the Human Rights Trust of Southern Africa and was also the regional coordinator of six southern African countries for the Women’s Legal Rights Initiative. Aphane was deputy chair of the central coordinating body of the Global Fund for Women and was a member of the Southern African Development Community's technical advisory committee on HIV and AIDS from 2007–2012. She was also a board member of Swaziland Young Women’s Network, the AIDS Information and Support Centre and remains a member of the African Feminist Forum.

Aphane warned the Swaziland government that a prolonged teachers' strike in 2012 was affecting the education of children and their non-attendance at school exposed them to the risk of sexual assault and misuse of drugs. Also in 2012 she won a case at the Swaziland Supreme Court challenging the prohibition on married women owning property either in their own name or jointly with her husband; the law was subsequently amended.
