= Cephas Lumina =

Zambian lawyer and human rights expert

Cephas Lumina is a Zambian lawyer and human rights expert. From 2008 to 2014 he was the "United Nations Independent Expert on the effects of foreign debt and other related international financial obligations of States on the full enjoyment of all human rights, particularly economic, social and cultural rights", appointed by the United Nations Human Rights Council. He was succeeded by the Argentine lawyer Juan Pablo Bohovslavsky.

He holds an LLB with Merit (Zambia), an LLM in International Human Rights Law (Essex, United Kingdom), a PhD in International Human Rights Law (Griffith University, Australia), and an Advanced Diploma in International Human Rights (Åbo Akademi University, Finland).

He is an Advocate of the High Court for Zambia and an Extra-Ordinary Professor of Human Rights Law at the University of Pretoria, and has served as a visiting professor at the Raoul Wallenberg Institute of Human Rights and Humanitarian Law at Lund University in Sweden, a Visiting Lecturer at Makerere University in Uganda and as a consultant to the United Nations, the International Development Law Organization, the Canadian International Development Agency, the Swedish International Development Cooperation Agency, the Open Society Initiative for Southern Africa, the Human Rights Trust of Southern Africa, Women for Change and the High Court of Tanzania. He has written and lectured on human rights, humanitarian law, commercial law and legal education. He is also a member of the editorial boards of the International Human Rights Law Review and African Yearbook of International Humanitarian Law.
