= D/O =

D/O may refer to:

- Daughter of
- Delivery order
- Disorder (medicine)

== See also ==
- Do (disambiguation)
