= African Feminist Forum =

Biennial conference of African feminist activists

The African Feminist Forum (AFF) is a biennial conference that brings together African feminist activists to deliberate on issues of key concern to the feminist movement. It was developed out of growing concern amongst African feminists that efforts to advance the rights of African women were under serious threat. It took place for the first time in November 2006 in Accra, Ghana, and subsequently convened in Uganda (2008), Senegal (2010) and in Harare, Zimbabwe (2016).

== The African Feminist Forum Program ==
The African Feminist Forum program is organised along clusters which reflect the concerns and priorities of African feminists. Each cluster has two or three Coordinators. The clusters are as follows:

- Crafting an African Feminist Epistemology
- Feminist Perspectives on Sexual and Reproductive health and rights in Africa
- African Feminism: political and economic power; resisting fundamentalisms
- Intersecting-Generations
- Feminist Creative Expression
- African Women's Movements: organizations, structures and capacities
- Confronting violation in women's lives
- Global Feminism and the UN System

== Members ==
- Doo Aphane
- Jessica Horn
- Bisi Adeleye-Fayemi
- Everjoice Win
- Mary Wandia
