= Ruisrock =

Annual Finnish music festival

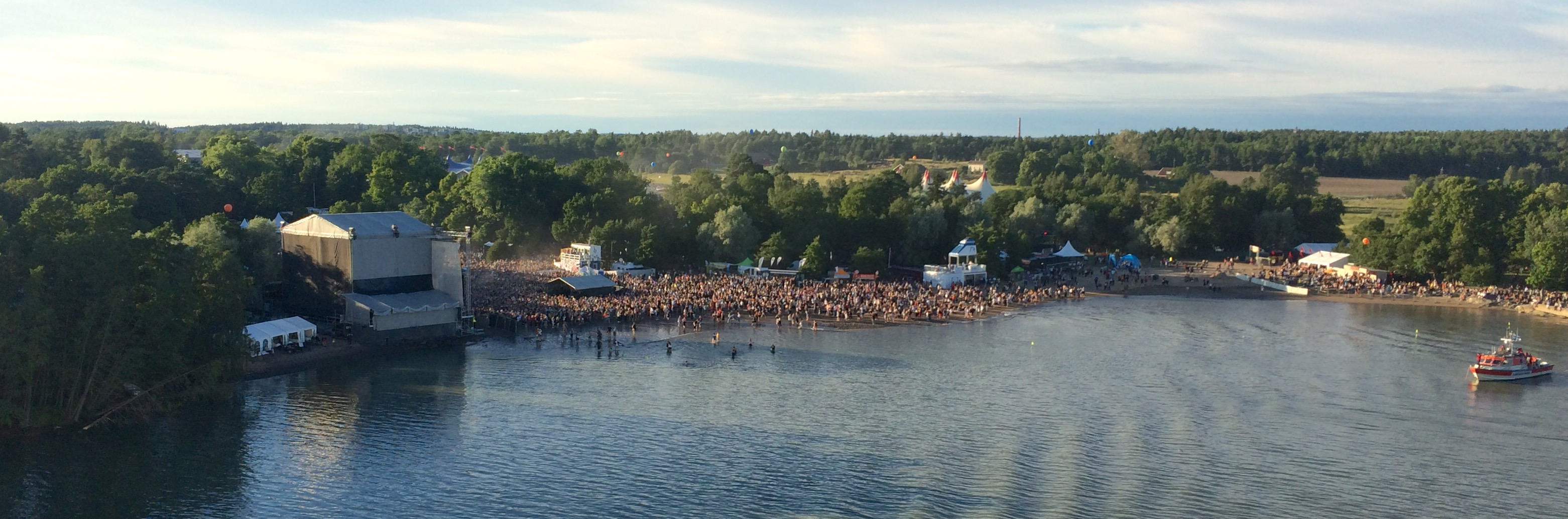
- Ranta-alue ("beach section") of Ruisrock in 2016.
- Genre: Rock music
- Locations: Ruissalo in Turku, Finland
- Coordinates: 60.4372°N 22.1918°E
- Years active: 1970-present
- Attendance: 105,000 (2017)
- Website: ruisrock.fi/en/

Ruisrock is a rock festival held annually on the island of Ruissalo in Turku, Finland. Ruisrock, founded in 1970, is the second-oldest rock festival in Europe (after Pinkpop) and the oldest in Finland. The festival has attracted international artists throughout its lifetime except around the start of the 2000s (decade), due to the organiser's economic issues.

== History ==
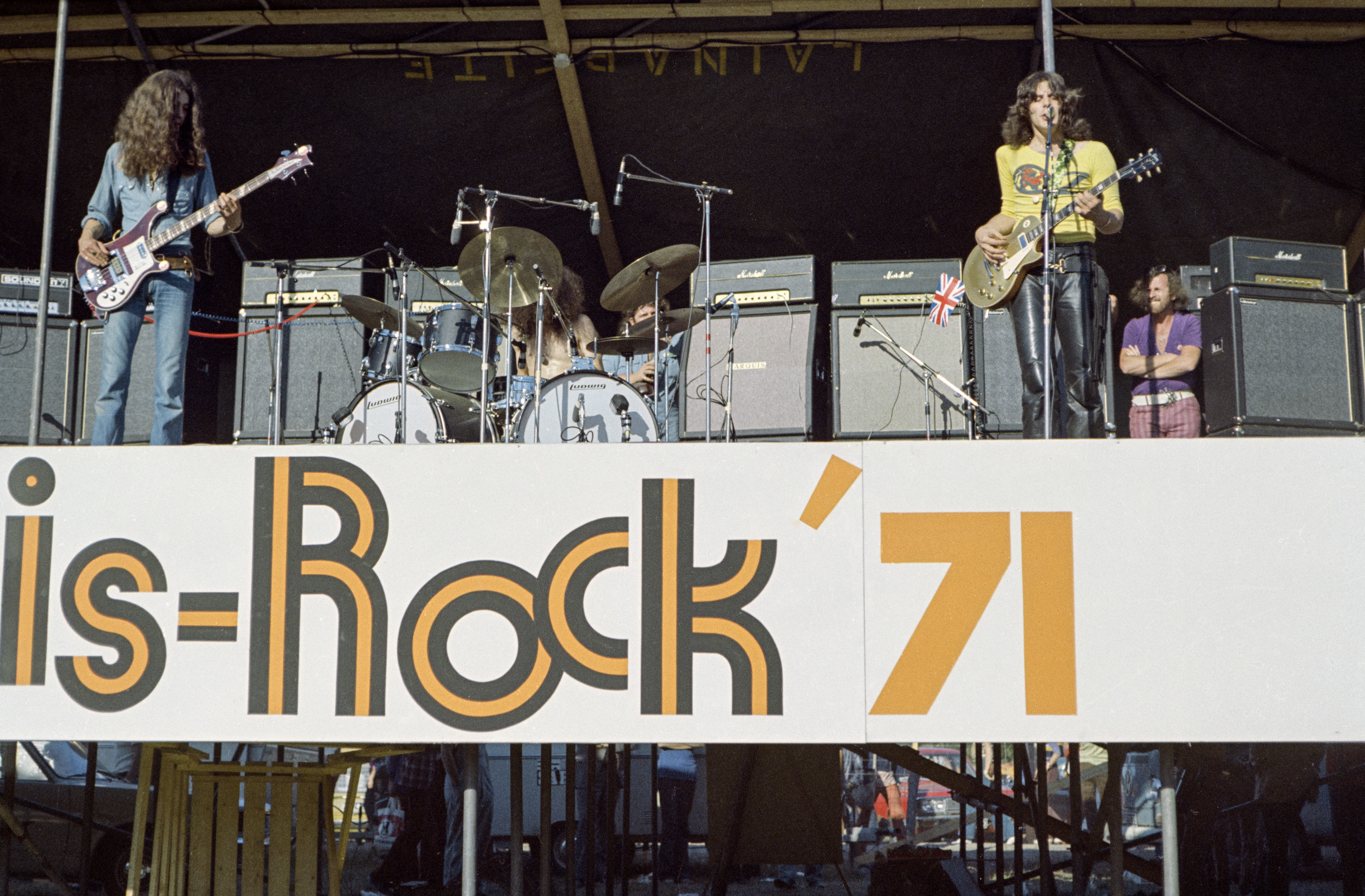
British rock band Pink Fairies in Ruisrock 1971

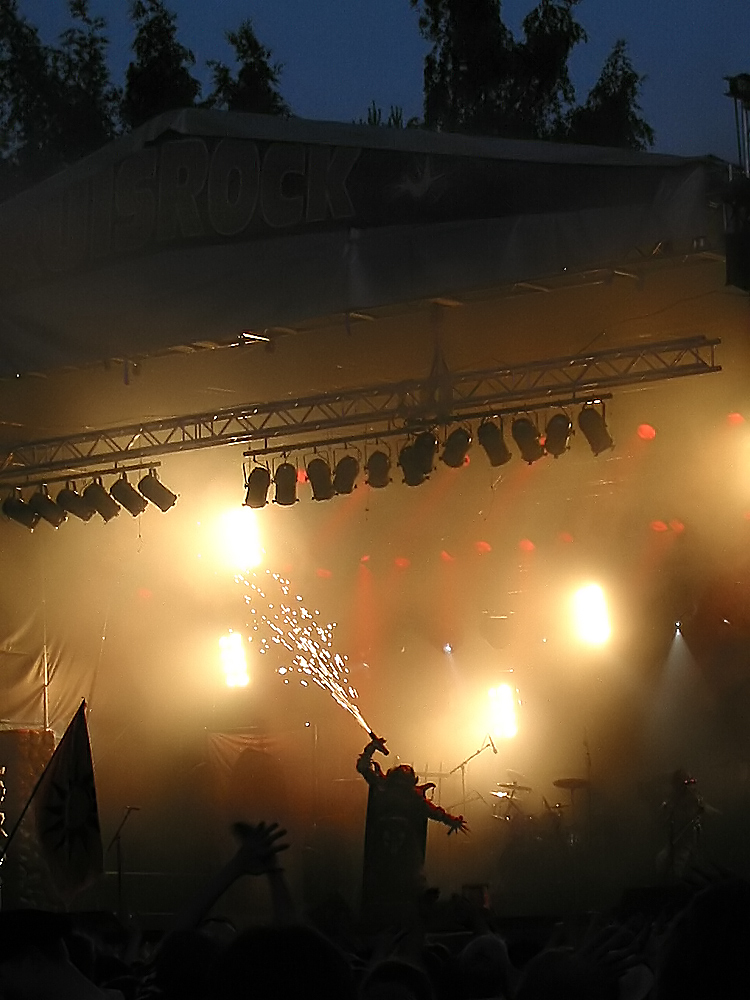
Lordi at Ruisrock festival in 2003

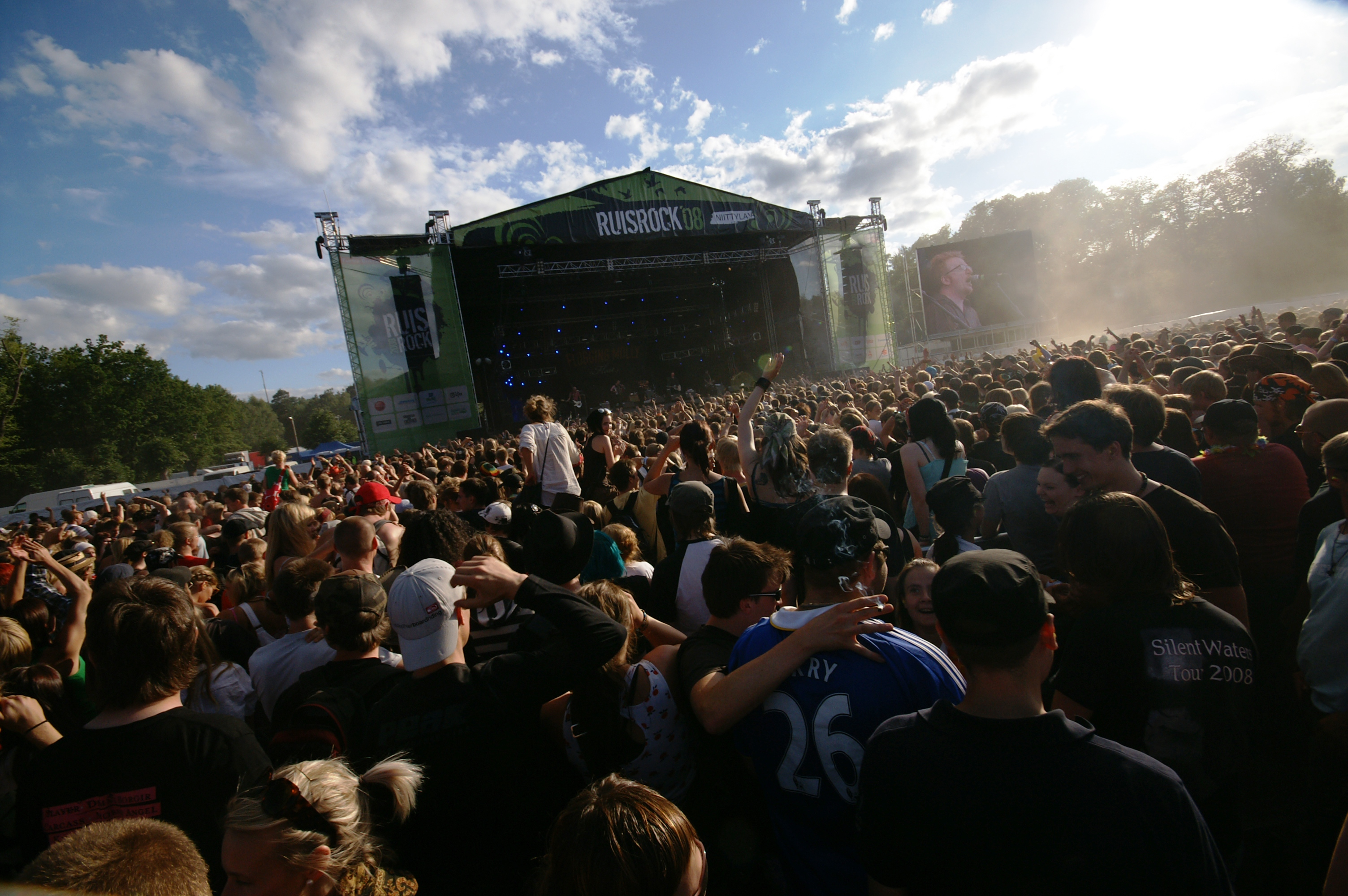
Flogging Molly performing at Ruisrock festival in 2008

The festival area is divided into two sections, Niittyalue ("meadow section") and Ranta-alue ("beach section").

In 2005, when the German industrial metal band Rammstein performed at the festival, 71,000 visitors attended the festival. In recent years, the number of visitors has fluctuated around 70,000. However, the all-time record was set in 1971, when there were about 100,000 visitors, with artists such as Canned Heat playing.

The 2009 edition of the festival saw a rise in attendance, when during 3 days there was a total of 92,000 visitors. In 2009, musical acts such as Slipknot, Disturbed, Faith No More, Mew, In Flames, Volbeat, Glasvegas, The Sounds, D'espairsRay, and popular domestic artists including Children of Bodom, HIM, Eppu Normaali, Tehosekoitin played at the festival, including the last live performance by The Crash.

In 2010, the festival was celebrating its 40-year anniversary, with popular artists such as Slash and Ozzy Osbourne playing.

In 2016, three reports of rape that occurred at the festival had surfaced and an additional two for sexual harassment. These claims are still under investigation by the Finnish police.

In 2017, 2018 and 2019, the festival gathered 105,000 people in the Ruissalo People's Park during the weekend, and all three days were sold out in each of the three years. The 2020 and 2021 Ruisrocki were canceled due to the coronavirus pandemic.

Other famous bands to have played Ruisrock include:

- Colosseum (1970)
- Family (1970)
- The Kinks (1971)
- Canned Heat (1971)
- Fairport Convention (1971)
- The Jeff Beck Group (1971)
- Pink Fairies (1971)
- Uriah Heep (1972 and 1978)
- MC5 (1972)
- Lindisfarne (1972)
- Status Quo (1973)
- Nazareth (1974)
- Procol Harum (1974)
- Mahavishnu Orchestra (1975)
- Rory Gallagher (1975)
- The Sensational Alex Harvey Band (1976)
- Chuck Berry (1976)
- Thin Lizzy (1977)
- The Boomtown Rats (1978)
- The Clash (1979)
- The Jam (1980)
- The Selecter (1980)
- UB40 (1981)
- Girlschool (1981)
- U2 (1982)
- Whitesnake (1983)
- The Alarm (1984)
- Nina Hagen (1984)
- The Cure (1985)
- The Damned (1986)
- The Pretenders (1987)
- The Stranglers (1988)
- Tanita Tikaram (1989)
- Georgia Satellites (1989)
- Soundgarden (1990)
- Bob Dylan (1990)
- Midnight Oil (1990)
- Billy Idol (1991)
- Nirvana (1992)
- Faith No More (1993)
- Chris Isaak (1993)
- Jethro Tull (1993)
- Aerosmith (1994)
- Simple Minds (1995)
- Bon Jovi (1995)
- Blur (1996)
- Pulp (1996)
- Neil Young (1996)
- David Bowie (1997)
- Sting (1997)
- Nick Cave and the Bad Seeds (1997)
- Pet Shop Boys (1997)
- Beastie Boys (1998)
- Jesus and Mary Chain (1998)
- Metallica (1999)
- Ministry (1999)
- Blondie (1999)
- Oasis (2000)
- Iron Maiden (2000)
- Lou Reed (2000)
- Nightwish (2000)
- Hellacopters (2001)
- Kent (2002)
- Manic Street Preachers (2003)
- Dio (2003)
- The Cardigans (2003)
- Motörhead (2004)
- Stray Cats (2004)
- Hawkwind (2004)
- Within Temptation (2005)
- Rammstein (2005)
- New York Dolls (2006)
- Morrissey (2006)
- Tool (2006)
- Flogging Molly (2006)
- Saxon (2006)
- Opeth (2006)
- Billy Talent (2007)
- Interpol (2008)
- Primal Scream (2008)
- Bullet for My Valentine (2008)
- Anti-Flag (2008)
- Slipknot (2009)
- Volbeat (2009)
- Canned Heat (2010)
- Ozzy Osbourne (2010)
- NOFX (2010)
- The Specials (2010)
- Amon Amarth (2010)
- The National (2011)
- Nekromantix (2011)
- Paramore (2011)
- Suicidal Tendencies (2012)
- Pulp (2012)
- Bloc Party (2012)
- Amorphis (2013)
- The Sounds (2013)
- Editors (2013)
- The Offspring (2014)
- Suede (2014)

== See also ==
- List of historic rock festivals
- List of music festivals
