= Dō =

Dō may refer to:

- Dō (architecture)
- Dō (armour)
- Dō (martial arts)
- Dō (philosophy)
