= Do Nothing till You Hear from Me (disambiguation) =

"Do Nothing till You Hear from Me" is a 1944 song with music by Duke Ellington and lyrics by Bob Russell.

Do Nothing till You Hear from Me or Do Nothing 'til You Hear from Me may also refer to:

- Do Nothing 'til You Hear from Me (album), a 1963 album by Johnny Griffin
- Do Nothing till You Hear from Me (album), a 2016 album by The Mute Gods

== See also ==
- Do Nothing (disambiguation)
