= 0D =

0D (zero D) or 0-D may refer to:

- Zero-dimensional space
- Darwin Airline (IATA code "OD")
- Zero-day attack
- 0x0D, the hex representation of newlines on some platforms
- 0DFx, an American punk band

== See also ==
- 0° (disambiguation)
- D0 (disambiguation)
- OD (disambiguation)
