= Ruissalo =

City district in Turku, Finland

Coordinates: 60°26′N 22°10′E

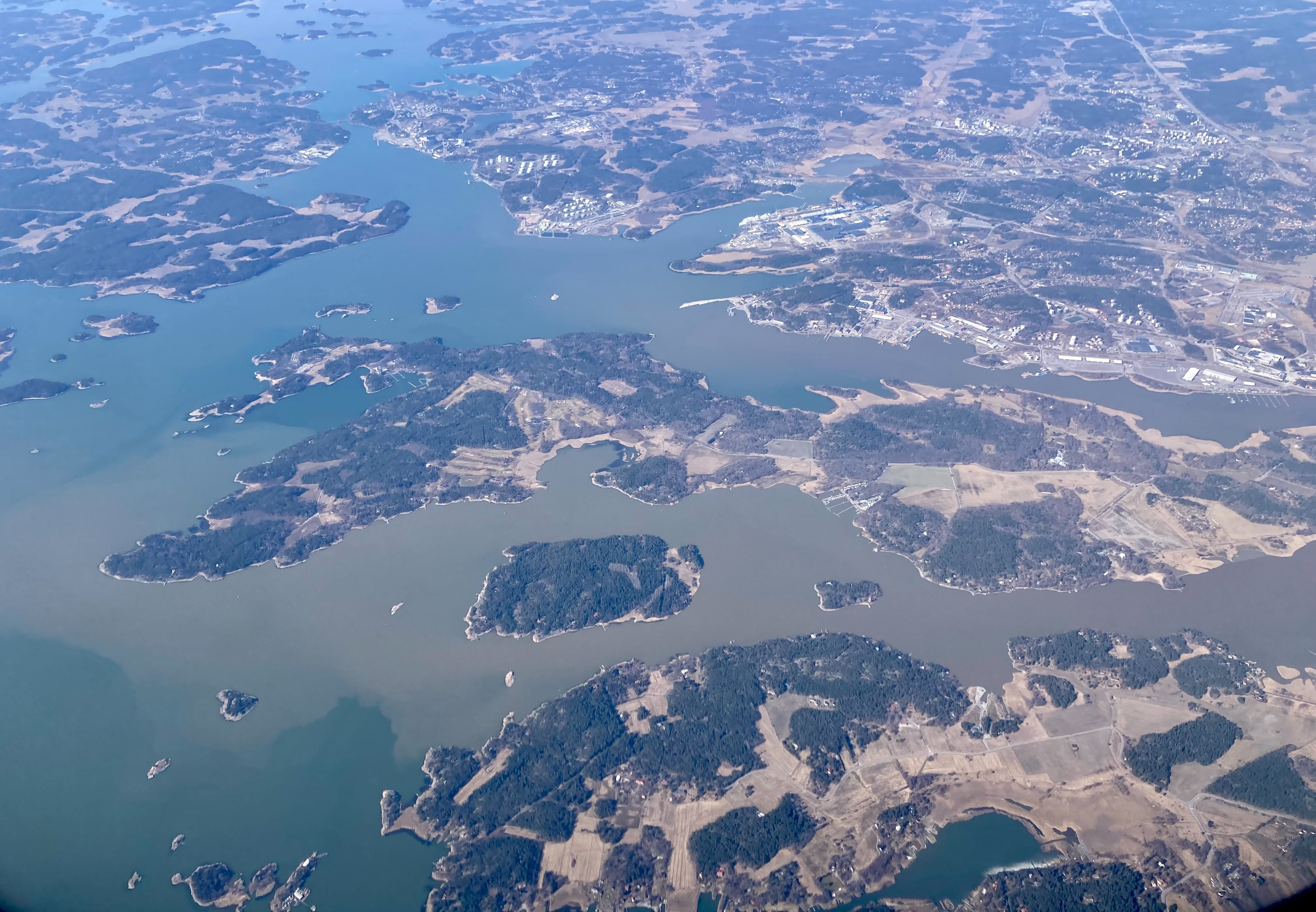
Aerial view of Ruissalo

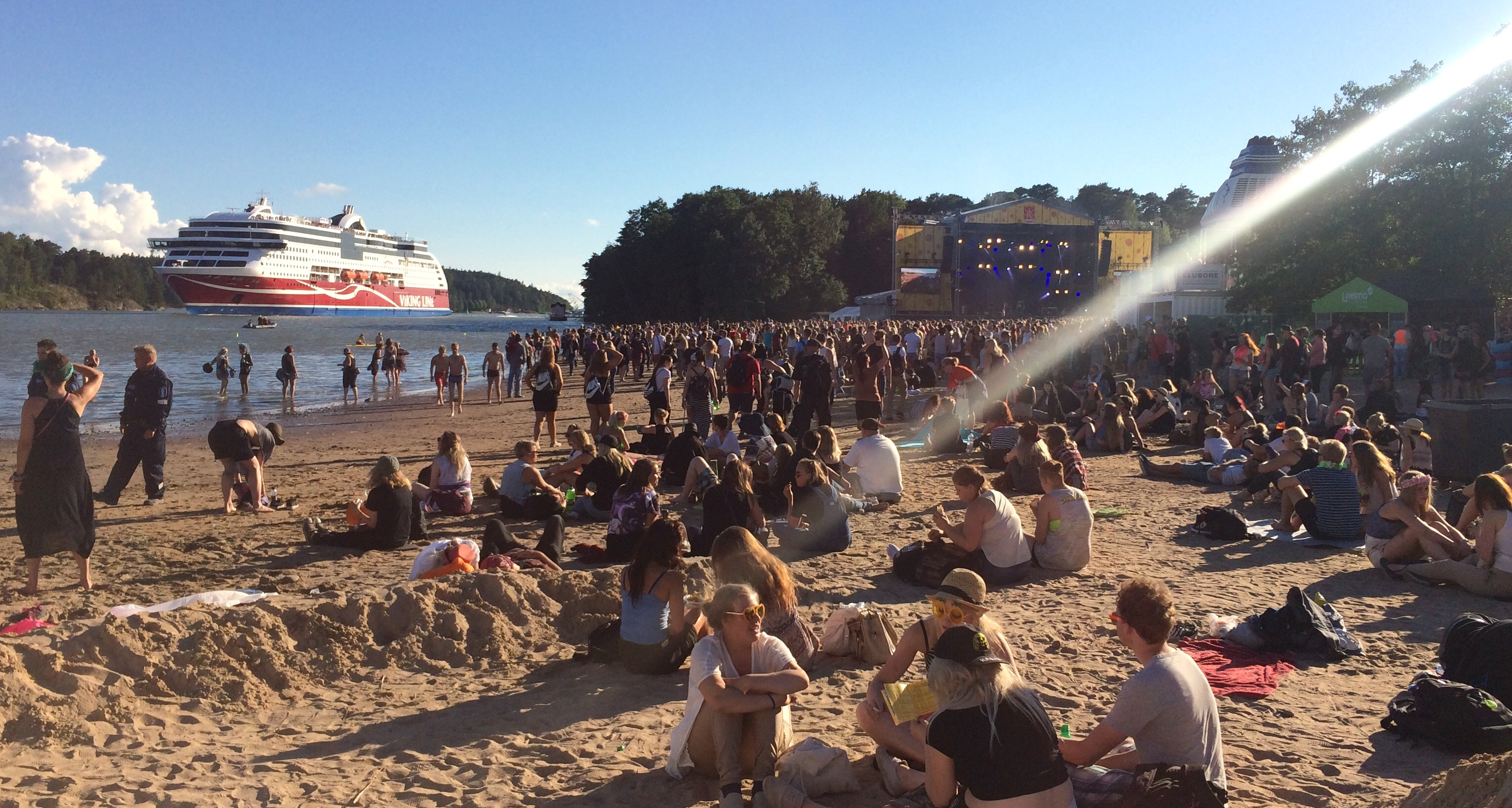
Ruisrock 2016 in Kansanpuisto Park.

Ruissalo (Finnish: [ˈrui̯sˌsɑlo]; Swedish: Runsala) is an island in the Archipelago Sea and a district of the city of Turku, Finland. The island is located to the south-west of the city, between Hirvensalo and Pansio in the mainland. It is rather sparsely populated, having a population of only 126 (as of 2004), with an annual growth rate of 3.97%. The villas on the island are considered culturally and historically valuable in Finland. Some are used as guesthouses; some are owned and run by foundations, labor unions, sports teams, and private enterprises in the area; some can be rented freely for days for private parties such as weddings; some have cafeterias in them. Private ownership exists – a couple villas even have renters with very selective occupancy. Some villas have deteriorated because of the high maintenance costs due to the historical building methods that must be used here.

One of the largest old oak forests in Finland is situated on the island and many parts of it are included in nature conservation programs. According to Karhu et al., “the total area of the oak-dominated woodland is 170 hectares, representing approximately the half of all oak-forests of Finland.”

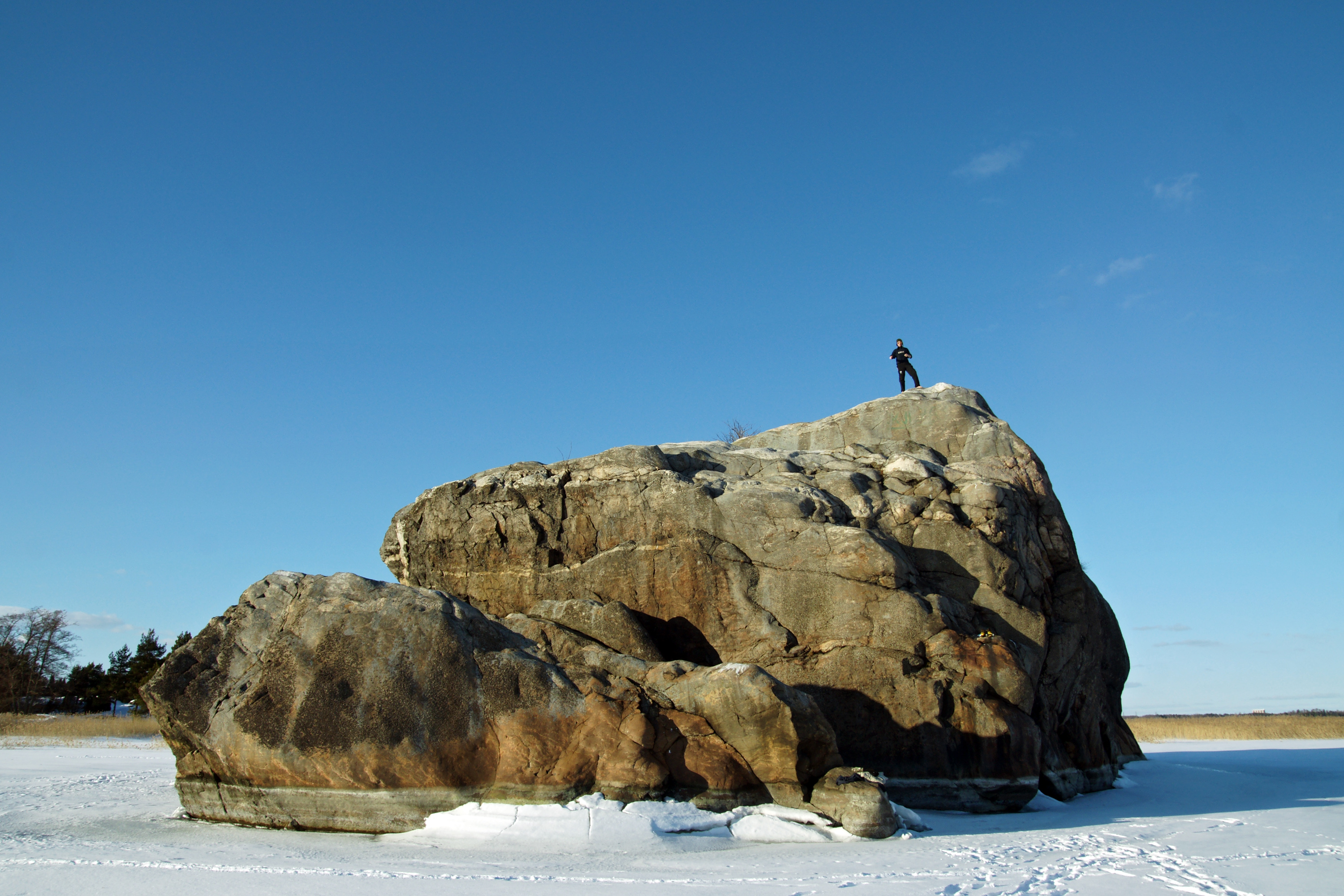
Kukkarokivi at Ruissalo in March 2013

In the westernmost part of the island there is a spa and a camping area. Turku golf course is also situated here. The botanical garden of the University of Turku is situated in the middle of the island. Near the southern tip of the western part of the island was once a small, unofficial nude beach. Official nude beaches in Finland can only be found in Helsinki and in Pori.

15.08% of the district's population are under 15 years old, while 13.49% are over 65. The district's linguistic makeup is 88.89% Finnish, 8.73% Swedish, and 2.38% other.

The island hosts the annual rock festival Ruisrock. The Paavo Nurmi Marathon route goes through Ruissalo.

Ruissalo was bombarded by British warships on 22 August 1854, during the Crimean War, in an incident known as the Skirmish of Ruissalo.

== See also ==
- Districts of Turku
- Districts of Turku by population
