= Paavo Nurmi Marathon (Turku) =

- Date: August
- Location: Turku, Finland
- Event type: Road
- Distance: Marathon
- Established: 1992
- Course records: Men's: 2:18:58 (1994) (Japan) Noriaki Kiguchi; Women's: 2:37:22 (1995) (Belarus) Volha Yudenkova
- Website: Paavo Nurmi Marathon
- Participants: 412 (2021); 354 (2020); 775 (2019)

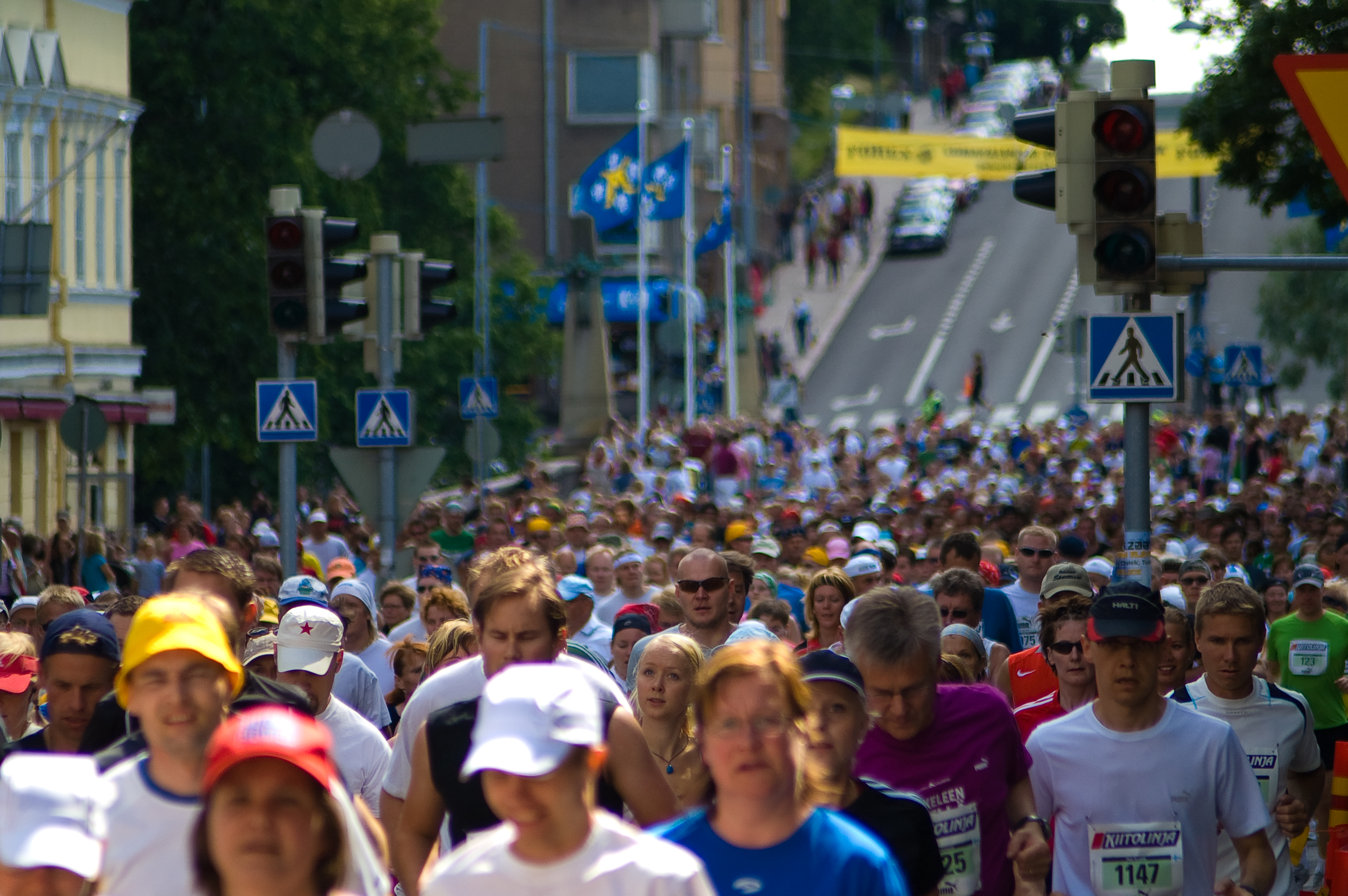
Aurakatu during the 2007 event

The Paavo Nurmi Marathon is an annual marathon road running race held during summer in Turku, Finland, the birth city of Paavo Nurmi. Although various marathons have been held in Turku since 1910, the Paavo Nurmi Marathon was established in 1992. It is arranged along with Paavo Nurmi Games, a part of Paavo Nurmi happening week. The route goes through Turku city and Ruissalo park. The marathon attracts yearly 500 to 1000 participants.

== Past results ==
Key: Course record

Edition	Year	Men's winner	Time (h:m:s)	Women's winner	Time (h:m:s)
1st	1992	Paweł Tarasiuk (POL)	2:21:16	Marina Ivanova (RUS)	2:44:02
2nd	1993	Paweł Tarasiuk (POL)	2:22:15	Anita Liepiņa (LAT)	2:53:39
3rd	1994	Noriaki Kiguchi (JPN)	2:18:58	Svetlana Netchaeva (RUS)	2:43:48
4th	1995	Nikolay Kolesnikov (RUS)	2:19:32	Volha Yudenkova (BLR)	2:37:22
5th	1996	Emanuel Sarwatt (TAN)	2:22:45	Larisa Malikova (RUS)	2:45:35
6th	1997	Cephas Matafi (ZIM)	2:20:14	Nadezhda Yefremova (RUS)	2:51:19
7th	1998	Cephas Matafi (ZIM)	2:21:12	Hiroi Kazama (JPN)	2:54:43
8th	1999	William Musyoki (KEN)	2:20:19	Tatyana Mironova (RUS)	2:59:56
9th	2000	Joseph Mutinda (KEN)	2:23:46	Tatyana Maslova (RUS)	2:45:55
10th	2001	Markku Salo (FIN)	2:46:01	Minna Tiihonen (FIN)	3:14:34
11th	2002	Teppo Ronkainen (FIN)	2:38:31	Merianni Varjo (FIN)	3:25:25
12th	2003	Dainius Šaučikovas (LTU)	2:28:58	Eija Apunen (FIN)	3:16:43
13th	2004	Petri Saavalainen (FIN)	2:24:22	Marjaana Lahti-Koski (FIN)	2:55:38
14th	2005	Reimar Hartikainen (FIN)	2:41:14	Lilja Kaarina (FIN)	3:18:55
15th	2006	Emil Söderlund (FIN)	2:53:37	Pauliina Tommola (FIN)	3:09:15
16th	2007	David Kanyari (KEN)	2:44:57	Pauliina Tommola (FIN)	3:01:10
17th	2008	Janne Klasila (FIN)	2:47:01	Pauliina Tommola (FIN)	3:02:36
18th	2009	Janne Klasila (FIN)	2:47:59	Pauliina Tommola (FIN)	3:02:31
19th	2010	Janne Klasila (FIN)	2:50:39	Laura Nieminen (FIN)	3:21:31
20th	2011	Janne Klasila (FIN)	2:49:54	Outi Sivosavi (FIN)	3:30:10
21st	2012	Janne Klasila (FIN)	2:41:38	Laura Nieminen (FIN)	3:15:57
22nd	2013	Jyrki Kukko (FIN)	2:40:04	Elina Junnila (FIN)	2:55:06
23rd	2014	Ole-Antti Halonen (FIN)	2:37:35	Julia Jacobsson (FIN)	3:29:40
24th	2015	Thijs Feuth (NED)	2:30:55	Tiina Alhonen (FIN)	3:13:13
25th	2016	Thijs Feuth (NED)	2:35:11	Biljana Cvijanović (SRB)	3:05:06
26th	2017	Ole-Antti Halonen (FIN)	2:32:26	Elina Junnila (FIN)	3:11:50
27th	2018	Ole-Antti Halonen (FIN)	2:31:10	Pia-Maria Grandell (FIN)	3:07:58
28th	2019	Ole-Antti Halonen (FIN)	2:27:41	Eeva Feuth (FIN)	2:59:30
29th	2020	Ole-Antti Halonen (FIN)	2:35:09	Soili Kosonen (FIN)	3:02:50
30th	2021	Henri Ansio (FIN)	2:33:41	Eeva Feuth (FIN)	2:54:41
31st	2022	Kristian Lindroos (FIN)	2:31:03	Aino Niemi (FIN)	2:45:41
32nd	2023	Mbacha Eric Mangeh (CMR)	2:34:25	Elina Suomela (FIN)	3:22:45
33rd	2024	Peter Čudrňák (SVK)	2:37:50	Eeva Feuth (FIN)	2:51:37

== See also ==
- Helsinki City Marathon
