= Do (Trebinje) =

Do До
- Village
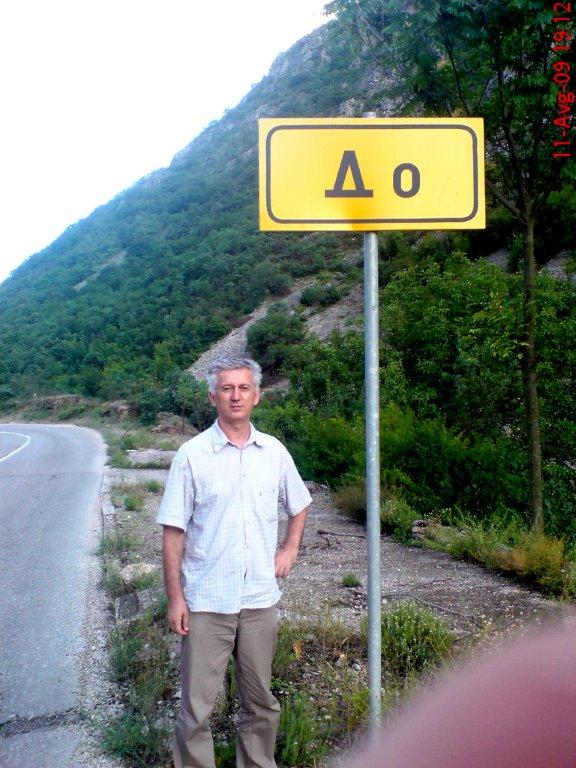
- Puzzle creator Slavko Bovan next to the board with the name of village Do

- Location within Bosnia and Herzegovina
- Coordinates: 42°54′00″N 18°01′45″E
- Country: Bosnia and Herzegovina
- Entity: Republika Srpska
- Municipality: Trebinje
- Time zone: UTC+1 (CET)
  - Summer (DST): UTC+2 (CEST)

Do (Serbian Cyrillic: До) is a village in the municipality of Trebinje, Bosnia and Herzegovina.
