= Cephas Yao Agbemenu =

Ghanaian sculptor and educator

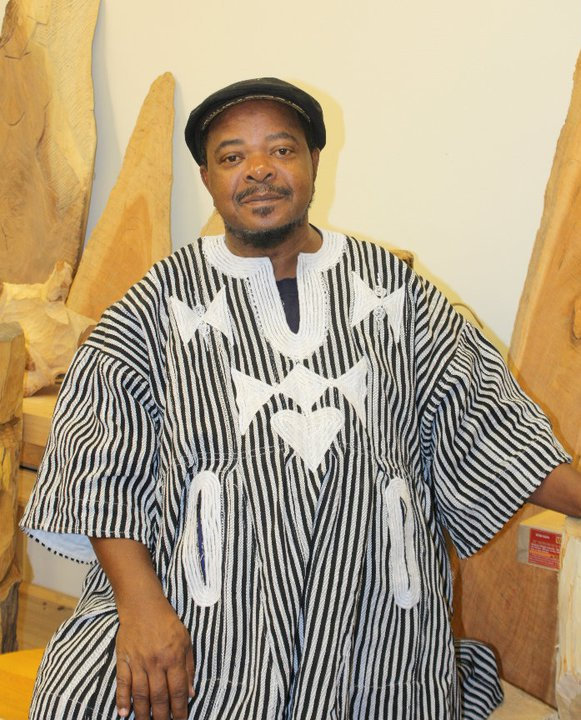
- Fulbright Scholar and artist
- Born: 29 May 1951; Leklebi-Kame, in the Volta Region of Ghana, West Africa
- Occupations: Artist, educator
- Known for: Wood carving

Cephas Yao Agbemenu (born 29 May 1951) is a Ghanaian sculptor, and educator. He is an art professor who teaches at the Kenyatta University in Nairobi, Kenya. He is a sculptor and a traditional African wood carver who sees parallels between his carvings and life.

== Biography ==
Cephas Yao Agbemenu was born on 29 May 1951 in Leklebi-Kame, in the Volta Region of Ghana, West Africa.

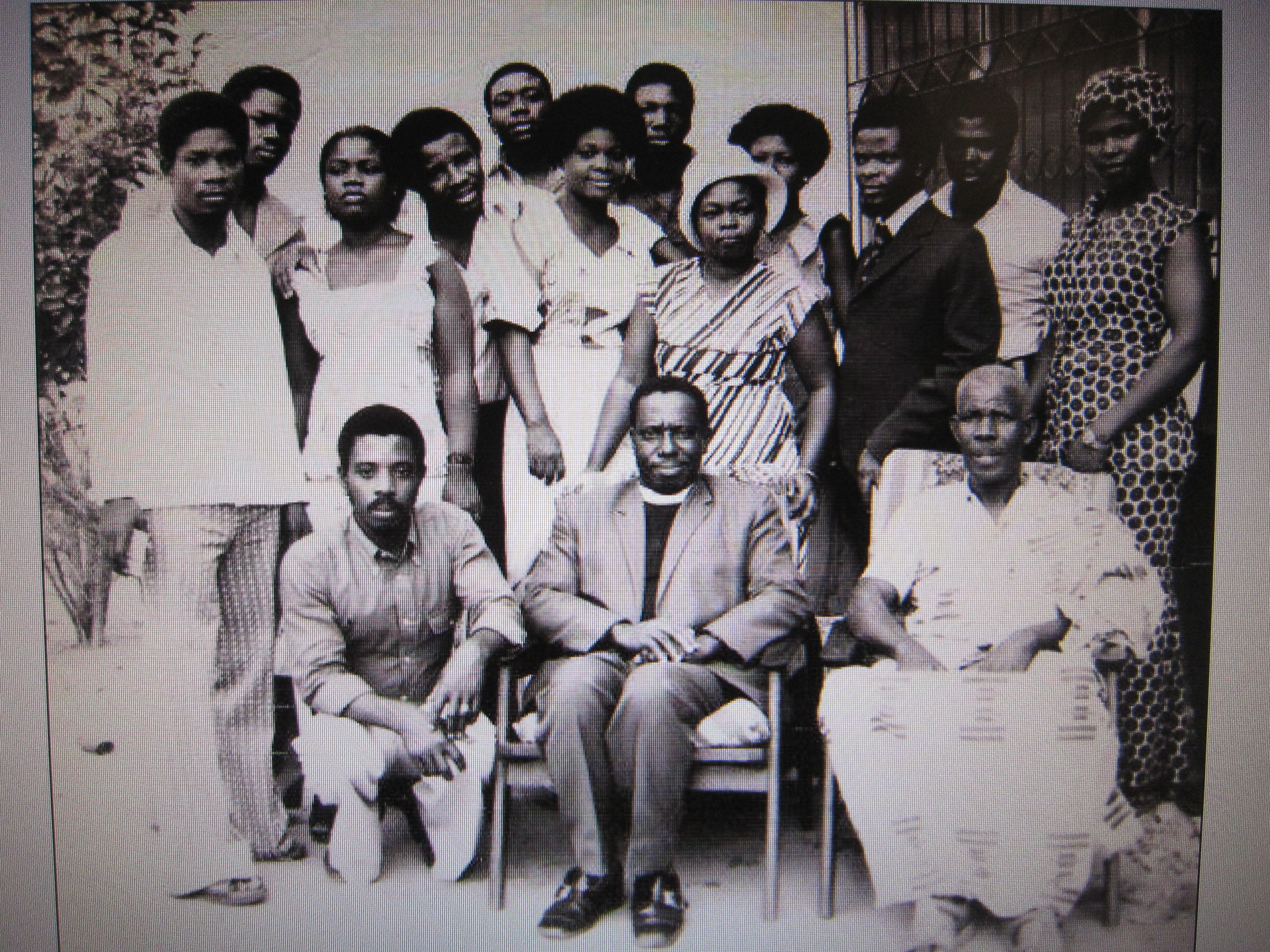
Family Portrait taken before Cephas Yao Agbemenu left for the US in 1978, he is third from the right, standing, wearing a dark suit.

He grew up in Ghana, going to school where art and crafts lessons were a part of the curriculum. He also learned farming, backyard gardening, fishing, trapping, and hunting, tasks that helped him to develop his coordination and visual skills.

Agbemenu went on to secondary school at Evangelical Presbyterian Secondary School in Hohoe, Volta Region, where he took his Ordinary-Level School Certificate in art, English language, Ewe language, maths, general science, principles of accounts, and geography.

He then attended Kpandu Secondary School, Volta Region. He completed this program with Advanced-Level School Certificate, his major subjects being art, economics, geography, and general studies in the year of 1972.

In June 1976 he completed a bachelor's degree in Fine Art with First Class Honours at the Kwame Nkrumah University of Science and Technology, Kumasi, Ghana, studying in sculpture, painting, art history, English literature, art appreciation, and African studies.

Agbemenu then obtained his Master of Fine Arts Degree from the State University of New York at Buffalo (February 1980). His major subject was sculpture, including wood carving, P.O.P, concrete and bronze casting, with painting, drawing and art history as his minors.

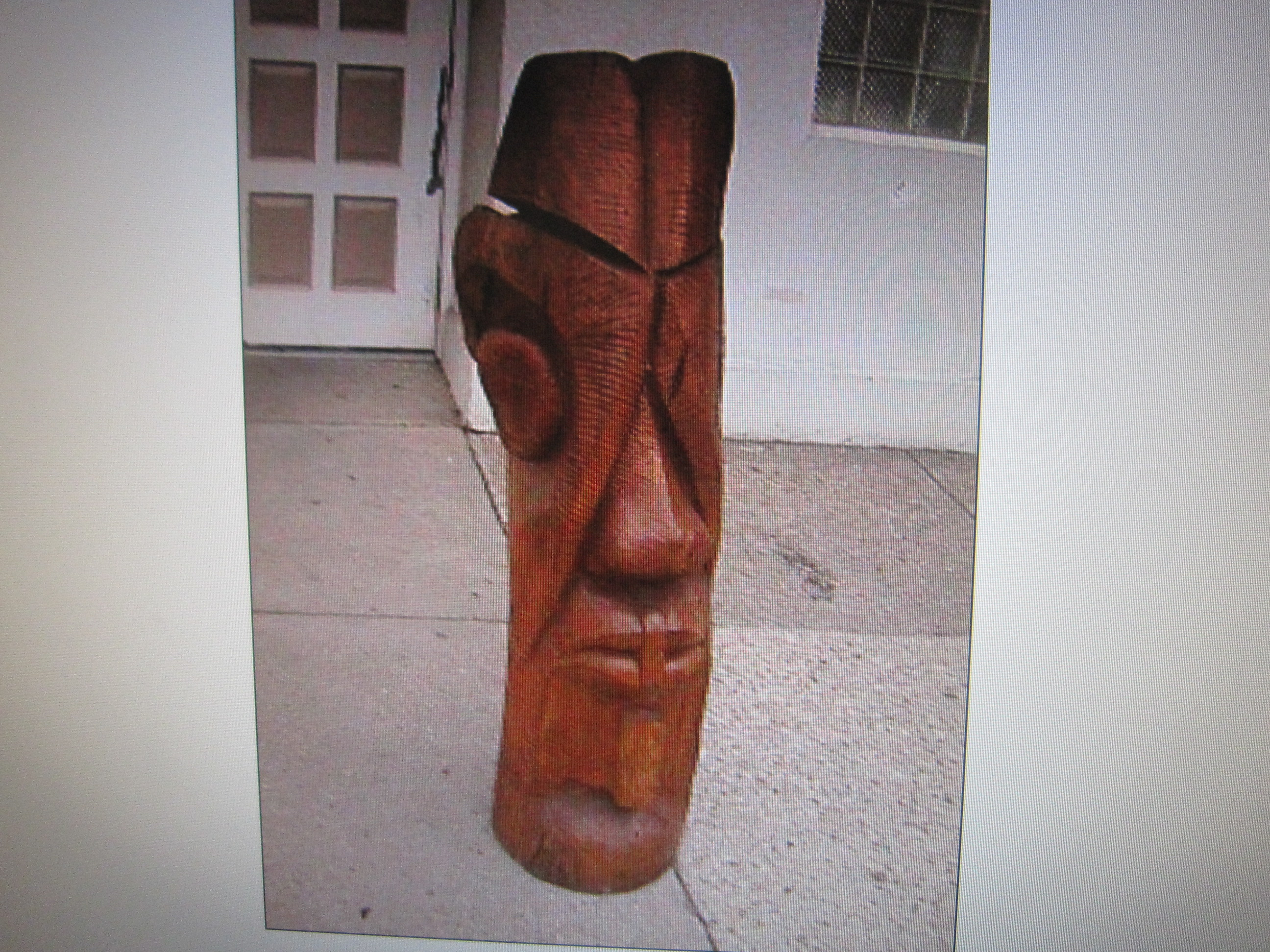
Cephas' Sculpture "Freedom of Speech" 1980. Notice the padlock over the lips. Sculpture was carved from Elmwood.

== Teaching and career ==
Agbemenu started to teach at the Kwame Nkrumah University of Science and Technology in 1977, teaching on art, sculpture and drawing.

He has taught African art, sculpture, and Black history in a global perspective in many different countries, along with ceramics, African history, culture, European art history and African carvings.

In 1987 he started as a Senior Lecturer in the Department of Fine Art, Kenyatta University, Nairobi, Kenya, teaching classes on topics like contemporary African art, sculpture, and traditional African wood carving.

== Fulbright Scholar ==
Agbemenu was awarded the prestigious Fulbright Scholarship, which enabled him to visit to the United States to teach at two colleges in Pennsylvania. The first was Reading Area Community College in the city of Reading where he gave lessons on African wood carving and participated in a dialogue titled "The Spiritual Dimension in Art" with art professor Tullio DeSantis on 2 March 2010. Agbemenu has said: "It's not necessary to pursue art, but I think it's necessary to pursue artistic thinking; the thinking that there is an alternative solution."

Agbemenu then travelled to Montgomery County Community College in Blue Bell, Pennsylvania, c/o Dr. Aaron Shatzman from January 2010 to June 2010 as part of the scholar-in-residence program. Agbemenu taught contemporary African art and culture in addition to conducting studio classes in traditional African wood carving. The basic tools used for his wood carving classes were straight and spoon gouges, chisels, carving knives, and veiners. He was quoted as saying: "America is seen as the citadel of knowledge and power. That is why many of us chose to come to the United States for graduate studies. My presence at Montgomery County Community College will be measured in both theory and practice, in terms of cross-cultural understanding in this period of globalization."

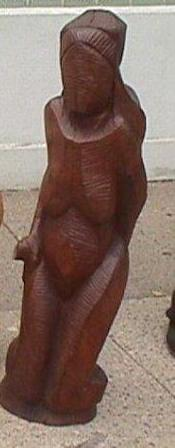
Cephas' Sculpture "Noble Burdens Front View" 1980 Mother and Child

== African proverbs ==
Agbemenu was a member of and contributor to the African Proverbs, Stories, and Sayings Committee chaired by Father Joseph Healey founded in Nairobi, Kenya. In June 2008, Professor Agbemenu was awarded a grant to compile a booklet of 100 Ewe Ghana Proverbs with African Symbols as illustrations of the proverbs, translated into English. The work has been published on the www.afriprov.org website under the theme of "Reconciliation and Peace".

A Collection of Ewe Proverbs was published with illustrations and translations by Cephas Yao Agbemenu on 1 November 2010.
