= Cephas Matafi =

Zimbabwean long-distance runner

Cephas Matafi (born May 24, 1971) is a Zimbabwean long-distance runner. He competed for his native country at the 1992 Summer Olympics in Barcelona, Spain, where he finished in 58th place (2:26:17) in the men's marathon race. His personal best time is 2:15:14 hours, achieved in 1992. He is a two-time champion of the Paavo Nurmi Marathon (Turku) in Finland.

== Achievements ==
Year	Competition	Venue	Position	Event	Notes
Representing Zimbabwe
1992	Olympic Games	Barcelona, Spain	58th	Marathon	2:26:17
1994	Commonwealth Games	Victoria, Canada	22nd	Marathon	2:24:13
