= Céphas Bansah =

Ghanaian chief

Togbe Ngoryifia Céphas Kosi Bansah
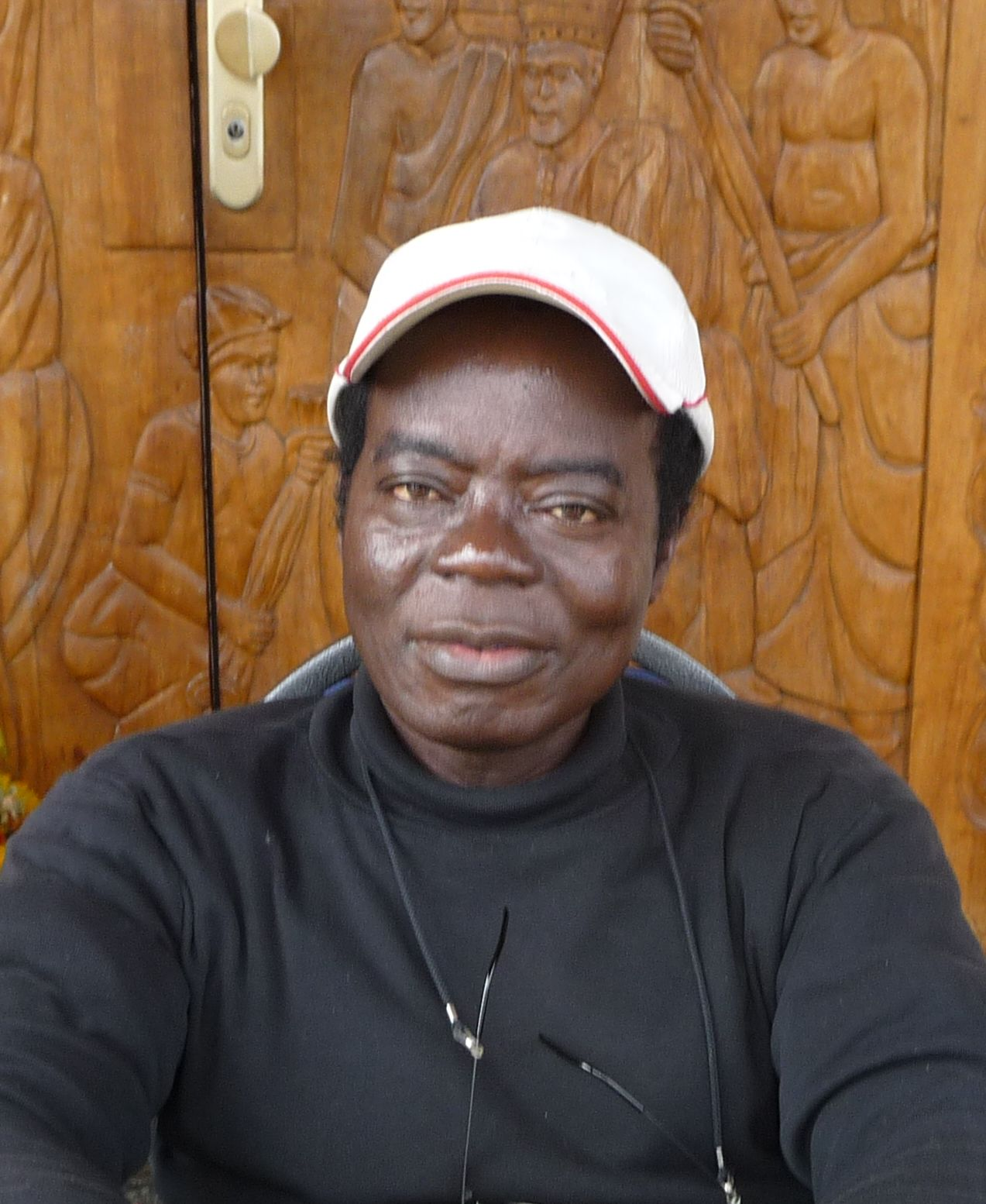
- Born: 22 August 1948 (age 76); Gold Coast (now Ghana)
- Spouse: Gabrielle Bansah (m. 2000)
- Children: 3

Togbe Ngoryifia Céphas Kosi Bansah (born 22 August 1948), also known as Céphas Bansah, is the Ngoryifia ("developmental chief") of the Gbi Traditional area of Hohoe, Ghana.

He resides in Ludwigshafen, Rhineland-Palatinate in Germany.

== Biography ==
=== Early life ===
Céphas Bansah grew up in the Volta Region of what is now Ghana (then the Gold Coast), and first visited Germany in 1970 during a student exchange program. He took an apprenticeship at the firm Paul Schweitzer in Ludwigshafen am Rhein, and went on to earn two German Master Craftsman certificates: the first was a Master Craftsman as mechanic for agricultural machinery and the second as mechanic for vehicles. He also took up boxing in his spare time, and in 1975 became the district flyweight champion.

He has made the statement: "I had two reasons why I wanted to come to Germany: firstly, my interest in pursuing a career to use and reinforce the experience gained in my apprenticeship and secondly, to gain an insight into the 'typical' German attitudes – the inflexible sense of duty, discipline, diligence, and ambition."

=== Appointment ===
In 1987, Céphas Bansah was given the honorary title of "developmental chief" (Ngoryifia) based on his status as a native living abroad to promote development efforts in the Gbi traditional area. Céphas Bansah has decided to continue living in Germany, as he felt he could do more to help his people from abroad. He now runs a workshop of his own in Ludwigshafen, and is in regular contact with his family in Ghana, who he visits a few times a year. The Gbi Traditional Council made a press release in 2014 stating that, contrary to German and English language reports describing Bansah as a "king", his title of Developmental Chief ("Ngoryifia") is honorary, has been bestowed to a number of different people by the Council, and can be revoked. The Gbi traditional area is instead led by a Paramount Chief ("Fiaga"), who is presently Togbega Gabusu VI.

=== Charity ===
He has established a non-profit organization to raise funds for the people of Hohoe. In Ludwigshafen, he was able through his good relations with the farmers to collect containers full of water pumps and pipes. They were shipped to Ghana and served to supply many people's homes with clean drinking water. Further items such as electricity poles and a new church bell for the Hohoe Evangelical Presbyterian Church were sent in subsequent containers. The town's hospital, which had been understaffed and inadequately equipped, was much improved by donations of medical equipment, wheelchairs, ambulance vehicles, and twenty-two German doctors. He also supervised the construction of a new bridge over the River Dayi, replacing a dangerously unstable earlier bridge, and with the assistance of the town of Heiligkreuzsteinach and a private donor, built a jail to house women and children so that they will no longer have to be housed with male detainees.

=== Media ===
He has worked as an entertainer and musician, and makes many media appearances to generate interest for his charitable projects. He has been on many television shows with almost every German television station and as a guest on many other national and international television shows, even with the ORF (television broadcaster) in Austria. In September 1995, his installation as the "Superior and Spiritual Chief of the Ewe people" in Notse in Togo – a recognition of his hard work, development achievements, and continuous support for the Ewe people – was covered by the ZDF.

Ngoryifia Céphas Kosi Bansah has explained: "...people approached over and over again with questions about Ghana and about other African states. These people had never had personal contact with an African before. Their initial reservations about the continent were dispelled, and they considered me a mediator and representative for the whole of Africa. They asked for advice about traveling, for commercial contacts, and how they can be supportive in numerous developmental ventures."

He has produced and published six CDs of his songs and music, including a version of "O Tannenbaum" in his native language, and his World Cup 2006 song "King Football". The German author Horst O. Hermanni has written a biography of Céphas Bansah with the title "Majestät im Blauen Anton" (His Majesty in Blue Overalls).

In 2014, he participated at the fourth Mensch ärgere Dich nicht World Championships in the Wiesloch district of Baiertal, Germany.

=== Marriage ===
Céphas Bansah married his German wife Gabriele in 2000, and has three children.
