= Unui Doo =

Chinese New Zealand businesswoman (ca. 1874–1940)

- Born: Chan Yau-nui c. 1874; Xinhui, Guangdong, China
- Died: August 18, 1940; Auckland, New Zealand
- Resting place: Waikumete Cemetery
- Other names: Grandmother Doo
- Occupations: Businesswoman, shopkeeper
- Known for: Matriarch of the Doo clan Leadership in Auckland’s Chinese community
- Spouse: Thomas Wong Doo (m. 1898, remarried 1915)
- Children: 5

Unui Doo (born Chan Yau-nui; c. 1874 – 18 August 1940) was a Chinese New Zealand businesswoman and shopkeeper. Born in Xinhui, Guangdong, she immigrated to New Zealand in 1915. She managed a grocery store in Auckland that served as a social centre for the Chinese community. Known as "Grandmother Doo", she was the matriarch of the Doo clan and one of the few Chinese women living in New Zealand before the 1930s.

== Early life and marriage ==
Chan Yau-nui was born in Xinhui, Guangdong, China, sometime between 1873 and 1875. She was one of seven children born to She Hoo Tai and Chan Doon Tai, a farmer and rice merchant. She had no formal education and her feet were bound. She married Thomas Wong Doo in Canton in 1898. Her husband had lived in Auckland, New Zealand, from the age of 13 and married her upon returning to China. He then returned to New Zealand when he was 22, where he was employed as a market gardener, visiting her in China every few years. During this time, they had two sons and a daughter. He became a naturalised citizen of New Zealand in 1904.

== Life in New Zealand ==
Unui and her children joined her husband, immigrating to New Zealand in 1915. In accordance with New Zealand law, she remarried him the same year. They had two more children, another daughter and a son. They ran an import-export business and managed a grocery store in central Auckland that sold Chinese goods, including herbal medicines, soya sauce and rice. They exported edible fungus. Their home and grocery store were located on Wakefield Street in Auckland before moving to Victoria Street West. Their store became a cultural centre for other immigrants arriving from China. Their store functioned as a bank, post office, and social club, that catered mostly to single Chinese men. She was a member of the Kwong Cheu Club, a social club in Auckland for Chinese immigrants from Guangdong. She made several trips to China and was one of the few Chinese women living in New Zealand in her era. During the 1918 Spanish flu epidemic, she produced an herbal tonic that was made available for free to the community.

Unui had an important leadership role within the Chinese community of New Zealand. She was known as "Grandmother Doo" and was the matriarch of her family clan. She selected women for her sons to marry, giving them tests in mathematics and calligraphy, and ensuring they were literate. Unui revered Guan Yu, and her family were worshippers of him.

She died on 18 August 1940, in Auckland. She was buried in Waikumete Cemetery in a well attended funeral service.
