= Doo rag =

Doo rag may refer to:

- Durag, a head covering
- Doo Rag, a 1990s American band
- "Doo Rag", a song by Galactic from the 1996 album Coolin' Off
