= D0 =

D0 may refer to:

- d^{0}, the d electron count of a transition metal complex
- D^{0} meson
- D0︀ experiment, at the Tevatron collider at Fermilab, in Batavia, Illinois, US
- D0 motorway (Czech Republic), the partially complete outer ring road of Prague
- Dangling bond, in chemistry
- DHL Air Limited (IATA code)

== See also ==
- 0D (disambiguation)
- DO (disambiguation)
