= Arlo Hemphill =

American wilderness advocate

- Born: Arlo Hanlin Hemphill; Baltimore, Maryland, United States
- Occupations: Conservationist, Wilderness Advocate
- Website: www.arlohemphill.com

Arlo Hanlin Hemphill is an American wilderness advocate. Hemphill is currently leading Greenpeace USA's Protect the Oceans campaign to stop deep sea mining. He is credited for his expertise pertaining to the Greater Caribbean biodiversity hotspots.

His educational background is in marine biology, and Hemphill is best known for his involvement in regional-scale ocean conservation.
