= Do, Stolac =

Do
- Village
- Location within Bosnia and Herzegovina
- Coordinates: 43.0783069°N 18.0318904°E
- Country: Bosnia and Herzegovina
- Entity: Republika Srpska; Federation of Bosnia and Herzegovina
- Canton: Herzegovina-Neretva
- Municipality: Berkovići; Stolac

Area
  - Total: 4.29 sq mi (11.10 km^{2})

Population (2013)
  - Total: 36
  - Density: 8.4/sq mi (3.2/km^{2})
- Time zone: UTC+1 (CET)
  - Summer (DST): UTC+2 (CEST)

Do is a village in the municipalities of Berkovići, Republika Srpska, and Stolac, the Herzegovina-Neretva Canton, the Federation of Bosnia and Herzegovina, Bosnia and Herzegovina.

== Demographics ==
According to the 2013 census, its population was 36: 34 Serbs in the Berkovići part, with a Serb and an undeclared person living in the Stolac part.
