= The Duke of Edinburgh, Brixton =

Pub in Brixton, London

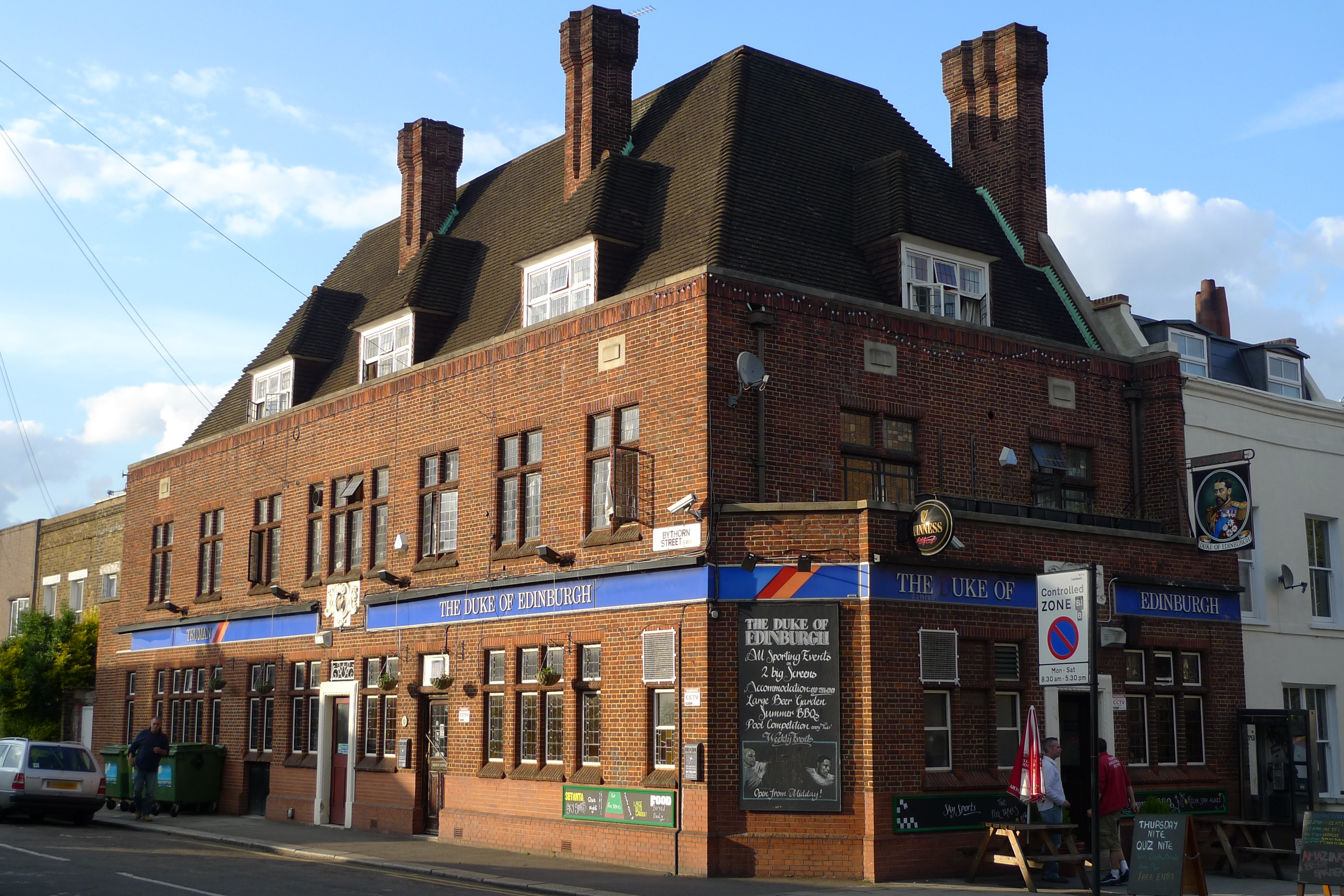
- The Duke of Edinburgh

- Location within London Borough of Lambeth Location within Greater London

General information
- Location: 204 Ferndale Road, Brixton, London, England
- Coordinates: 51.463319°N 0.120042°W

Design and construction
- Designations

Listed Building – Grade II
- Official name: The Duke of Edinburgh
- Designated: 24 August 2015
- Reference no.: 1427801

The Duke of Edinburgh is a Grade II listed public house at 204 Ferndale Road, Brixton, London, SW9 8AG.

It was built in 1936–37 for Truman's Brewery, and designed by their in-house architect A. E. Sewell.

It was Grade II listed in 2015 by Historic England.

In November 2019, following a three-hour meeting of Lambeth London Borough Council's licensing sub-committee, The Duke of Edinburgh was given a new licence, subject to 80 conditions, specifically no more than 550 individuals in the garden and any outside televisions must be silent.
