= Kefas Japhet =

Nigerian politician

Kefas Japhet is a Nigerian politician. He currently serves as the Majority Leader, representing the Gombi constituency in the Adamawa State House of Assembly.
