= Doe (surname) =

Doe is a surname. Notable people with the surname include:

- Brian Doe (1862–1941), Australian politician
- Charles Doe (1898–1995), American rugby union player.
- David Doe (born 2000), Canadian soccer player
- Donald Brian Doe (1920–2005), British archaeologist and architect
- Edward M. Doe (1850–1919), American jurist
- Francis Doe (born 1985), Liberian footballer
- Fred Doe (1864–1938), American baseball pitcher
- Janet Doe (1895–1985), medical librarian
- John Doe or Jane Doe, a name used as a placeholder for an unknown or anonymous person, especially in a legal context
- Joseph Doe (1855–1925), American military officer, politician and baseball player
- Lindsey Doe (born 1981/1982), sexologist and sex educator
- Michael Doe (businessman) (died 1990), British-Liberian businessman
- Michael Doe (bishop) (born 1947), British bishop
- Nancy Doe (1949–2025), First Lady of Liberia, wife of Samuel
- Nicholas B. Doe (1786–1856), American politician
- Samuel Doe (1951–1990), leader of Liberia (1980–1990)
- Samuel Gbaydee Doe (born 1966), peacebuilding and conflict analyst from Liberia
- Thomas Doe (1912–1969), American bobsledder
- William Doe (1941–2022), Australian professor
