= Dō (martial arts) =

Dō is the go-on vocalization of the Japanese kanji 道, corresponding to Mandarin Chinese (pinyin) dào, meaning "way", with connotations of "philosophy, doctrine" (see Tao).

In Asian martial arts, the word has been widely adopted as the term for a "school" or "discipline", especially in "Old School" (koryū- 古流) lineages of Japanese martial arts, such as the Kashima Shin-ryū (鹿島神流), although its use in the greater martial arts community has become much more widespread as a synonym of jutsu 術 "technique, method".

== Japanese martial arts ==
- Aikidō (合気道), the Way of harmonious spirit
- Gendai budō (現代武道), modern warrior way, the group of martial disciplines that arose after the Meiji restoration
- Hojōjutsu, a Japanese martial art of restraining a prisoners using cord or rope.
- Iaidō (居合道), a Japanese martial art associated with the smooth, controlled movements of drawing the sword
- Jōdō (杖道), the Way of the jō, wooden staff fighting
- Jūdō (柔道), the "gentle way", a grappling martial art
- Jūkendō (銃剣), the Way of the bayonet, bayonet fighting
- Karatedō or karate (空手道), the Way of the empty hand, Okinawan boxing
- Kashima Shin-ryū (鹿島神流), a classical Japanese martial discipline
- Kendō (剣道), the Way of the sword, fencing with bamboo swords
- Kyūdō, (弓道), the Way of the bow, archery, Hand-to-hand fighting recently evolved from karate
- Taidō (躰道), the Way of the body, Hand-to-hand fighting evolved from Okinawan karate
- Yoseikan Budō (養正館武道), the teaching truth place warrior Way

== Korean martial arts ==
The word "道" is used in quite the same way in Korean language and culture, and is pronounced identically with its Japanese cognate as Dō.

- Taekwon-Do (태권도; 跆拳道), the Way of the foot and the fist

a Korean martial art with roots in Taekkyon

- Kumdo (검도; 劍道), the Way of the Sword

Korean fencing with roots in Japanese Kendo

- Hapkido (합기도; 合氣道), the Way of the harmonious spirit

a Korean martial art which shares history with Japanese Aikido

== Other ==
- Kyushindō, the Way of longing for knowledge of the fundamental nature of anything, Japanese-inspired Western school of hand-to-hand fighting
