= SAHRIT =

The Human Rights Trust of Southern Africa, better known as SAHRIT, is a human rights groups established in October 2006 to promote human rights in Southern Africa. It has its headquarters in Harare.
