= The Duke of Edinburgh Hotel =

Hotel in Barrow-in-Furness, Cumbria, England

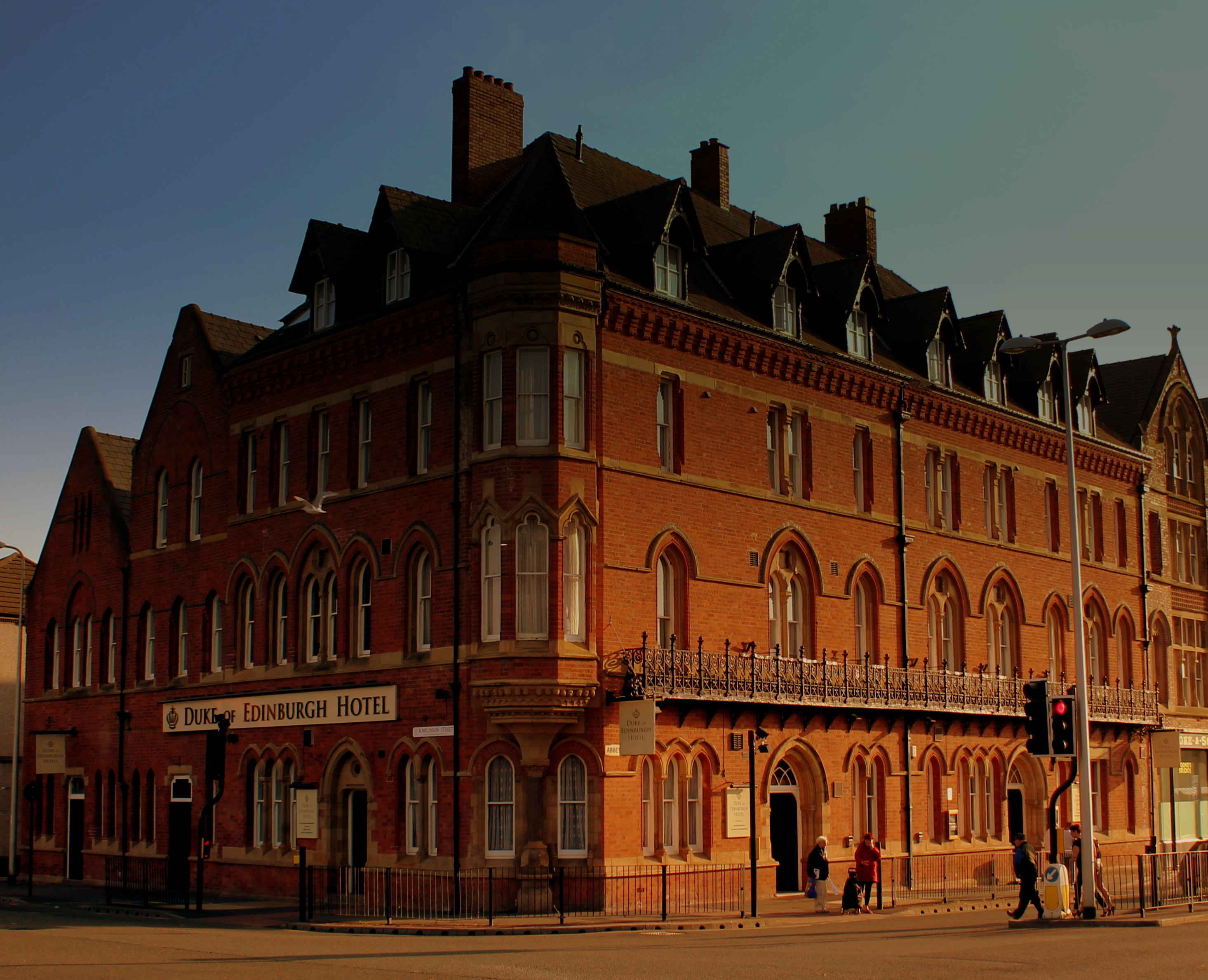
- Interactive map of the The Duke of Edinburgh Hotel area

General information
- Location: Barrow-in-Furness, England, United Kingdom
- Coordinates: 54.1168°N 3.2257°W

Technical details
- Floor count: 4

Other information
- Number of rooms: 30
- Number of restaurants: 1

Website
- The Duke of Edinburgh Hotel

The Duke of Edinburgh Hotel is a 4-star luxury hotel located on Abbey Road in Barrow-in-Furness, England. The building itself was built from 1871, opening in 1873 and was granted grade II status in 1976. The hotel was built during a period of great economic growth in Barrow, the town was home to the largest steelworks in the world and one of the most important shipyards in the country. The Duke of Edinburgh Hotel soon became Barrow's most prestigious and attracted dignitaries and celebrities from across the world; some of the more notable examples being Charlie Chaplin, D. H. Lawrence and Cary Grant.

In 2006, The Duke of Edinburgh Hotel was bought by C2 Investment (Lancaster Brewery) who spent in excess of £3.5 million renovating the building inside and out. The hotel now includes 51 en-suite bedrooms, the 'Consort Bar and Grill' as well as a 100 capacity sub terranean function room called the Vault.

== See also ==
- Listed buildings in Barrow-in-Furness
