= Diboraanthracene =

Class of boron heterocyclic compounds

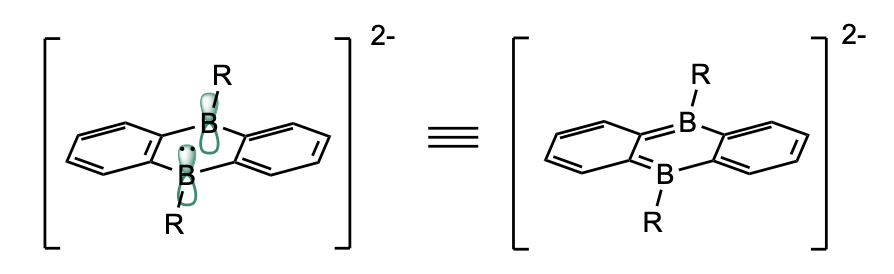
Figure 1. Structure of DBA^{2-}.

Diboraanthracene is a class of boron heterocyclic compounds in which two boron atoms substitute two carbon atoms in anthracene (C_{14}H_{10}), one of the typical polycyclic aromatic hydrocarbons (PAHs). The most well-studied diboraanthracene is 9,10-disubstituted-9,10-diboraanthracene (DBA) and its doubly reduced dianion (DBA^{2-}). DBA can be readily derivatized and polymerized to afford novel optoelectronic materials with tunable properties. DBA is also a bidentate lewis acid that forms adducts with lewis bases and catalyzes certain Diels-Alder reactions. The dianion DBA^{2-} is formally a mixed-valence, main-group ambiphile with a B(I)/B(III) frustrated lewis pair (FLP)., but the extra electrons are effectively delocalized in the aromatic system. Therefore, DBA^{2-} exhibits both FLP- and transition metal-like reactivities, enabling the activation of a variety of small molecules through distinct pathways and mechanisms

== Synthesis ==
=== Synthesis of DBA ===
The most widely used synthetic route to DBA utilizes electrophilic borylation chemistry as the key transformation, which dates to 1969 from Seibert et al. and 1998 from Eisch et al. Starting with the commercially available chemical 1,2-dibromobenzene, lithium-halogen exchange followed by silylation yields 1,2-bis(trimethylsilyl) benzene as the intermediate. Subjecting this intermediate to the lewis acid BX_{3} (X = halogen) results in 9,10-dihalogenated-DBA. Subsequent alkylation with organolithium reagents affords different 9,10-functionalized DBA derivatives.

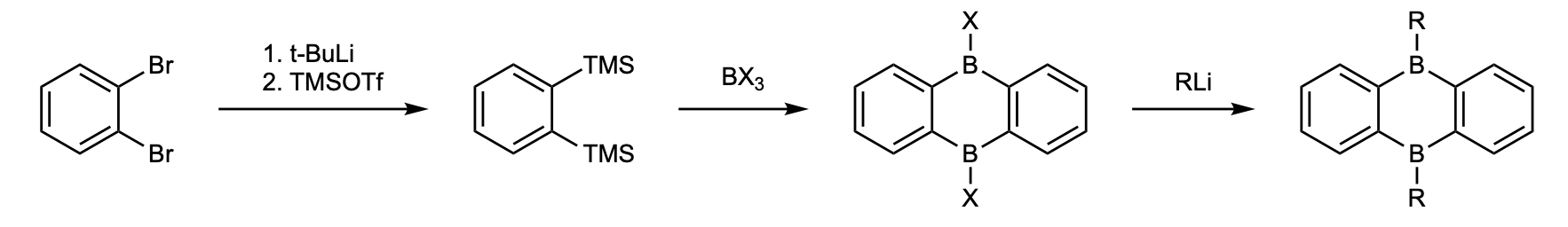
Figure 2. Synthesis of DBA.

A one-pot, generalized synthesis of boron-doped PAHs, including many of the DBA derivatives, was reported by John et al. in 2017. Starting with the more electron-poor 4,5-dichloro-1,2-bis(trimethylsilyl)benzene as the substrate, treatment with excess lewis acid BBr_{3} affords the diborylbenzene intermediate, which electrophilically attacks the parent PAH, resulting in boron-doped PAHs with a variety of functionalization patterns and properties.

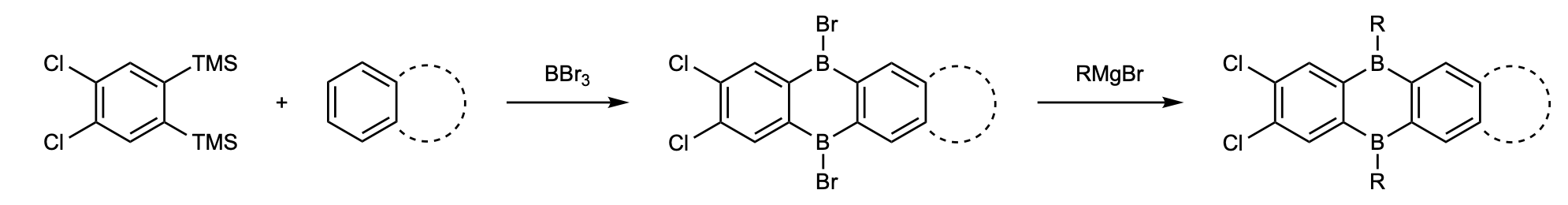
Figure 3. Generalized synthesis of boron-doped PAHs.

=== Synthesis of polymeric DBA and DBA dianion ===
The polymeric DBA can be easily accessed by subjecting 9,10-dibromo-DBA to excess neat triethylsilane. X-ray crystal structures reveal that two adjacent monomers are connected via three-center two-electron (3c-2e) B-H-B bonds. Depolymerization can be easily achieved by treating with a lewis base to form soluble monomeric lewis acid–lewis base (LA-LB) diadducts. The direct lithium metal reduction of either the polymeric DBA or its monomeric LA-LB diadducts affords the DBA dianion (DBA^{2-}), which shows distinctive catalytic activities.

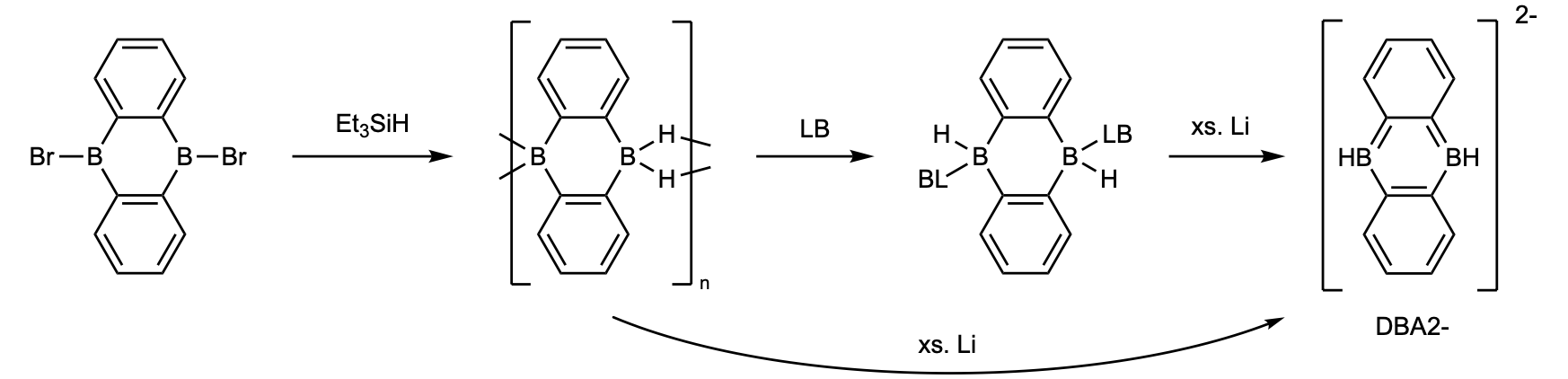
Figure 4. Synthesis of polymeric DBA and DBA dianion.

== Reactivity ==
=== Diels-Alder reactions ===
DBA can reversibly accept two electrons to form a doubly reduced dianion (DBA^{2-}). The initial investigation of the catalytic activity of DBA dianions was reported by Lorbach et al. Due to the delocalization of these extra electrons in the aromatic system, the DBA dianion is formally isoelectronic with anthracene and should be able to react with dienes in a [4+2] fashion (Diels-Alder reaction). Subjecting the DBA dianion to 4,4'-dimethylbenzophenone affords the expected [4+2] cycloaddition products, with a C-O bridge originating from the carbonyl. However, subjecting the DBA dianion to 3,3-dimethyl-1-butyne does not lead to a [4+2] cycloaddition product, but rather a C(sp)-H activation product.

=== Carbon dioxide activation ===
In a similar fashion, the DBA dianion is also capable of activating carbon dioxide. Since the DBA dianion is isoelectronic with anthracene, the first step involves the formal [4+2] cycloaddition, which resembles the reaction with benzophenone. After the formation of the C-O-bridged intermediate, it was proposed that the heterolytic cleavage of the longer B-O bond allows the formation of a transient B-O frustrated lewis pair, which activates the C=O double bond in the second carbon dioxide, leading to the formation of a more extensive C-O-C-O-bridged intermediate. Carbon monoxide is then eliminated from this intermediate quickly, and the remaining O-C-O bridge can also be eliminated to give a metal carbonate.

=== Dihydrogen activation ===
Dihydrogen activation is a common theme in transition metal chemistry. The most prominent example is the Wilkinson catalyst (RhCl(PPh_{3})_{3}), which oxidatively adds dihydrogen for the hydrogenation of olefins. It is well established that the cleavage of dihydrogen results from the synergistic donation of H_{2} σ-MO electrons to the metal's vacant d orbitals, as well as the back-donation of electrons from the metal's filled d orbitals to the H_{2} σ*-MO. Frustrated lewis pair (FLP) compounds can also cleave dihydrogen in a conceptually similar manner, where the lewis acidic atom provides an acceptor orbital, and the lewis basic atom provides a filled orbital for back-donation. DBA can reversibly accept two electrons to form a doubly reduced dianion (DBA^{2-}) which acts as a main-group ambiphile. It formally includes one boron (I) atom with a lone pair acting as a lewis basic center and one boron (III) atom with an empty p orbital acting as a lewis acidic center. Therefore, FLP-like reactivity of DBA^{2-} for dihydrogen activation could be envisaged. However, since the two extra electrons are delocalized over the entire aromatic system, transition metal-like reactivity of dihydrogen could also be operative.

In the seminal report by Grotthuss et al., it was demonstrated that certain DBA dianions are able to homolytically cleave the H-H bond, resulting in the formation of hydridoborates under mild conditions (T< 100 °C, p<1 atm). This cleavage can be either reversible or irreversible, depending on the substituents on the DBA dianion, and the reaction rate is strongly influenced by the coordinating capability of the counter-cation. Computational results suggest that the addition of dihydrogen is a concerted process.

=== Chalcogen-chalcogen bond activation ===
Chalcogen-chalcogen bond activation by the DBA dianion is a more complicated process. Different intermediates may be involved, and different products are formed depending on the identity and structure of the chalcogen substrates. The typical DBA dianion can cleave different chalcogen-chalcogen bonds to furnish the syn-diadduct, the bridged monoadduct, and the terminal monoadduct. It was also demonstrated that cyclic alkyl(amino) carbene (CAAC)-stabilized biradicaloid DBA can react with dioxygen, sulfur, and selenium to afford the respective endoperoxo- or sulfur/selenium-bridged bicyclic species.

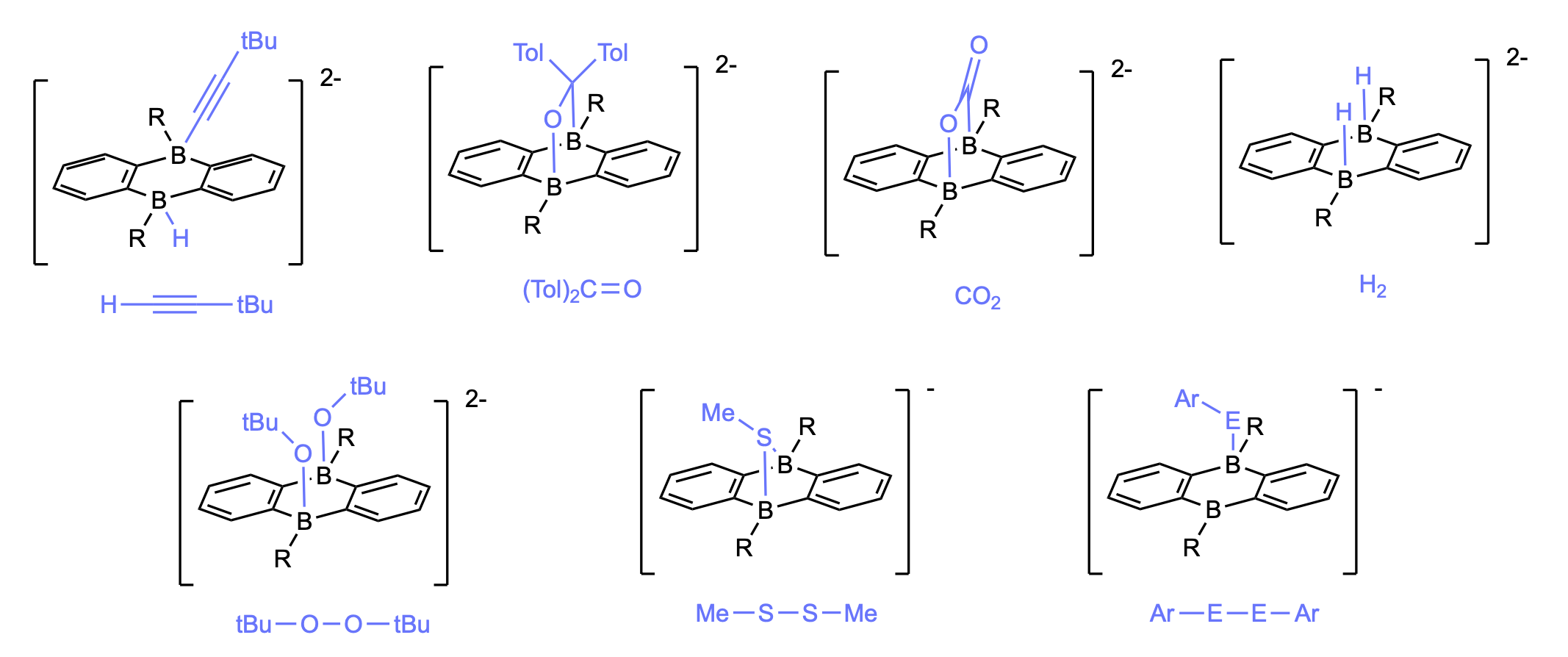
Figure 5. Selected bond activations by DBA^{2-}.

=== Dinitrogen activation ===
While the DBA dianion was not shown to activate dinitrogen alone, it was demonstrated by Xu et al. that a combination of DBA with Sm(II) samarocene can coordinatively bind to and reduce dinitrogen. Although the detailed mechanism remains elusive, it was shown that this is potentially a stepwise process. Even though the resulting nitrogen-containing heterocycle is not readily cleaved from the product, it still shows the potential to utilize boron ambiphiles to activate dinitrogen and other inert chemical bonds.

=== Catalyzing inverse electron-demand Diels-Alder (IEDDA) reactions ===
The prototypical DBA is a bidentate Lewis acid due to the incorporation of boron atoms with empty p orbitals. It catalyzes the IEDDA reaction with 1,2-diazines as the electron-poor dienes. Two Lewis acidic boron centers can form LA-LB adducts with two vicinal nitrogen atoms, withdraw electron density from the diazine, and, in principle, lower its LUMO energy to accelerate the reaction. Studies by Kessler et al. demonstrated that 9,10-dimethyl-9,10-diboraanthracene catalyzes the IEDDA reaction between a variety of 1,2-diazines and electron-rich dienophiles, resulting in moderate to good yields. This catalytic paradigm has potential applications in a variety of hetero-Diels-Alder reactions with non-activated dienes.

== Photophysical properties ==
=== General principles ===
Boron has become a particularly valuable dopant in traditional carbon-based organic materials, enhancing optoelectronic properties and enabling wider applications. The incorporation of boron atoms maintains the conjugative structure of the material while introducing novel redox phenomena. DBA is a particularly privileged building block for the construction of luminescent conjugated polymers because: 1) the monomeric DAH itself is an extended conjugated system, 2) the geometry of the monomeric DAH ensures maximal π-orbital overlap between boron atoms and aromatic rings, and 3) the cyclic structure provides extra stability compared to fully or partially open-chain structures. Some DBA derivatives have low-energy LUMOs and narrow HOMO-LUMO energy gaps, making them promising electron-transporting materials as well. Based on the computational work done by Hoffend et al., DBA^{2-} has a significantly smaller HOMO–LUMO gap compared to anthracene and other carbon-based aromatic compounds. Substitutions with mesityl groups (Mes) on borons further lowers the gap energy. The aryl groups and the boron centers in DBA can be readily functionalized for systematic study of structure-property relationships.

	E_{HOMO} (a.u.)	E_{LUMO} (a.u.)	ΔE_{gap} (eV)
Benzene	-0.227	-0.039	5.130
Naphthalene	-0.197	-0.071	3.419
Anthracene	-0.179	-0.092	2.357
DBA^{2-}	+0.176	+0.222	1.265
DBA(Mes_{2})^{2-}	+0.134	+0.169	0.959

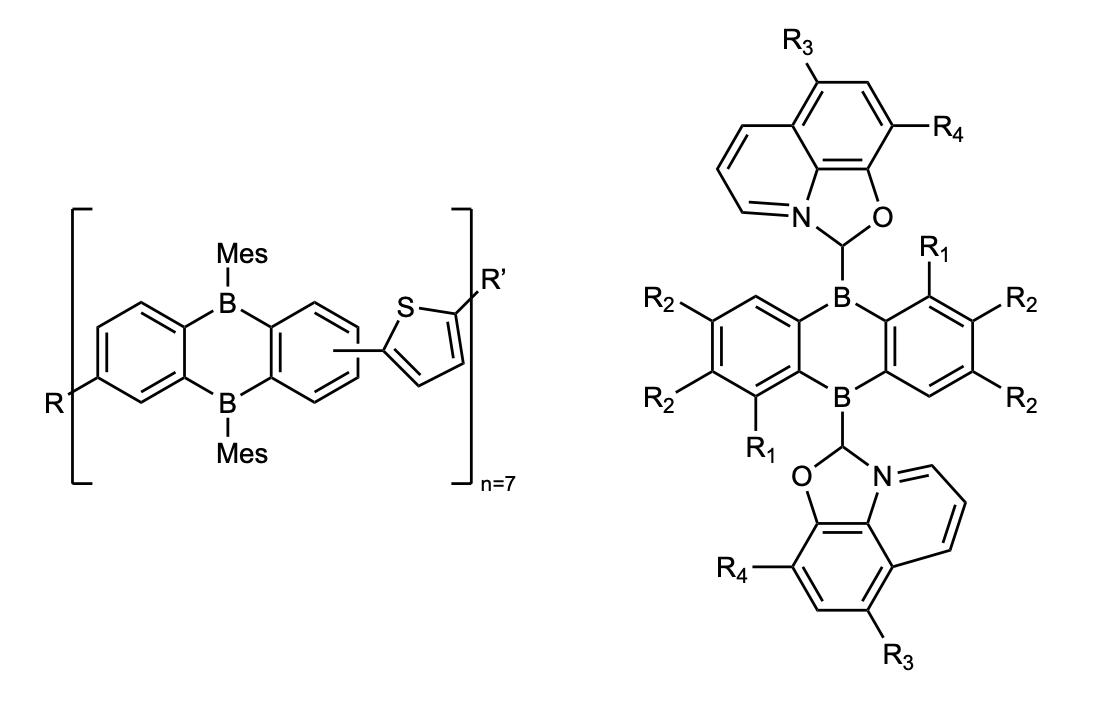
Figure 6. Selected examples of DBA-based optoelectronic polymers.

In one example from Reus et al., a bench-stable fluorescent copolymer consisting of DBA as the acceptor and thiophene as the donor was prepared and characterized. Without the addition of a capping monomer, up to 7 repeating units can be connected to achieve the maximum effective conjugation length. This oligomer exhibits dark orange fluorescence both in solution, with a quantum yield of 47%, and as a thin film, with a quantum yield of 13%. In another example from Durka et al., a series of DBA derivatives with 8-oxyquinolinato (Q) ligands were synthesized, and they were shown to be very efficient green emitters in solution, with wavelengths ranging from 499 to 503 nm and quantum yields of up to 63%. It was proposed that the two chromophores (Q ligands) could potentially interact with each other via intramolecular C-H-O hydrogen bonding. Constructing ligand-to-ligand linkages to stabilize the nonplanar structure may further help tune the optoelectronic properties.

=== Substituents effects ===
One study by Brend'amour et al. demonstrated that the halogen substitution patterns on the aryl rings of DBA have a prominent effect on the optoelectronic properties of the material. It was shown that Br substituents lower the LUMO energy of DBA to the greatest extent, with the general trend of F < Cl < Br. More substitutions generally lead to lower LUMO levels and smaller HOMO-LUMO gaps. The most bathochromic UV/Vis absorption and fluorescence emission of these DBA derivatives arise from the intramolecular charge transfer transition between the Mes rings and the DBA core. Moreover, the electron affinity of octafluoro-DBA is close to that of the commercial phenyl-C_{61}-butyric acid methyl ester, suggesting potential applications in electron-harvesting materials. Fluoro substitutions also affects the π-π interaction between aromatic layers by introducing electrostatic bias.

=== Longitudinal and lateral expansions ===
DBA and its derivatives can also be expanded longitudinally and laterally, leading to tunable optoelectronic properties based on their size and structural elements. In one example from Jovaišaitė et al., two laterally expanded DBA derivatives, using acenaphthylene and phenanthrene respectively, were shown to be excellent organic afterglow (ultralong room temperature phosphorescence) materials for red and blue-green light emission. For the red emitter and blue-green emitter, respectively, the quantum yield reaches up to 3% and 15%, with afterglow lifetimes up to 0.8 s and 3.2 s, and afterglow durations up to 5 s and 25 s. Introducing different lateral substitutions and/or stronger donor groups may allow further fine-tuning of the afterglow properties.

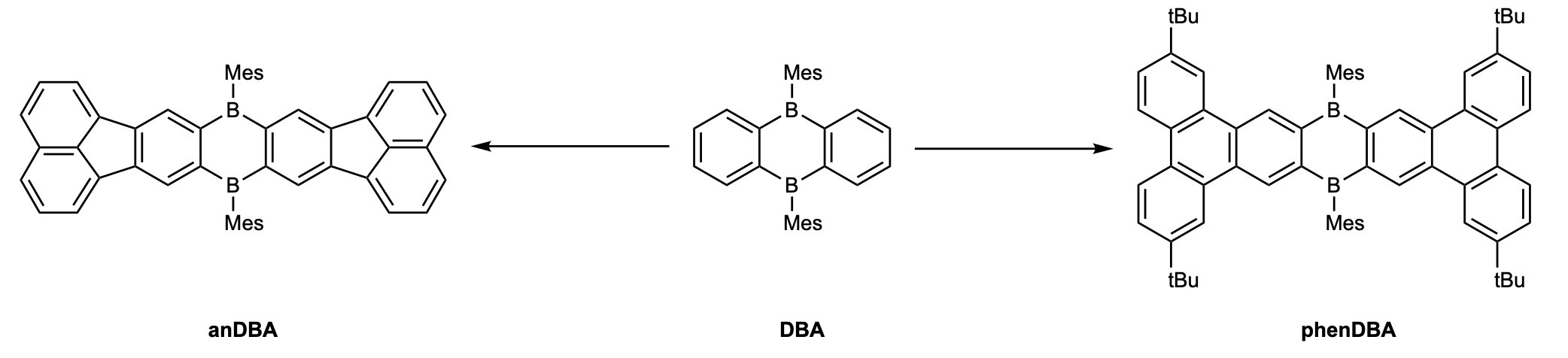
Figure 7. Lateral expansions of DBA.
