= C15H12O =

The molecular formula C_{15}H_{12}O (molar mass: 208.26 g/mol, exact mass: 208.0888 u) may refer to:

- Chalcone
- 9-Anthracenemethanol
