= Anthracene-9,10-dithiol =

- Skeletal formula

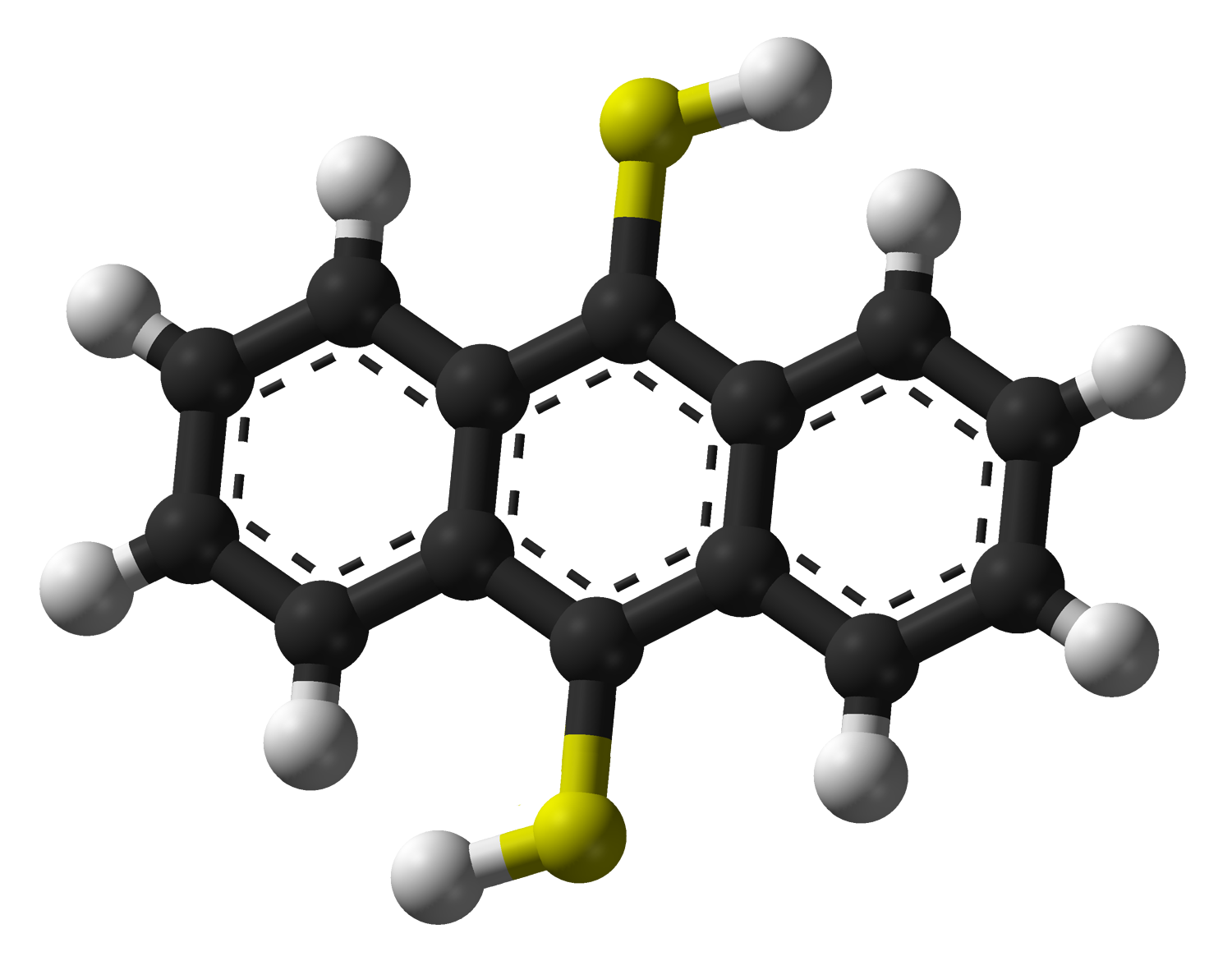
- Ball-and-stick model

Names
- Preferred IUPAC name Anthracene-9,10-dithiol

Identifiers
CAS Number	86756-29-8
3D model (JSmol)	Interactive image
ChemSpider	742334
PubChem CID	849498
UNII	33VPM79CLP
CompTox Dashboard (EPA)	DTXSID10357294
- InChI: InChI=1S/C14H10S2/c15-13-9-5-1-2-6-10(9)14(16)12-8-4-3-7-11(12)13/h1-8,15-16H Key: QHWTVIYSEHVEKU-UHFFFAOYSA-N
- SMILES: SC1=C2C(C=CC=C2)=C(S)C3=CC=CC=C31

Properties
Chemical formula	C_{14}H_{10}S_{2}
Molar mass	242.35 g·mol^{−1}
- Except where otherwise noted, data are given for materials in their standard state (at 25 °C [77 °F], 100 kPa). verify (what is ?) Infobox references

Anthracene-9,10-dithiol is an organosulfur compound with the formula C_{14}H_{8}(SH)_{2}. It is one of several isomer of anthracene with two thiol groups.

In 2004, DTA molecules were demonstrated to be able to "walk" in a straight line (reportedly a first) on a metal surface by, in effect, mimicking the bipedal motion of a human being. The sulfur-bearing functional groups on either side (referred to as "linkers") serve as the molecule's "feet". When the compound is heated on a flat copper surface, the linkers raise up, alternating from side to side, and propel the molecule forward.

During testing at UC Riverside's Center for Nanoscale Science and Engineering, the molecule took about 10,000 unassisted nano-scale steps, moving in a straight line without requiring the assistance of nano-rails or nano-grooves for guidance. As described by one of the researchers, "Similar to a human walking, where one foot is kept on the ground while the other moves forward and propels the body, our molecule always has one linker on a flat surface, which prevents the molecule from stumbling to the side or veering off course." Researchers believe the project could lead to the development of molecular computers in which DTA or other similar molecules would function as nano-abacuses.
