= C15H10O =

The molecular formula C_{15}H_{10}O (molar mass: 206.239 g/mol, exact mass: 206.0732 u) may refer to:

- Anthracene-9-carbaldehyde
- Diphenylcyclopropenone (diphencyprone)
