= 9-Anthracenemethanol =

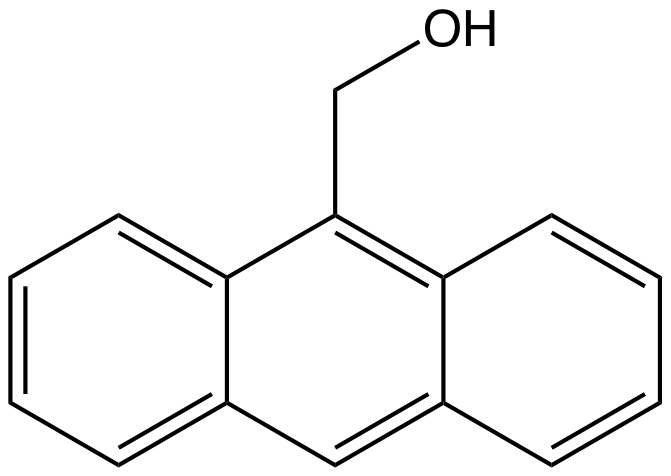

Names
- Preferred IUPAC name (Anthracen-9-yl)methanol

Identifiers
CAS Number	1468-95-7
3D model (JSmol)	Interactive image
ChEMBL	ChEMBL3188668
ChemSpider	66482
ECHA InfoCard	100.014.544
EC Number	215-998-5
PubChem CID	73848
UNII	2N7UVX2HLM
CompTox Dashboard (EPA)	DTXSID1049221
- InChI: InChI=1S/C15H12O/c16-10-15-13-7-3-1-5-11(13)9-12-6-2-4-8-14(12)15/h1-9,16H,10H2 Key: JCJNNHDZTLRSGN-UHFFFAOYSA-N
- SMILES: C1=CC=C2C(=C1)C=C3C=CC=CC3=C2CO

Properties
Chemical formula	C_{15}H_{12}O
Molar mass	208.260 g·mol^{−1}
Appearance	white solid
Melting point	158 °C (316 °F; 431 K)

Hazards
- GHS labelling
Pictograms	(GHS08: Health hazard)
Signal word	Warning
Hazard statements	H341
Precautionary statements	P201, P202, P281, P308+P313, P405, P501
- Except where otherwise noted, data are given for materials in their standard state (at 25 °C [77 °F], 100 kPa). Infobox references

9-Anthracenemethanol is the derivative of anthracene with a hydroxymethyl group (CH_{2}OH) attached to the 9-position. It is a colorless solid that is soluble in ordinary organic solvents. The compound can be prepared by hydrogenation of 9-anthracenecarboxaldehyde. It is a versatile precursor to supramolecular assemblies.
