= Anthracene-9-carbaldehyde =

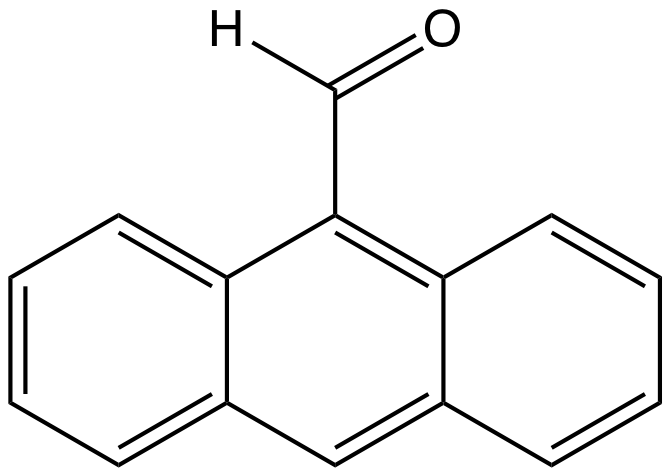

Names
- Preferred IUPAC name Anthracene-9-carbaldehyde
- Other names 9-Anthraldehyde, 9-Anthracenaldehyde, Anthracene-9-carbaldehyde

Identifiers
CAS Number	642-31-9
3D model (JSmol)	Interactive image
Beilstein Reference	639167
ChemSpider	62710
ECHA InfoCard	100.010.349
EC Number	211-383-0
PubChem CID	69504
UNII	353S277YHY
CompTox Dashboard (EPA)	DTXSID9060940
- InChI: InChI=1S/C15H10O/c16-10-15-13-7-3-1-5-11(13)9-12-6-2-4-8-14(12)15/h1-10H Key: YMNKUHIVVMFOFO-UHFFFAOYSA-N
- SMILES: C1=CC=C2C(=C1)C=C3C=CC=CC3=C2C=O

Properties
Chemical formula	C_{15}H_{10}O
Molar mass	206.244 g·mol^{−1}
Appearance	yellow solid
Melting point	104 °C (219 °F; 377 K)

Hazards
- GHS labelling
Pictograms	(GHS08: Health hazard)
Signal word	Warning
Hazard statements	H302, H312, H315, H319, H332, H335
Precautionary statements	P261, P264, P270, P271, P280, P301+P312, P302+P352, P304+P312, P304+P340, P305+P351+P338, P312, P321, P322, P330, P332+P313, P337+P313, P362, P363, P403+P233, P405, P501
- Except where otherwise noted, data are given for materials in their standard state (at 25 °C [77 °F], 100 kPa). Infobox references

Anthracene-9-carbaldehyde is the most common monoaldehyde derivative of anthracene. It is a yellow solid that is soluble in common organic solvents. It is prepared by Vilsmeier formylation of anthracene. The compound is also used as a building block for supramolecular assemblies. Hydrogenation of 9-anthracenecarboxaldehyde gives 9-anthracenemethanol.
