= Anthracene =

- Skeletal formula and numbering system of anthracene

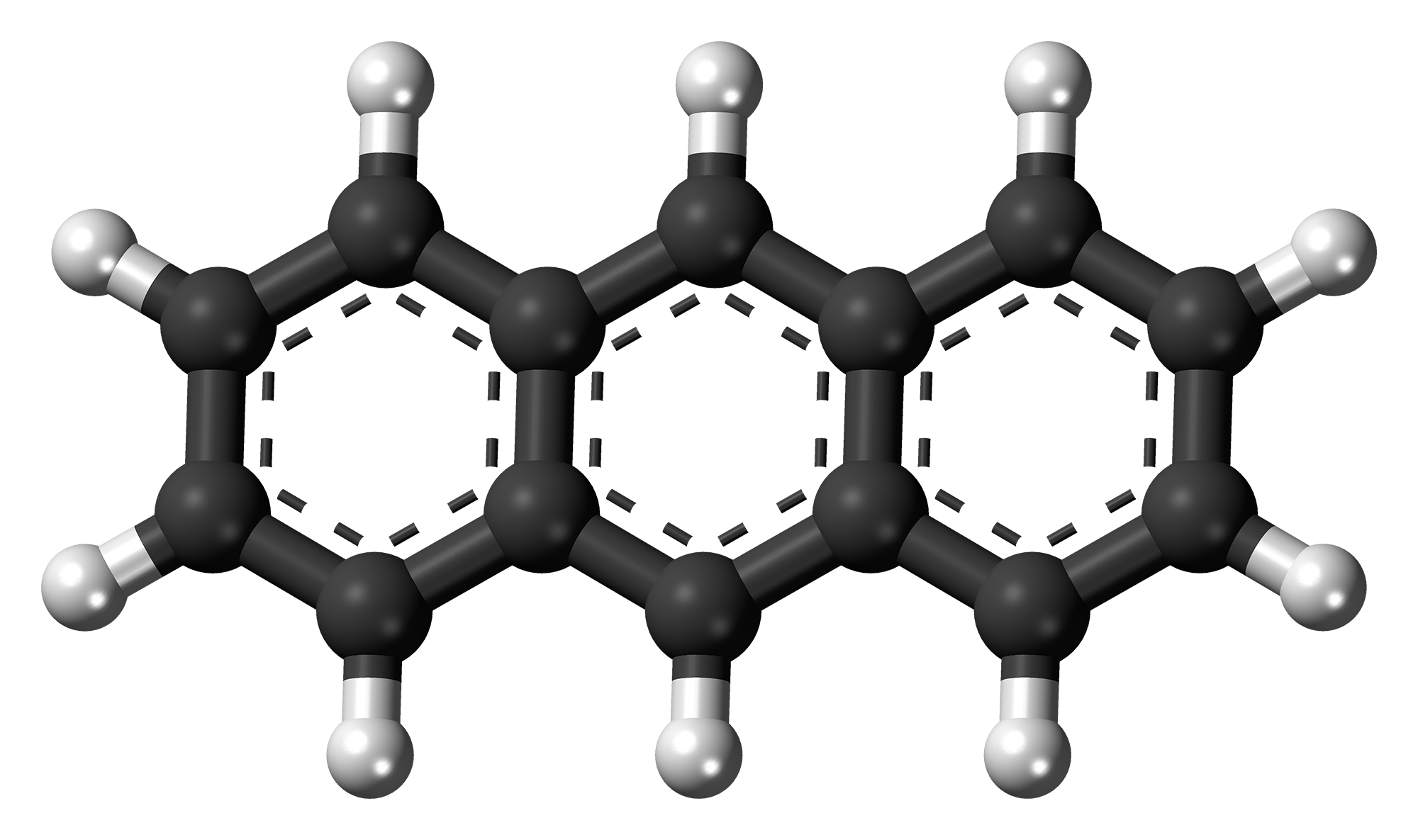

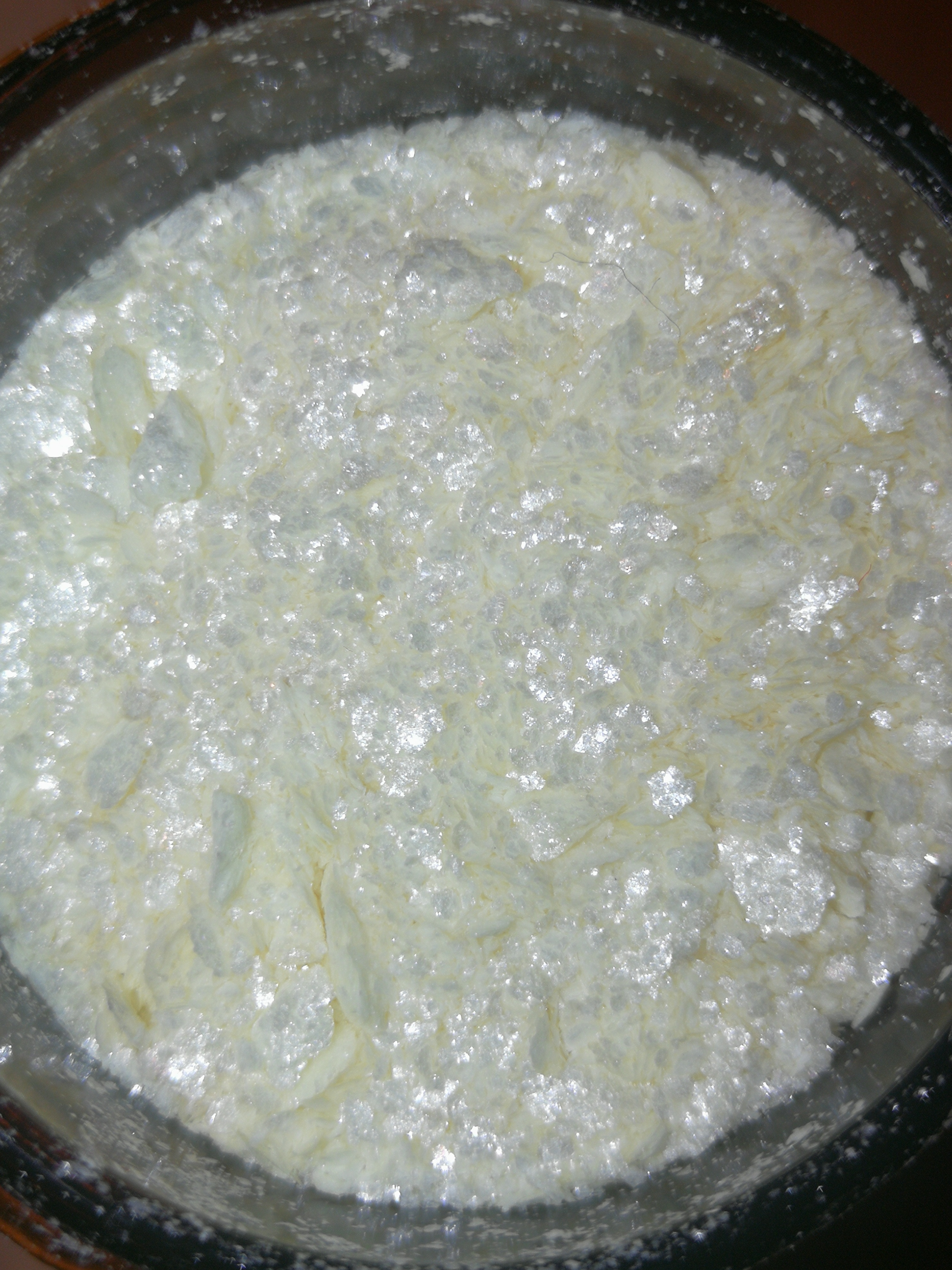
- Anthracene

Names
- IUPAC name Anthracene

Identifiers
| CAS Number | 120-12-7 |
| 3D model (JSmol) | Interactive image |
| Beilstein Reference | 1905429 |
| ChEBI | CHEBI:35298 |
| ChEMBL | ChEMBL333179 |
| ChemSpider | 8111 |
| DrugBank | DB07372 |
| ECHA InfoCard | 100.003.974 |
| EC Number | 217-004-5 |
| Gmelin Reference | 67837 |
| KEGG | C14315 |
| PubChem CID | 8418 |
| RTECS number | CA9350000 |
| UNII | EH46A1TLD7 |
| UN number | 3077 |
| CompTox Dashboard (EPA) | DTXSID0023878 |
- InChI: InChI=1S/C14H10/c1-2-6-12-10-14-8-4-3-7-13(14)9-11(12)5-1/h1-10H Key: MWPLVEDNUUSJAV-UHFFFAOYSA-N; InChI=1/C14H10/c1-2-6-12-10-14-8-4-3-7-13(14)9-11(12)5-1/h1-10H Key: MWPLVEDNUUSJAV-UHFFFAOYAK
- SMILES: c1ccc2cc3ccccc3cc2c1

Properties
| Chemical formula | C_{14}H_{10} |
| Molar mass | 178.234 g·mol^{−1} |
| Appearance | Colorless |
| Odor | Weak aromatic |
| Density | 1.28 g/cm^{3} |
| Melting point | 216 ± 2 °C (421 ± 4 °F; 489 ± 2 K) |
| Boiling point | 341.3 ± 0.4 °C (646.3 ± 0.7 °F; 614.5 ± 0.4 K) |
| Solubility in water | Insoluble (2.2 μg/100 g) |
| Solubility in pressurized hot water | 0.0101 % mass (150 °C (302 °F), 50 bar); 0.49 % mass (250 °C (482 °F), 50 bar); 3.62 % mass (300 °C (572 °F), 100 bar) |
| Solubility in benzene | 1.86 g/100 g |
| Solubility in carbon disulphide | 2.58 g/100 g |
| Solubility in diethyl ether | 1.42 g/100 g |
| Solubility in ethanol | 0.328 g/100 g |
| Solubility in toluene | 0.92 g/100 g (16.5 °C (61.7 °F)); 12.94 g/100 g (100 °C (212 °F)) |
| log P | 4.56 |
| Vapor pressure | 1 Pa (89.2 °C (192.6 °F), subl.); 100 Pa (151.5 °C (304.7 °F), subl.); 1 kPa (165 °C (329 °F), subl.); 10 kPa (238.8 °C (461.8 °F)); 100 kPa (340.2 °C (644.4 °F)) |
| Henry's law constant (k_{H}) | 0.00396 (kPa·m^{3})/mol |
| Electrical resistivity | 1.5×10^{11} Ω·cm |
| UV-vis (λ_{max}) | 252 nm, 375 nm |
| Band gap | 2.50 eV |
| Electron mobility | 2.3 cm^{2}/(V·s) |
| Magnetic susceptibility (χ) | 129.8×10^{−6} cm^{3}/mol |

Structure (290 K)
| Crystal structure | Monoclinic |
| Space group | P2_{1}/b |
| Point group | C_{2h} |
| Lattice constant | a = 8.562 Å, b = 6.038 Å, c = 11.184 Å α = 90°, β = 124.7°, γ = 90° |
| Formula units (Z) | 2 |

Structure (metastable from vapor growth)
| Crystal structure | Monoclinic |
| Space group | P2_{1}/n |
| Lattice constant | a = 8.553 Å, b = 6.021 Å, c = 22.334 Å α = 90°, β = 124.54°, γ = 90° |
| Formula units (Z) | 4 |

Thermochemistry
| Heat capacity (C) | 210.5 J⋅mol^{−1}⋅K^{−1} |
| Std molar entropy (S^{⦵}_{298}) | 207.5 J⋅mol^{−1}⋅K^{−1} |
| Std enthalpy of formation (Δ_{f}H^{⦵}_{298}) | 129.2 kJ⋅mol^{−1} (solid); 230.9 kJ⋅mol^{−1} (gas) |
| Std enthalpy of combustion (Δ_{c}H^{⦵}_{298}) | 7068 kJ⋅mol^{−1} |
| Enthalpy of fusion (Δ_{f}H^{⦵}_{fus}) | 29.4 kJ⋅mol^{−1} |

Hazards
- GHS labelling
| Pictograms | (GHS09: Environmental hazard) |
| Signal word | Warning |
| Hazard statements | H410 |
| Precautionary statements | P273, P391, P501 |
| NFPA 704 (fire diamond) | 2 1 1 |
| Flash point | 121 °C (250 °F; 394 K) |
| Autoignition temperature | 540 °C (1,004 °F; 813 K) |
| Explosive limits | >0.6% |
- Lethal dose or concentration (LD, LC)
| LD_{50} (median dose) | 4900 mg/kg (rat, oral); >1320 mg/kg (rat, dermal) |
- NIOSH (US health exposure limits)
| PEL (Permissible) | 0.2 mg/m^{3} (TWA) |
| REL (Recommended) | 0.1 mg/m^{3} (TWA) |
- Except where otherwise noted, data are given for materials in their standard state (at 25 °C [77 °F], 100 kPa). verify (what is ?) Infobox references

Anthracene is a solid polycyclic aromatic hydrocarbon (PAH) of formula C_{14}H_{10}, consisting of three fused benzene rings. It is a component of coal tar. Anthracene is used as a precursor in the production of anthraquinone and its derivatives such as the red dye alizarin, and as a scintillator to detect high energy particles. Anthracene is colorless but exhibits a blue (400–500 nm peak) fluorescence under ultraviolet radiation.

== History and etymology ==
Crude anthracene (with a melting point of only 180°) was discovered in 1832 by Jean-Baptiste Dumas and Auguste Laurent who crystalized it from a fraction of coal tar later known as "anthracene oil". Since their (inaccurate) measurements showed the proportions of carbon and hydrogen of it to be the same as in naphthalene, Laurent called it paranaphtaline in his 1835 publication of the discovery, which is translated to English as paranaphthalene. Two years later, however, he decided to rename the compound to its modern name derived from Ancient Greek: ἄνθραξ, romanized: anthrax, lit. 'coal' because after discovering other polyaromatic hydrocarbons he decided it was only one of isomers of naphthalene. This notion was disproved in 1850s and 1860s.

== Occurrence and production ==
Anthracene, as many other polycyclic aromatic hydrocarbons, is generated during combustion processes. Most human exposure is through tobacco smoke or ingestion of charred food.

The mineral form of anthracene is called freitalite and is related to a coal deposit. Coal tar, which contains around 1.5% anthracene, remains a major industrial source of this material. Common impurities are phenanthrene and carbazole.

A classic laboratory method for the preparation of anthracene is by cyclodehydration of o-methyl- or o-methylene-substituted diarylketones in the so-called Elbs reaction, for example from o-tolyl phenyl ketone.

== Reactions ==
=== Reduction ===
Reduction of anthracene with alkali metals yields the deeply colored radical anion salts M^{+}[anthracene]^{−} (M = Li, Na, K). Reduction with sodium in ethanol gives 9,10-dihydroanthracene, preserving the aromaticity of the two flanking rings.

=== Cycloadditions ===
In any solvent except water, anthracene photodimerizes by the action of UV light:

The dimer, called dianthracene (or sometimes paranthracene), is connected by a pair of new carbon-carbon bonds, the result of the [4+4] cycloaddition. It reverts to anthracene thermally or with UV irradiation below 300 nm. Substituted anthracene derivatives behave similarly. The reaction is affected by the presence of oxygen.

Anthracene also reacts with dienophile singlet oxygen in a [4+2]-cycloaddition (Diels–Alder reaction):

Diels alder reaction of anthracene with singlet oxygen

=== With electrophiles ===
Chemical oxidation occurs readily, giving anthraquinone, C_{14}H_{8}O_{2} (below), for example using hydrogen peroxide and vanadyl acetylacetonate.

Anthraquione

Electrophilic substitution of anthracene occurs at the 9 position. For example, formylation affords 9-anthracenecarboxaldehyde. Substitution at other positions is effected indirectly, for example starting with anthroquinone. Bromination of anthracene gives 9,10-dibromoanthracene.

== Uses ==
Anthracene proper has application as an organic semiconductor and chemical feedstock for various preservatives and dyes.

=== Electronics ===
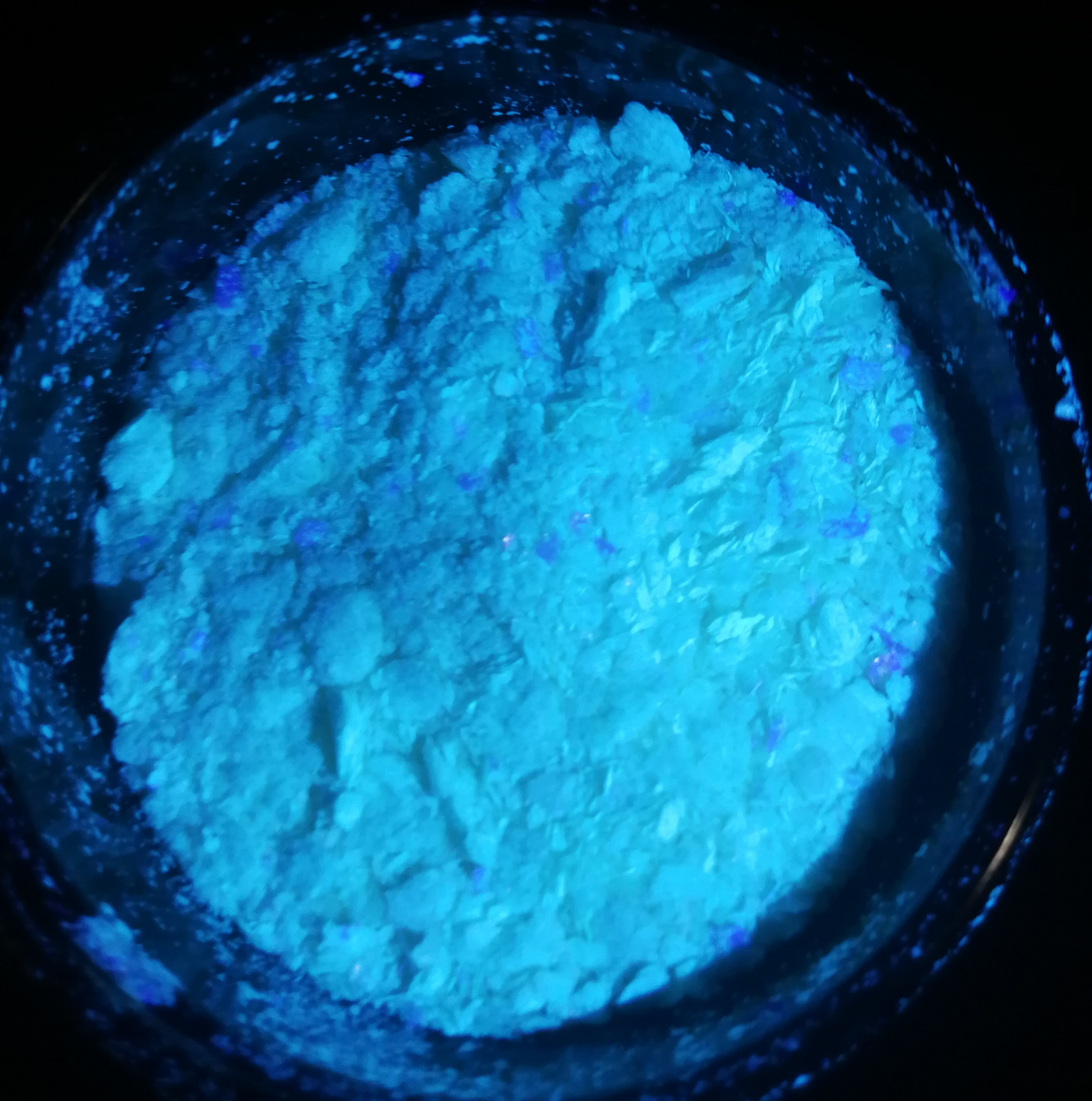
Fluorescence of anthracene under UV light

Anthracene is a wide band-gap organic semiconductor, with an emission spectrum peaking in the dark violet (400 and 440 nm). Organic field-effect transistors have been constructed from it. In particle physics, it is used as a scintillator to detect high-energy photons, electrons, or alpha particles. Plastics, such as polyvinyltoluene, can be doped with anthracene to produce an approximately water-equivalent scintillator in radiation therapy dosimetry.

Anthracene is commonly used as a UV tracer in conformal coatings applied to printed wiring boards. The anthracene tracer allows the conformal coating to be inspected under UV light.

=== Derivatives ===
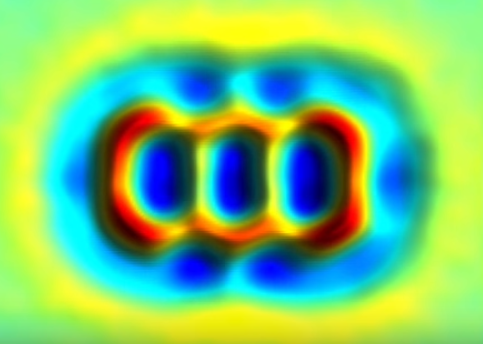
False-color AFM image of anthracene diradical, where hydrogen atoms are removed at carbons 9 and 10

A variety of anthracene derivatives find specialized uses. Industrially, anthracene is converted mainly to anthraquinone, a precursor to dyes. Derivatives having a hydroxyl group are 1-hydroxyanthracene and 2-hydroxyanthracene, homologous to phenol and naphthols, and hydroxyanthracene (also called anthrol, and anthracenol) are pharmacologically active.

Anthracene may also be found with multiple hydroxyl groups, as in 9,10-dihydroxyanthracene.

Some anthracene derivatives are used as pharmaceuticals, including the chemotherapeutic agent bisantrene, and benzoctamine.

== Toxicology ==
Many investigations indicate that anthracene is noncarcinogenic: "consistently negative findings in numerous in vitro and in vivo genotoxicity tests". Early experiments suggested otherwise because crude samples were contaminated with other polycyclic aromatic hydrocarbons. Nevertheless, the International Agency for Research on Cancer (IARC) classifies anthracene as IARC group 2B, possibly carcinogenic to humans.

Anthracene is readily biodegraded in soil. It is especially susceptible to degradation in the presence of light.

== See also ==
- 9,10-Dithioanthracene, derivative with two thiol groups added to the central ring
- Phenanthrene
- Acridine
- Phenazine
- Tetracene
