= Phenyl-C61-butyric acid methyl ester =

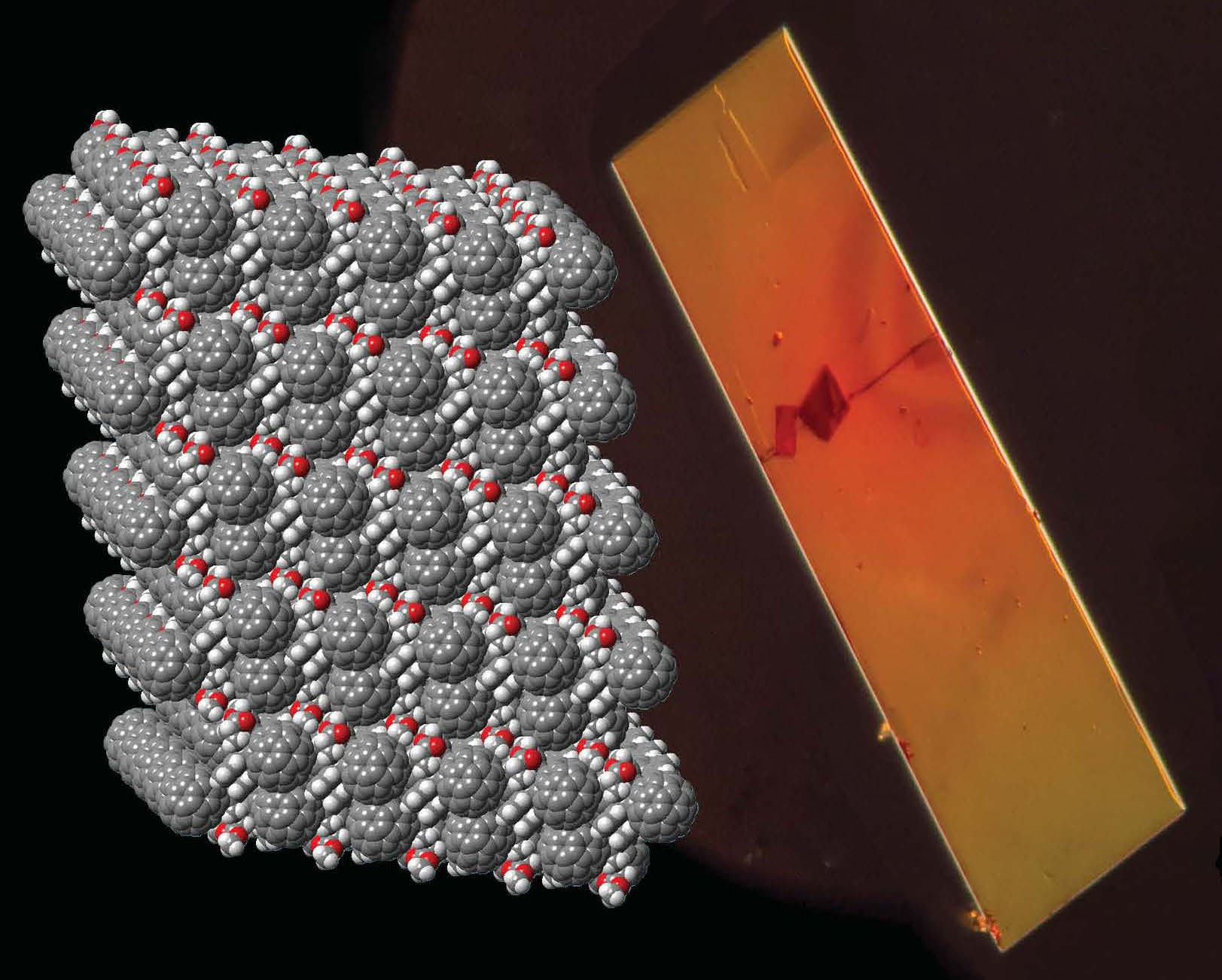
- PCBM crystal and its model. Gray: carbons, red: oxygens, white: hydrogens.

Names
- Preferred IUPAC name Methyl 4-[3′-Phenyl-3′H-cyclopropa[1,9](C_{60}-I_{h})[5,6]fulleren-3′-yl]butanoate

Identifiers
CAS Number	160848-21-5; 160848-22-6
3D model (JSmol)	Interactive image
ChemSpider	21170152
PubChem CID	53384373
CompTox Dashboard (EPA)	DTXSID80894348
- InChI: InChI=1S/C72H14O2/c1-74-11(73)8-5-9-70(10-6-3-2-4-7-10)71-66-58-50-40-30-22-14-12-13-16-20-18(14)26-34-28(20)38-32-24(16)25-17(13)21-19-15(12)23(22)31-37-27(19)35-29(21)39-33(25)43-42(32)52-46(38)56-48(34)54(44(50)36(26)30)62(66)64(56)68-60(52)61-53(43)47(39)57-49(35)55-45(37)51(41(31)40)59(58)67(71)63(55)65(57)69(61)72(68,70)71/h2-4,6-7H,5,8-9H2,1H3 Key: FIGVSQKKPIKBST-UHFFFAOYSA-N; Key: FIGVSQKKPIKBST-UHFFFAOYSA-N
- SMILES: COC(=O)CCCC1(C23C14C5=C6C7=C8C5=C9C1=C5C%10=C%11C%12=C%13C%10=C%10C1=C8C1=C%10C8=C%10C%14=C%15C%16=C%17C(=C%12C%12=C%17C%17=C%18C%16=C%16C%15=C%15C%10=C1C7=C%15C1=C%16C(=C%18C7=C2C2=C%10C(=C5C9=C42)C%11=C%12C%10=C%177)C3=C16)C%14=C%138)C1=CC=CC=C1

Properties
Chemical formula	C_{72}H_{14}O_{2}
Molar mass	910.902 g·mol^{−1}
Density	1.631 g/cm^{3} (100 K)
Melting point	280 °C (536 °F; 553 K)(sublimates)

Structure(100 K)
Crystal structure	Monoclinic
Space group	P2(1)/n
Lattice constant	a = 1.347 nm, b = 1.51 nm, c = 1.901 nm α = 90°, β = 106.9°, γ = 90°
Formula units (Z)	4

Hazards
- GHS labelling
Pictograms	(GHS07: Exclamation mark)
Signal word	Warning
Hazard statements	H319, H335
Precautionary statements	P261, P264, P271, P280, P304+P340, P305+P351+P338, P312, P337+P313, P403+P233, P405, P501
- Except where otherwise noted, data are given for materials in their standard state (at 25 °C [77 °F], 100 kPa). verify (what is ?) Infobox references

PCBM ([6,6]-phenyl-C_{61}-butyric acid methyl ester) is a fullerene derivative being investigated for its potential use in organic solar cells.

PCBM is a fullerene derivative of the C_{60} buckyball that was first synthesized in the 1990s. It is an electron acceptor material and is often used in organic solar cells (plastic solar cells) or flexible electronics in conjunction with electron donor materials such as P3HT or other conductive polymers. It is a more practical choice for an electron acceptor when compared with fullerenes because of its solubility in chlorobenzene. This allows for solution processable donor/acceptor mixes, a necessary property for "printable" solar cells. However, considering the cost of fabricating fullerenes, it is not certain that this derivative can be synthesized on a large scale for commercial applications.

== See also ==
- Organic solar cell
