= Quinta de Água halt =

Closed halt in northern Portugal

Quinta de Água halt Apeadeiro de Quinta de Água
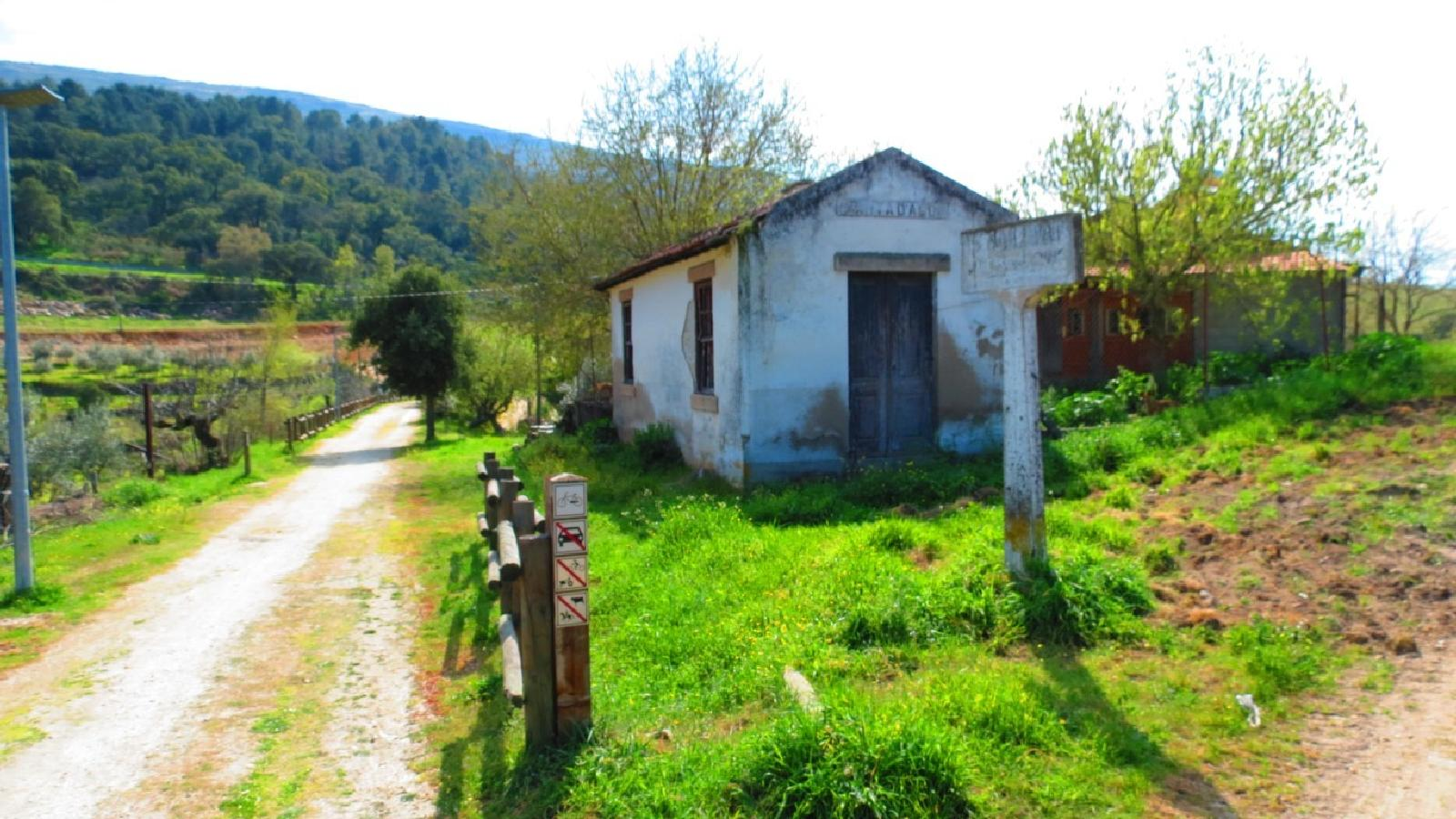
- Quinta de Água halt in 2014

General information
- Other names: Quinta d'Água halt, Quinta da Água halt
- Location: Torre de Moncorvo; Portugal
- Coordinates: 41°10′57.56″N 7°01′35.78″W
- Line: Sabor line (1911-1988)
- Distance: Pocinho - 14.8km; Mogadouro - 57.75km; Duas Igrejas - Miranda - 90.49km
- Connections: Larinho; Moncorvo

Other information
- Website: https://www.infraestruturasdeportugal.pt/negocios-e-servicos/horarios

History
- Opened: 17 September 1911
- Closed: 1 August 1988
Location
- Location within Portugal

The Quinta de Água halt (originally called Quinta D'Água) was a station on the Sabor line, which served the area of Quinta da Água, in the municipality of Torre de Moncorvo, in Portugal.

This interface was located on the section of the Sabor line between Pocinho and Carviçais, which entered service on September 17, 1911. The Sabor line closed on 1 August 1988 and consequently, so did the Quinta de Água halt.

== See also ==
- Caminhos de Ferro Portugueses
- Infraestruturas de Portugal
- Rail transport in Portugal
- History of rail transport in Portugal
