= Larinho halt =

Closed halt in northern Portugal

Larinho halt Apeadeiro de Larinho
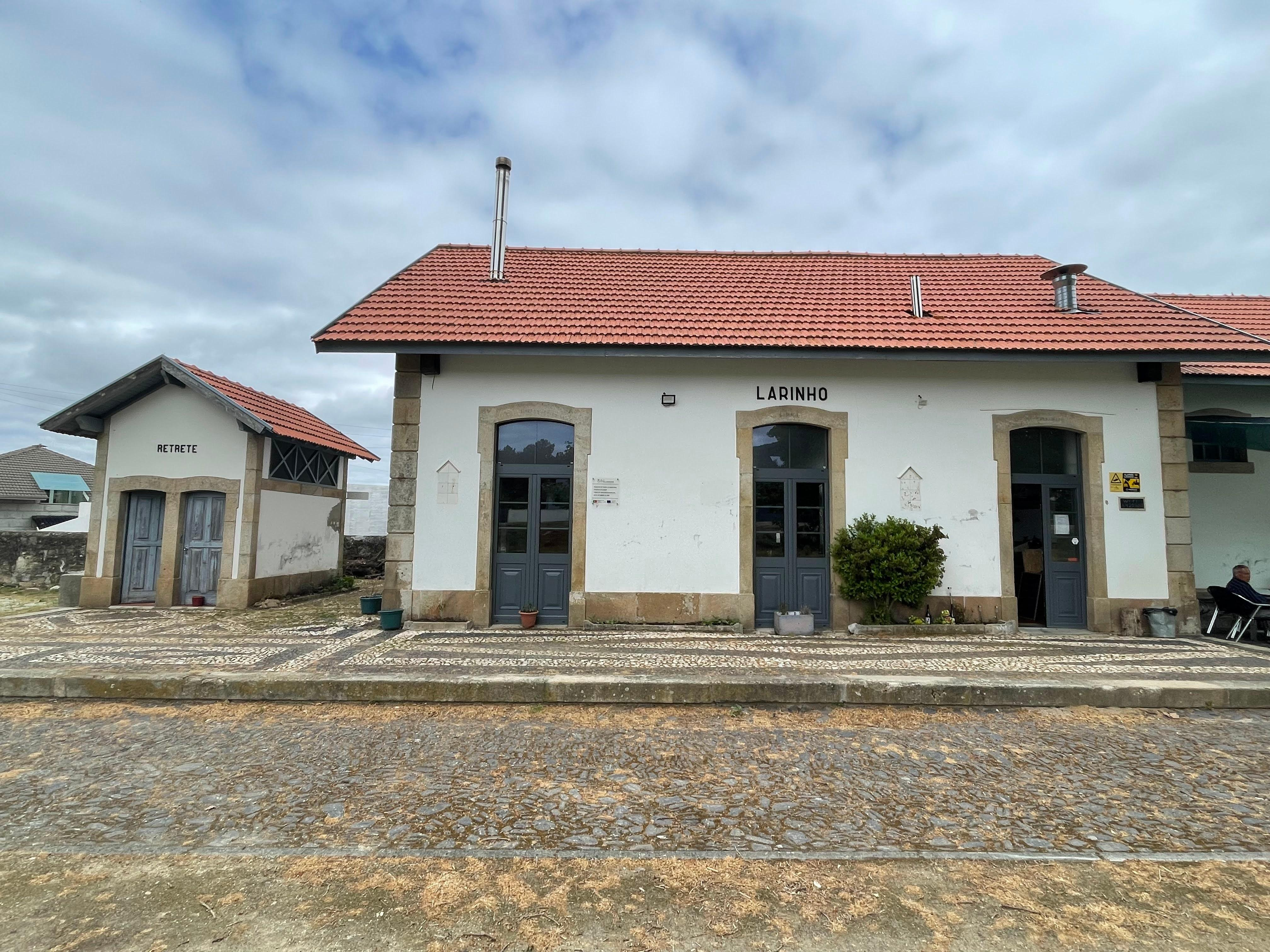
- Larinho halt in 2023

General information
- Location: Larinho, Torre de Moncorvo; Portugal
- Coordinates: 41°11′37.76″N 7°01′04.76″W
- Line: Sabor line (1911-1988)
- Distance: Pocinho - 16.5km; Mogadouro - 56.05km; Duas Igrejas - Miranda - 88.8km
- Connections: Zimbro; Quinta de Água

History
- Opened: 17 September 1911
- Closed: 1 August 1988
Location
- Location within Portugal

The Larinho halt was a station on the Sabor line that served the town of Larinho, in the municipality of Torre de Moncorvo, Portugal.

== History ==
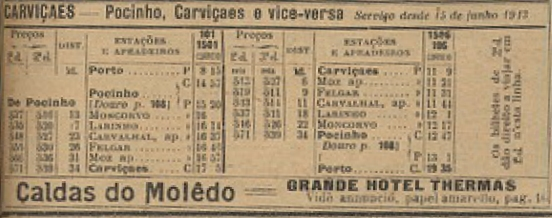
Timetable of the Sabor line in 1913, where the Larinho halt appears with the category of station

This station was part of the section of the Sabor line between Pocinho and Carviçais, which entered service on 17 September 1911. The line and the Larinho halt closed on 1 August 1988.

== See also ==
- Comboios de Portugal
- Infraestruturas de Portugal
- Rail transport in Portugal
- History of rail transport in Portugal

== Bibliography ==
- Reis, Francisco; Gomes, Rosa; Gomes, Gilberto; et al. (2006). Os Caminhos de Ferro Portugueses 1856-2006. Lisboa: CP-Comboios de Portugal e Público-Comunicação Social S. A. p. 238. ISBN 989-619-078-X.
