= Moncorvo railway station =

Closed railway station in northeast Portugal

Moncorvo railway station Estação Ferroviária de Moncorvo
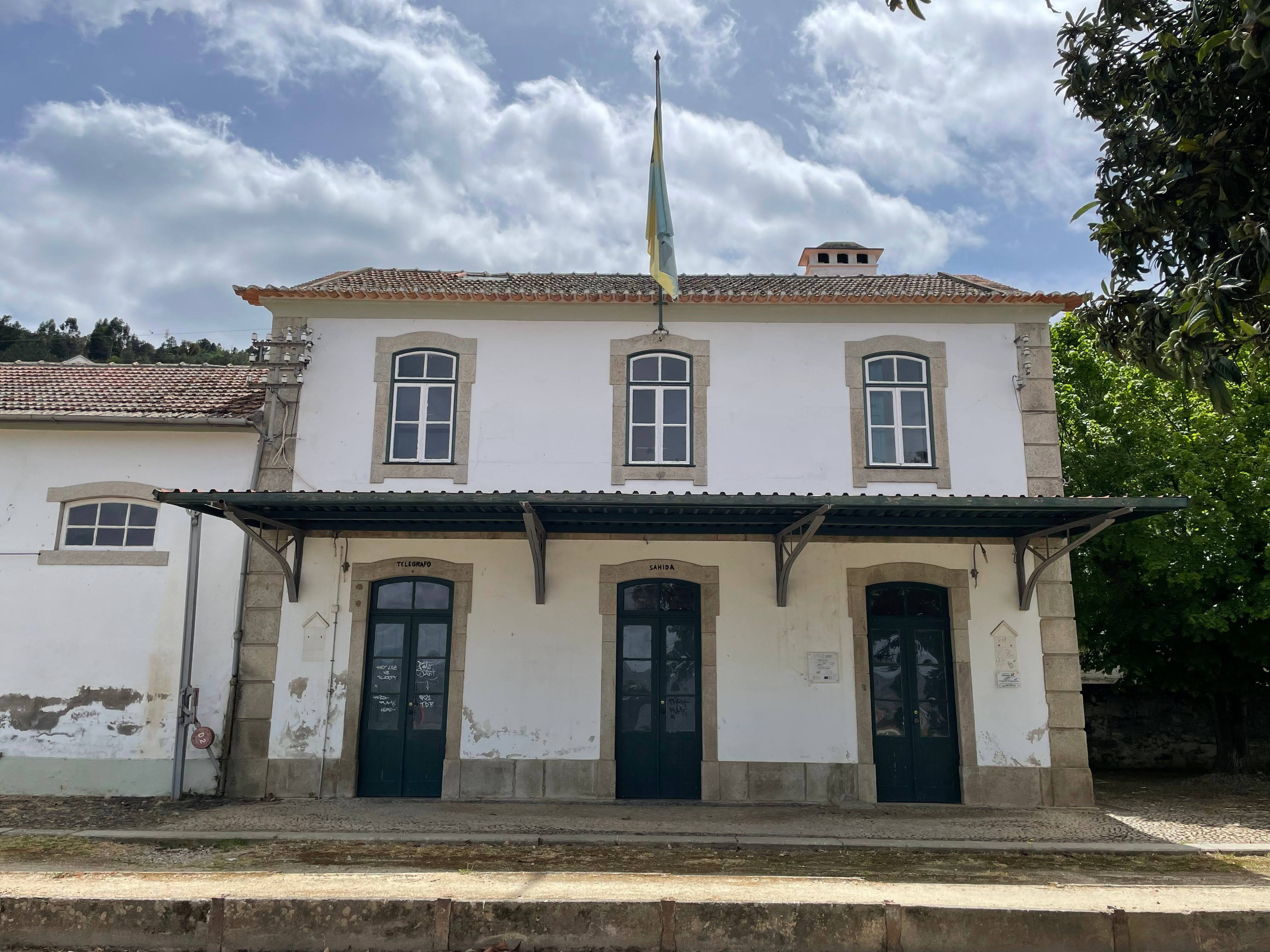
- Moncorvo railway station in April 2023

General information
- Location: Torre de Moncorvo; Portugal
- Coordinates: 41°10′20″N 7°02′58″W
- Line: Sabor line (1911–1988)
- Distance: Pocinho - 12.3km; Mogadouro - 60.2km; Duas Igrejas - Miranda - 92.9km
- Connections: Quinta de Água; Pocinho

History
- Opened: 17 September 1911; 115 years ago
- Closed: 1 August 1988
Location
- Location within Portugal

The Moncorvo railway station was a railway station on the Sabor line, serving the town of Torre de Moncorvo, in the Bragança District, Portugal.

== History ==
In 1899, engineer Cachapuz, representing a consortium of Italian financiers, requested authorisation from the Portuguese government to construct several railway lines in Portugal, including one connecting Pocinho to Moncorvo.

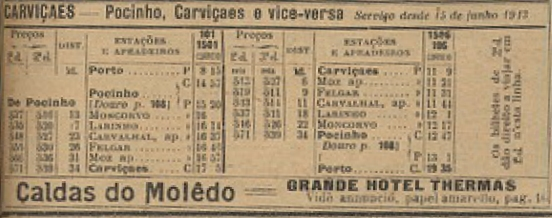
Timetable of the Sabor line in 1913, including Moncorvo station

The station was located on the section of the Sabor line between the stations of Pocinho and Carviçais, which opened to traffic on 17 September 1911.

In 1935, the Companhia Nacional de Caminhos de Ferro carried out expansion works on the station's gatekeeper's house so that it could be used as a residence for the inspector of the Traffic Department. In 1939, a residential building comprising three dwellings was constructed.

The Sabor line and the Moncorvo railway station were closed on 1 August 1988.

== See also ==
- Sabor line
- Comboios de Portugal
- Infraestruturas de Portugal
- Rail transport in Portugal
- History of rail transport in Portugal

== Bibliography ==
- Reis, Francisco; Gomes, Rosa; Gomes, Gilberto (2006). Os Caminhos de Ferro Portugueses 1856–2006. et al. Lisbon: CP – Comboios de Portugal and Público – Comunicação Social S.A. p. 238. ISBN 989-619-078-X.
