= Torre de Moncorvo =

- Municipality
- Town of Torre de Moncorvo
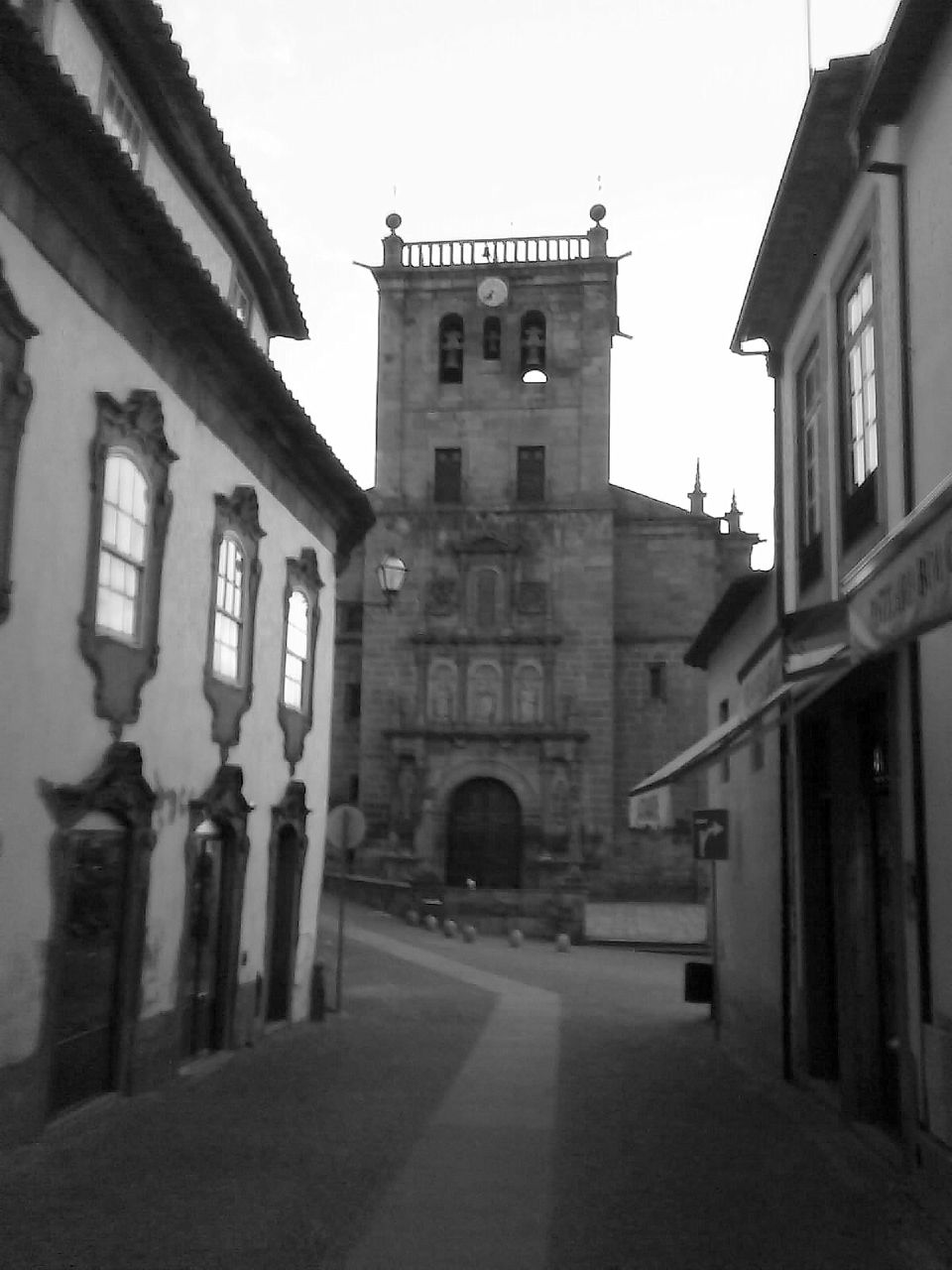
- Church of Torre de Moncorvo

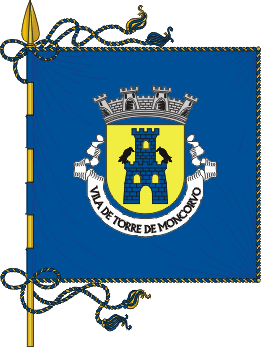
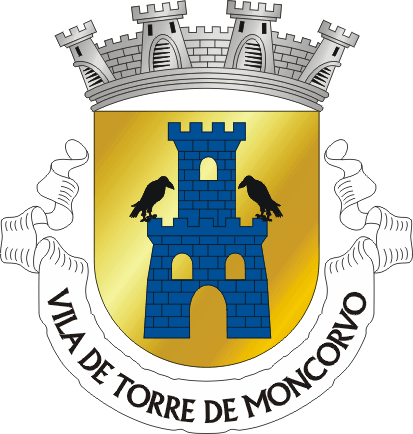
- Flag Coat of arms
- Interactive map of Torre de Moncorvo
- Coordinates: 41.17385862°N 7.05280207°W
- Country: Portugal
- Region: Norte
- Intermunic. comm.: Douro
- District: Bragança
- Seat: Torre de Moncorvo Municipal Chamber
- Parishes: 13

Government
  - President: Nuno Gonçalves (PSD)

Area
  - Total: 531.56 km^{2} (205.24 sq mi)

Population (2021)
  - Total: 6,826
  - Density: 12.84/km^{2} (33.26/sq mi)
- Time zone: UTC+00:00 (WET)
  - Summer (DST): UTC+01:00 (WEST)
- Website: www.cm-moncorvo.pt

Torre de Moncorvo (European Portuguese pronunciation: [ˈtoʁɨ ðɨ mõˈkoɾvu]), officially the Town of Torre de Moncorvo (Portuguese: Vila de Torre de Moncorvo), is a town and municipality in the district of Bragança in northern Portugal. In 2021, the municipality had 6,826 inhabitants, in an area of 531.56 square kilometres (205.24 mi^{2}), while the town had 2,612 inhabitants. Notably, in 2013, the municipality recorded the lowest birth rate in Portugal, 2.5 births per thousand inhabitants.

Situated along the Douro River valley in the historical Trás-os-Montes region, Torre de Moncorvo has medieval origins tied to its strategic frontier location during the Reconquista. The municipality includes 13 civil parishes and hosts several heritage sites, including medieval town walls and religious buildings. Torre de Moncorvo’s cultural heritage reflects a diverse history, including a once significant Jewish community with autonomous jurisdiction in the medieval period. The town’s annual municipal holiday is celebrated on March 19.

Torre de Moncorvo's economy is primarily driven by the public sector and services connected to agricultural activity. The municipality's largest crops are olives, almonds and vineyards. The municipality also hosts one of Europe’s largest iron ore deposits, historically central to the local economy and employment. Recent efforts to restart mining were halted, as of 2025, due to concession cancellation.

== Toponymy ==
According to popular tradition, Torre de Moncorvo’s name derives from a man known as Mem (or Mendo) Corvo, who lived in a tower in the region during the early Middle Ages. The legend tells that Mem Corvo discovered a hidden treasure and built a tower to protect it, which became known as Torre do Mendo (or Mem) do Corvo. Over time, this name evolved into Torre de Moncorvo.

The legend also recounts a romantic story of a Moorish woman named Zaida, baptized as Joana, who sought protection from Mem Corvo. Their plans to marry were tragically cut short by illness, adding a human dimension to the town’s mythical origins. However, this story is widely considered folklore rather than historical fact.

Historical research suggests that Mem Corvo may have been one of the “cavaleiros vilãos”, local frontier knights or leaders of small communities during the Reconquista. These figures often exercised regional power independently or semi-independently, filling the vacuum created by the unstable borders of the time. The king and established nobility sometimes sought alliances with such leaders.

== History ==
=== Early Settlement and Frontier Fortification ===
The region around Torre de Moncorvo has been inhabited since the early medieval period, particularly during the Christian Reconquest. By the reign of Afonso III of León, the Douro River had become a significant border zone, prompting the establishment of several castles in the Alto Douro area, including Numão and Almendra. The territory was organized into lordships, such as the Terra de Bragança, governed by the Bragança family.

With the consolidation of the Kingdom of Portugal under Afonso Henriques in the 12th century, the Crown sought to secure its frontier regions by granting royal charters (forals) to local settlements. King Afonso Henriques gave forals to Mós in 1162 and Urros in 1182, two localities within the modern-day municipality, intended to attract settlers and strengthen defense along the frontier. In Urros, initial population growth was slow and in 1236 the king ordered residents from Freixo de Espada à Cinta to relocate there. Another important early settlement was Santa Cruz da Vilariça, near the town of Torre de Moncorvo which received its foral in 1225 and became the seat of an independent concelho with its own julgado (judicial district).

By 1258, during the Inquirições of D. Afonso III, the name Torre de Moncorvo first appears, for a settlement with a church dedicated to James the Great, located to the south of the modern-day town. However, the formal establishment of Torre de Moncorvo as a municipality occurred later, on 12 April 1285, when King Dinis granted it its foral. This marked the it as the administrative center of its territory, elevating its status by absorbing the nearby community of Santa Cruz da Vilariça and granting legal privileges to its inhabitants. Due to its frontier position, the foral included special exemptions from certain taxes and unique judicial privileges for its knights.

During this period, the town was home to a significant Jewish community and was granted autonomous Jewish jurisdiction, making it one of only seven such centers in the kingdom. The judiaria likely had authority over the broader Trás-os-Montes region, and its presence is documented throughout the 14th and 15th centuries. Located behind what is now the Misericórdia Church (Igreja da Misericórdia), the Jewish quarter included a synagogue that tradition holds still stands as a private residence on Rua Nova.

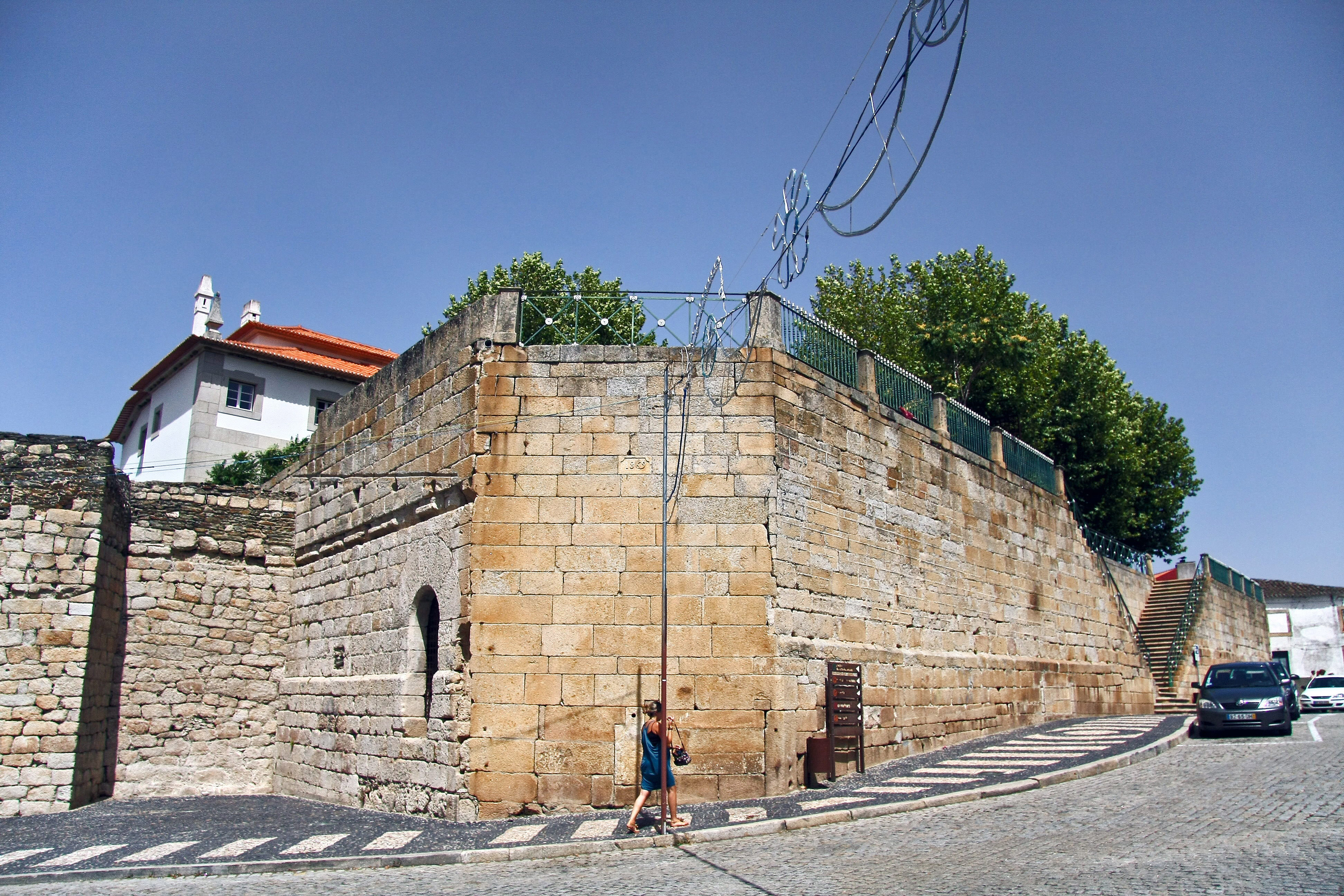
Walls of Torre de Moncorvo

Recognizing its strategic border location, the Crown prioritized the construction of a fortress and defensive walls on a nearby hill outside the original settlement, with royal support throughout the late 13th and 14th centuries. For example, a 1295 document orders that tithes from the churches of Vila Flor be first applied to building Torre de Moncorvo’s fortress, before supporting Vila Flor’s own defenses. Later in 1366, King Pedro I commanded the residents of Urros and Peredo to help with the fortification works. Later, in 1370, King Fernando incorporated the julgado of Urros into Torre de Moncorvo’s municipality, a change confirmed in 1376.

The urban area of Torre de Moncorvo developed within the castle walls, but a suburb (arrabalde) gradually expanded along the southern road toward Beira. In the 15th century, tensions arose between residents inside the walls and those in the suburb over the control of markets and fairs. To resolve these disputes, the Crown intervened by dividing the annual fair between the two zones to balance competing interests.

=== Modern era ===
Towards the end of the 15th century, Torre de Moncorvo experienced significant demographic and institutional changes. Following the 1492 expulsion of Jews from Spain, many refugees initially settled in the nearby fields of Vilariça and four years later, King Manuel I expelled Portugal's Jewish population or forced them to convert to Catholicism. Nonetheless, Torre de Moncorvo remained an important center of crypto-Judaism in northern Portugal, enduring into the 20th century. This is evidenced by more than 300 inquisitorial cases involving local residents and evidence of a functioning synagogue in a private residence near the Moncorvo Basilica (Basílica Menor de Nossa Senhora da Assunção).

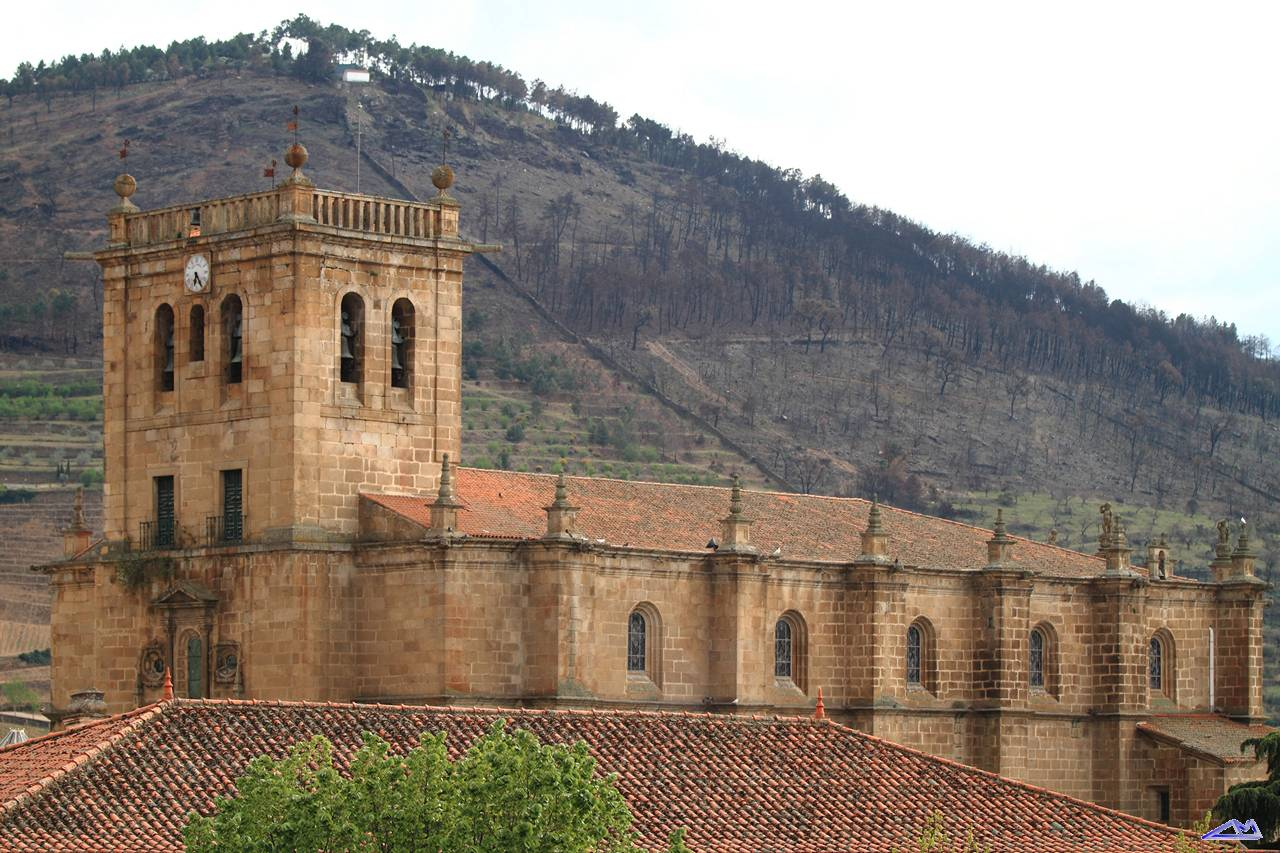
Moncorvo Basilica (Basílica Menor de Nossa Senhora da Assunção)

Amid these religious and social shifts, King Manuel I granted the town a new foral in 1512, reorganizing its administration and confirming its importance as one of the largest municipal districts in the kingdom. Benefiting from its location in the fertile Vale da Vilariça and its strategic position between the northern Douro and the Beira Alta wine region, Torre de Moncorvo developed into a thriving commercial hub. The town’s prosperity during this period is reflected in the construction of major religious buildings, including the Moncorvo Basilica and the Misericórdia Church.

In the 17th century, under King João IV, the Royal Linen and Hemp Factory was established to promote textile production. By the 18th century, silk cultivation gradually replaced flax, continuing the local textile tradition. Mining began in 1874 after the discovery of one of Portugal’s largest iron ore deposits in the area.

To support the growing mining industry, the Sabor railway line was constructed in the early 20th century, linking Torre de Moncorvo to the Douro line at Pocinho. Inaugurated in 1911, the local station was initially located on the outskirts of town but was later absorbed into the urban fabric as the town expanded. The railway enabled large-scale transport of iron ore, stimulating local development and the emergence of mining settlements. The line was closed in 1988 following the decline of mining activity.

== Geography ==
Torre de Moncorvo is located in northeastern Portugal, within the district of Bragança and the historical province of Trás-os-Montes. The municipality is situated along the Douro River valley and by the Serra do Reboredo and is part of the Douro intermunicipal community. Torre de Moncorvo borders the municipalities of Vila Nova de Foz Côa to the southwest, Freixo de Espada à Cinta to the southeast, Mogadouro, Anfândega da Fé and Vila Flor to the North and Carrazeda de Ansiães to the west.

=== Parishes ===
Administratively, the municipality is divided into 13 civil parishes (freguesias):

- Açoreira
- Adeganha e Cardanha
- Cabeça Boa
- Carviçais
- Castedo
- Felgar e Souto da Velha
- Felgueiras e Maçores
- Horta da Vilariça
- Larinho
- Lousa
- Mós
- Torre de Moncorvo
- Urrós e Peredo dos Castelhanos

== Economy ==
The economy of Torre de Moncorvo is primarily driven by the public sector and services, with limited industrial activity and some agriculture. The main sources of employment in the municipality are public administration, financial services, and services related to agriculture, such as cooperatives, storage facilities for agrochemical products and agricultural machinery suppliers. The secondary sector plays a minor role, with the few existing industries largely concentrated in the agri-food sector.

Agriculture's importance has decreased in Torre de Moncorvo, in both its economic weight and geographical scope. Population loss from emigration or urbanization has led to a decrease in traditional agriculture, including crops such as cereals. Olive groves and almond orchards are now the dominant forms of cultivation, supported by the region’s dry, Mediterranean climate. Vineyards are an important crop in some civil parishes, which are a part of the Douro wine region, such as Lousa, Cabeça Boa and Horta da Vilariça.

The municipality is the site of the Torre de Moncorvo mines, one of Europe's most significant iron ore deposits. After several decades of inactivity, mining operations resumed in 2020 under Aethel Mining, following the acquisition of a 30-year concession initially granted in 2016 to MTI – Ferro de Moncorvo, S.A. The project involved open-pit mining in Cabeço da Mua in the areas of Carvalhal, Felgar, and Souto da Velha, with plans to extract six million tonnes of iron ore by 2026 and an estimated investment of €114 million. In its initial phase, the operation was expected to create over 200 direct jobs and up to 800 indirect jobs. However, in April 2025, the Portuguese government cancelled the concession, citing legal and contractual non-compliance by Aethel Mining. In August 2025, the government stated that there were no other companies interested in exploring these mines.

Mining activity in Torre de Moncorvo dates back to the Iron Age, with industrial extraction beginning in the late 18th century. During the 1950s, the mines were the largest employer in the region, providing work for approximately 1,500 miners. At that time, operations were managed by Minacorvo, Lda., which was dissolved following the Portuguese revolution of 1974, with its concessions transferred to the state-owned Ferrominas. Mining came to a halt in 1983 after the bankruptcy of Ferrominas.

== Governance ==
The present mayor is José Meneses, elected by the Social Democratic Party (PSD).

== Landmarks ==
The municipality of Torre de Moncorvo contains several officially classified heritage sites and landmarks. The Castle and Town Walls of Torre de Moncorvo are of medieval origin. Although the castle no longer exists, some sections of the defensive walls remain visible, integrated into later buildings. Three of the original gates are still present, including the Porta da Vila, which is surmounted by a small chapel.

There are other castle walls and ruins across the municipality. The archaeological site of Santa Cruz da Vilariça, classified as a National Monument, displays walls and ruins of a medieval settlement abandoned in the 13th century, when residents moved to the town of Moncorvo. In the village of Mós, the Castle of Mós preserves parts of its former perimeter wall, built on an oval plan. The structure reflects typical patterns of medieval settlement, with a central longitudinal street and a square outside the main gate.

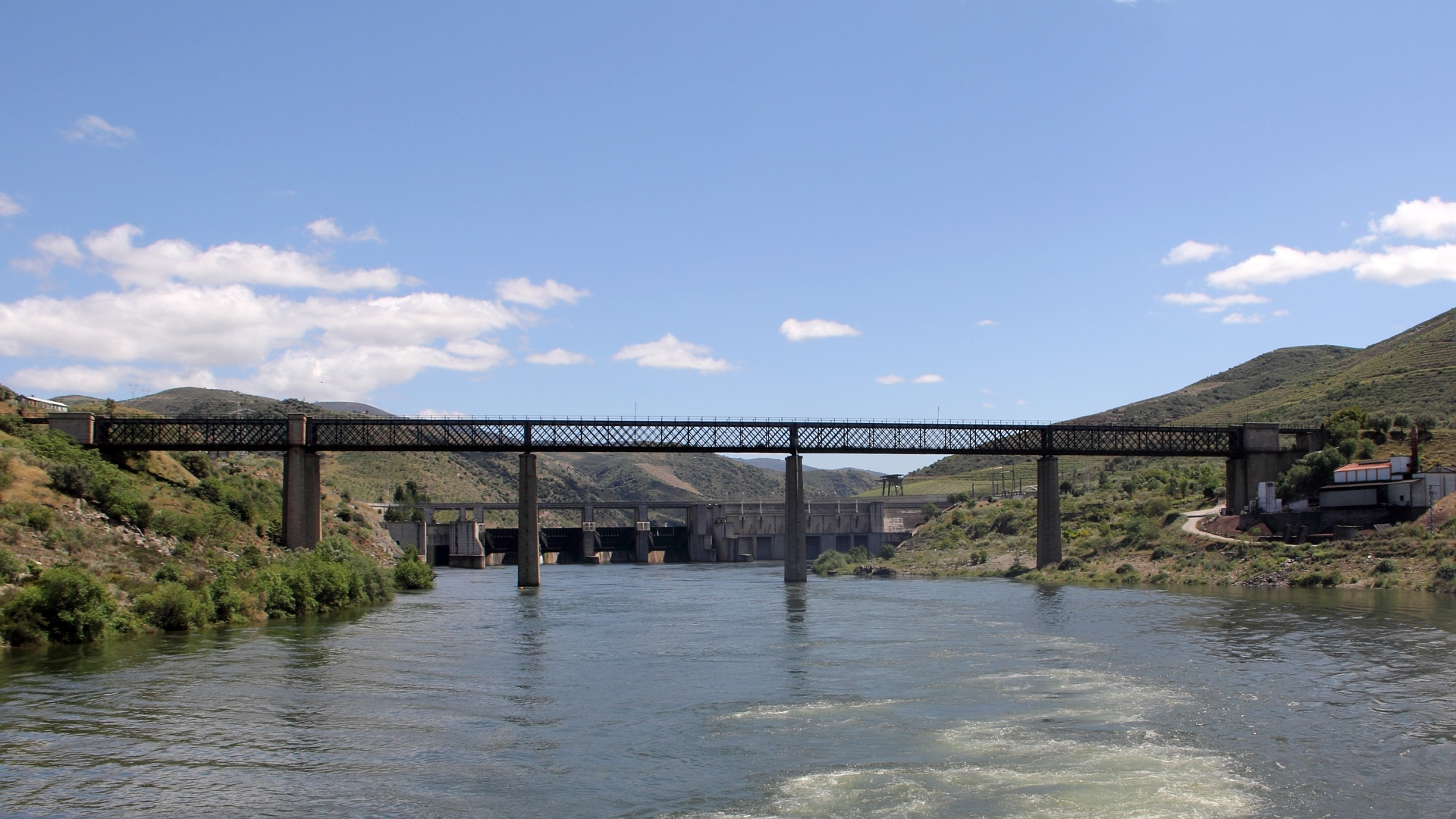
Pocinho Bridge

The Pocinho Bridge is a metal truss bridge with two superimposed decks, originally designed to accommodate both road and rail traffic. Completed in the early 20th century, it connects Torre de Moncorvo to the opposite bank of the Douro River.

=== Religious landmarks ===
Across the municipality of Torre de Moncorvo there are several religious buildings, both in the town of Moncorvo and across the various parishes. The most prominent is the Moncorvo Basilica (Basílica Menor de Nossa Senhora da Assunção), the town’s mother church, classified as a National Monument in 1910 and elevated to the rank of minor basilica in 2022. Built between 1544 and the early 17th century, it features a Renaissance façade with a dominant bell tower and a hall church interior with three naves of equal height. Notable elements include its mid 18th century Baroque altarpiece, frescoes depicting the Communion of the Virgin and the Last Supper, a Flemish triptych dedicated to Saint Anne, and an 18th-century pipe organ.

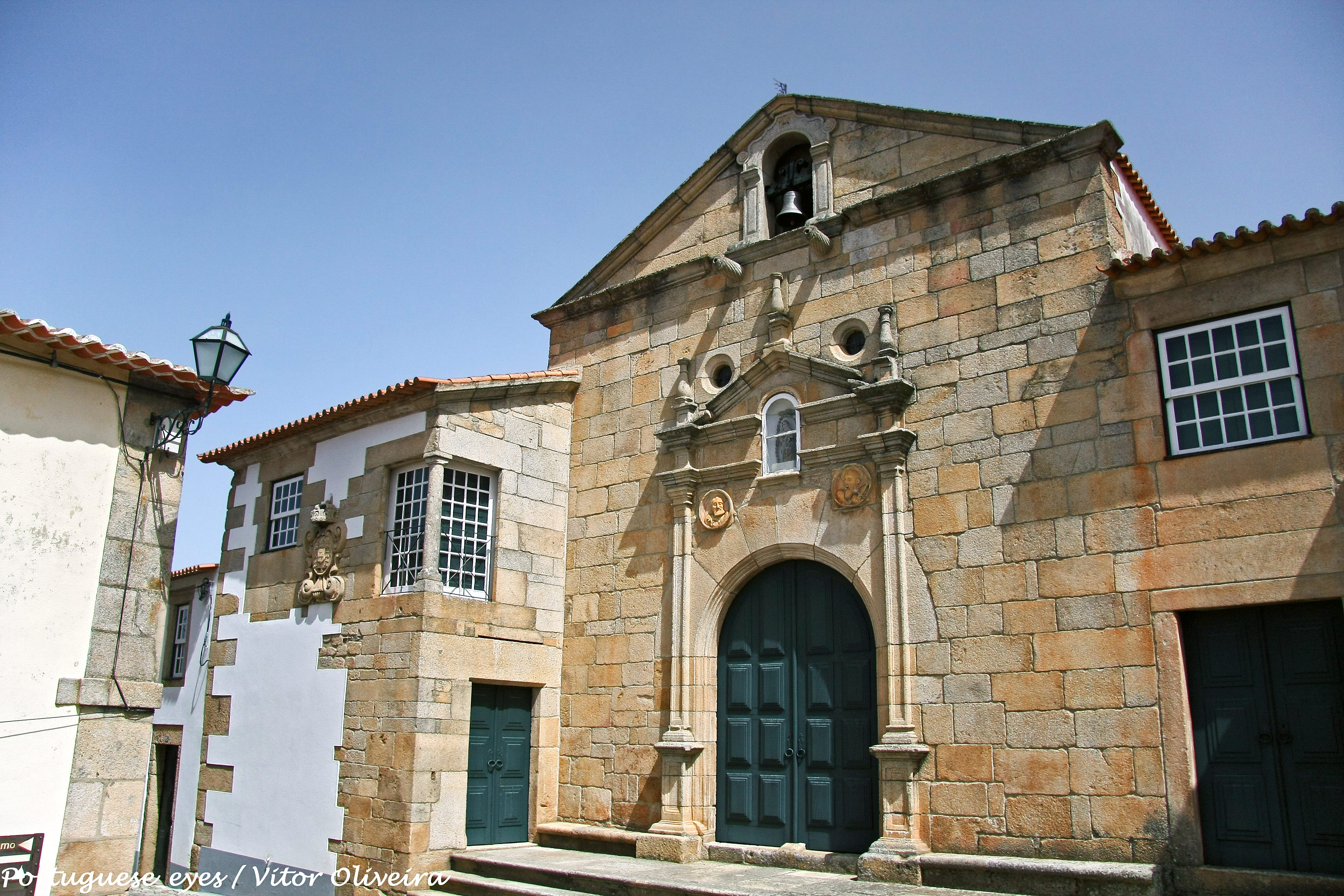
Misericórdia Church

Also within the town lies the Misericórdia Church (Igreja da Misericórdia), which dates back to the 16th-century and was later modified with Mannerist, Baroque elements. It has a main façade marked by a Mannerist portal with Tuscan columns, flanked by oculi and crowned by a triangular pediment with a niche of the Virgin and Child. Inside, it preserves a Baroque gilded altarpiece and a notable stone pulpit considered among the finest of its kind in Portugal. This church hosts Torre de Moncorvo's sacred art museum.

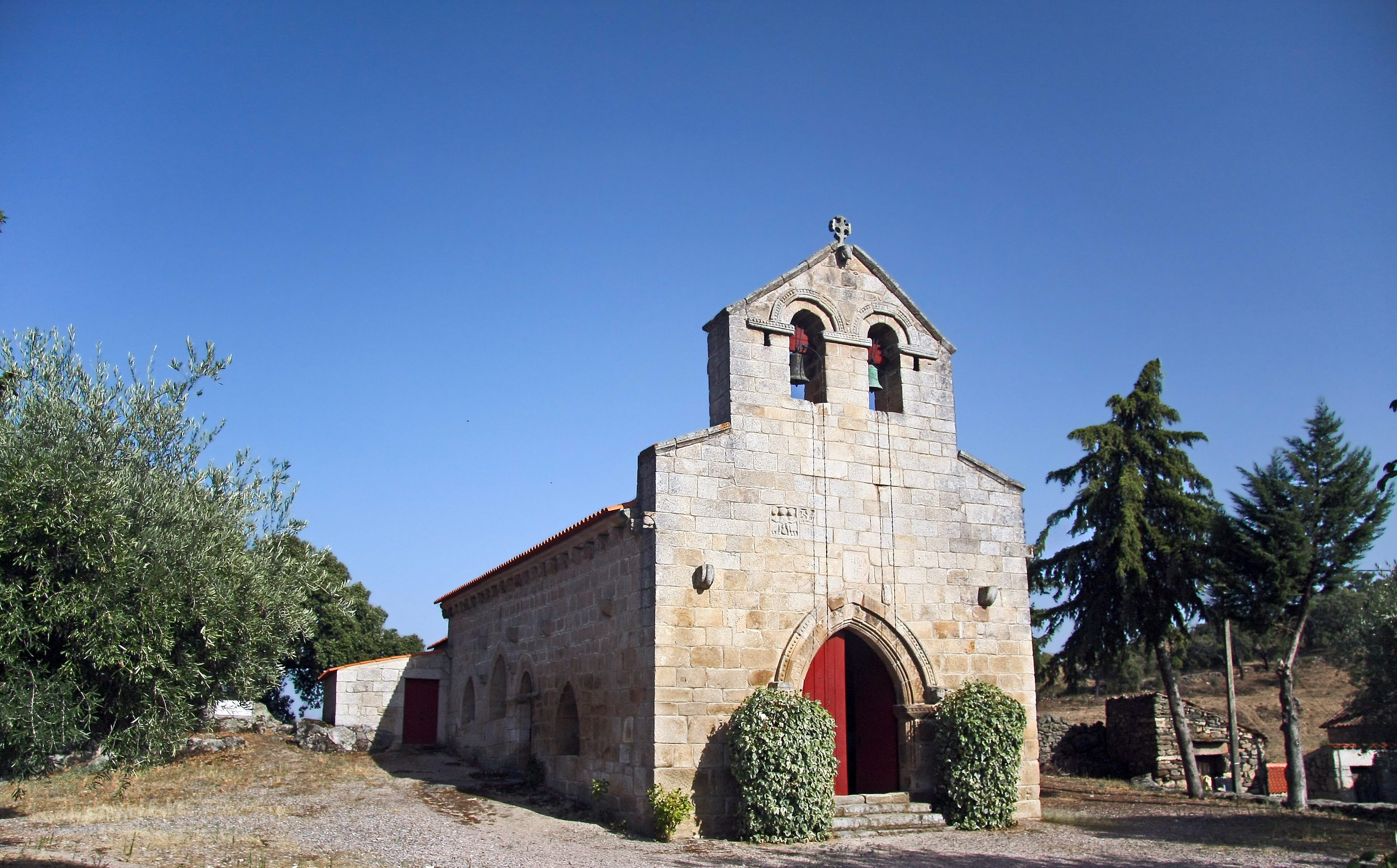
Church of James the Great in Adeganha

Beyond the town, two parish churches stand out for their historical and artistic significance. The Church of James the Great in Adeganha (Igreja de Santiago Maior de Adeganha), classified as a National Monument, dates back to the 12th century and is a significant example of late Romanesque architecture with Gothic influences. Its façade features a decorated pointed arch, while the interior preserves fragments of 15th and 16th century mural paintings.

Also noteworthy is the Church of Our Lady of the Purification in Larinho (Igreja de Nossa Senhora da Purificação), built between 1766 and 1796 and classified as a Monument of Public Interest. It has a Rococo influenced Baroque façade with a curved pediment, niches containing statues of Saint Peter, Saint Paul, and the Virgin of the Purification, and a bell tower attached to the main front. The single-nave interior features several Baroque and Rocaille altars, of which the Altar of the Souls in Purgatory is particularly remarkable, and a painted wooden ceiling depicting the Evangelists and the Blessed Sacrament.

== Sports ==
Torre de Moncorvo is home to Grupo Desportivo Torre de Moncorvo, a sports club founded in 1967. The men's football team competes in the Divisão de Honra of the Bragança Football Association and previously played in the national leagues, including a season in the third tier Campeonato de Portugal.

== Infrastructure ==
The municipality of Torre de Moncorvo is served by a network of national and regional roads, with the IP2 functioning as its main north–south axis. The IP2 crosses the western part of the municipality, connecting Torre de Moncorvo southward to Pocinho and Vila Nova de Foz Côa, and northward toward Macedo de Cavaleiros, with indirect access to Vila Flor and Alfândega da Fé via regional link roads. The National Road 220 (N220) provides an east–west connection, linking the town of Torre de Moncorvo to the IP2 to the west and to the parishes of Larinho, Carviçais, and Felgar e Souto da Velha to the east.

Rodonorte is the main operator of local and regional bus services in Torre de Moncorvo. Services link Torre de Moncorvo to nearby localities such as Felgueiras, Cabeça de Mouro, Lousa, Adeganha, Souto da Velha and Peredo dos Castelhanos. Additionally, intermunicipal connections provide access to larger towns and other localities outside of the municipality, including Freixo de Espada à Cinta, Bragança, Miranda do Douro, Pocinho and Mirandela.

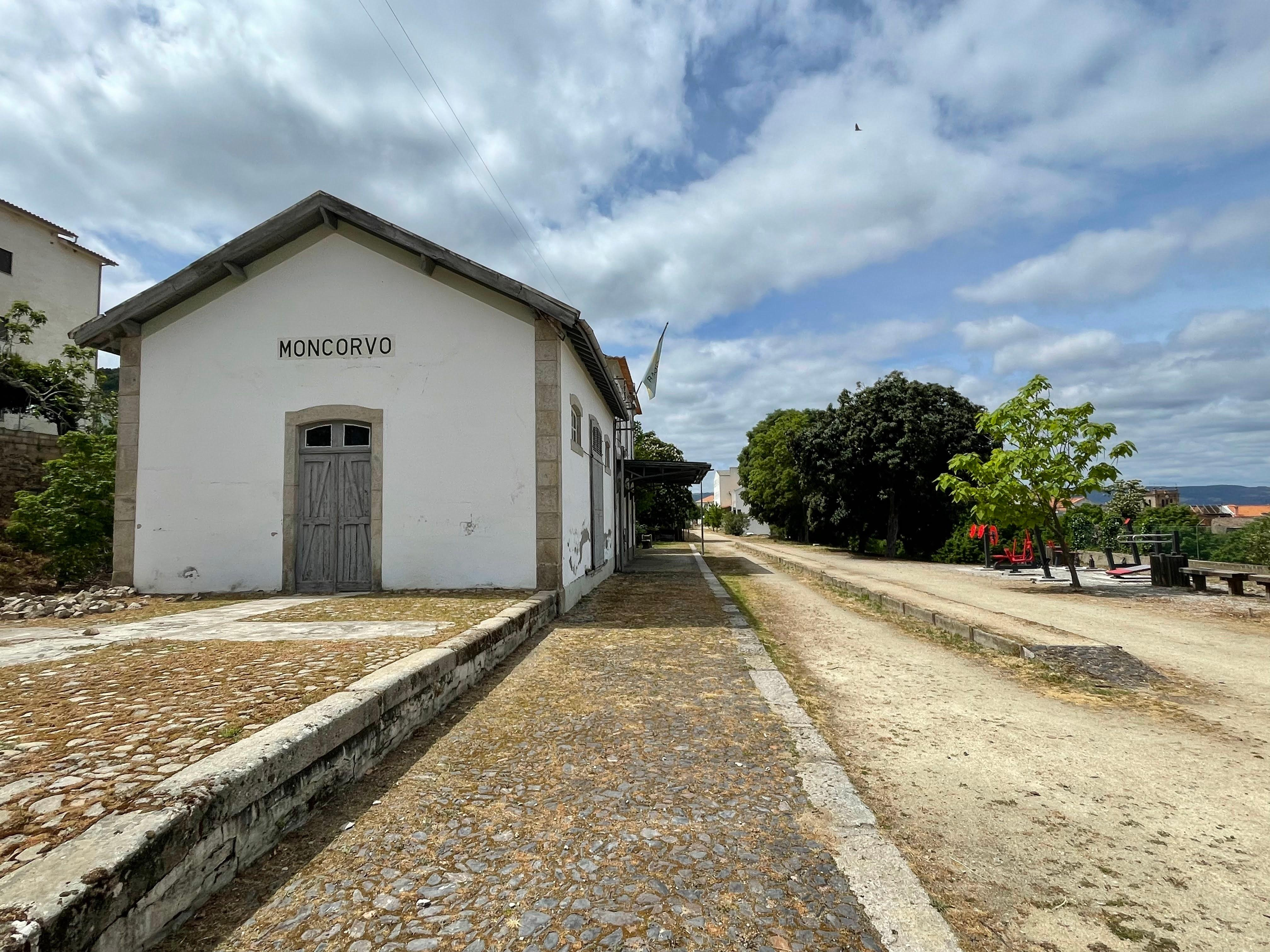
Torre de Moncorvo station

The closest active railway station is located in Pocinho, on the Douro line, 7.7 kilometres (4.8 mi) from Torre de Moncorvo. Historically, the municipality was served by the narrow-gauge Sabor line, which connected it to the Douro line at Pocinho. The Sabor line operated from the early 20th century until its closure in 1988. It was initially built primarily to transport iron ore from the Serra do Reboredo mines in the municipality, as well as to provide passenger services to local communities. Within the municipality, several railway stops and stations were part of this line, including Moncorvo railway station, Carviçais station, Felgar halt, Larinho halt, Quinta de Água halt, Quinta Nova halt, Souto da Velha halt, and Zimbro halt.

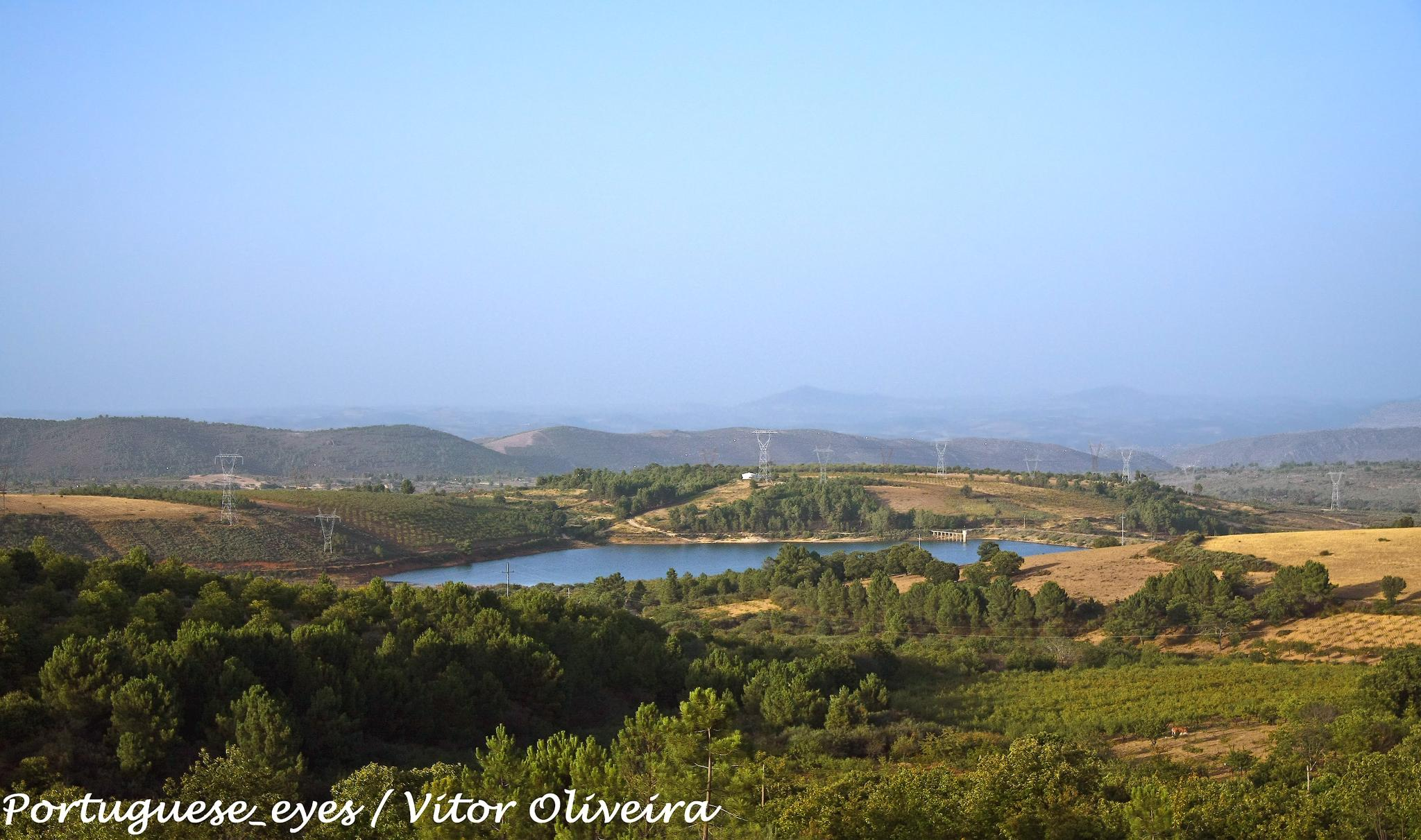
Vale de Ferreiros reservoir

A 34 kilometres (21 mi) stretch of the deactivated Sabor railway line between Pocinho and Carviçais has been converted into the Ecopista do Sabor, a paved pedestrian and cycling path within the municipality of Torre de Moncorvo. The route offers views over the Douro River, Torre de Moncorvo, the Sabor Valley, and the Serra do Reboredo. Along the way, users can see local landmarks such as the Convent of the Carmelo da Sagrada Família and, in Larinho, a repurposed railway station now serving as a café. Near Carvalhal, the path passes close to the site of former iron mines, and at the base of Cabeço da Mua, it overlooks the villages of Felgar and Souto da Velha. Approaching Carviçais, the trail provides a view over the Vale de Ferreiros reservoir.

== Notable people ==
- André Dias (born 1992), a footballer with 166 club appearances and 15 international youth caps.
