= Quinta Nova halt =

Closed halt in northeast Portugal

Quinta Nova halt Apeadeiro de Quinta Nova
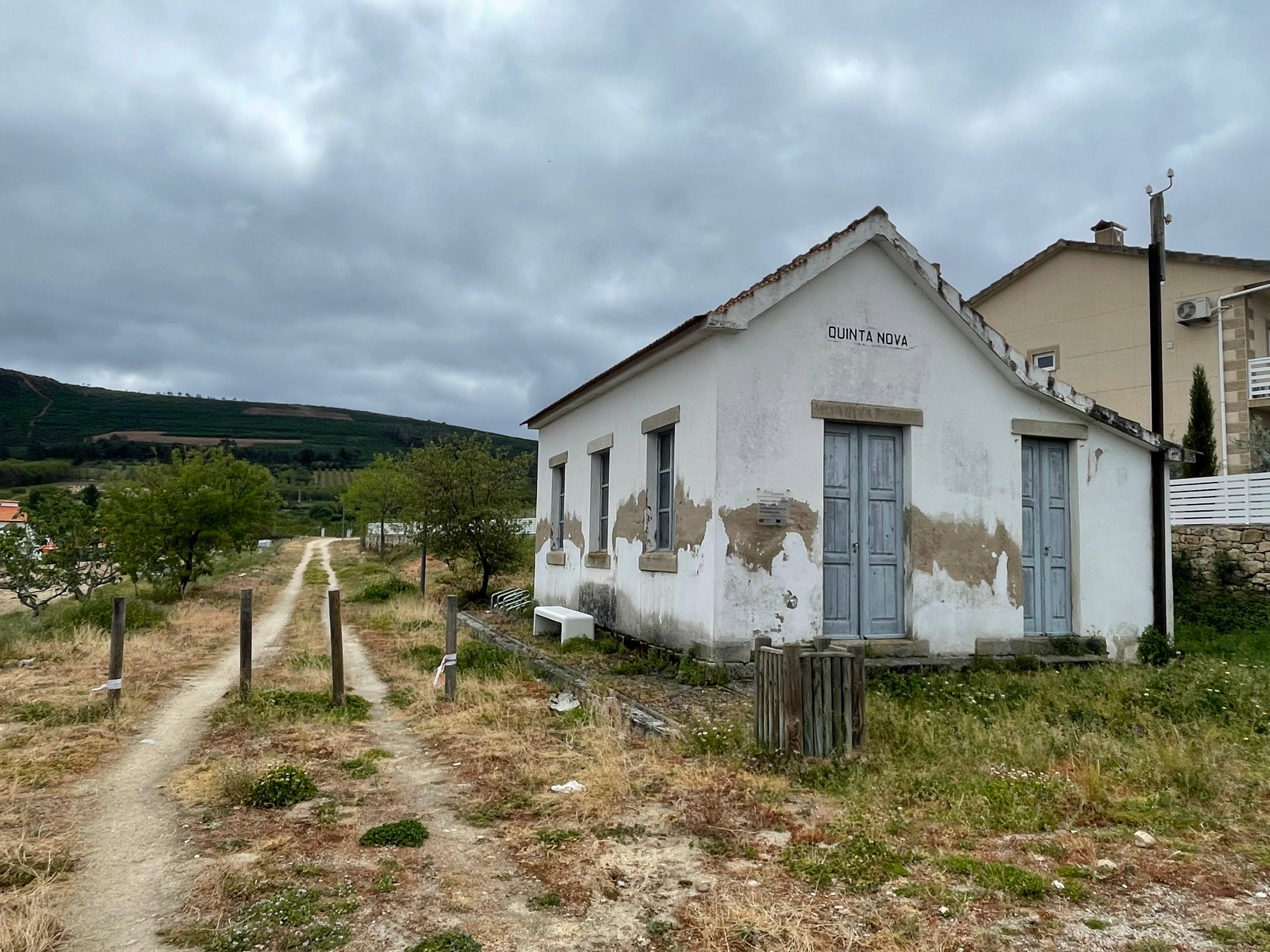
- Quinta Nova halt, 2023

General information
- Location: Torre de Moncorvo; Portugal
- Coordinates: 41°11′01.62″N 6°58′39.48″W
- Line: Sabor line (1911-1988)
- Distance: Pocinho - 21,9km; Mogadouro - 50,655km; Duas Igrejas - Miranda - 83,39km
- Connections: Carvalhal; Lamelas

History
- Opened: 17 September 1911
- Closed: 1 August 1988
Location
- Location within Portugal

The Quinta Nova halt was a station on the Sabor line, located in the municipality of Torre de Moncorvo in Portugal.

== History ==
This interface was on the section of the Sabor Line between Pocinho and Carviçais, which entered service on 17 September 1911. The line was closed on 1 August 1988 which consequently led to the abandonment of the Quinta Nova halt.

== See also ==
- Rail transport in Portugal
- History of rail transport in Portugal

== Bibliography ==
- REIS, Francisco; GOMES, Rosa; GOMES, Gilberto; et al. (2006). Os Caminhos de Ferro Portugueses 1856-2006. Lisboa: CP-Comboios de Portugal e Público-Comunicação Social S. A. p. 238. ISBN 989-619-078-X.
