= Zimbro halt =

Discontinued halt in northeast Portugal

Zimbro halt Apeadeiro de Zimbro
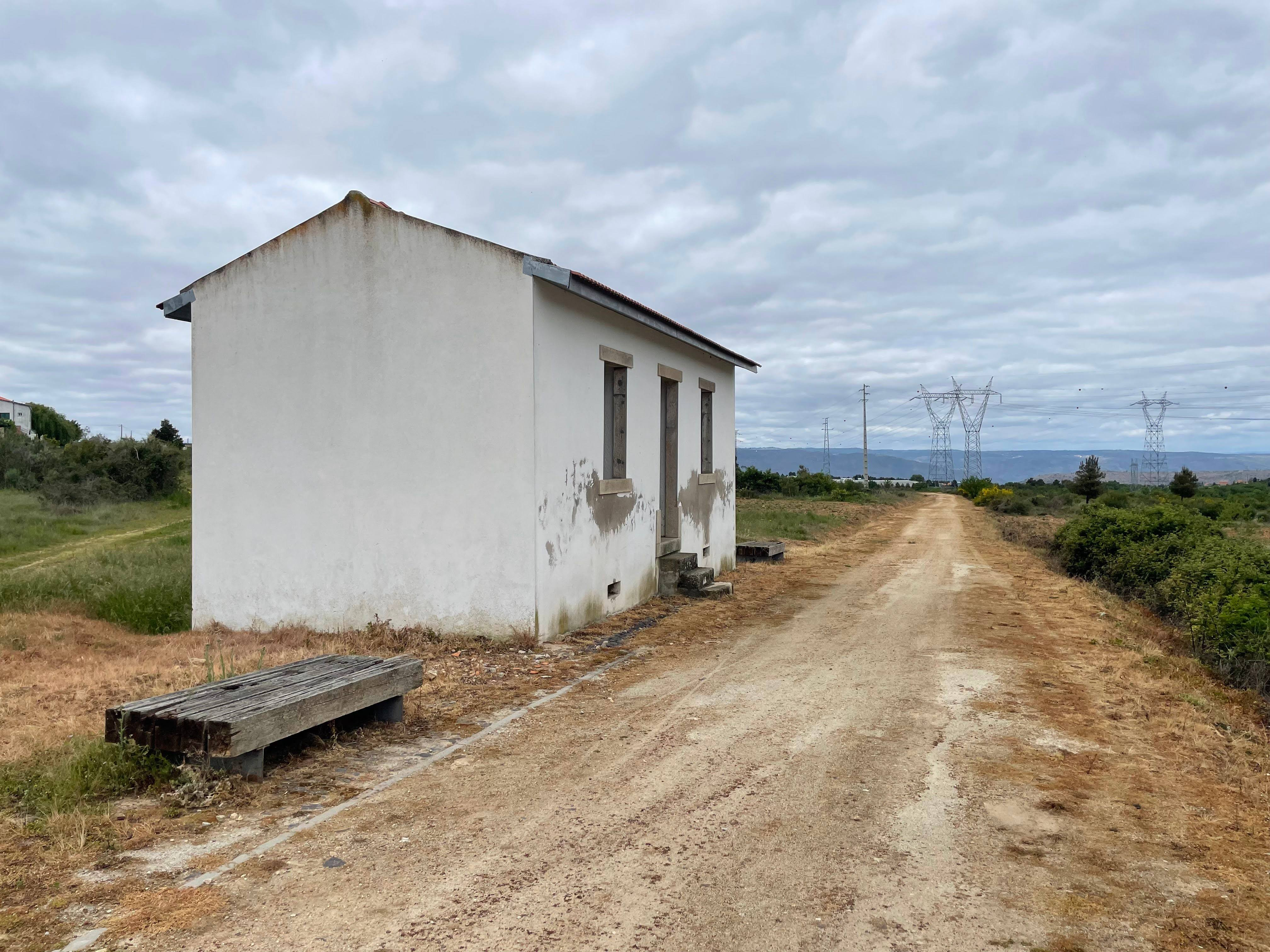
- Zimbro halt in 2023

General information
- Location: Torre de Moncorvo; Portugal
- Coordinates: 41°11′15″N 6°59′59″W
- Line: Sabor line (1911-1988)
- Distance: Pocinho - 18.4km; Mogadouro - 54.1km; Duas Igrejas - Miranda - 86.9km
- Connections: Lamelas; Larinho

Other information
- Website: https://www.infraestruturasdeportugal.pt/negocios-e-servicos/horarios

History
- Opened: 17 September 1911
- Closed: 1 August 1988
Location
- Location within Portugal

The Zimbro halt was a station on the Sabor line, located in the municipality of Torre de Moncorvo in Portugal.

== History ==
This interface was located on the section of the Sabor line between Pocinho railway station and Carviçais railway station, which entered service on 17 September 1911. The line and the Zimbro halt were closed on 1 August 1988.

The halt is now used as a stop of the Ecopista do Sabor, a greenway that follows the now abandoned Sabor railway line.

== See also ==
- Sabor Line
- Rail transport in Portugal
- History of rail transport in Portugal

== Bibliography ==
- REIS, Francisco; GOMES, Rosa; GOMES, Gilberto; et al. (2006). Os Caminhos de Ferro Portugueses 1856-2006. Lisboa: CP-Comboios de Portugal e Público-Comunicação Social S. A. p. 238. ISBN 989-619-078-X.
- Martins, João Paulo; Brion, Madalena; Sousa, Miguel de; Levy, Maurício; Amorim, Óscar (1996). O Caminho de Ferro Revisitado: O Caminho de Ferro em Portugal de 1856 a 1996 [The Railway Revisited: The Railway in Portugal from 1856 to 1996] (in Portuguese). Caminhos de Ferro Portugueses. p. 446.
