= Pocinho Bridge =

Bridge in northern Portugal

Pocinho Bridge Ponte do Pocinho
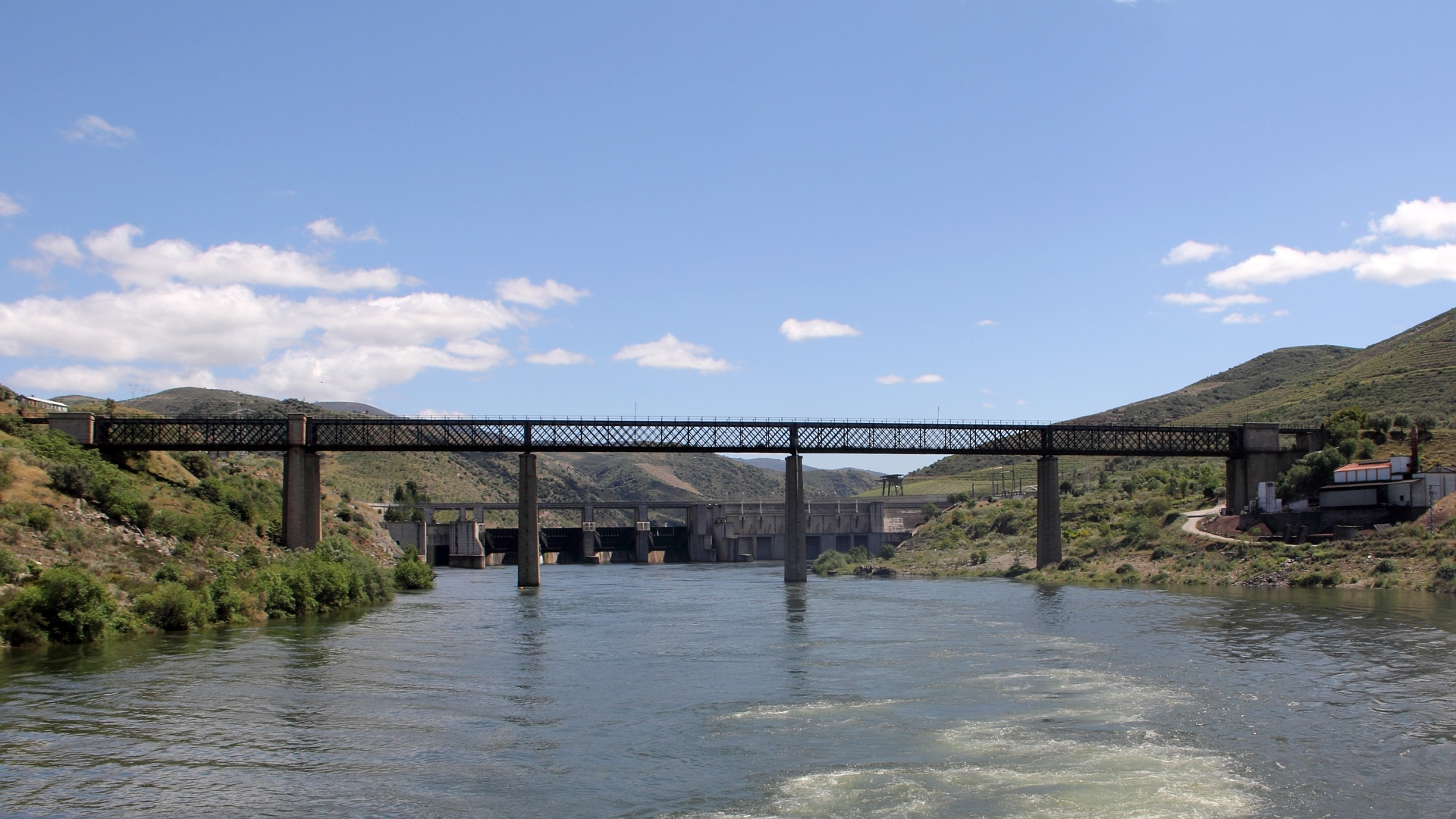
- Coordinates: 41°08′04″N 7°07′12″W
- Carries: Sabor line
- Crosses: Douro
- Locale: Pocinho

Characteristics
- Total length: 262 m (860 ft)

History
- Opened: November 1903
- Inaugurated: 4 July 1909
- Closed: 1 August 1988

Location
- Interactive map of Pocinho Bridge

The Road-rail bridge of Pocinho, commonly known as Pocinho Bridge, is a road-rail bridge in Vila Nova de Foz Côa, Portugal. The structure was part of the now defunct rail network Sabor line, and is now closed to both types of transit.

== Construction ==
In the turn of the 19th century, the necessity of a new bridge above the Douro connecting the Estrada Real number 9 between the parishes of Pocinho and Miranda, in the Bragança District, arose. The two public tenders opened by the Portuguese Government in July 1901 and May 1902 were not successful, so the Government authorized its railway department, Caminhos de Ferro do Estado, to negotiate the project with Empresa Industrial Portuguesa. Construction started in 1903 and the bridge was opened to the public on 4 July 1909. The upper board of the bridge was opened to exploration as part of the railway Sabor line on 1911.

The bridge consists of two decks: an upper deck for railway use and a lower deck for road use which was connected to Estrada Real 9. The bridge has three central spans of 54m and two outer spans of 45m.

== Decline and closure ==
The railway line was closed in 1988. In 2001, car traffic was closed in the lower board of the bridge due to the existence of an alternative to the crossing using the Pocinho Dam, close to the centenary bridge. In 2009, the municipalities of Torre de Moncorvo and Vila Nova de Foz Côa filed a request for the bridge to be classified as a heritage structure due to its history, tourism value, and as an access point for the neighboring Sabor eco-path.

== See also ==
- List of bridges in Portugal

== Sources ==
- Machado, Carlos Alberto d'Abreu Ferreira (2011). La vertebración del territorio ibérico de la raya duriense y las vías de transporte: éxitos y fracasos (PhD) (in Portuguese). University of Salamanca. doi:10.14201/gredos.115563. hdl:10366/115563.
