= Torre de Moncorvo Municipal Chamber =

Legislative body of Torre de Moncorvo

Coordinates: 41.17536°N 7.05211°W

Torre de Moncorvo Municipal Chamber Câmara Municipal de Torre de Moncorvo
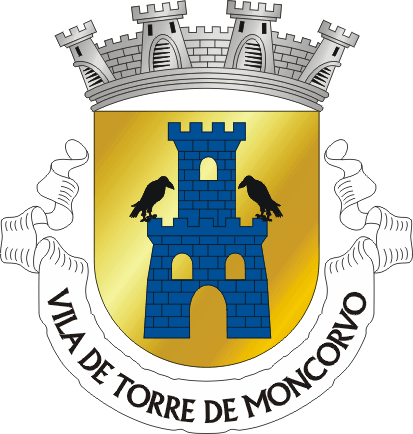
- Coat of arms of the town of Torre de Moncorvo

Type
- Type: Câmara municipal
- Term limits: 3

History
- Founded: 1285; 740 years ago

Leadership
- President: José Sá Meneses, PSD since 20 October 2021
- Vice President: Catarina Luís Mosqueiro Dias, PSD since 20 October 2021

Structure
- Seats: 5
- Political groups: Municipal Executive (3) PSD (2) CDS (1) Opposition (2) Independent (1) PS (1)
- Length of term: Four years

Elections
- Last election: 26 September 2021
- Next election: Sometime between 22 September and 14 October 2025

Meeting place
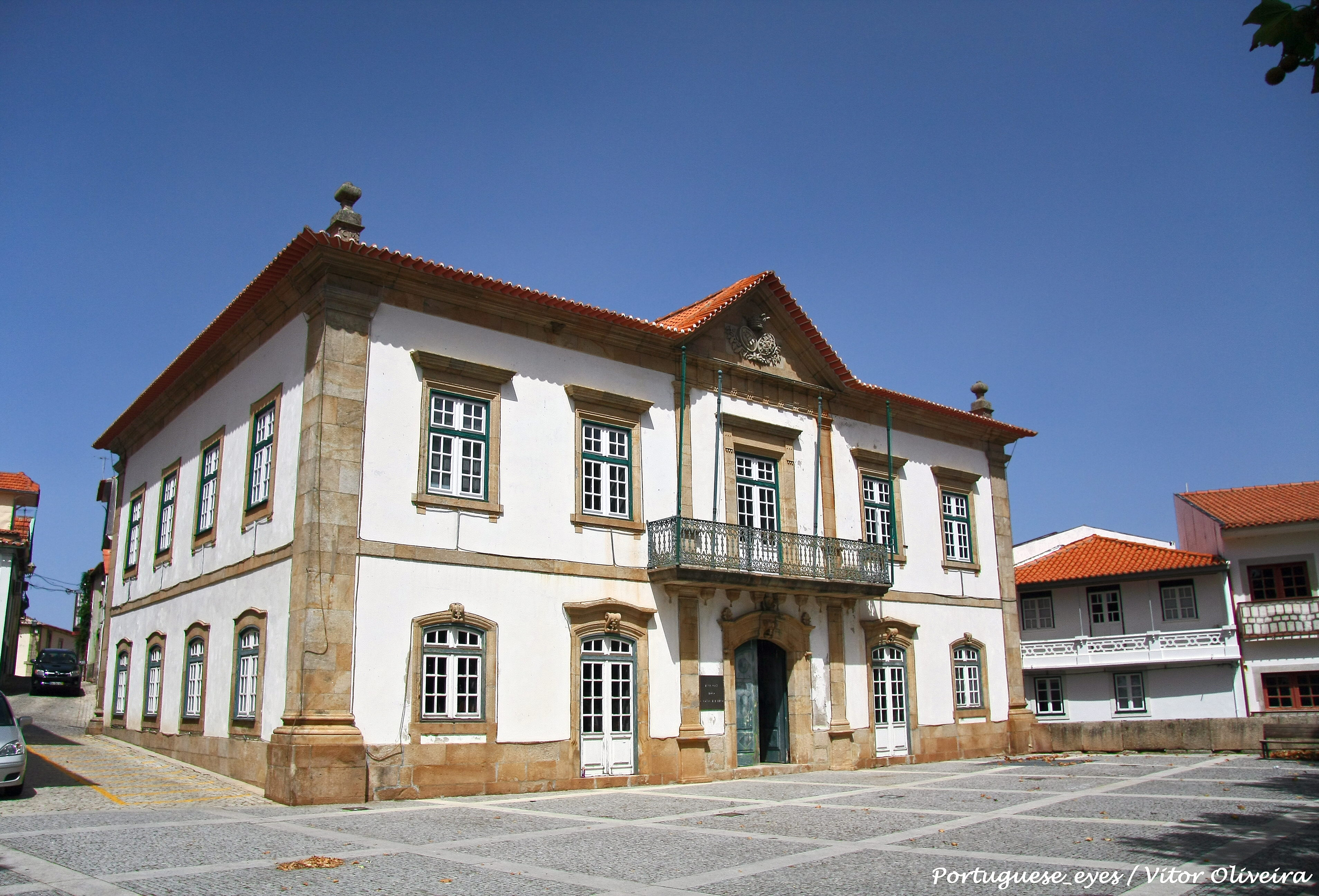
- Paços do Concelho de Torre de Moncorvo

Website
- www.cm-moncorvo.pt

The Torre de Moncorvo Municipal Chamber (Portuguese: Câmara Municipal de Torre de Moncorvo) is the administrative authority in the municipality of Torre de Moncorvo. It has 13 freguesias in its area of jurisdiction and is based in the town of Torre de Moncorvo, on the Bragança District. These freguesias are: Açoreira; Adeganha e Cardanha; Cabeça Boa; Carviçais; Castedo; Felgar e Souto da Velha; Felgueiras e Maçores; Horta da Vilariça; Larinho; Lousa; Mós; Torre de Moncorvo and Urros e Peredo dos Castelhanos.

The Torre de Moncorvo City Council is made up of 5 councillors, representing, currently, four different political forces. The first candidate on the list with the most votes in a municipal election or, in the event of a vacancy, the next candidate on the list, takes office as President of the Municipal Chamber.

== List of the Presidents of the Municipal Chamber of Torre de Moncorvo ==
- José António Marrana – (1976–1979)
- Almiro Ângelo Sotta – (1979–1982)
- Rui Fernandes Marrana – (1982–1984)
- António Rodrigues Braga – (1984–1985)
- Fernando Aires Ferreira – (1985–1986)
- José Manuel Aires – (1986–1997)
- Fernando Aires Ferreira – (1997–1999)
- José Manuel Aires – (1999–2000)
- Fernando Aires Ferreira – (2000–2013)
- Nuno Rodrigues Gonçalves – (2013–2024)
- José Sá Meneses – (2024–2025)

(The list is incomplete)
