= Castle of Torre de Moncorvo =

Castle in Torre de Moncorvo, Bragança, Portugal

Coordinates: 41°10′30″N 7°3′9″W

Castle of Torre de Moncorvo is a 13th-century castle in Torre de Moncorvo, Bragança District, Portugal. It is classified by IGESPAR as a Site of Public Interest.

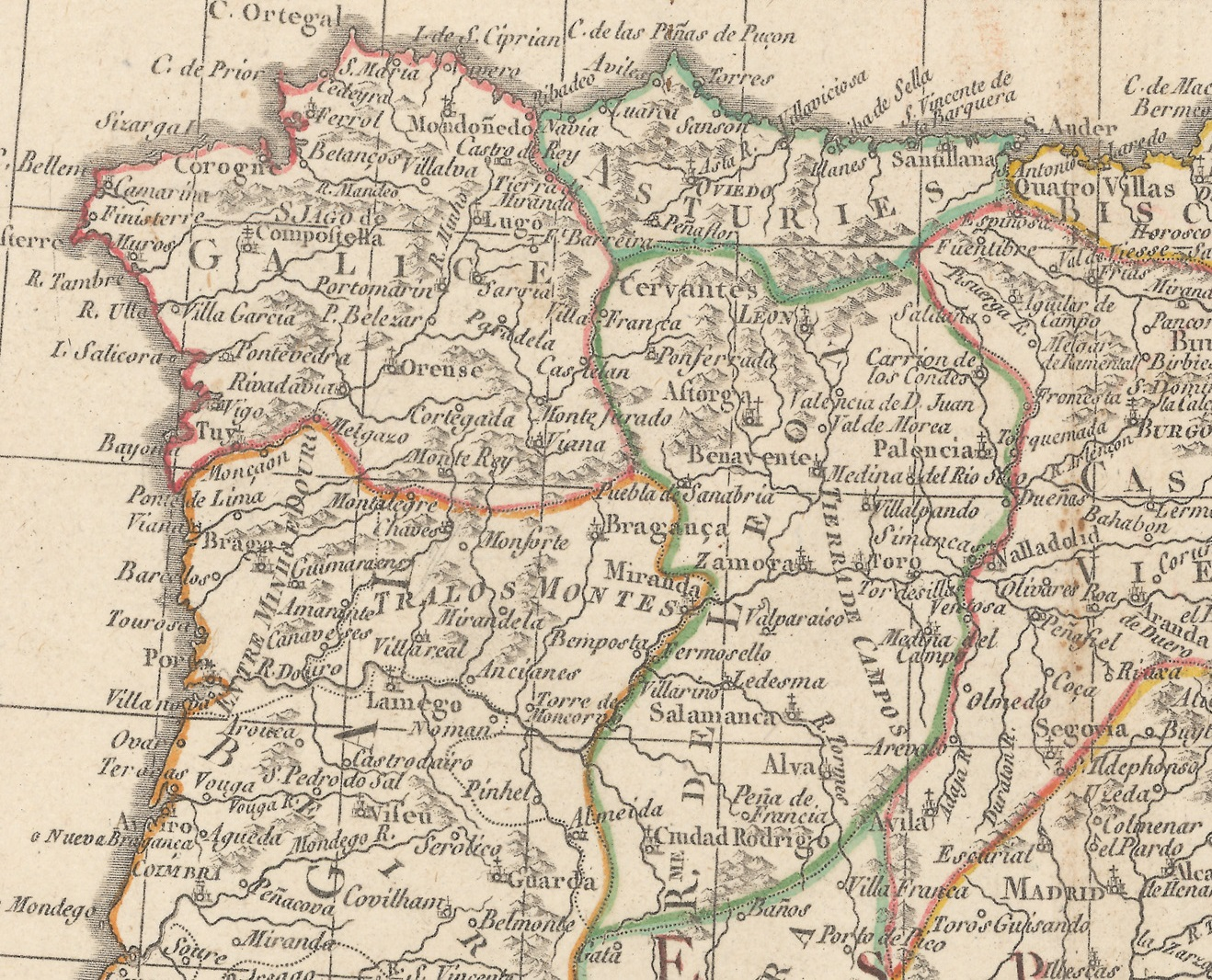
Iberian map from 1780 with the Castle of Torre de Moncorvo
