= Carviçais =

Portuguese village and parish

- Civil parish
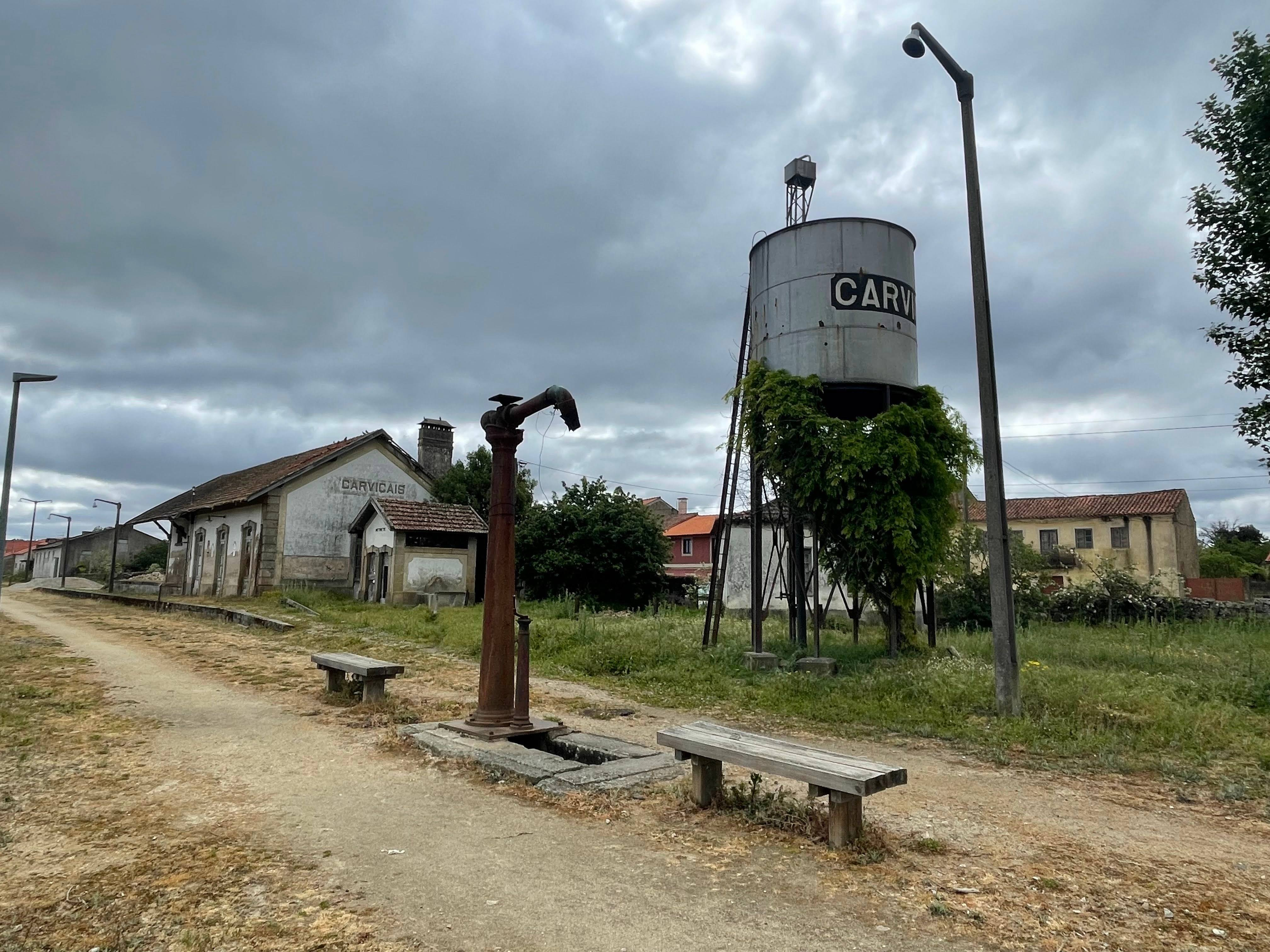
- The Carviçais railway station complex, 24 April 2023

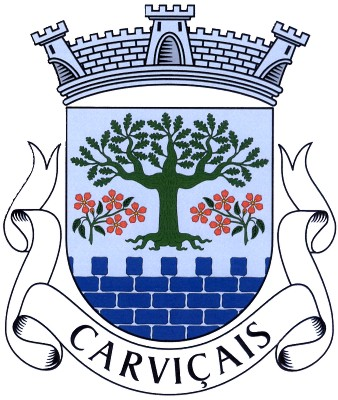
- Coat of arms

- Location in Portugal
- Coordinates: 41.181°N 6.893°W
- Country: Portugal
- Region: Norte
- Intermunic. comm.: Douro
- District: Bragança
- Municipality: Torre de Moncorvo

Area
  - Total: 63.00 km^{2} (24.32 sq mi)

Population (2021)
  - Total: 507
  - Density: 8.05/km^{2} (20.8/sq mi)
- Time zone: UTC+00:00 (WET)
  - Summer (DST): UTC+01:00 (WEST)
- Website: www.freguesiacarvicais.com

Carviçais is a freguesia of the municipality of Torre de Moncorvo in the district of Bragança (Portugal). The population in 2021 was 507, in an area of 63.00 km^{2}. The parish is composed of 7 villages: Carviçais, Macieirinha, Martim Tirado, Quinta da Estrada, Quinta das Pereiras, Quinta das Peladinhas and Quinta da Nogueirinha.

== Demography ==
The population registered in the census is as follows:

Population of the freguesia of Carviçais
Year	Pop.	±%
1864	1,219	—
1878	1,474	+20.9%
1890	1,535	+4.1%
1900	1,583	+3.1%
1911	1,728	+9.2%
1920	1,706	−1.3%
1930	1,825	+7.0%
1940	2,140	+17.3%
1950	2,163	+1.1%
1960	2,255	+4.3%
1970	1,608	−28.7%
1981	1,429	−11.1%
1991	1,157	−19.0%
2001	882	−23.8%
2011	757	−14.2%
2021	507	−33.0%

Population Distribution by Age Group
Age group	0-14	15-24	25-64	> 65
2001	87	92	381	322
2011	52	68	317	320
2021	27	20	192	271

== History and landmarks ==
- Parish Church (Igreja Matriz) of Carviçais
- Capela do Santo Cristo de Carviçais
- Capela de St.ª Bárbara
- Capela do Divino Espírito Santo
- Capela de S. Pedro
- Cruzeiro de Carviçais
- Carviçais railway station

== Transport ==
As the narrow gauge Sabor line (Linha do Sabor) ceased to run in 1988, the closest railway station is now Pocinho in the Douro Line with trains to Tua, Peso da Régua, Livração, Marco de Canaveses, Penafiel, Paredes, Ermesinde (connections to Braga, Guimarães, Viana do Castelo, Rio Tinto and Porto).

The old Carviçais railway station lies abandoned since the closure of the line.
