= Pocinho =

Village in northern Portugal

Coordinates: 41.130718°N 7.122896°W

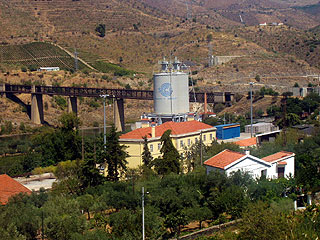
The railway bridge at Pocinho

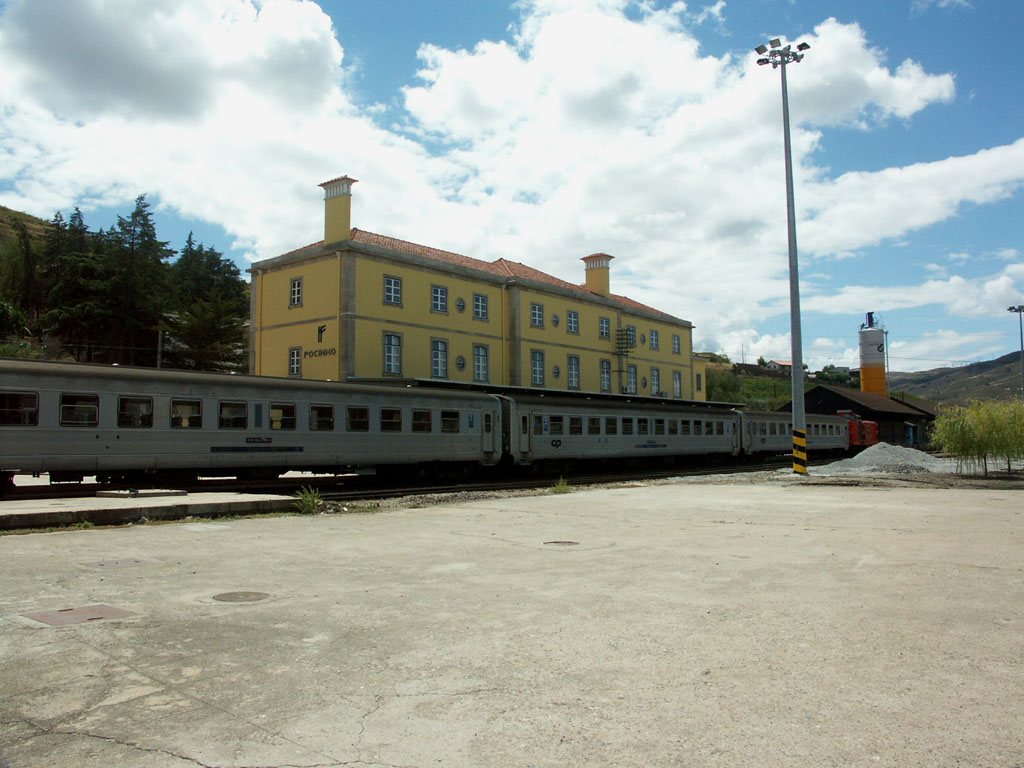
Pocinho railway station

Pocinho is a village in northern Portugal, located in the Vila Nova de Foz Côa Municipality. The Pocinho Dam and the River Douro are nearby.

Pocinho railway station is the eastern terminus of the Douro railway line, so the community developed with the arrival of the railway in 1887. The railway formerly continued eastwards into Spain, but that section closed in 1988.

The Sabor line, a narrow gauge railway, formerly ran north-east from Pocinho over 100 km to Duas Igrejas (near Miranda do Douro). The Sabor line closed in 1988.

The Portuguese journalist, novelist and politician Francisco José Viegas was born in Pocinho on 14 March 1962.
