= Sabor line =

Portuguese closed railway line

The Sabor line (Linha do Sabor)
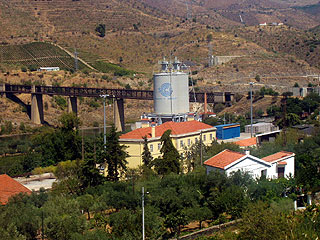
- Pocinho railway station, with railway bridge marking the start of the Sabor line

The Sabor line (Linha do Sabor) was a 1,000 mm (3 ft 3 3/8 in) metre gauge railway in north-east Portugal. It ran for nearly 106 km between Pocinho and Duas Igrejas, near Miranda do Douro. It closed in 1988.

== History ==
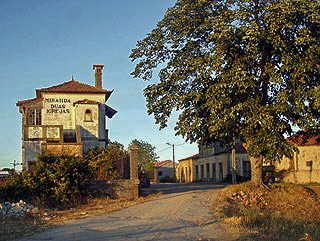
The former northern terminus, Duas Igrejas - Miranda station

The Sabor line served a very rural part of the country, following the Sabor river for part of its route. Construction of the line was partly intended to promote economic development in one of the most economically disadvantaged parts of Portugal, as well as to serve the iron ore mines at Rebordelo. The line was built by CF de Estado (State Railways), but became part of CP in 1947.

In common with the other narrow gauge railways leading from the Douro Valley, the Sabor line was built with metre gauge tracks. Freight trains were operated by steam for almost the entire history of the line (until the early 1980s), whilst passenger trains were mostly operated by small petrol or diesel railcars. 2-4-6-0T Mallet steam locomotives were used on the line, especially for the heavy iron ore freight trains.

The line ran from Pocinho station, which was a junction with the main 1,668 mm (5 ft 5 21/32 in) Iberian gauge Douro railway line through the Douro Valley to Porto. The northern terminus of the line was at Duas Igrejas, a tiny settlement several kilometres from the municipal capital of Miranda do Douro. The line opened from Pocinho to Carviçais in 1917, with extensions to Lagoaça in 1927, Mogadouro in 1930 and eventually reaching Duas Igrejas in 1938. The line was never completed as far as Miranda do Douro. Much of the route was located within a few kilometres of the border with Spain.

The major reason for building the line was freight traffic from the iron ore mines at Rebordelo. The iron ore traffic ceased in 1970, effectively making eventual closure inevitable. By the 1970s passenger services were being regularly replaced by buses. Passenger trains ceased in 1981 and the line closed completely in 1988.

== Minor stops ==
=== Fornos - Sabor stop ===
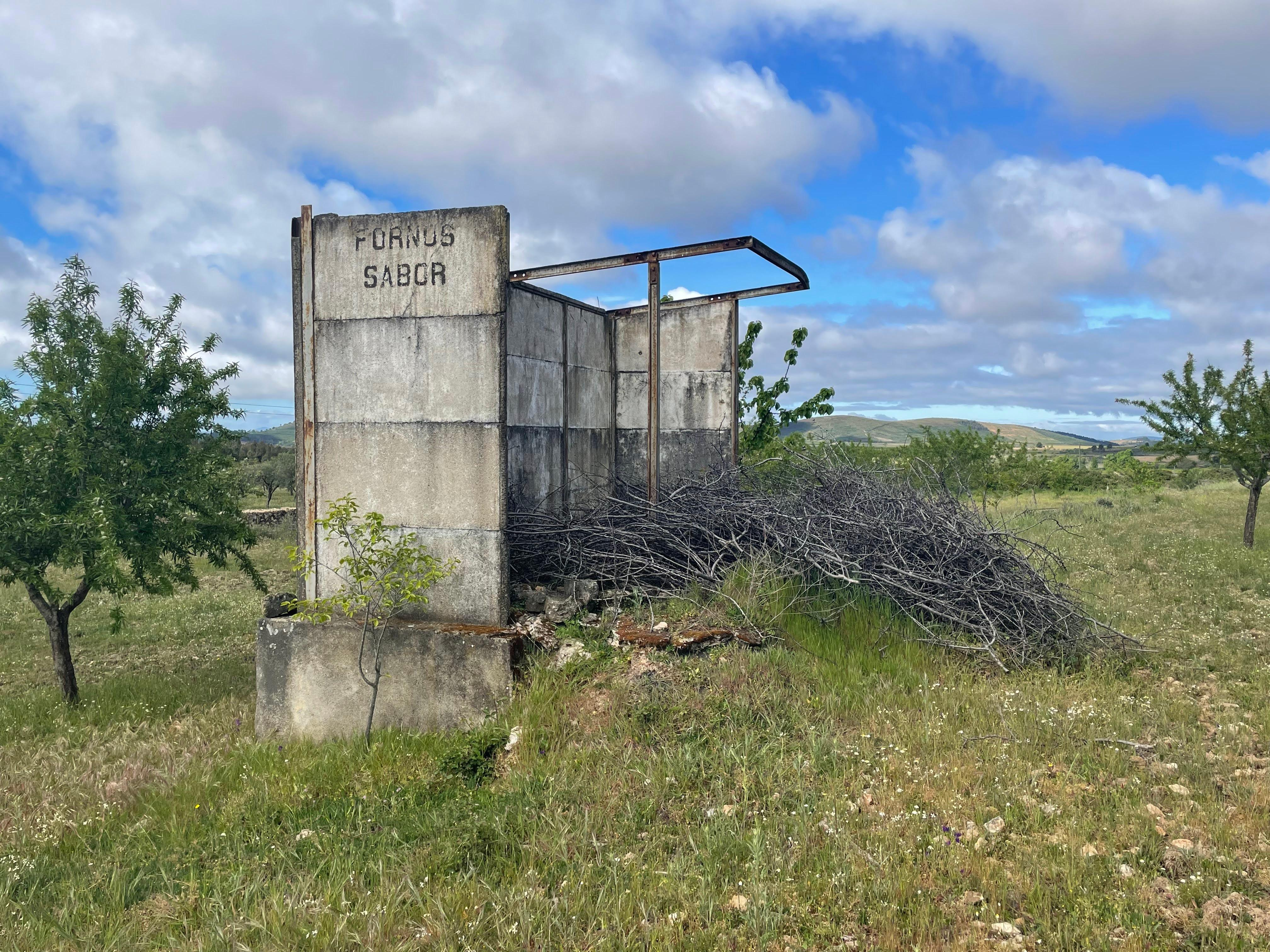
The Fornos - Sabor stop in April 2023.

The Fornos - Sabor Stop (Portuguese: Paragem Fornos-Sabor) was a station on the Sabor line, which served the town of Fornos, in the municipality of Freixo de Espada à Cinta, in Portugal. It had direct connection to the Lagoaça railway station and to the Freixo de Espada à Cinta railway station.

This interface was part of the section of the Sabor Line between the stations of Carviçais and Lagoaça, which entered service on 6 July 1927.

It stands as a modest example of Português Suave architecture, where the initial stop was dismantled to make way for the present structure, a transformation that took place in the 1940s or 1950s.

Rail traffic on the Sabor line ended in 1 August 1988 which consequently led to the closure of the Fornos - Sabor stop.

=== Lamelas halt ===
The Lamelas halt (Portuguese: Apeadeiro de Lamelas) was one of stops of the Sabor line and it was located at the town of Lamelas, in the municipality of Torre de Moncorvo, Portugal. It had direct connection with the Quinta Nova halt and the Zimbro halt.

This halt was located on the section of the Sabor Line between Pocinho and Carviçais, which entered service on 17 September 1911. The line, and consequently the Lamelas halt, was closed in 1 August 1988.

== Other metre gauge railways in the Douro Valley ==
- Corgo line - closed 2009
- Tâmega line - closed 2009
- Tua line - closed 2008

== See also ==
- List of railway lines in Portugal
- List of Portuguese locomotives and railcars
- Rail transport in Portugal
- History of rail transport in Portugal
- Comboios de Portugal

== Bibliography ==
- REIS, Francisco; GOMES, Rosa; Gomes, Gilberto; et al. (2006). Os Caminhos de Ferro Portugueses 1856-2006. Lisboa: CP-Comboios de Portugal e Público-Comunicação Social S. A. p. 238. ISBN 989-619-078-X.
