= Carviçais railway station =

Closed railway station in Carviçais, Portugal

Carviçais railway station Estação Ferroviária de Carviçais
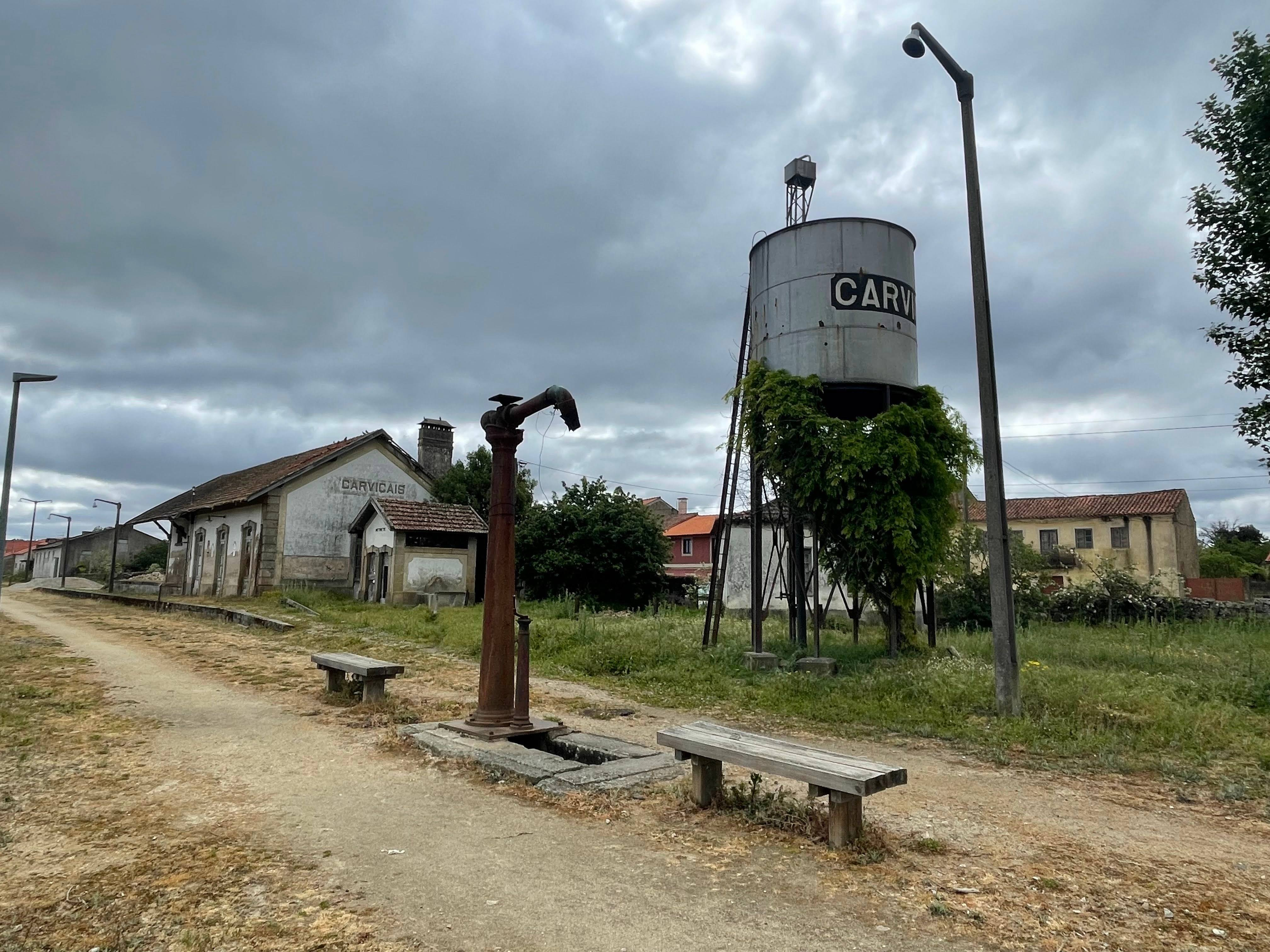
- Carviçais railway station in April 2023

General information
- Location: Carviçais, Torre de Moncorvo; Portugal
- Coordinates: 41°10′58.55″N 6°53′07.99″W
- Line: Sabor line (1911–1988)
- Distance: Pocinho - 33.4km; Mogadouro - 39.2km; Duas Igrejas - Miranda - 71.9km
- Connections: Macieirinha; Fonte do Prado

History
- Opened: 17 September 1911
- Closed: 1 August 1988
Location
- Location within Portugal

The Carviçais railway station, originally called Carviçaes, was a station on the Sabor Line that used to serve the town of Carviçais, in the municipality of Torre de Moncorvo, Portugal.

== Description ==
The Carviçais railway station complex had, in addition to the main building for passenger use (which was located on the south-east side of the track), a warehouse for goods. It also had a wye for reversing locomotives. Traces of the wye can still be seen in an aerial photograph, to the north of the track, about 100 metres east of the main building. Next to the station, on the side of the track, was a barn belonging to the Empresa para Agroalimentação e Cereais.

== History ==
=== Inauguration and active years ===
The section between Pocinho and Carviçais was inaugurated on 17 September 1911, and was the first part of the Sabor line to be opened. The station was inaugurated with the name Carviçaes, later changed to Carviçais due to Orthographic reforms.

In July 1926, it was already planned that the Sabor line would soon be continued from Carviçais. In fact, the next section, to Lagoaça, was opened one year later on 6 July 1927. In 1933, the Ministry of Planning opened the line to the public.

In 1933, the Minister of Public Works and Communications approved an opinion from the General Directorate of Railways, which referred to the choice of land next to the station for the installation of workshops to repair rolling stock. Between 1931 and 1932, 600,000 escudos were earmarked for this project.

=== Closure ===
The Sabor line and the Carviçais railway station were closed on 1 August 1988.

== Bibliography ==
- Reis, Francisco Cardoso dos; Gomes, Rosa Maria; Gomes, Gilberto; et al. (2006). Os Caminhos de Ferro Portugueses 1856-2006. Lisboa: CP-Comboios de Portugal e Público-Comunicação Social S. A. p. 238. ISBN 989-619-078-X.
