= Pocinho railway station =

Railway station in northern Portugal

Pocinho
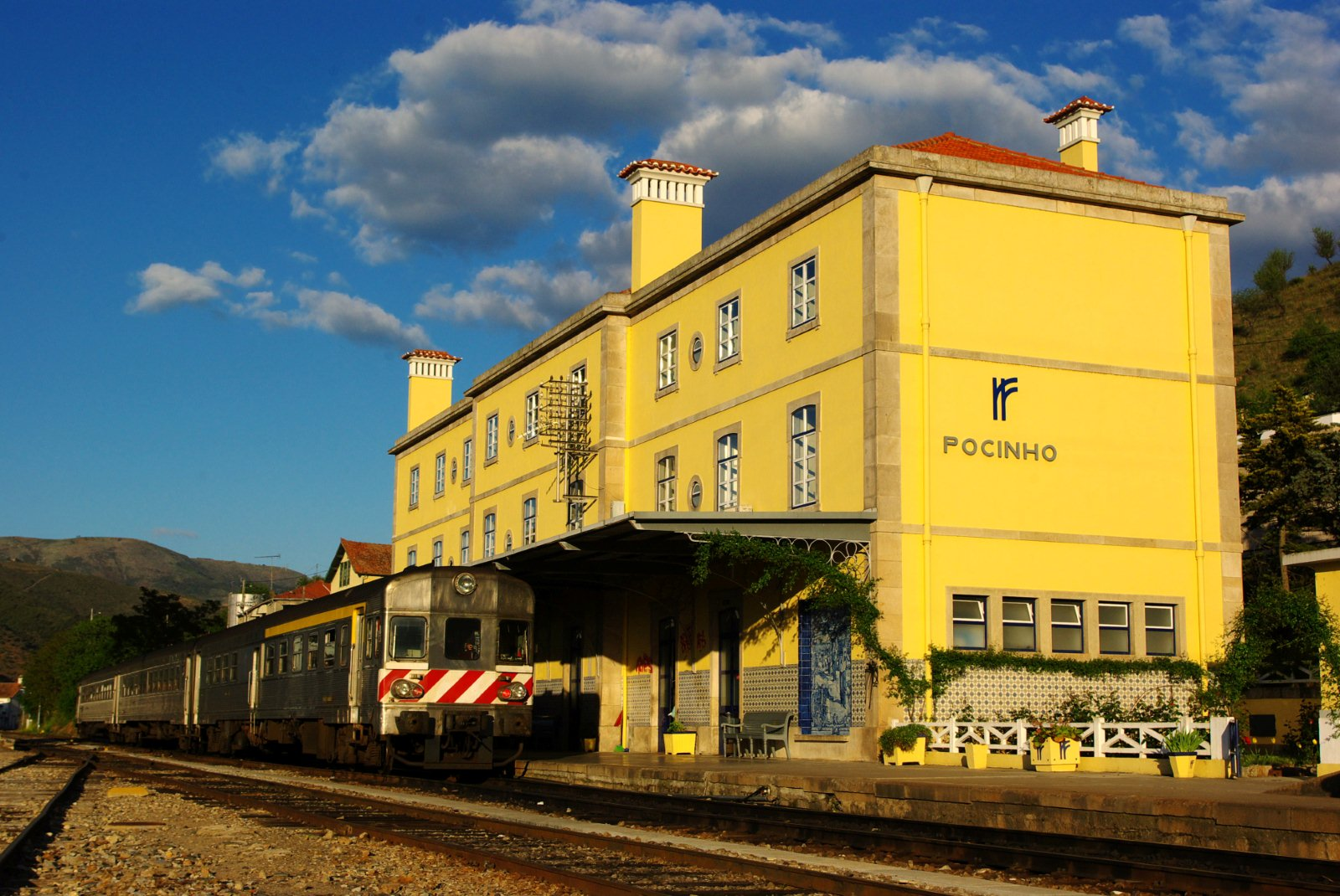
- Main building of Pocinho station, in 2009

General information
- Location: Rua da Estação (PC-5150-502); Pocinho, Vila Nova de Foz Côa; Portugal
- Coordinates: 41°7′49″N 7°7′24″W
- Elevation: 140 m (460 ft)
- Operator: Comboios de Portugal
- Manager: Infraestruturas de Portugal
- Lines: Douro line (1887–present); Sabor line (1911–1988)
- Distance: Douro line; São Bento – 171.5 km (106.6 mi); Régua – 68.2 km (42.4 mi); Sabor line; Mogadouro – 72.6 km (45.1 mi); Duas Igrejas – Miranda – 105.3 km (65.4 mi)
- Platforms: 2
- Tracks: 2
- Connections: Douro line; Tua; Coa; Sabor line; Moncorvo

Other information
- Website: servicos.infraestruturasdeportugal.pt/pt-pt/estacoes?estacaoId=9412005

History
- Opened: 10 January 1887
- Electrified: To be completed by 2028
Location
- Location within Portugal

Pocinho railway station is located on the Iberian gauge Douro line, which serves the town of Pocinho, in the municipality of Vila Nova de Foz Coa, in northern Portugal. It also served as a junction with the Sabor line from its opening in 1911 until its closure in 1988. Since 1988 the station has been the terminus of the Douro Line, following the closure of the section that extended to Barca d'Alva and the Spanish border. There have been calls for this section to be reopened.

== Description ==
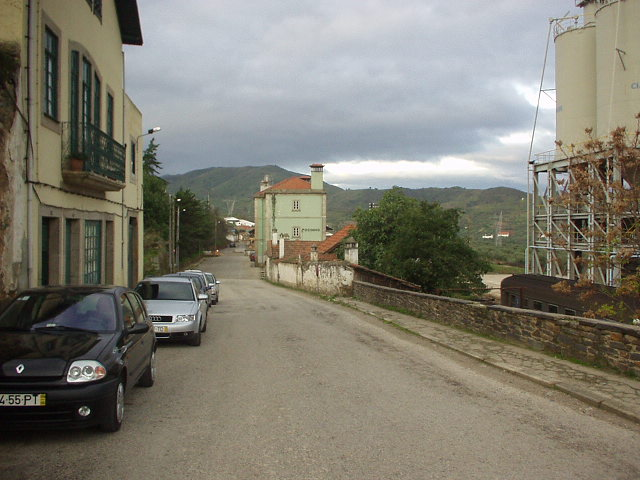
Estação street, 2002

The station is located near the town of Pocinho, with access via Estação street.

In January 2011 it had two tracks, both 817 metres (2,680 ft) long, and two platforms, 139 and 42 metres (138 ft) long and 35 centimetres (14 in) high. The station also had a public information service provided by the Rede Ferroviária Nacional (National Railway Network). The National Railway Network rated the station in 2004 as a class E station, its lowest tier, indicating a small station "with reduced passenger flow", but still higher than a halt. In October 2003, they also provided freight handling, shunting and carriage and wagon cleaning services at the site. In 2007, the station had regular train service. In December of that same year, a commission made up of people from Portugal and Spain was created to fight for the reopening of the link between Pocinho and Barca d'Alva of the Douro line.

The passenger building is located on the south side of the tracks. It contains a number of azulejos, tin glazed ceramic tiles produced by Gilberto Renda and J. Oliveira, showing scenes of daily life in the surrounding region.

The timetable for 2023–2024 shows six trains per day arriving and departing. Trains arrive at irregular intervals from 10:45 until 20:53 and depart at irregular intervals between 7:08 and 19:26.

== History ==
=== 19th century ===
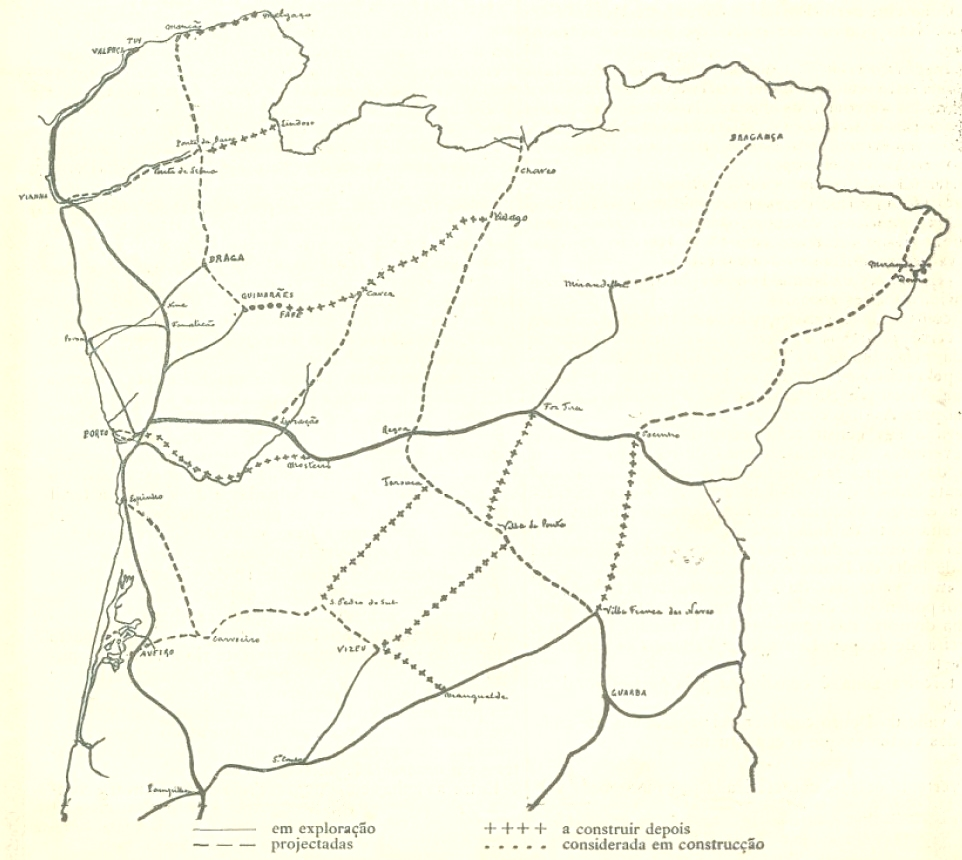
Map of the Complementary Network north of the Mondego River, including the Côa line project. Pocinho station is marked.

The section of the Douro line between Tua and Pocinho was opened for operation on 10 January 1887 and was the provisional terminus of the line until the next section to Côa was completed on 5 May of the same year. The Comboio Presidencial, a train that used to carry the Head of State of Portugal through the Douro line since 1890, had the Pocinho station as its last stop until the 1970s. The project was revived as a tourist attraction by chef Chakall in March 2024 with the objective of “catching the best of the region”.

=== 20th century ===
In the Plan for the Complementary Network to the North of Mondego, outlined in a decree on 15 January 1900, a broad gauge link was planned between Pocinho and Vila Franca das Naves, on the Beira Alta line. This line, together with the Sabor line, had been recommended by the commission responsible for studying the complementary railway network in the north of the country, and was considered to be of great importance, as it would connect the Douro and Trás-os-Montes regions to Beira Alta and the centre of the country. In December 1967, the National Assembly of Portugal enacted Law No. 2133. This legislation facilitated studies concerning railway lines, including the Douro line, and promoted their utilization and exploration.

In 1901 a study by the operator Caminhos de Ferro do Estado (State Railways) noted that this station had road connections with Royal Road No. 9, on both banks of the Douro River. On the north bank, it was also served by a branch of Royal Road No. 38, from Mirandela to Vila Flor, which joined Royal Road No. 9 near the mouth of the Sabor River, and there were plans to build District Road No. 58, which would make it easier for people from the municipality of Alfândega da Fé to access the station.

Pocinho station was one of the stations served by the Porto–Medina train, which ran from the beginning of the 20th century until 1914, connecting the city of Porto to Salamanca and Medina del Campo. The train service resumed in 1919, but was suspended indefinitively shortly afterwards.

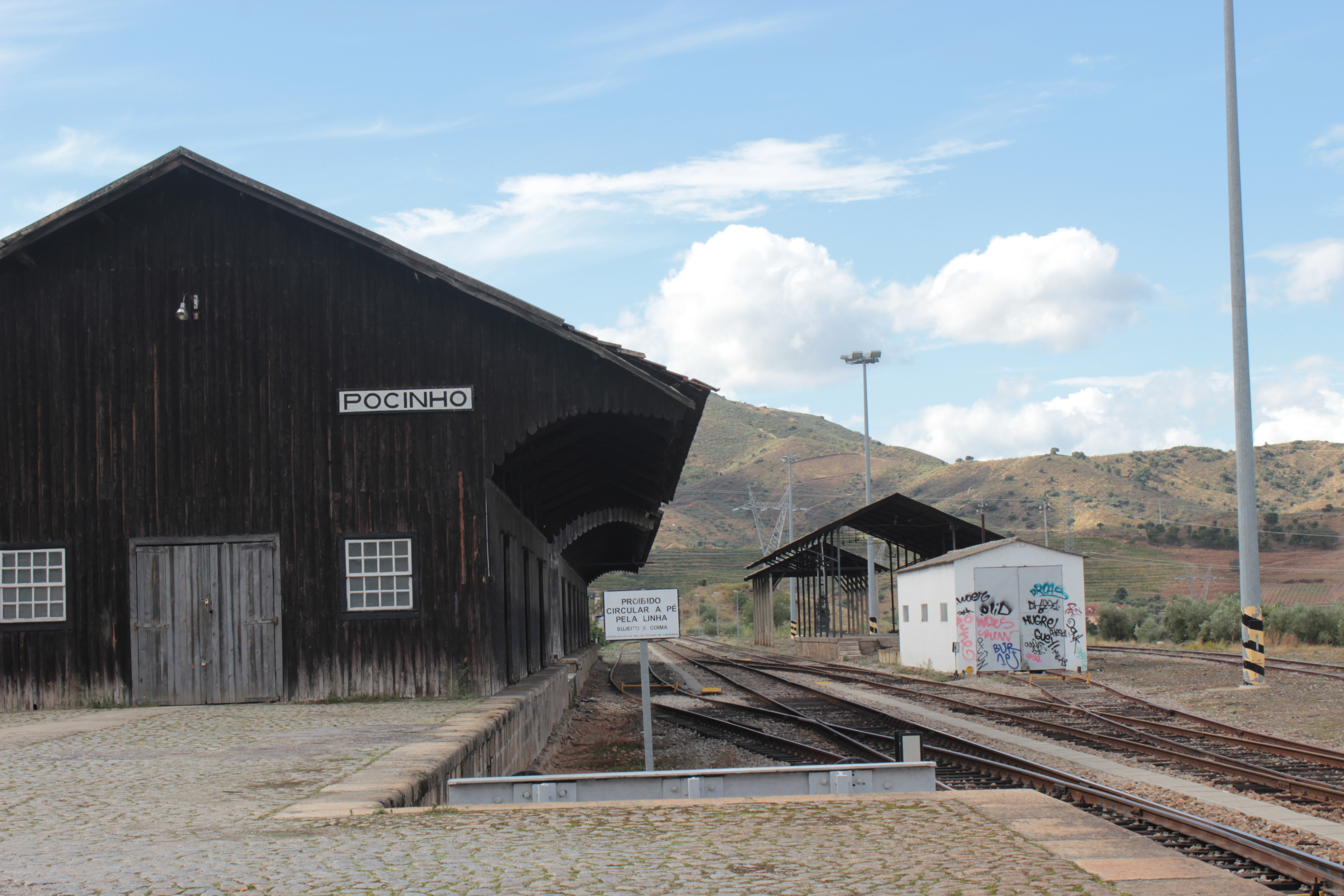
Freight warehouse at Pocinho station

In 1913, Pocinho station was served by stagecoach routes to Vila Nova de Foz Côa, Touça, Fonte Longa, Poço do Canto and Mêda.

When the plan for the network north of the Douro river was revised by decree on 1 April 1930, one of the narrow gauge railways that was listed as still to be built, for which the plans had caused controversy and complaints, was the Côa line from Pocinho to Idanha-a-Nova, which would be about 183 kilometres (114 mi) long. It was also suggested at the time that the Douro Line between Livração and Pocinho should be converted to dual gauge by the addition of a third rail, a project that would connect all the narrow-gauge lines in the Trás-os-Montes region, but would cause major traffic disruption while the work was taking place.

In 1933, the Companhia Nacional de Caminhos de Ferro (National Railway Company) installed a pump on the Douro River to supply water to the station's reservoir. The following year, the Comissão Administrativa do Fundo Especial de Caminhos de Ferro (Administrative Commission of the Special Railway Fund) approved the modification and extension of the tracks, and the Portuguese Railway Company paved the transhipment quay. In 1935, the National Railway Company installed a 20 T weighbridge at this station.

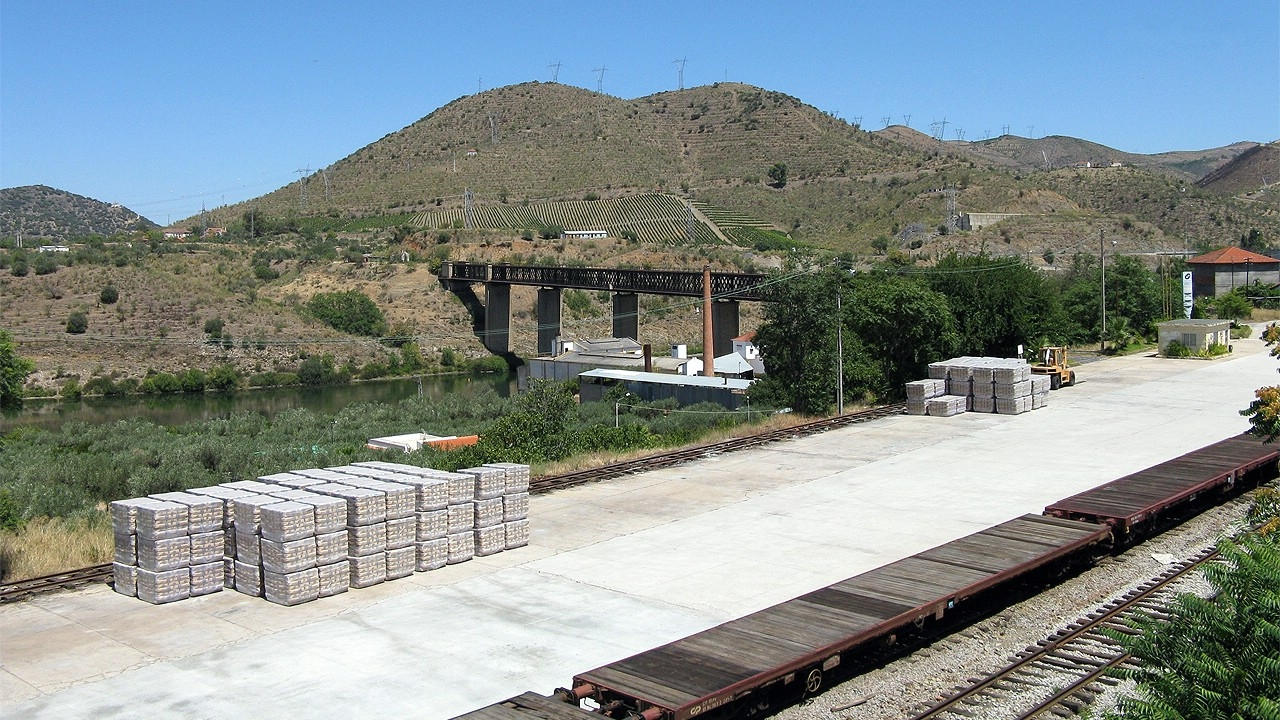
Goods depot at Pocinho station, with the Pocinho Bridge in the background

In 1939, the National Railway Company, who managed the Sabor line, carried out remodelling work on the Traction, Workshop and Movement Services buildings and on the reservoir at Pocinho station.

A decree published in Diário do Governo on 5 March 1953 authorised the expropriation of several plots of land next to Pocinho station, to enable it to be altered and expanded. That year, Pocinho station was served by at least two bus routes, one to Mêda and the other to Viseu via Sernancelhe.

On 16 and 17 May 1995, a government commission made a trip to the northern and central regions of the country to inspect work taking place on the National Road Network. On the first day, the journey between Lisbon and Pocinho was made by train.

=== Connection to the Sabor line ===
On 30 April 1884 the General Council of the District of Bragança sent a representation to the Chamber of Deputies asking for the construction of the lines from Foz Tua to Mirandela and from Pocinho to Miranda do Douro. This request was repeated on 2 July 1890, when the Mirandela Town Council sent a representation to the Chamber of Deputies.

In 1899 the engineer Cachapuz, who represented a company of Italian financiers, asked the state for permission to build several railway lines in Portugal, one of which was from Pocinho to Moncorvo. On 15 August of that year, the Minister of Public Works paid a visit to Pocinho so that later that year a commission to study the Plan for the Complementary Network to the North of the Mondego could be set up. The commission proposed the construction of a new line from Pocinho, which would be used to transport iron ore from Reboredo and alabaster from Vimioso. The line would be broad gauge to avoid the need for transhipment at Pocinho.

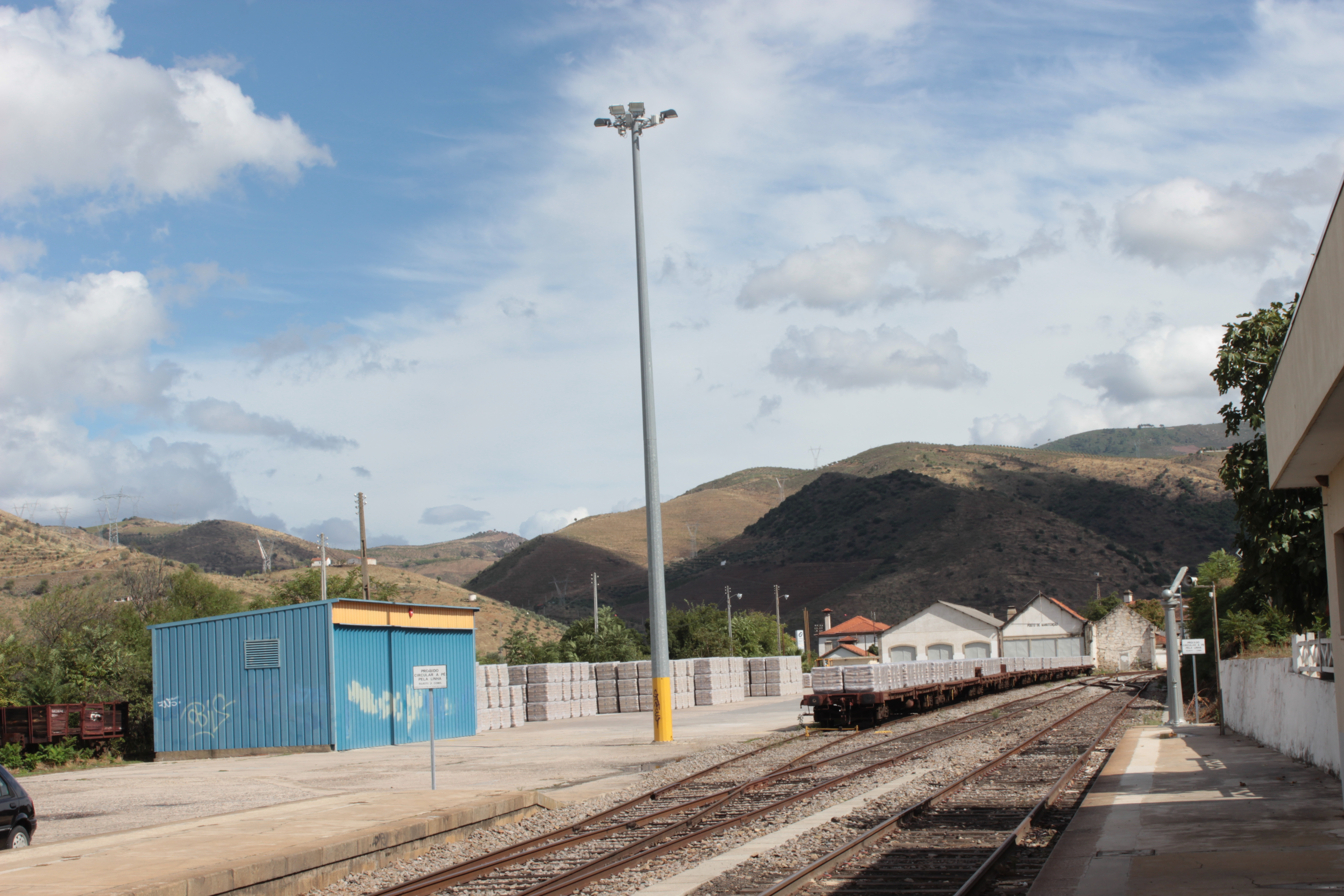
Pocinho station in 2013. The buildings in the centre background were a maintenance depot for narrow gauge rolling stock.

Due to the opposition of the War Council, the project was changed so that the broad gauge section would only go as far as Carviçais, while the rest of the line would be narrow gauge, and this proposal for the line formed part of the Network Plan, published on 15 February 1900. In 1901, Minister Manuel Francisco de Vargas started a tendering process for the construction of the Pocinho Bridge, which was to be used by rail and road, and the contract was signed in 1903. However, due to the great difficulties in building broad gauge railways in the mountainous terrain on the north bank of the River Douro and the ease with which the ore could be transhipped at Pocinho, it was decided that the line could be entirely narrow gauge, with the Pocinho Bridge designed from the outset to allow broad gauge tracks to be laid across it in the future, if the decision was made to widen the gauge of the line.

On 3 October 1903 the design work for the extension of Pocinho to accommodate the new line was completed, which was presented to the Superior Council of Public Works later that month. The changes at Pocinho station were made in order to make it as easy as possible to transfer goods, especially ores and alabaster, from the narrow gauge line to the broad gauge line. In April 1904, the project for the line from Pocinho to Miranda do Douro was approved, and construction began shortly afterwards.

The first section of the Sabor Line, between Pocinho and Carviçais, was completed in early 1911, and services began on 17 September of that year. After 1947, E61 and E41 narrow gauge locomotives shunted at this station.

In the 1950s there was a big increase in traffic on the Sabor line, with two to four ore trains a day from the Reboredo mines to Pocinho, where it was transhipped into broad gauge wagons and then transported to the Port of Leixões, bound for the United Kingdom.

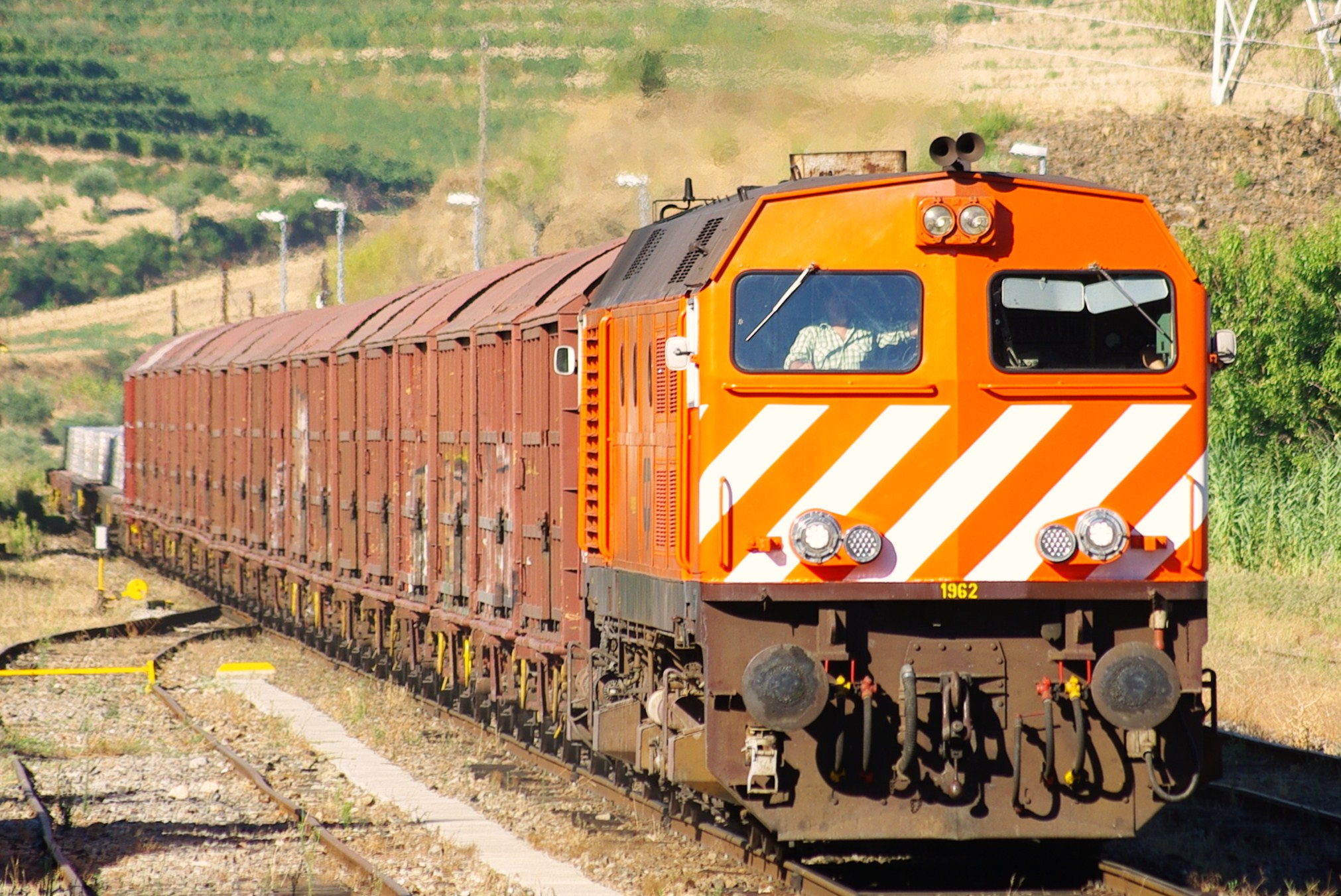
A freight train at Pocinho station in 2010

In 1988, services were withdrawn on the Sabor line and on the section between Pocinho and Barca d'Alva of the Douro line. This decision was taken as part of the government's transport strategy at the time, which favoured the construction of freeways over rail transport.

=== 21st century ===
In 2008, the Northern Region Coordination Commission was looking for private operators to rehabilitate the stretch between Pocinho and Barca d'Alva and use it for tourist trains, hauled by steam locomotives, while the Rede Ferroviária Nacional (National Railway Network) considered that the stretch could be transformed into a greenway.

In November 2009, the section of the Douro line between the stations of Tua and Régua was closed due to adverse weather conditions and the likelihood that fencing would collapse, so a replacement road service was organized between Régua and Pocinho. On 25 December of the same year, a major landslide occurred on the Douro line between Tua and Pocinho stations, interrupting traffic on that section. In February 2010, the Rede Ferroviária Nacional reported that restoration work had already begun and that the section would be reopened at the end of March. In the meantime, passengers were conveyed between the two stations by buses and taxicabs.

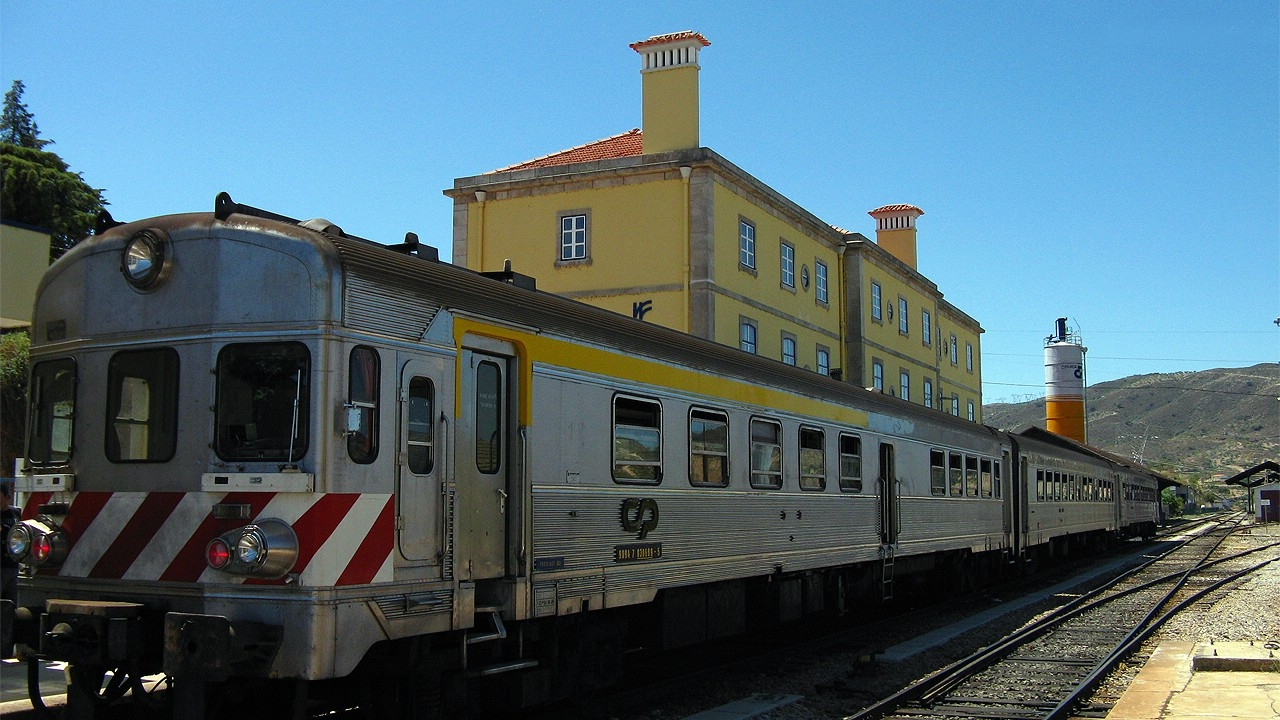
CP Class 0609 operated by Comboios de Portugal at Pocinho station in 2002.

In April 2011, Ricardo Magalhães, the coordinator of the Douro Mission (organisation created to preserve the Alto Douro Wine Region landscape), campaigned for the reopening of the link from Pocinho to Barca d'Alva and the Spanish border, arguing that this would be of great interest from a regional point of view, due to its positive impact on tourism. At the time, the initiative to reopen the line already had the support of the Spanish government and would include local municipalities, the regional administration, promoters of tourism and the wine industry.

In November 2016, the Left Bloc party criticized the poor state of the Douro line and the reduction in services on that route, advocating works on the stations and the electrification of the stretch to Régua, before continuing on to Pocinho and the border. Under the Strategic Transport and Infrastructure Plan, electrification and improved signalling up to Marco de Canaveses should have been completed by 2016. Failure to complete this was picked up by the Ferrovia 2020 plan. On 26 November 2018, the operator Trains of Portugal suspended traffic on the section of the Douro Line between Caíde and Marco de Canaveses, having guaranteed normal train traffic on the remaining section of the line, from that point to Pocinho.

In June 2019, the League of Friends of the Douro World Heritage Site and the Douro Museum Foundation opened a petition for the modernization of the entire Douro Line, including the section from Pocinho to Barca d'Alva. More than thirteen thousand people signed the petition, far more than the four thousand needed to bring the issue to parliament, and it was delivered to the parliament on 9 January 2020.

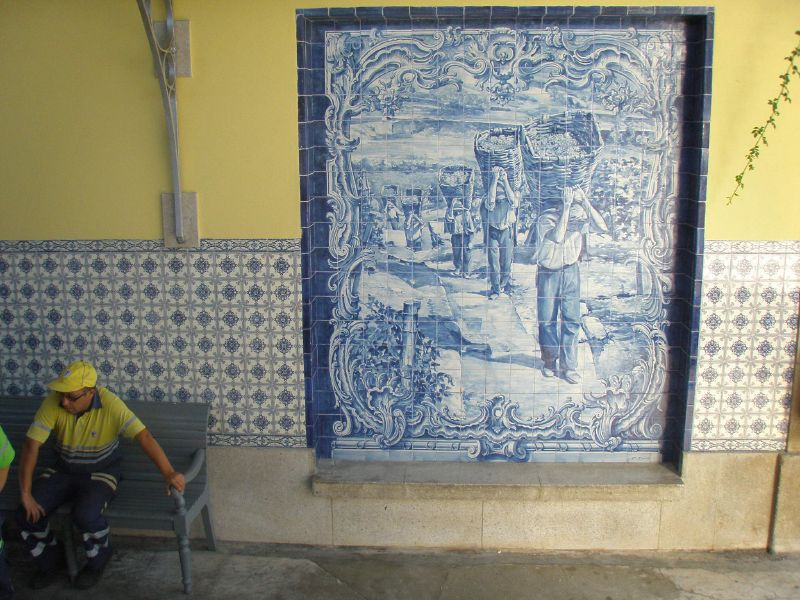
Azulejos at the Pocinho station.

In October 2019, the mayor of Peso da Régua, José Manuel Gonçalves, questioned the company Trains of Portugal about a planned cancellation of Regional and Inter-Regional services on the Douro line, including three daily Inter-Regional trains in each direction between Peso da Régua and Pocinho, and was assured that the operator was not planning to suspend any services on the line. The mayor also asked whether the company was planning to replace the rolling stock and whether stock used during the electrification works would return to service on the line between Marco de Canaveses and Pocinho. The company replied that although various options were being considered, none would be implemented at that time.

== See also ==
- Rail transport in Portugal
- History of rail transport in Portugal

== Bibliography ==
- A Rede Rodoviária Nacional [The National Road Network] (in Portuguese). Lisboa: Junta Autónoma de Estradas. 1995. p. 52.
- Jacob, João Manuel Neto; Alves, Vítor Simões, S. A. e Comissão Nacional para as Comemorações do Centenário da República (2010). Bragança: Roteiros Republicanos [Bragança: Republican Routes] (in Portuguese). Vol. 15. Matosinhos: Quidnovi, Edição e Conteúdos. p. 127. ISBN 978-989-554-722-7.
- Martins, João; Brion, Madalena; Sousa, Miguel; et al. (1996). O Caminho de Ferro Revisitado: O Caminho de Ferro em Portugal de 1856 a 1996 [The Railway Revisited: The Railway in Portugal from 1856 to 1996] (in Portuguese). Lisboa: Caminhos de Ferro Portugueses. p. 446.
- Reis, Francisco; Gomes, Rosa; Gomes, Gilberto; et al. (2006). Os Caminhos de Ferro Portugueses 1856-2006 [Portuguese Railways 1856-2006] (in Portuguese). Lisboa: CP-Comboios de Portugal e Público-Comunicação Social S. A. p. 238. ISBN 989-619-078-X.

== Recommended reading ==
- Abreu, Carlos (2015). A Linha do Vale do Sabor: Um Caminho-de-Ferro Raiano do Pocinho a Zamora [The Sabor Valley Line: A Raiano Railroad from Pocinho to Zamora] (in Portuguese). Valongo: Lema d`Origem. ISBN 9789898342591.
- Antunes, J. A. Aranha; et al. (2010). 1910-2010: O caminho de ferro em Portugal [1910-2010: Railways in Portugal] (in Portuguese). Lisbon: CP-Comboios de Portugal e REFER - Rede Ferroviária Nacional. p. 233. ISBN 978-989-97035-0-6.
- Viegas, Francisco José; Abreu, Maurício (1988). Comboios Portugueses - Um Guia Sentimental [Portuguese Trains - A Sentimental Guide] (in Portuguese). Lisbon: Círculo de Editores.
- Vieira Peixoto de Villas-Boas, Alfredo (2010) [1905]. Caminhos de Ferro Portuguezes [Portuguese Railways] (in Portuguese). Lisbon and Valladollid: Livraria Clássica Editora e Editorial Maxtor. p. 583. ISBN 978-8497618557.
