= Barca d'Alva railway station =

Closed railway station in northern Portugal

Barca d'Alva railway station Estação Ferroviária de Barca d'Alva
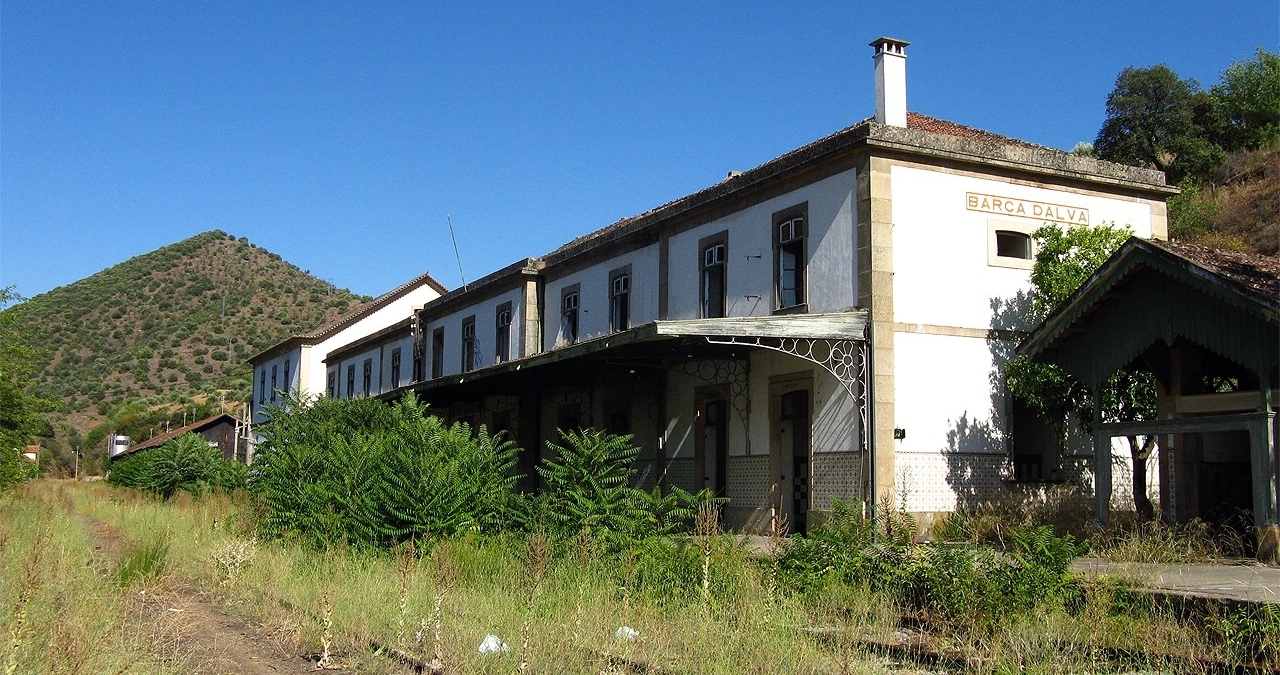
- Barca d'Alva station in 2009

General information
- Other names: Barca de Alva railway station
- Location: Barca d'Alva, Figueira de Castelo Rodrigo; Portugal
- Coordinates: 41°01′37.98″N 6°56′10.83″W
- Lines: Douro line (1887-1988); Barca d'Alva–La Fuente de San Esteban railway (1887-1985)
- Connections: Coa; La Fuente de San Esteban-Boadilla

Other information
- Status: Abandoned

History
- Opened: 9 December 1887; 138 years ago
- Closed: 2 October 1988
Location
- Location within Portugal

Barca d'Alva railway station was the terminal station of the Douro Line, until its closure in 1988. The station used to serve the village of Barca d'Alva and acted as a border station between Portugal and Spain, via the Barca d'Alva–La Fuente de San Esteban railway. It is located in the municipality of Figueira de Castelo Rodrigo, in Portugal.

== History ==
=== 19th century ===
==== Planning ====
The first plans to build a cross-border railway linking the north of the country and Spain were proposed in the mid-19th century, as part of a larger project to construct a commercial port in Leixões. This port would serve the city of Porto and the entire north-western region of the Iberian Peninsula, directly competing with the Port of Vigo. Consequently, a railway line to Galicia was proposed, but later put on hold due to financial difficulties and a shift in priorities towards the Linha do Leste railway line between Lisbon and Badajoz. A revised plan was then projected to connect Porto to Salamanca in Spain, in an attempt to place that city in Porto's area of influence. In 1864, a Luso-Spanish technical commission approved five international railway links between Portugal and Spain, including one between Barca d'Alva and the Spanish towns of La Fregeneda, Vitigudino and Ledesma. Subsequently, it was decided to build another international line from Salamanca to Vilar Formoso, where it would join the Beira Alta line. Originally, both lines were to share the section from Salamanca to Ciudad Rodrigo, but a Spanish Royal Order on 18 August 1880, requested by the Portuguese government, shifted the divergence point to Boadilla.

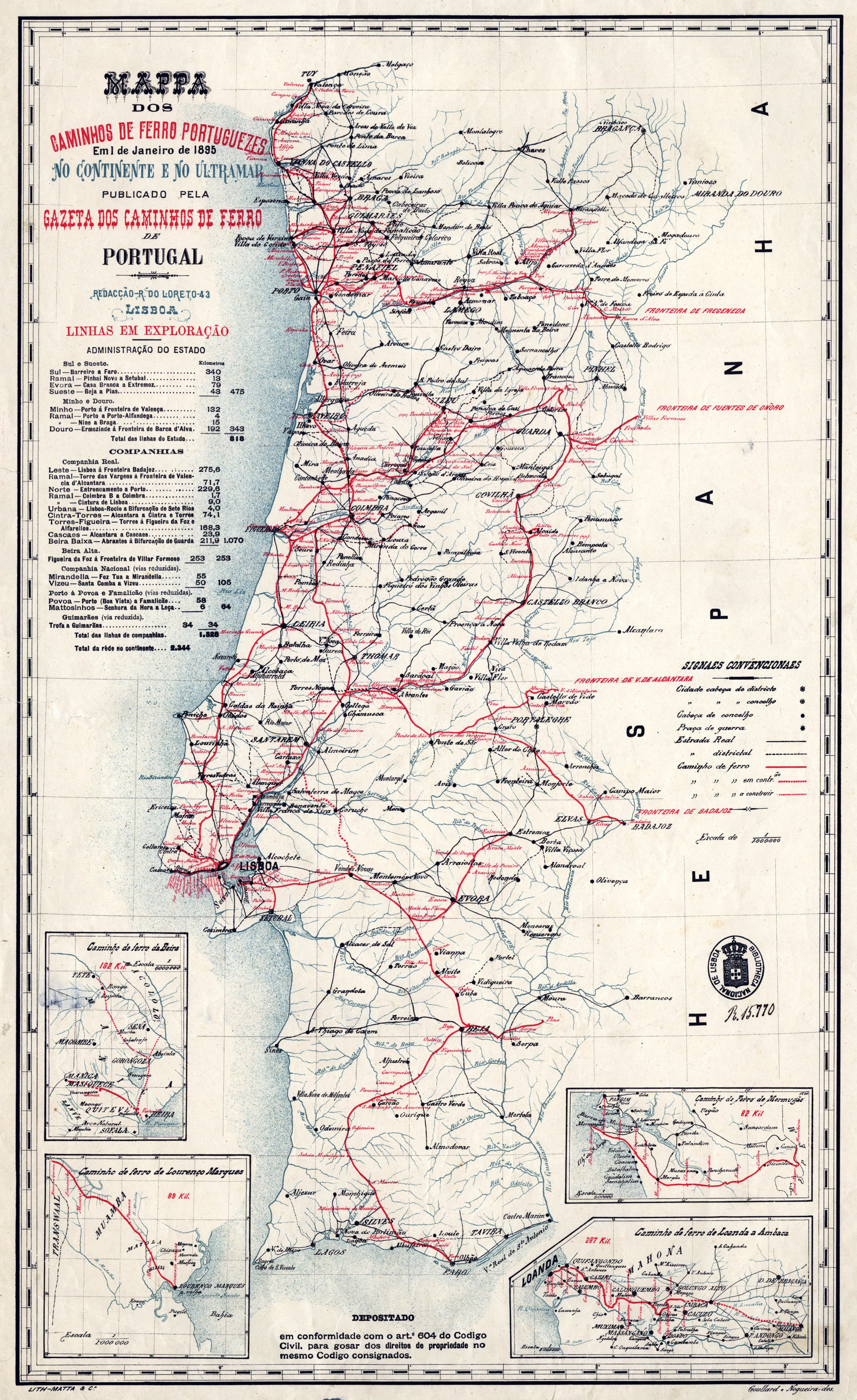
Map of the railways in 1895, including the international link at Barca d'Alva

On 20 May 1881, a Royal Order approved the construction of the section from Vilar Formoso to Salamanca, but left the choice of the junction point open. This provoked protests from Lisbon, leading to a new Royal Order on 3 November 1881 that annulled the previous decision and called for a tender covering both lines. Although the Portuguese state had set a three-year deadline for completion of the works, the Société Financière de Paris, the operator for the Beira Alta line, claimed that construction would require at least five years. The Association of Civil Engineers shared this view and advocated that instead of continuing the Douro Line, a new line should instead be built from Vila Franca das Naves to Régua. This would not only serve the region to the south of the Douro River, but would also create a new crossing over the river, to supplement the Maria Pia Bridge.

However, Porto's political and financial stakeholders strongly opposed completing the connection to Vilar Formoso before the connection to Barca d'Alva, fearing that traffic from Spain would be diverted to the Port of Figueira da Foz, damaging commerce in the city. At the time, an influential engineer and politician stated that "if Porto is not connected with Salamanca at Barca de Alva, the economic conditions of Porto will change in such a way that you will see grass growing in its deserted streets, like in any poor decadent town".

To circumvent a conflict of interest by the Société Financière de Paris, who wished to prioritize the connection to Vilar Formoso, the government proposed the formation of a banking syndicate to finance construction of the line, only transferring its ownership upon completion. Thus, a meeting was called by the Civil Governor and the Porto Syndicate (Sindicato Portuense) was founded on 28 May 1881. It was led by Henrique Burnay and supported by several businessmen and bankers from Porto's commercial sector.

Negotiations with the Société Financière de Paris proved complex, and on 15 June 1881 a Royal Order was issued announcing the opening of the tender and outlining its conditions. The first article stated that "the concessionary company is obliged to carry out, at its own cost and risk, all the work necessary for the construction of a railway which, starting from Salamanca and branching at Boadilla, shall proceed toward the Portuguese border via Ciudad Rodrigo to connect with the Portuguese Beira Alta railway, and to another point on the same border at Barca d'Alva, connecting there with the Portuguese Douro line”. The tender was opened on 12 September and Porto Syndicate submitted the sole bid. As a result, the contract was awarded to them by Royal Order on 23 September 1881.

On 4 October 1881, the syndicate requested the interest guarantee (a government commitment to cover shortfalls in investment returns) to be extended to the stretch between Boadilla and Vilar Formoso, a proposal that sparked heated debate in parliament. Supporters, led by deputy Correia de Barros, argued that both lines would experience high traffic and that the resulting increase in use of the Douro line would relieve the public treasury of its obligations by 1902. Opponents, especially the deputy António Augusto de Aguiar, criticised the very high costs of the works up to Barca d'Alva, contended that the proposed deadlines were unrealistic, and again advocated for a connection between the Douro and Beira Alta lines, previously presented by the Association of Civil Engineers. Despite the opposition, the request was approved on 22 July 1882, and the contract with the syndicate was signed on 12 October 1882.

On 21 February 1883, the company presented a new study for the stretch from Boadilla to Barca d'Alva, which was approved by a Royal Order on 16 August 1883. After challenging negotiations over the construction of the Águeda River Bridge, the project for the last 2 kilometres (1.2 mi) from Boadilla to Barca de Alva was authorised by a Royal Order on 28 April 1885. Meanwhile, in January 1885, the syndicate created a company in Spain, the Railway Company from Salamanca to the Portuguese Border (Compañía del Ferrocarril de Salamanca a la Frontera Portuguesa), which would be supported by the Portuguese and Spanish governments and would be responsible for building and operating the lines in Spain.

==== Inauguration ====
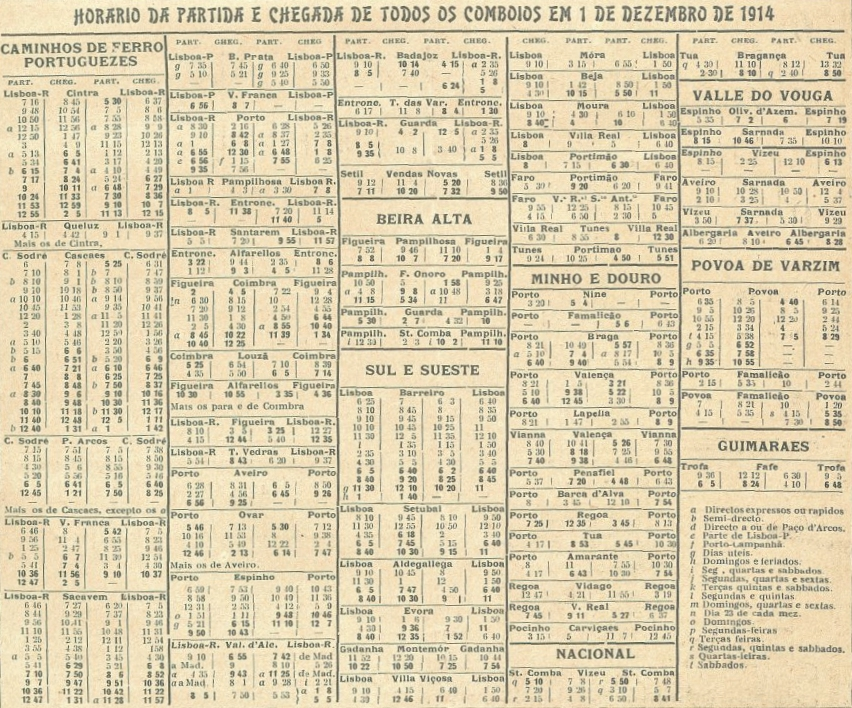
Timetables of all trains in Portugal in December 1914. Barca d'Alva was served by only two trains, one in each direction

On the Spanish side, the section to Vilar Formoso was opened on 5 June 1886, while the branch to Barca d'Alva reached Lumbrales on 25 July 1887 and was completed on 6 December of that year. On the Portuguese side, the section from Tua to Pocinho opened for operation on 10 January 1887, and the line reached Côa on 5 May. Construction of the final stretch from Pocinho to Barca d'Alva was completed on 2 December, and the section entered service on 9 December, along with the international link to Salamanca.

It took around six years for both sides to reach Barca d'Alva, longer than the three years originally planned by the Portuguese state and the five years that had been considered necessary by the Société Financière de Paris. These delays led to repeated recourse to credit in Paris, obtained under increasingly unfavourable terms and mostly through the influence of the Portuguese government. In the first years of operation, revenue from the lines proved too low to cover expenses, leading to the bankruptcy of Porto Syndicate. It was replaced by the Porto Docks and Peninsular Railways Company (Companhia das Docas do Porto e dos Caminhos de Ferro Peninsulares), formed in 1889. However, this transition faced opposition from the Spanish government, which ultimately succeeded in making the Railway Company from Salamanca to the Portuguese Border independent.

=== 20th century ===
In the first half of the 20th century, the restaurant at Barca d'Alva station became famous for the quality of its service, under the direction of Germano Mielgo.

==== 1900s and 1910s ====
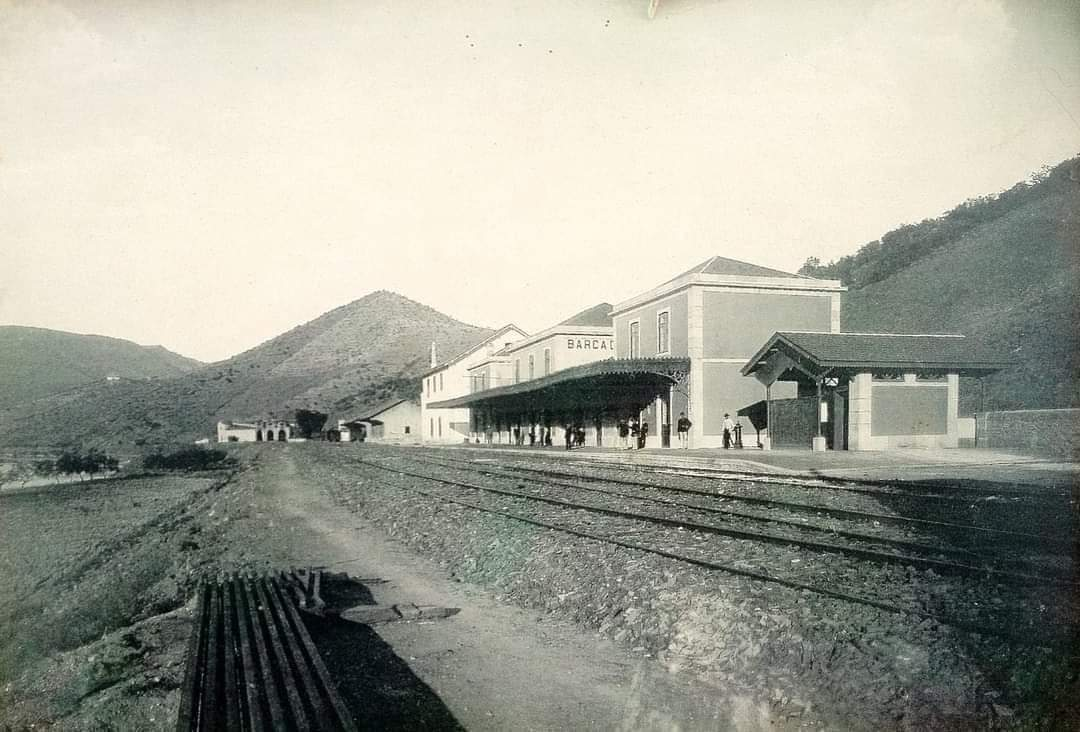
Barca d'Alva station in its early years

As of 1901, the road infrastructure connecting to Barca d'Alva station was still being developed, and crossing the Douro River was only possible by boat. To the south, sections of the National Road 221, then known as Royal Road no. 53, remained under construction between Pinhel and Escalhão. The completion of these links was considered important for improving access to the Douro line from regions that otherwise relied on the Beira Alta line. On the north bank, 5 kilometres (3.1 mi) of road had been completed between the Douro and Freixo de Espada à Cinta, with another 12 kilometres (7.5 mi) still in the planning stage. By 1905, funding was approved for the repair and improvement of this road.

At the end of 1901, the director of the Minho and Douro division of the Portuguese State Railways announced the introduction of first-class carriages on services between this station and Porto. Later, in January 1905, an agreement was approved between the Spanish and Portuguese operators to coordinate train connections at Barca d'Alva.

Starting in 1904, the Portuguese State Railways organised a fast train from Porto to Medina del Campo, passing through Barca d'Alva, where part of its rolling stock was left. However, this train usually ran almost empty from Régua onwards due to the lack of road connections to the stations beyond that point. This service, which operated three times a week in each direction, was suspended in 1914 due to the outbreak of the First World War, resumed in 1919, and was definitively cancelled shortly afterwards due to fuel shortages and the outbreak of the Spanish Civil War.

By 1913, Barca d'Alva station was served by several stagecoach routes that went to Almeida, Castelo Rodrigo, Escalhão, Figueira de Castelo Rodrigo, Pinhel, Reigada and Vilar Torpim. Later, the service between Barca d'Alva and Figueira de Castelo Rodrigo was replaced by a bus route.

==== 1920s and 1930s ====
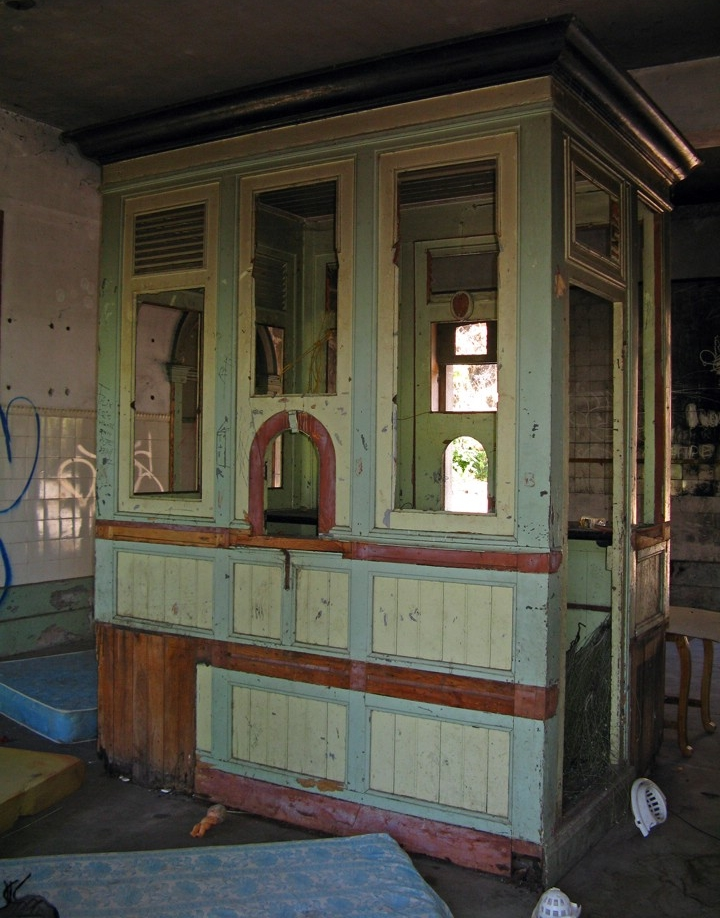
Old ticket booth inside Barca d'Alva station, 2009

On 12 July 1924, a Royal Order restructured the Spanish railway network, grouping operators into larger companies. Among them was the Railway Company from Salamanca to the Portuguese Border, which was integrated into the Compañía Nacional de los Ferrocarriles del Oeste, which itself would later be incorporated into RENFE.

In 1933, the Portuguese Railway Company carried out various repairs and improvements to the station's passenger building, and further repairs were made in 1934. In 1937, trains 751 and 752 were introduced from Porto to Salamanca, which ran three times a week in each direction, with a journey time from Porto to Barca d'Alva of just over 4 hours. These services were interrupted by the outbreak of World War II. In 1939, the border crossing near Barca d'Alva was reopened, and services were restarted between Porto and Salamanca.

==== 1950s and 1960s ====
The Portuguese Railway Gazette reported that international trains would be re-introduced on the line on 14 May 1950, and that the Portuguese Railway Company and RENFE were planning to run carriages from Porto to La Fuente de San Esteban, to avoid the need for transhipment at Barca d'Alva.

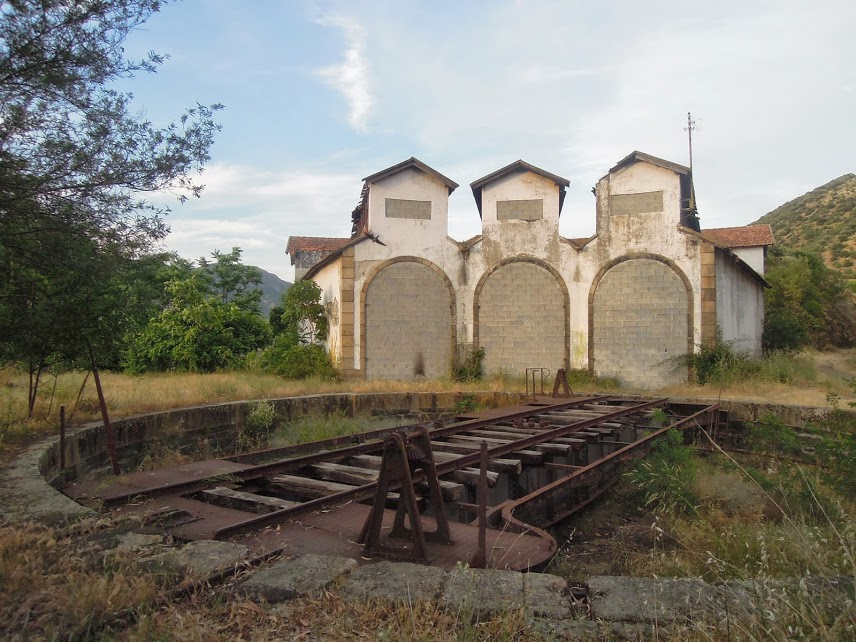
Former roundabout and station carriage house, in 2014

In the mid-1950s, the Almirante Sarmento Rodrigues Bridge next to Barca d'Alva was completed, improving road access to the station. Before the bridge was built, the Douro was crossed by boat. One of the regular users of this system was the writer Guerra Junqueiro, who would take the train to Barca d'Alva and then cross the river to his estate on the other bank, the Quinta da Batoca. With the opening of the bridge, Barca d'Alva could easily be reached from Torre de Moncorvo and Freixo de Espada à Cinta.

In 1956, changes to the Spanish train timetables significantly impacted traffic at Barca d'Alva. The direct connections between national and international trains were discontinued, forcing passengers to either spend the night at the station or travel by road to Vilar Formoso, where they could board the Sud Express. This shift coincided with substantial Spanish government investments in the Vilar Formoso line, including upgrades for higher-speed trains and the expansion of Fuentes de Oñoro, the nearby Spanish border town.

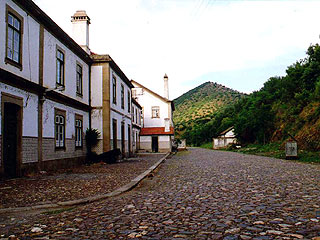
Barca d'Alva station, seen from the street, in 1995

In the 1960s, direct services from Porto to Salamanca were resumed, using CP Class 0400 railcars.

==== Decline and closure ====
The Douro Line and its international extension never achieved the level of traffic that had been anticipated, either nationally or internationally, and it also failed to divert goods from the Salamanca plateau to the Port of Leixões. In addition, the border line had a large number of metal bridges, which would be costly to replace. These factors combined made the closure of the international section foreseeable as early as the mid-20th century. At the time, there was already support for keeping the line in Portugal, due to its potential as a tourist destination, together with the promotion of Port wine.

In 1979, RENFE operated a Ferrobus railcar service between Barca d'Alva and La Fuente de San Esteban.

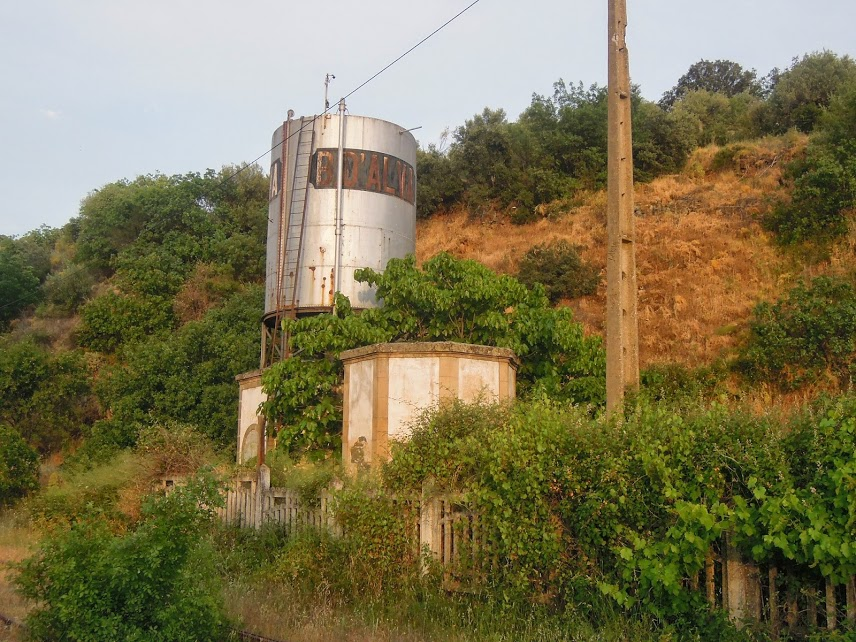
Former water tower, in 2014

In 1984, the Spanish state decided to close the section between La Fuente de San Esteban and La Fregeneda, leaving the international section between La Fregeneda and Barca d'Alva without any services. The closure took place on 1 January 1985.

In 1988, the section between Pocinho and Barca d'Alva was closed. The station closed on 18 October 1988.

=== 21st Century ===
In 2006, the Salamanca-based cultural association Camino de Hierro was planning to restore the line between Fuente de San Esteban and Barca d'Alva for tourism purposes. The estimated cost of the project was around 24 million euros, to be used for safety upgrades and the refurbishment of tracks and stations. That institution also considered reopening the section to Pocinho, so that tourist trains could connect to cruises coming from Porto.

In September 2008, Via Libre magazine reported that the Coordination Commission for the Northern Region of Portugal was looking for investors for steam-powered tourist trains on the route between Pocinho and Barca d'Alva, a project that would cost around 600,000 euros. On the other hand, the National Railway Network, which at the time managed the railway infrastructure in Portugal, was planning to turn that section into a greenway.

On 9 January 2020, a delegation led by Luís Pedro Martins, president of Tourism in Porto and the North of Portugal, delivered a petition to the Portuguese Parliament calling for the entire Douro Line to be refurbished and for the section to the Spanish border to be reopened. Martins argued that this measure would bring great benefits to tourism, as it would allow visitors to better explore the region. It would be a major investment in an inland area of the country, challenging the tendency to invest in developments on the coastal strip, and would be part of a major strategy to promote the Douro Wine Region as a World Heritage Site. The delegation also included representatives from the municipalities of Peso da Régua, Torre de Moncorvo and Sabrosa and the Douro Intermunicipal Community, as well as representatives from the League of Friends of the Douro World Heritage Site, of the Douro Museum Foundation and other organisations from the north of the country. Later that month, Minister of Infrastructure and Housing Pedro Nuno Santos gave an interview to Público, where he discussed plans for a national railway strategy. This would include the reopening and modernisation of several closed railway sections, such as the Pocinho–Barca d'Alva line, which would be electrified.

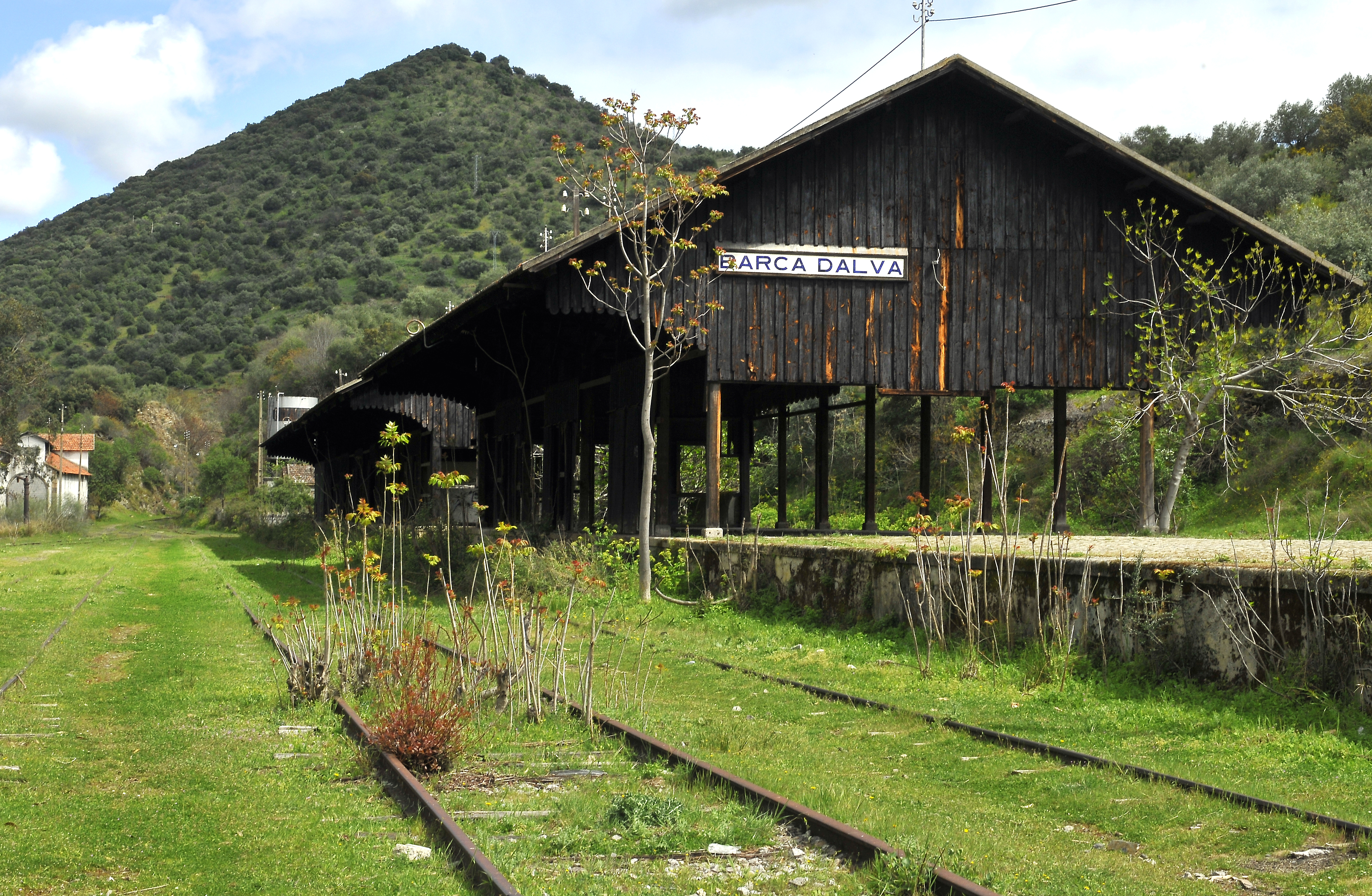
The station's former goods yard, in 2014

== Literary references ==
The station appears in the book The City and the Mountains, by Eça de Queirós:

It was a very cosy station, very clean, with white roses climbing up the walls and other rose bushes in a garden, where a tank muffled with slimes slept under two flowering mimosas that were blooming. A pale young man in a honey-coloured paletot, leaning his walking stick against the ground, gazed thoughtfully at the train.

== See also ==
- Barca d'Alva
- Douro Line
- Barca d'Alva–La Fuente de San Esteban railway
- Comboios de Portugal
- Infraestruturas de Portugal
- Rail transport in Portugal
- History of rail transport in Portugal

== Bibliography ==
- Martins, João; Brion, Madalena; Sousa, Miguel; et al. (1996). O Caminho de Ferro Revisitado: O Caminho de Ferro em Portugal de 1856 a 1996 [The Railway Revisited: The Railway in Portugal from 1856 to 1996]. Lisbon: Caminhos de Ferro Portugueses. p. 446.
- Queiroz, José Maria Eça de (1901). A Cidade e as Serras [The City and the Mountains]. Lisbon: Livros do Brasil. p. 253.
- Reis, Francisco; Gomes, Rosa; Gomes, Gilberto; et al. (2006). Os Caminhos de Ferro Portugueses 1856-2006 [Portuguese Railways 1856-2006]. CP-Comboios de Portugal e Público-Comunicação Social S. A. p. 238. ISBN 989-619-078-X.

== Recommended reading ==
- Antunes, J. A. Aranha; et al. (2010). 1910-2010: o caminho de ferro em Portugal [1910-2010: railways in Portugal]. Lisbon: CP-Comboios de Portugal e REFER - Rede Ferroviária Nacional. p. 233. ISBN 978-989-97035-0-6.
- Castro, Francisco Almeida; Cerveira, Augusto (2006). Material e tracção: os caminhos de ferro portugueses nos anos 1940-70 [Material and traction: Portuguese railways in 1940-70]. Para a História do Caminho de Ferro em Portugal. Vol. 5. Lisbon: CP-Comboios de Portugal. p. 270. ISBN 989-95182-0-4.
- Villas-Boas, Alfredo Vieira Peixoto de (2010) [1905]. Caminhos de Ferro Portuguezes [Portuguese Railways]. Lisbon and Valladollid: Livraria Clássica Editora e Editorial Maxtor. p. 583. ISBN 978-8497618557.
- Vasconcelos, António; Santo, Jorge Zúniga; et al. (2008). Pontes dos Rios Douro e Tejo [Bridges over the Douro and Tagus Rivers]. Lisbon: Ingenium. p. 129. ISBN 978-989-8149-02-2.
