= Santo Isidoro =

Santo Isidoro may refer to:

- Santo Isidoro, Marco de Canaveses, a former civil parish in the Porto District, northern Portugal.
- Santo Isidoro, Mafra, a civil parish in the Lisbon District, central Portugal.
- Santo Isidoro e Livração, a civil parish in the Porto District formed by the merger of the former parishes Toutosa and Santo Isidoro.
