= La Fuente de San Esteban-Boadilla railway station =

Railway station in La Fuente de San Esteban, Spain

La Fuente de San Esteban-Boadilla railway station Estación de La Fuente de San Esteban-Boadilla
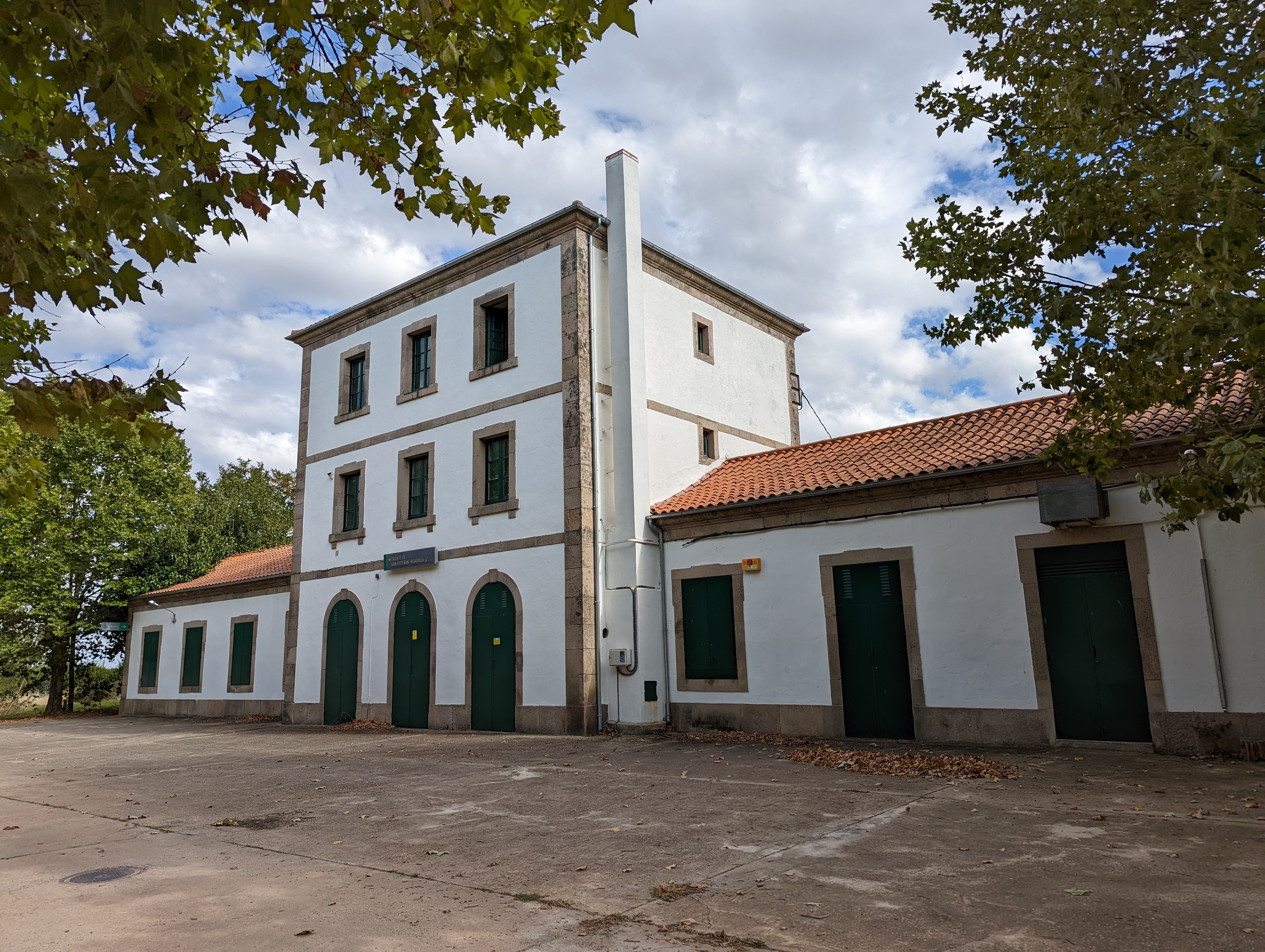
- La Fuente de San Esteban-Boadilla station in 2022

General information
- Location: La Fuente de San Esteban; Spain
- Coordinates: 40°47′35.34″N 6°14′54.18″W
- Lines: Medina del Campo-Vilar Formoso line (1886-present); Barca d'Alva–La Fuente de San Esteban railway (1887-1985)

Other information
- Station code: 33008

History
- Opened: 25 May 1886; 140 years ago
Location
- Location within Spain

La Fuente de San Esteban-Boadilla is a railway station located in the Spanish municipality of La Fuente de San Esteban, in the province of Salamanca, autonomous community of Castilla y León. It has no passenger services, although it can be used as a switch for crossing trains. Historically, the La Fuente de San Esteban-Boadilla station was a railway junction of some importance, where the Medina del Campo-Vilar Formoso and Barca d'Alva–La Fuente de San Esteban lines converged, both of international character. As a result, it had considerable passenger and freight rail traffic, as well as a number of large-scale facilities. The closure of the line to Barca d'Alva in 1985 meant that the station lost its importance, the situation got worse when the Barca d'Alva railway station closed in 1988.

== Location ==
The station is located at kilometre point 58.1 of the Iberian gauge railway line Medina del Campo-Vilar Formoso, at an altitude of 776 metres above sea level. The kilometre corresponds to the historic route of the Salamanca-Vilar Formoso railway.

It was also the terminus of the Barca d'Alva–La Fuente de San Esteban line, now closed.

== History ==
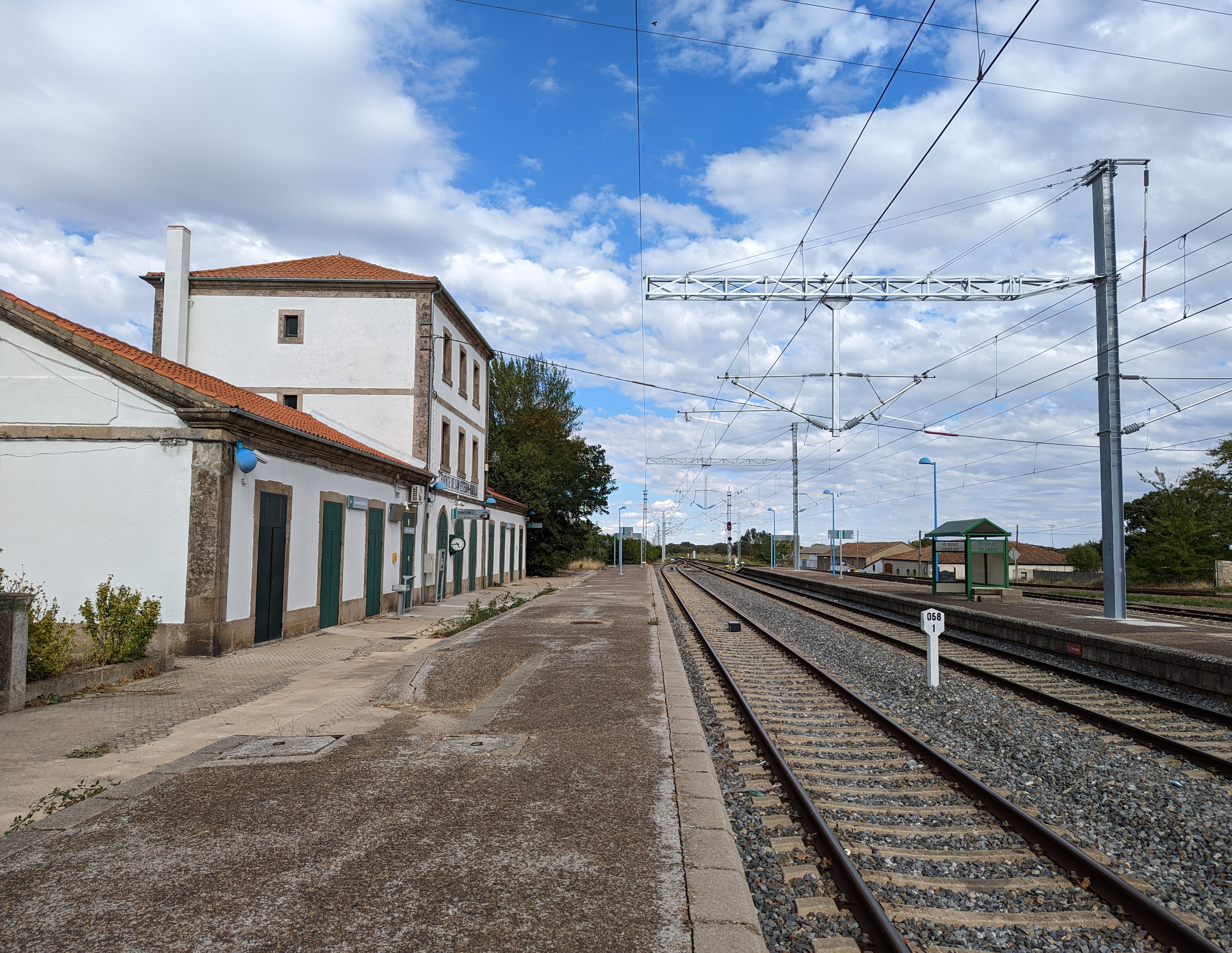
View in 2022

The station was opened to traffic on 25 May 1886 with the opening of the Salamanca-Vilar Formoso section of the line that was intended to link Salamanca with the Portuguese border. Its construction was the work of the Compañía del Ferrocarril de Salamanca a la frontera de Portugal, a company that was set up to extend the railway from Salamanca to link up with the Portuguese railways at Barca d'Alva to the north, and Vilar Formoso, to the south. The section between La Fuente de San Esteban and Barca d'Alva was opened to traffic on 8 December 1887, which turned the station into a railway junction.

As a consequence of its strategic position, La Fuente de San Esteban-Boadilla station had an important railway traffic and became a stop for international trains. Such trains, like the Sud Express, (Note: The Sud Express had started its services in 1887, passing through France, Spain and Portugal.) ran the Paris-Lisbon route via Salamanca and La Fuente de San Esteban without ever passing through Madrid.

In 1928 the facilities passed into the hands of the Compañía Nacional de los Ferrocarriles del Oeste, a situation that continued until 1941, after the nationalisation of all the Iberian gauge railways, when they were transferred to the recently created RENFE. On 1 January 1985 the La Fuente de San Esteban-Barca d'Alva line was closed to traffic due to its low economic profitability, which meant that the station La Fuente de San Esteban-Boadilla station lost its importance and its status as a railway junction.

Since January 2005, Adif is the owner of the railway facilities, while Renfe Operadora operates the line.

== Bibliography ==
- REIS, Francisco; GOMES, Rosa; GOMES, Gilberto; et al. (2006). Os Caminhos de Ferro Portugueses 1856-2006. CP-Comboios de Portugal e Público-Comunicação Social S. A. p. 238. ISBN 989-619-078-X.
- García Raya, Joaquín (2006). "Cronología básica del ferrocarril español de vía ancha" (PDF). IV Congreso Historia Ferroviaria: Málaga, septiembre de 2006. Consejería de Obras Públicas y Transportes de la Junta de Andalucía.
- Ruiz Morales, José Miguel (1946). La economía del bloque hispanoportugués. Madrid: Instituto de Estudios Políticos.
- Sánchez Vicente, David (2010). Arribes del Duero. Una visión interdisciplinar. En: VV.AA. Salamanca: Eds. Universidad de Salamanca. ISBN 9788478001620.
- Wais, Francisco (1974). Historia de los ferrocarriles españoles. Madrid: Editora Nacional.
- Williamson-Serra, Herbert William (1955). The Tourist Guide-book of Spain. The Green Guides.
