= Coa halt =

Closed halt in northern Portugal

Coa halt Apeadeiro de Coa
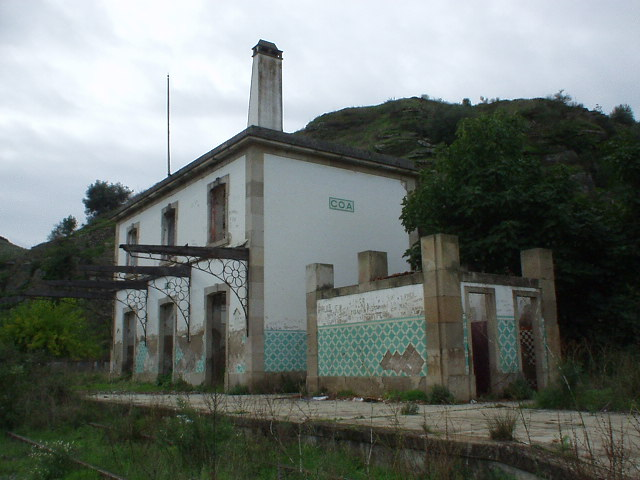
- Coa halt in 2002

General information
- Other names: Côa halt
- Location: Vila Nova de Foz Côa; Portugal
- Coordinates: 41°5′1.68″N 7°6′19.29″W
- Elevation: 140 m (460 ft)
- Line: Douro line (1887–1988)
- Connections: Pocinho; Barca d'Alva

History
- Opened: 5 May 1887
- Closed: 2 October 1988
Location
- Location within Portugal

The Coa halt (name previously spelled as Côa, changed after the halt's closure), is a closed interface of the Douro line, which used to serve the town of Vila Nova de Foz Côa, in the Guarda District, in Portugal. The halt started operating on 5 May 1887, and was closed on 2 October 1988.

== Description ==
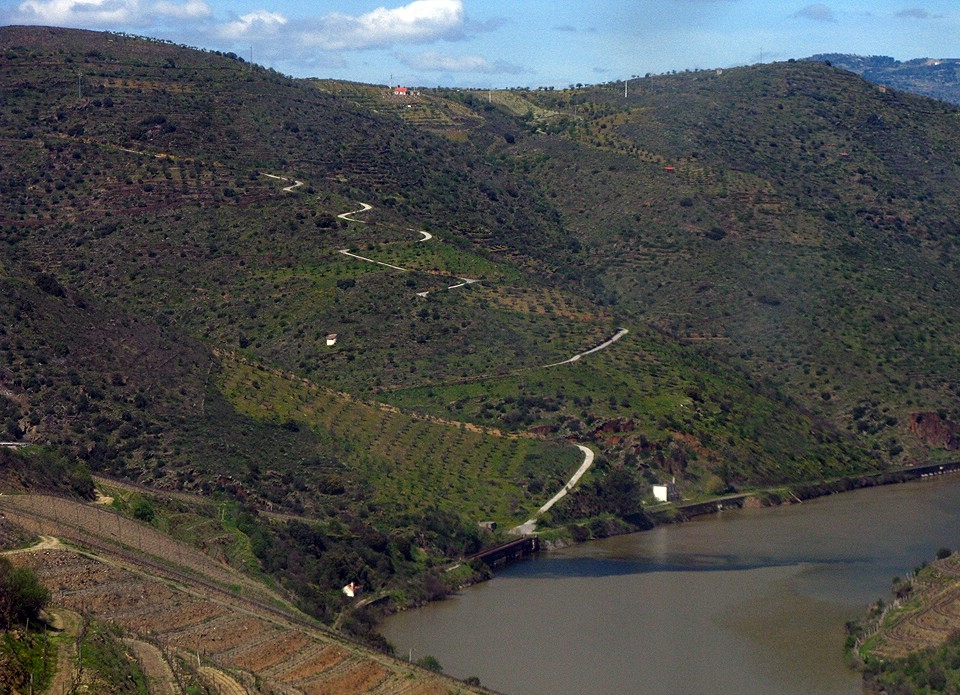
General view of the station and access road

=== Location and access ===
This station is located in the municipality of Vila Nova de Foz Côa, about 3.5 km from the town center, via the Coa road.

=== Physical characterization ===
The passenger building is located on the west side of the track (right-hand side of the uphill direction, towards Barca d'Alva). This and the other remaining infrastructures are abandoned and in a poor state of repair with the roof of the halt having collapsed likely in the last years of the 1990s.

== History ==
=== 19th century ===
The section between the stations of Pocinho and Côa was opened for operation on 5 May 1887, and the next section, to Barca d'Alva, was inaugurated on 9 December 1887.

=== 20th century ===
In 1901, a technical brigade was studying a link between this station and Estrada Real No. 34 (current EN222). However, in 1932 it still had no road access.

In 1939, the Portuguese Railway Company carried out repair work on the Côa station building.

=== Connections to other lines ===
In 1897, a bill was presented authorizing the government to call for tenders for several railway lines and branches, including a link between the Douro and Beira Alta lines, following the valleys of the Távora and Coa rivers.

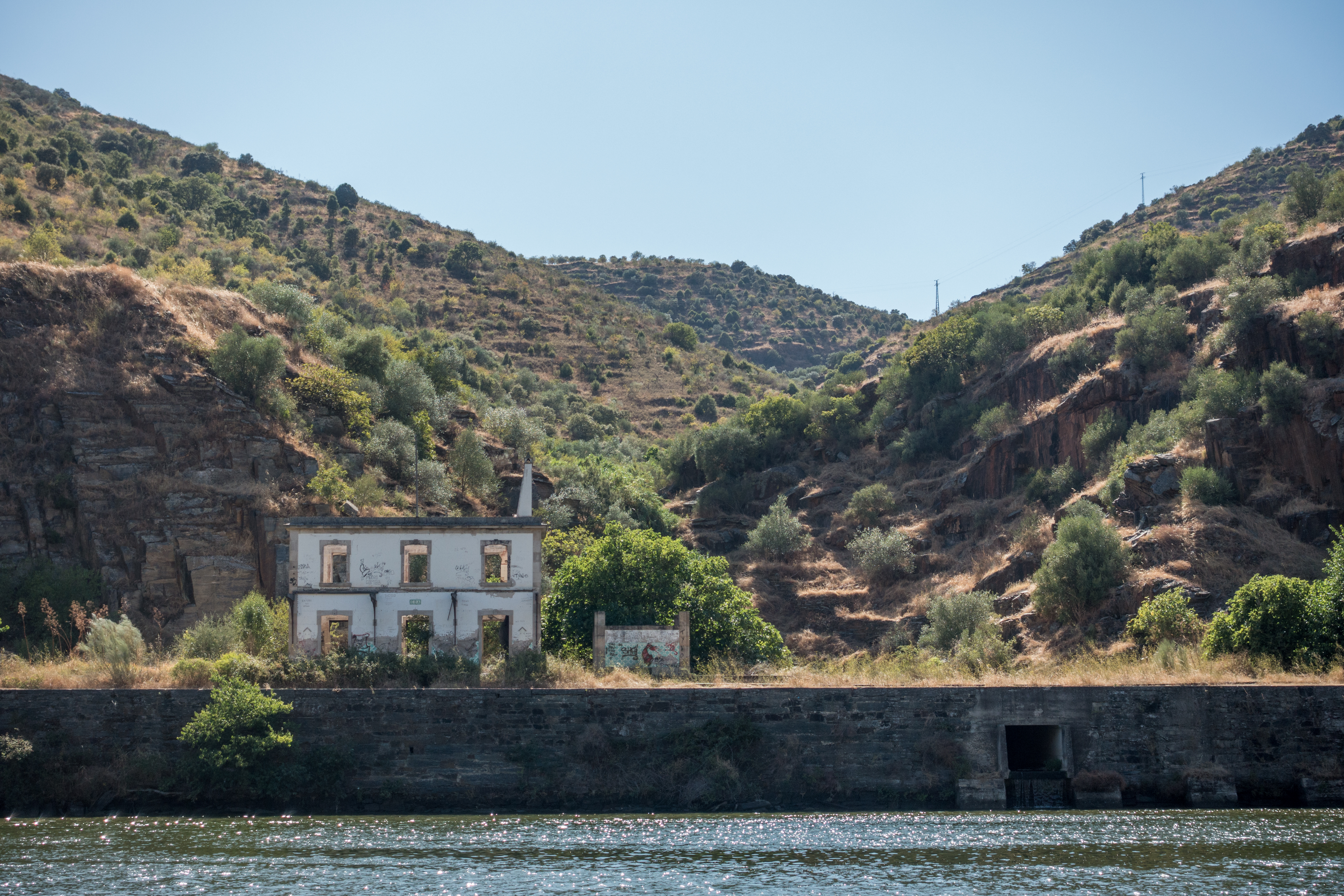
Coa halt, seen from the Douro River, in 2016

In the General Railway Network Plan, published by Decree No. 18:190, of 28 March 1930, one of the projects introduced was the Côa line, on a narrow gauge track, which was to start at Pocinho, where it would connect to the Sabor line, and end at Idanha-a-Nova, where it would be continued by the Sertã line, as far as Nazaré. This Côa Line was supposed to pass through Pinhel, Guarda, Sabugal and Penamacor.

In 1950, it was also planned to build a line between Côa and Vila Franca das Naves (on the Beira Alta line), although this route was considered difficult to build, so the journalist José da Guerra Maio suggested that the branch line should end at Vilar Formoso, since the Ribacoa plateau could be used, which had easier terrain.

This branch line between Côa (Douro line) and the Beira Alta line would provide an alternative rail link to the Maria Pia Bridge, on the Linha do Norte, and to the Barca d'Alva–La Fuente de San Esteban railway line. In fact, the latter was already in decline, depriving Porto of a direct connection to Salamanca, which could be restored via the other international line, to Vilar Formoso, if the Côa line was built.

=== Closure ===
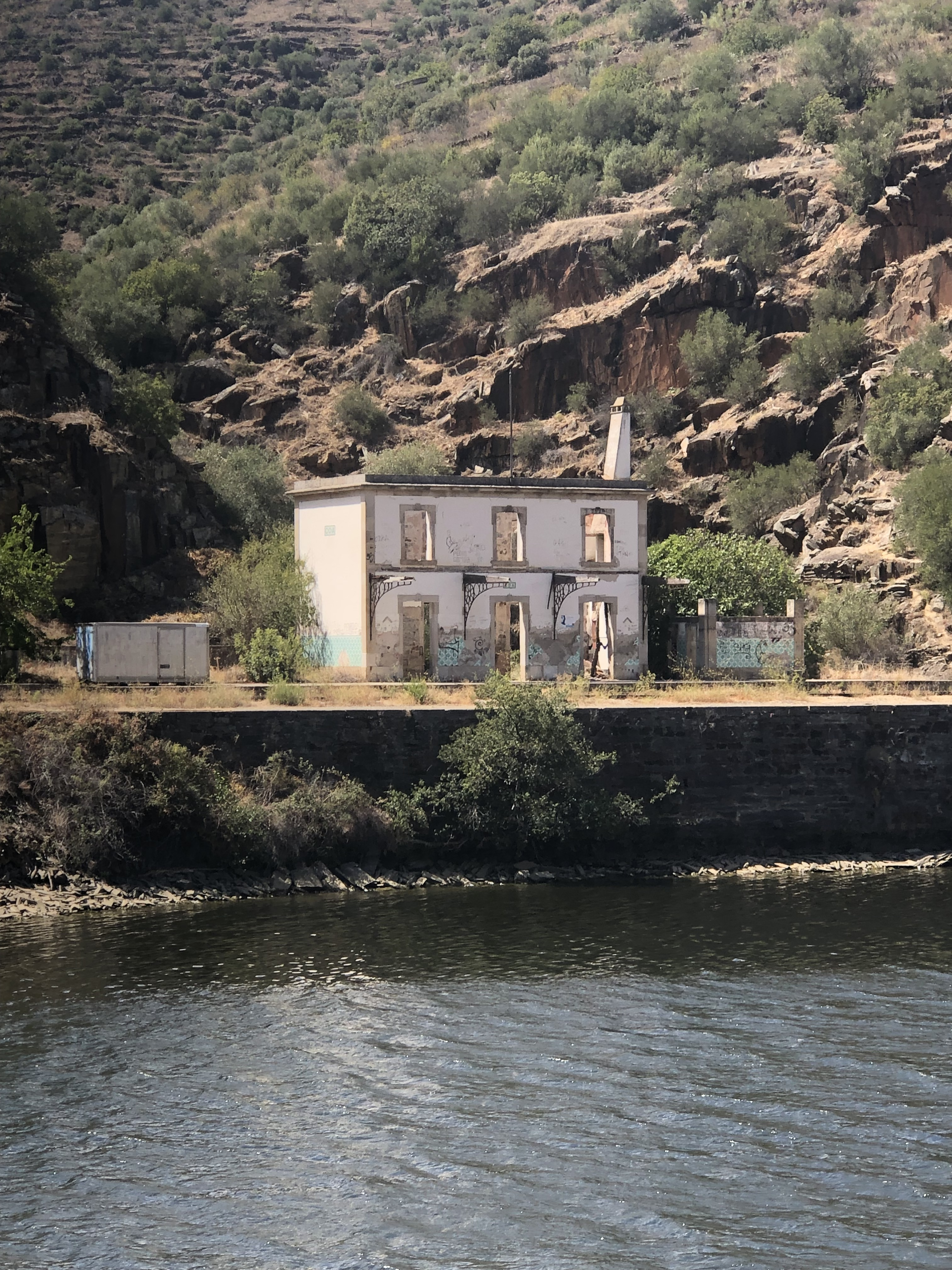
Coa halt seen from the Douro River in 2023

In 1985, Côa already had the category of halt, having been downgraded previously. In 1988, the section between Pocinho and Barca d'Alva was closed, including this interface.

== See also ==
- Douro line
- Comboios de Portugal
- Infraestruturas de Portugal
- Rail transport in Portugal
- History of rail transport in Portugal

== Bibliography ==
- CAPELO, Rui; MONTEIRO, Augusto; NUNES, João; RODRIGUES, António; TORGAL, Luís; VITORINO, Francisco (1994). História de Portugal em Datas. Círculo de Leitores, Lda. e Autores. p. 480. ISBN 972-42-1004-9.
- MARTINS, João, BRION, Madalena, SOUSA, Miguel; et al. (1996). O Caminho de Ferro Revisitado: O Caminho de Ferro em Portugal de 1856 a 1996. Lisboa: Caminhos de Ferro Portugueses. p. 446.
- REIS, Francisco; GOMES, Rosa; GOMES, Gilberto; et al. (2006). Os Caminhos de Ferro Portugueses 1856-2006. Lisboa: CP-Comboios de Portugal e Público-Comunicação Social S. A. p. 238. ISBN 989-619-078-X.
