= Barca d'Alva =

Village in Portugal

Barca d'Alva Barca d’Alva
- Village (Portugal)
- The village of Barca D’Alva and surrounding areas in 2017
- Interactive map of Barca d'Alva
- Coordinates: 41°01′37″N 6°56′28″W
- Country: Portugal
- District: Guarda
- Municipality: Figueira de Castelo Rodrigo
- Parish: Escalhão

Population (2011)
  - Total: 131
- Demonym: Mogadourense
- Website: https://cm-fcr.pt/residir-2/localidades/barca-dalva/

Barca d'Alva is a Portuguese village located in the municipality of Figueira de Castelo Rodrigo, north of the Guarda District. Barca d'Alva is also located inside the Douro International Natural Park and less than 1 km away from the Portugal-Spain border, defined by the Douro and the Águeda rivers.

== Patrimony ==
=== Population ===
Number of inhabitants

| Year | Pop. | ±% |
|---|---|---|
| 1975 | 76 | — |
| 1990 | 119 | +56.6% |
| 2000 | 109 | −8.4% |

| Year | Pop. | ±% |
|---|---|---|
| 2011 | 131 | +20.2% |
| 2015 | 87 | −33.6% |

=== Mediterranean Agriculture ===
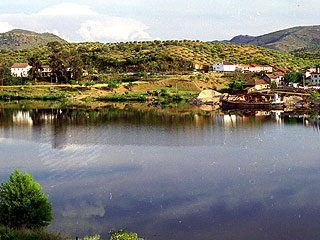
Barca d'Alva in 1995

Barca d'Alva is a very rich area when it comes to agricultural activities. As far as agriculture is concerned, the most important crops are olive groves, vineyards and almond groves. The land around Barca d'Alva produces excellent canned olives, Douro wine, Port wine and almonds for various confectionery products.

There are also some orange groves along the banks of the Douro River, which produce excellent oranges with exceptional organoleptic characteristics.

Alongside these crops, there is also livestock production, in particular Churra da Terra Quente sheep.

== History ==
=== 19th century ===
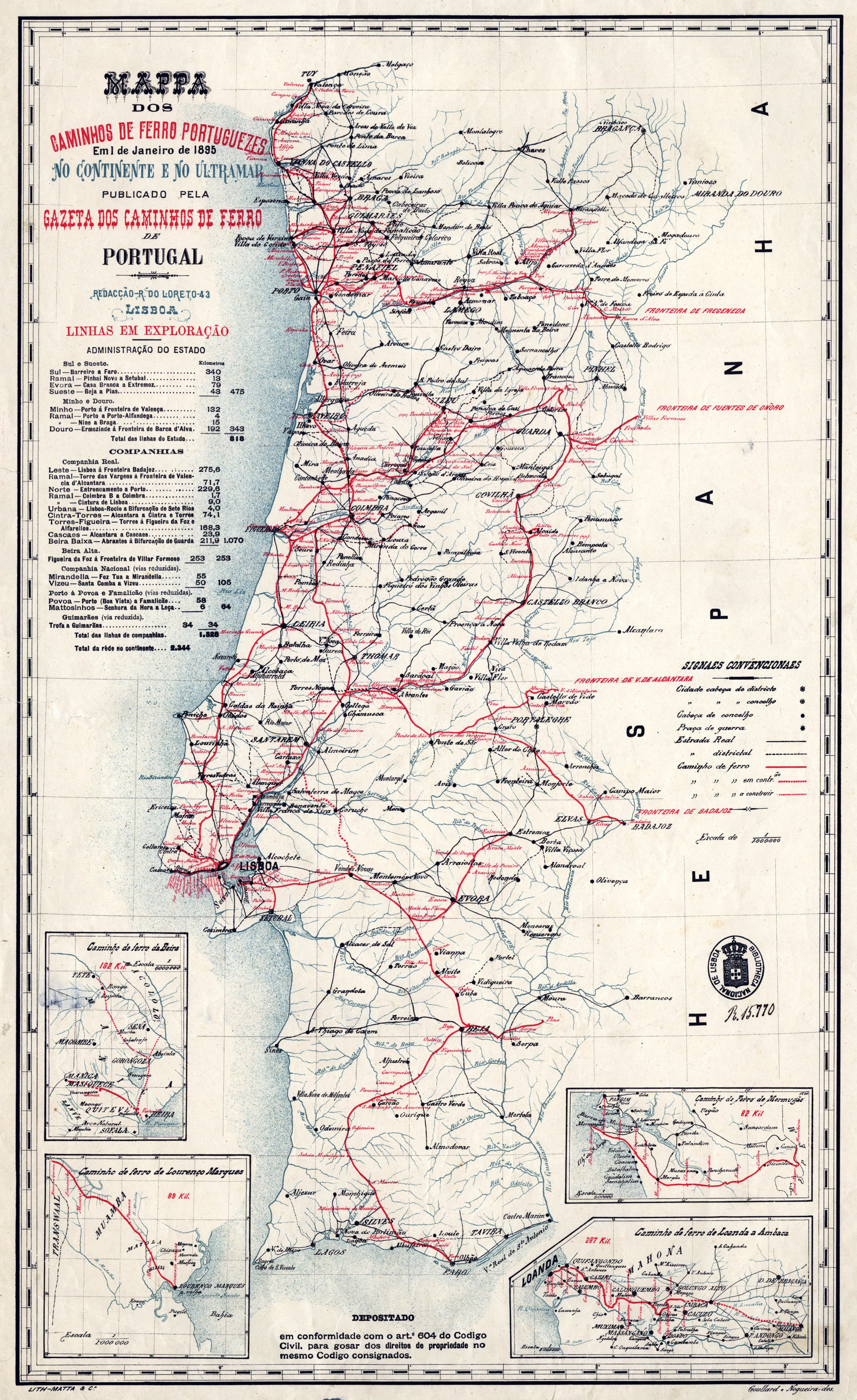
Portuguese railway lines in 1895

In 1887, Barca d'Alva became famous due to the inauguration of the last station (planned since 1883) in the Linha do Douro railway line. The end of the line had gradually moved closer and closer to the Spanish border, it expanded to Juncal in 1878, to Régua in 1879, Tua in 1883, Pocinho in January 1887, Vila Nova de Foz Côa in May 1887, and finally, Barca d’Alva in December of that same year.

=== 20th Century ===
1st class trains and carriages started roaming between Porto and Barca d'Alva in 1902. The line then suffered another expansion this time Barca d'Alva's new connection crossed the border into La Fregeneda, however it was an economic fiasco that caused the management of the Spanish part of the line to change from a Portuguese company's management to a Spanish one, the expansion of the railway line caused a decline in boat traffic in the Douro river.

As well as the normal facilities of a major station and terminal, such as stables and a turntable, Barca d'Alva had customs posts, a tax guard station and a hotel.

In 1985, the Boadilla-Fregeneda-Fronteira do Águeda section was closed. Barca d'Alva and the Douro consequently lost their international connection, and in 1988 it was the turn of the last train to beep in Barca d'Alva, with the closure of the Pocinho-Barca d'Alva section.

=== 21st century ===
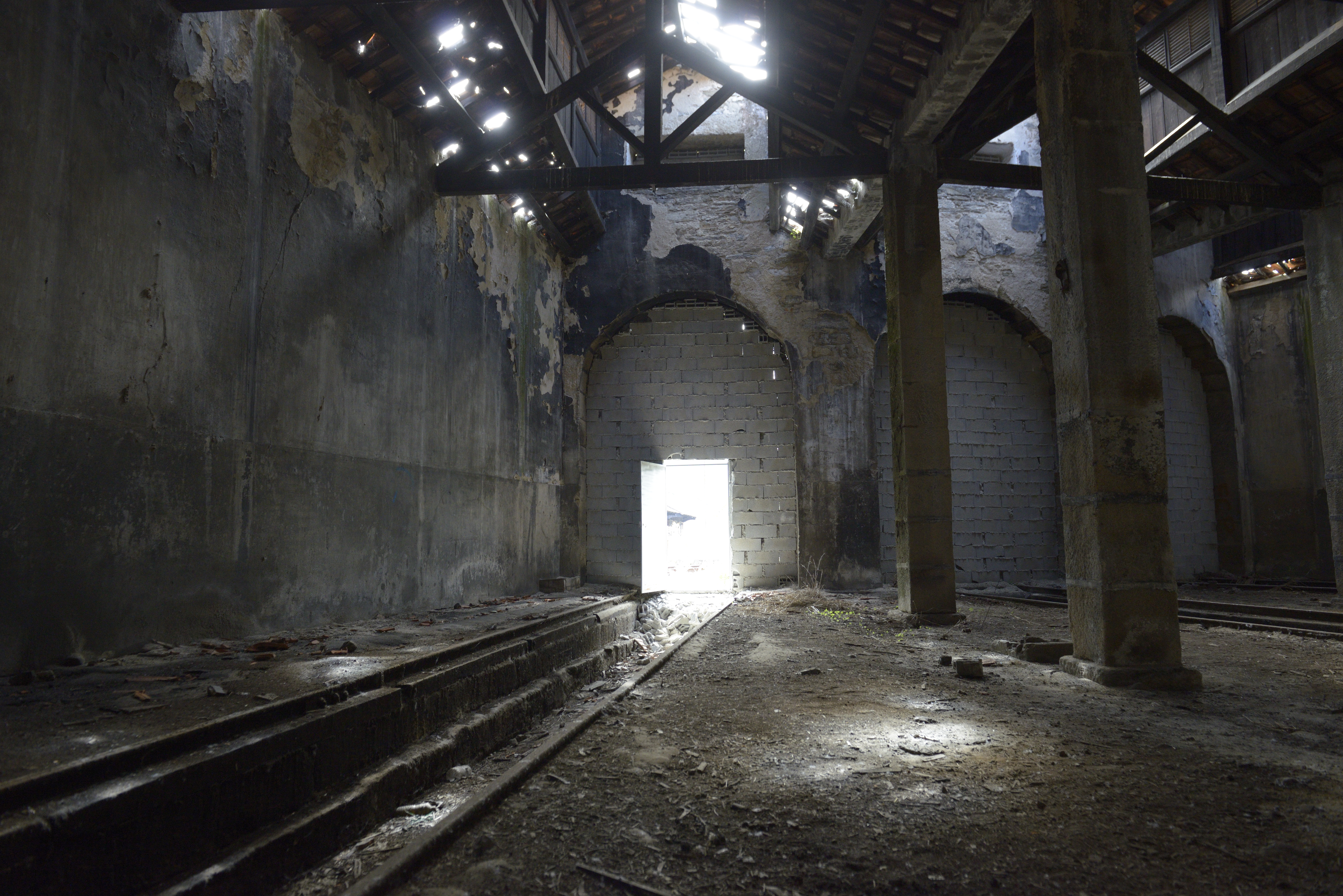
Depot of the station in 2017

As of 2023, the entire station area is abandoned and Barca d'Alva is declining in terms of infrastructure and population.

== See also ==
- History of rail transport in Portugal
- Douro Line
- Barca d'Alva–La Fuente de San Esteban railway
