= Class 592 =

Class 592 may refer to:

- CP Class 592, diesel multiple units
- Renfe Class 592, diesel multiple units
