= Santo Isidoro, Marco de Canaveses =

Santo Isidoro
- Civil parish
- Location in Portugal
- Coordinates: 41°12′28″N 8°8′38″W
- Country: Portugal
- Region: Norte
- Intermunic. comm.: Tâmega e Sousa
- District: Porto
- Municipality: Marco de Canaveses
- Disbanded: 2013

Area
  - Total: 3.73 km^{2} (1.44 sq mi)

Population (2001)
  - Total: 1,495
  - Density: 400/km^{2} (1,000/sq mi)
- Time zone: UTC+00:00 (WET)
  - Summer (DST): UTC+01:00 (WEST)
- Postal code: 4635-287
- Area code: 255
- Patron: Santo Isidoro

Santo Isidoro is a former civil parish in the municipality of Marco de Canaveses, northern Portugal. In 2013, the parish merged into the new parish Santo Isidoro e Livração. In 2001 there were 1495 inhabitants in a 3.73 square kilometres (1.44 sq mi) region fronting the Douro.

== History ==
Near the locality of Bouças, exists Penedo da Moura, a large collection of stones that were likely a dismantled dolmen, and in its surroundings are the vestiges of castros and small human settlements, such as in Toutosa and Canaveses (the lateral a Roman village).

During the medieval period, Santo Isidoro acted as a stopping point for wayfarers and pilgrims transiting the region, but obtained local administrative privileges owing to its master, Egas Moniz. Celebrated nobleman in service to Afonso Henriques, Moniz was master of Canaveses and the Tuías, he was responsible for installing the legal magistrates in these territories, and his signeurial holdings lead to the annex of Canaveses. A regal charter by Manuel I, dated July 1497, clearly affirmed, "...the town of Canaveses, and the localities and the annexes" were registered to Egas Moniz. But, any illusions of privileges ended in 1550, by order of John III, following the death of his nephew Manuel.

Administratively, the parish was integrated into the municipality of Santa Cruz de Riba Tâmega, and only joined Marco de Canaveses in the 19th century.

In 1809, Santo Isidoro de Riba-Tâmega suffered from the French invasions: it was near the centre that a bloody battle ensued between the French and Portuguese. A cross was erected near this site to mark the event.

== Geography ==
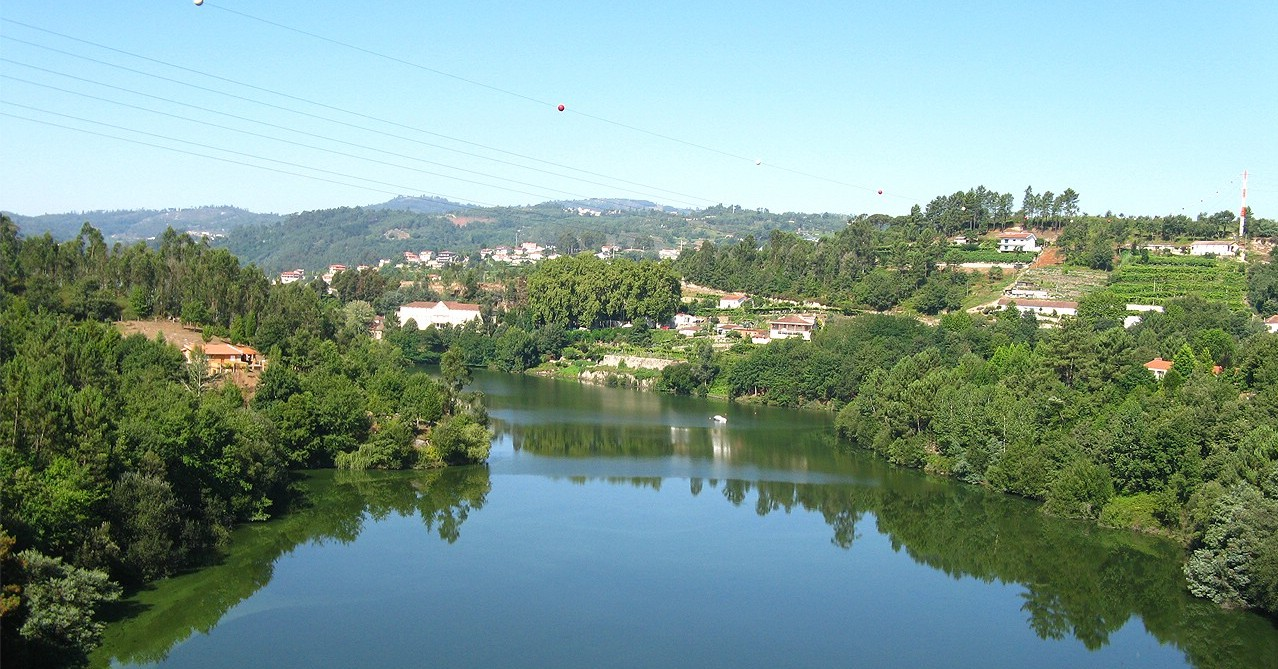
A view of the Tâmega River flowing on the south margin of Santo Isidoro

The local areas name, in homage to Saint Isidore of Seville, provides an understanding of the regions link to religious activities. In fact, the name provides an indication of the age, since the parish seat occupies the summit of a large mountaintop, with a slope that followed the Tâmega and its effluents.

Lying on the bank of the Tâmega, also known as the Riba Tâmega, the parish occupies the flanks of the hills of Santa Cruz, delimited by Toutosa, Sobretâmega, Vila Caíz (Amarante) and the river. It is 4 kilometres (2.5 mi) from the municipal seat.

The important point in the parish is the Centro Cultural, Recreativo e Folclórico de Santo Isidoro, the only local association that originates in Santo Isidoro.

== Economy ==
The rural area is primarily responsible for agriculture, with other activities in the textile and forest industry occupying a secondary role in the communities. Industry is the important activity, responsible for employing 57% of the working population.

== Architecture ==
The historical architecture of Santo Isidoro is simple, with the ostentatious Casa da Boavista, being the exception. Home to a traditional family, the interior is marked by a coat-of-arms and panels of azulejos; it was restored in order to introduce and promote rural tourism. In addition, the following architectural buildings have been classified by national patrimonial institutions:

- Bridge of Bairro (Portuguese: Ponte de Bairro), the medieval Romanesque bridge of a single archway, is located in the locality of Bairro, some 100 metres (330 ft) from the community centre;
- Church of Santo Isidoro (Portuguese: Igreja Românica de Santo Isidoro/Igreja Paroquial de Santo Isidoro), dating from the Romanesque period, the small temple included three altars, with an image of the patron (a sculpture by Teixeira Lopes, offered in 1898 to Azevedo Maia, parish priest) and grande frescoes likely authored by Moraes.
