= Ângelo da Cunha Pinto =

Ângelo da Cunha Pinto (2 December 1948 – 7 October 2015) was a Portuguese-Brazilian chemist and professor at the Federal University of Rio de Janeiro.

Born in Marco de Canaveses, Portugal, Pinto was one of the more prominent national chemists with a specialism in the natural products of Brazil. He was qualified as a pharmacist from the Federal University of Rio de Janeiro in 1971, and earned a master's degree in chemistry at the Instituto Militar de Engenharia, and a PhD in organic chemistry at the same university he taught at, under the guidance of Roderick Arthur Barnes. He received several awards and is acclaimed as one of Brazil's most influential scientists. He died in October 2015 in Niterói, Brazil.
