= Almirante Sarmento Rodrigues Bridge =

Almirante Sarmento Rodrigues Bridge Ponte Almirante Sarmento Rodrigues
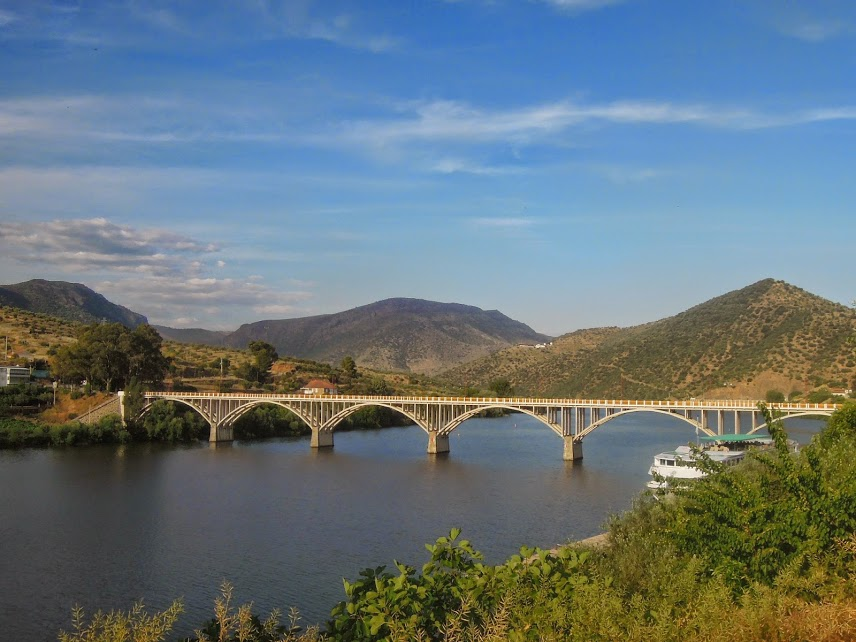
- Coordinates: 41°01′45″N 6°56′29″W
- Carries: N221
- Crosses: Douro
- Locale: Barca d'Alva, Guarda District, Portugal
- Other name(s): Highway Bridge of Barca d'Alva, Sarmento Rodrigues bridge

Characteristics
- Design: Arch bridge
- Material: Reinforced concrete
- Total length: 225 m

History
- Designer: Edgar Cardoso

Almirante Sarmento Rodrigues Bridge, also known as the Highway Bridge of Barca d'Alva (Portuguese: Ponte Almirante Sarmento Rodrigues) is a road bridge over the Douro river, located near the village of Barca d'Alva in the Guarda District, Portugal, around 800 metres (0.50 mi) west of the border with Spain. It carries national route N221.

The bridge was designed in 1955 by Edgar Cardoso. It is named for Portuguese naval officer and colonial administrator Sarmento Rodrigues.

== See also ==
- List of bridges in Portugal
