= Águeda (river) =

River in Portugal and Spain

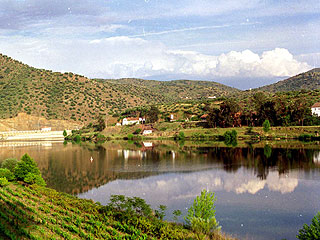
- The confluence of the Águeda River and Douro as seen from Barca d'Alva

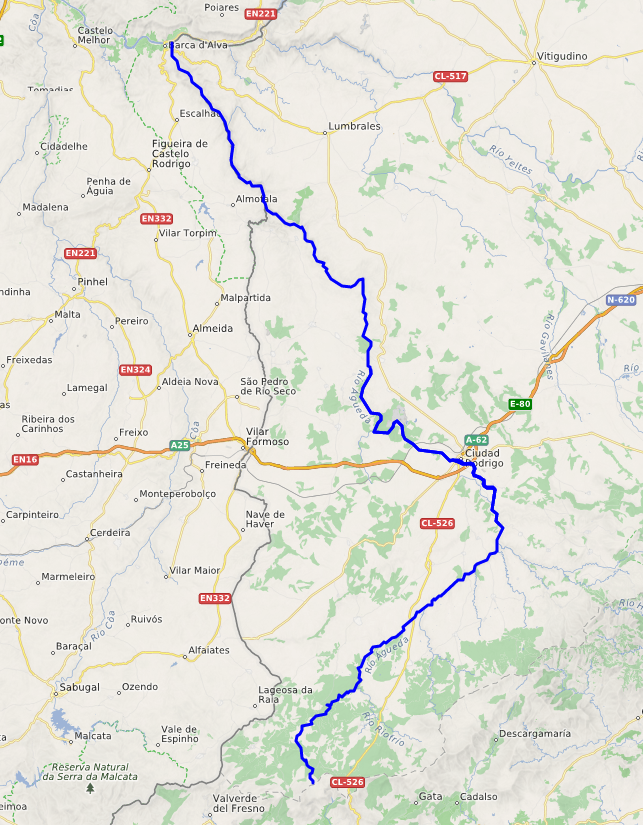

Location
- Country: Portugal, Spain

Physical characteristics
- Source: Serra das Mesas
  - location: Spain
- Mouth: Douro River
  - coordinates: 41°1′42″N 6°55′52″W
- Length: 130 km (81 mi)
- Basin size: 2,537.08 km^{2} (979.57 sq mi)
- Discharge
  - average: 197.2 m^{3}/s (6,960 cu ft/s)

Basin features
- Progression: Douro→ Atlantic Ocean
- River system: Douro

The Águeda (pronounced [ˈaɣɨðɐ]) is a river tributary of the Douro River, that springs from the Serra das Mesas in Spain, in the autonomous community of Castile and León. It flows 130 kilometres (81 mi) until it reaches the Douro River near Barca de Alva, Portugal. The Portugal–Spain border follows the Águeda for much of its course.

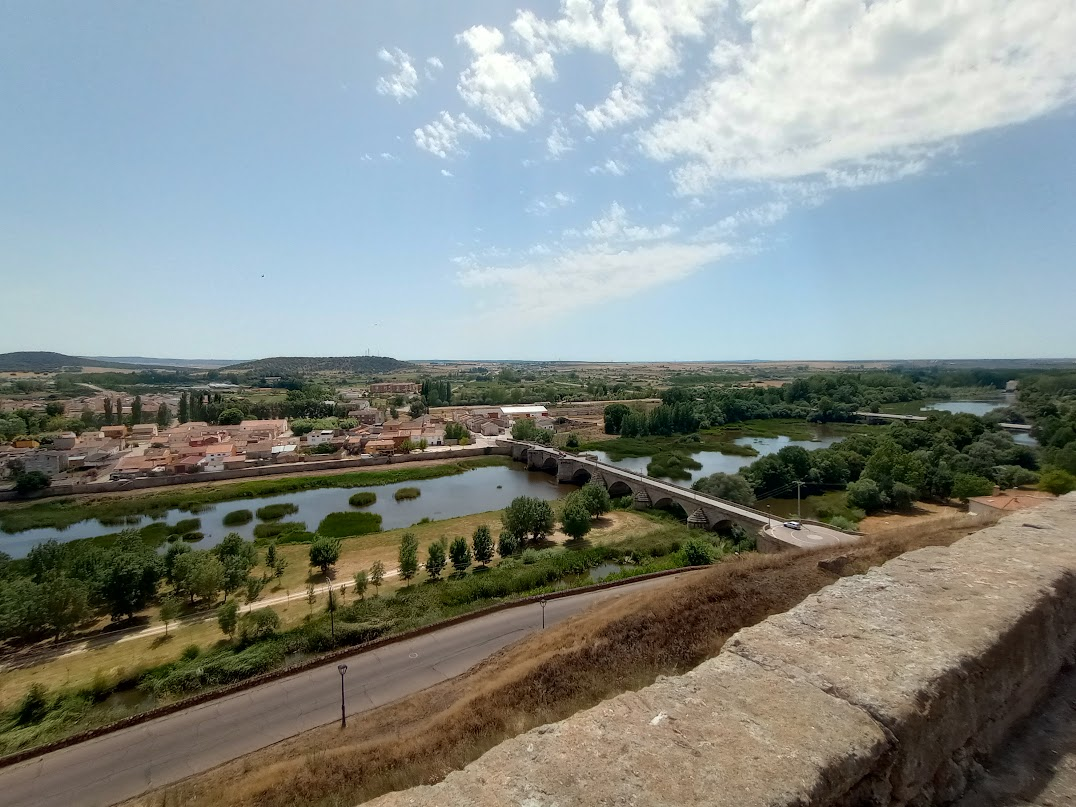
View of the river near Ciudad Rodrigo

== See also ==
- List of rivers of Spain
