= Alpendorada, Várzea e Torrão =

- Civil parish
- Location in Portugal
- Coordinates: 41.087°N 8.243°W
- Country: Portugal
- Region: Norte
- Intermunic. comm.: Tâmega e Sousa
- District: Porto
- Municipality: Marco de Canaveses

Area
  - Total: 16.82 km^{2} (6.49 sq mi)

Population (2011)
  - Total: 8,485
  - Density: 504.5/km^{2} (1,307/sq mi)
- Time zone: UTC+00:00 (WET)
  - Summer (DST): UTC+01:00 (WEST)

Alpendorada, Várzea e Torrão is a civil parish in the municipality of Marco de Canaveses, Portugal. It was formed in 2013 by the merger of the former parishes Alpendurada e Matos, Várzea do Douro and Torrão. The population in 2011 was 8,485, in an area of 16.82 km².

== History ==
It was created during the administrative reorganization of 2013, resulting from the aggregation of the former parishes of Alpendurada and Matos, Várzea do Douro and Torrão.
