= Juncal railway station =

Railway station in Portugal

Juncal
- The Juncal station seen in the 1880s

General information
- Location: Paredes de Viadores, Marco de Canaveses; Portugal
- Coordinates: 41.14065°N 8.11954°W
- Line: Douro line (1878-present)
- Platforms: 1
- Tracks: 2

Other information
- Status: Operational

History
- Opened: 15 September 1878; 148 years ago
Location
- Location within Portugal

The Juncal Railway Station (Portuguese: Estação Ferroviária de Juncal) is a railway station located in the village of Juncal, part of the civil parish of Paredes de Viadores, in the municipality of Marco de Canaveses. The station is served by Comboios de Portugal (CP), via the Douro line.

== Description ==
=== Location and access ===
It is located near the village of Paredes de Viadores, with access via Rua do Juncal. It is located between the Marco de Canaveses railway station and the Pala halt.

=== Infrastructure ===
By January 2011, the station had two running tracks, both 362 metres (1,188 ft) long, and one platform measuring 115 metres (377 ft) in length and 30 centimetres (12 in) in height.

=== Services ===
The station is exclusively served by Regional services operated by Comboios de Portugal between the main stations of Marco de Canaveses and Mosteirô.

== History ==
The station opened on 15 September 1878 as the temporary terminus of the Douro line. The following section, extending to Régua, opened to traffic on 15 July 1879.

In 1933, the Administrative Commission of the Special Railway Fund authorised works to pave the access road to the station's loading platform. On 23 April of the following year, it approved the construction of an access ramp to the platform and the paving of the goods yard. These works were put out to tender by the Directorate-General of Railways. A decree issued by the Ministry of Public Works and Communications, published in *Diário do Governo* No. 192, Series II, on 18 August 1937, approved the final acceptance certificate for contract No. 7, covering both works, which had been awarded to Justino Teixeira.

== See also ==
- Rail transport in Portugal
- History of rail transport in Portugal
