= Linha do Douro =

Portuguese railway line

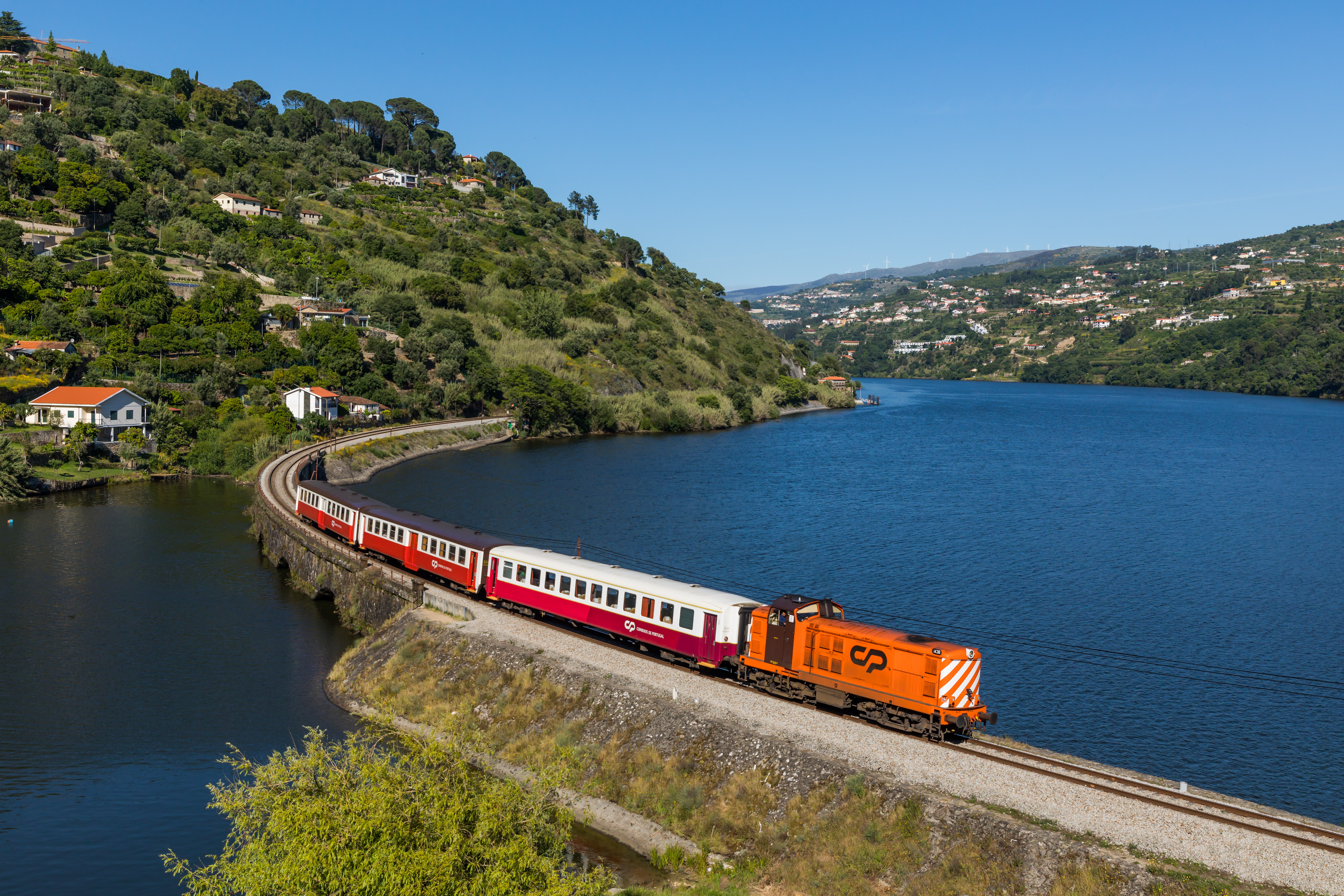
- A passenger train heading to towards Porto São Bento crossing the Douro River

Overview
- Status: Operational
- Owner: Infraestruturas de Portugal
- Locale: Distrito do Porto; Distrito de Vila Real; Distrito de Bragança; Distrito da Guarda
- Termini: Ermesinde; Pocinho
- Stations: 44 (Ermesinde–Pocinho)

Service
- Type: Commuter rail Regional rail
- Operator(s): Comboios de Portugal (passenger); Medway (freight)
- Depot: Porto - Contumil
- Rolling stock: CP 1400; CP 592.0 / 592.2; Medway 1400; Medway 1900; Medway 1960; Medway 335.0; Medway 5600; Medway 4700

History
- Opened: Stages between 1875 and 1887

Technical
- Line length: 160 km (99 miles)
- Number of tracks: 2 (Ermesinde - Caíde); 1 (Caíde - Pocinho)
- Track gauge: 1,668 mm (5 ft 5 21/32 in) Iberian gauge
- Electrification: 25 kV 50 Hz AC OHLE (Ermesinde to Marco de Canavezes)
- Operating speed: Maximum 140 km/h (87 mph)
- Signalling: Automatic with Orientable Block (Ermesinde to Caíde); Telephonic (Caíde to Pocinho)

Location on the network
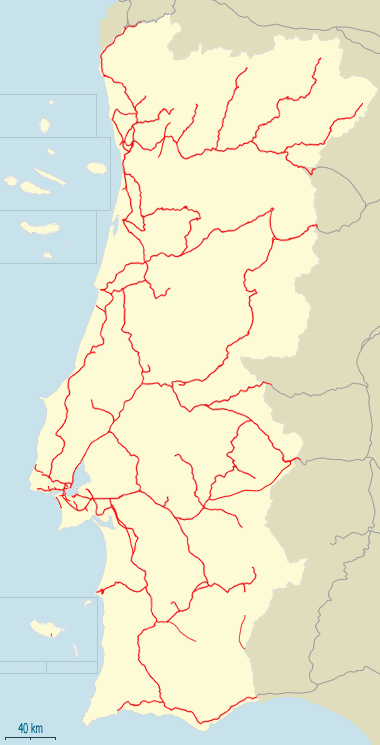

+ Ermesinde × Pocinho (🔎)

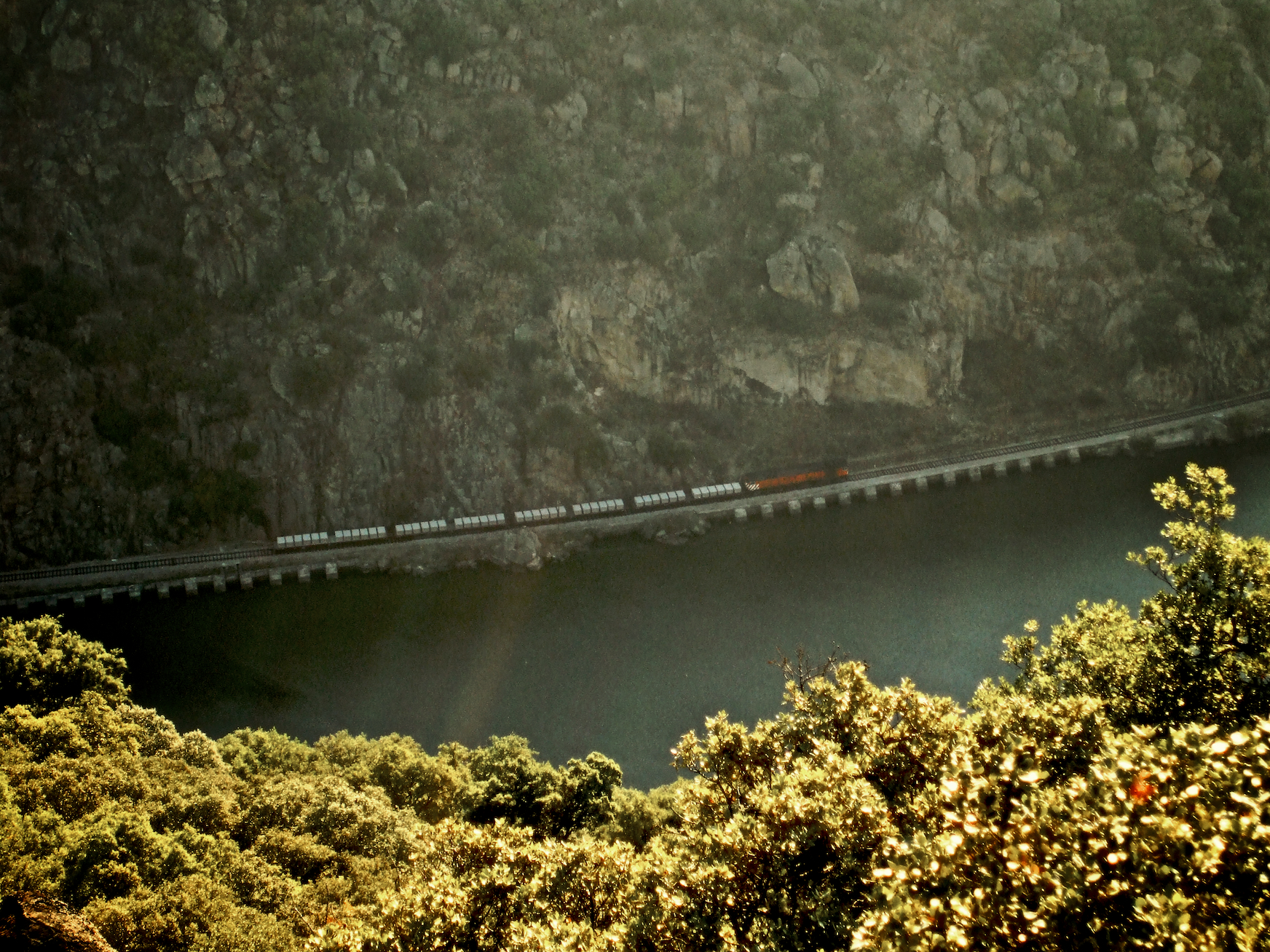
Freight train near Valeira on the Douro line, September 2008

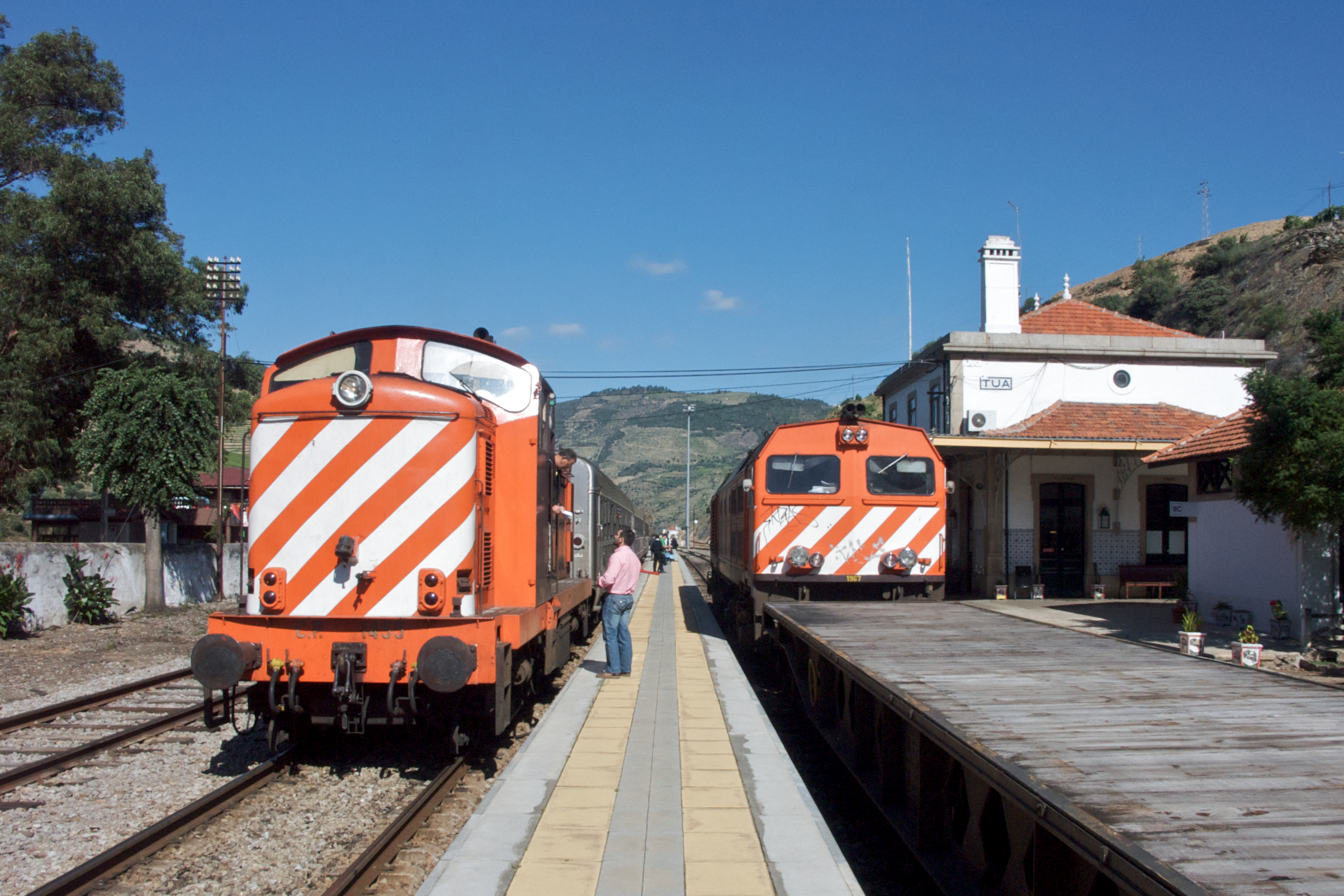
Tua station on the Douro line: a Série 1400 locomotive heading a passenger train (left) passing a freight train headed by a Série 1960 (right)

The Douro line (Portuguese: Linha do Douro) is a 99-mile (160 km) railway line in northern Portugal that runs from Ermesinde to the eastern terminus at Pocinho. The line runs close to the Douro River for much of its route, offering scenic views of the river and valley. Passenger trains are operated by Comboios de Portugal (CP) and run between Porto São Bento and Pocinho, taking 3 hours and 20 minutes. Freight trains operated by Medway also run on the line.

== Construction ==
Section	Length	Opened
Ermesinde–Penafiel	30.311 km	July 29, 1875
Penafiel–Caíde	7.328 km	December 20, 1875
Caíde–Juncal	18.818 km	September 15, 1878
Juncal–Régua	38.371 km	July 15, 1879
Régua–Ferrão	15.813 km	April 4, 1880
Ferrão–Pinhão	7.611 km	June 1, 1880
Pinhão–Tua	12.993 km	September 1, 1883
Tua–Pocinho	31.678 km	January 10, 1887
Pocinho–Côa	9.061 km	May 5, 1887
Côa–Barca d'Alva	18.882 km	December 9, 1887
Continuation to La Fuente de San Esteban	Barca d'Alva–La Fuente de San Esteban railway	December 9, 1887

== Route ==
From west to east, the line runs from the junction at Ermesinde to Pocinho. The line formerly continued east for a further 28 kilometres to the Spanish border. Until 1984, the track connected to a Spanish line, thus allowing through trains to/from Salamanca.

Passenger trains normally run from São Bento station in Porto to Pocinho, with some not running as far as the eastern terminus. The line is built to the Iberian gauge of 1,668 mm (5 ft 5 21/32 in). The line is single track, apart from a double track section between Ermesinde and Caíde (the authorisation for the dualling work was given by CP in 1993).

In 1984, the Spanish rail operator Renfe announced the closure of its connecting line from La Fuente de San Esteban to the Portuguese border. With the loss of international traffic, CP had to close its line east of Barca d'Alva to Spain. The service was cut back to Pocinho in 1988, which has since remained the eastern terminus of the Douro line.

As of May 2023, there are intentions to reactivate the extension from Pocinho to the border town of Barca d'Alva, with a preliminary study commissioned on May 10th.

== Branch lines ==
There were formerly five metre gauge branch lines connecting with the Douro line, but the last of these closed in 2009. Geographically, from west to east they were:

- The Penafiel to Lixa and Entre-os-Rios Railway, which closed in the 1920s after less than 20 years of operation
- The Tâmega line, which closed in 2009 and ran north from a junction with the Douro line at Livração
- The Corgo line, which closed in 2009 and ran north from a junction with the Douro line at Regua
- The Tua line, which closed in 2008 and ran north from a junction with the Douro line at Tua
- The Sabor line, which closed in 1988 and ran north-east from a junction with the Douro line at Pocinho

== See also ==
- List of railway lines in Portugal
- List of Portuguese locomotives and railcars
- History of rail transport in Portugal
- CP Class 1400 - diesel locomotives frequently used on the line
- National Railway Museum (Portugal)
- Sorefame - builder of most of the rolling stock used on the line
- Barca d'Alva–La Fuente de San Esteban railway
