= Santo Isidoro e Livração =

- Civil parish
- Location in Portugal
- Coordinates: 41.22°N 8.15°W
- Country: Portugal
- Region: Norte
- Intermunic. comm.: Tâmega e Sousa
- District: Porto
- Municipality: Marco de Canaveses

Area
  - Total: 4.67 km^{2} (1.80 sq mi)

Population (2011)
  - Total: 2,083
  - Density: 446/km^{2} (1,160/sq mi)
- Time zone: UTC+00:00 (WET)
  - Summer (DST): UTC+01:00 (WEST)

Santo Isidoro e Livração is a civil parish in the municipality of Marco de Canaveses, Portugal. It was formed in 2013 by the merger of the former parishes Toutosa and Santo Isidoro. The population in 2011 was 2,083, in an area of 4.67 km^{2}.
