= Barca d'Alva–La Fuente de San Esteban railway =

Railway line

International railway line between Barca d'Alva and La Fuente de San Esteban
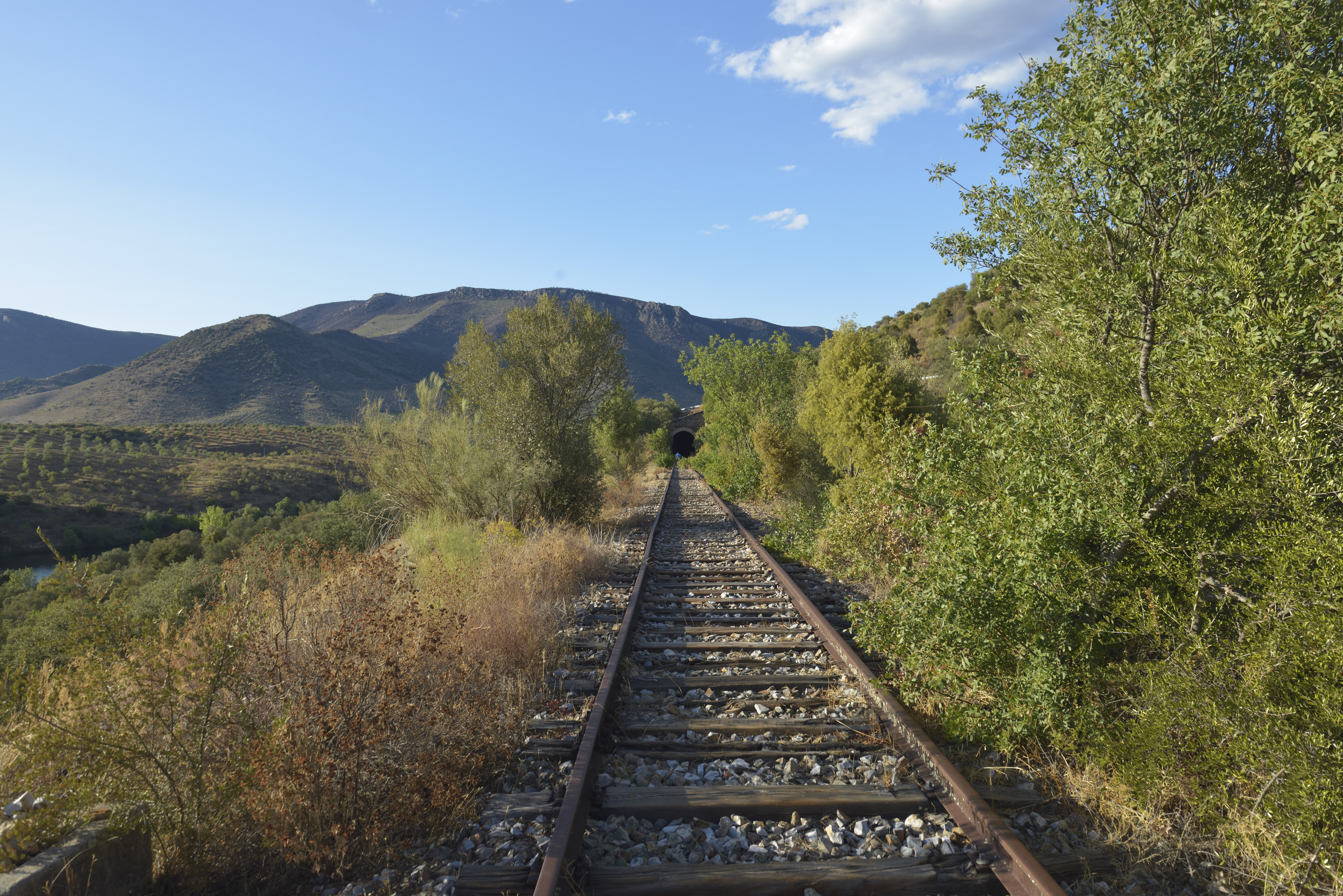

Overview
- Termini: Barca d'Alva; La Fuente de San Esteban

Service
- Operator(s): CP and Adif

History
- Opened: 9 December 1887
- Closed: 1 January 1985 (Spanish segment); 1988 (Portuguese segment)

Technical
- Line length: 77.5 km (48.2 mi)
- Track gauge: Iberian

Location on the network
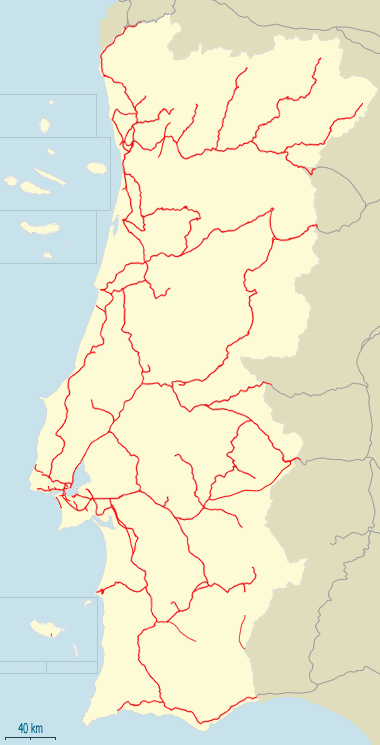

+ Barca d'Alva × LFdSE-B (🔎)

The Barca d'Alva–La Fuente de San Esteban railway is a closed Iberian gauge line which connected the Barca d'Alva railway station on the Douro line in northeastern Portugal to the Spanish railway network. Passenger and cargo trains operated from Porto to Salamanca from its opening in 1887 until its closure on the Spanish side in 1985, with the Portuguese side also subsequently truncated to Pocinho three years later.

== See also ==
- History of rail transport in Spain
- History of rail transport in Portugal
