= CP Class 592 =

Spanish train

Série 592
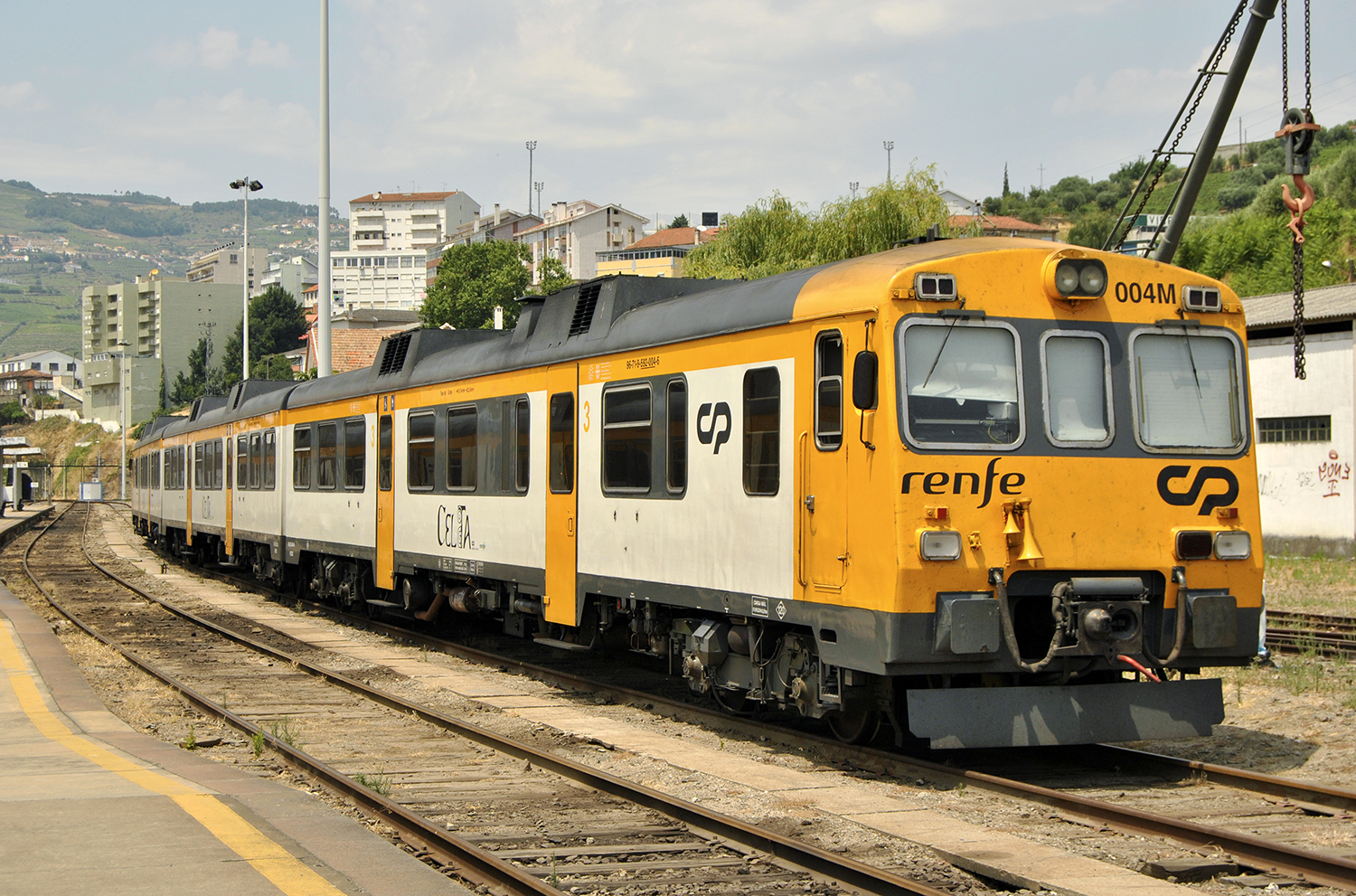
- Série 592 train at Régua station, 2013

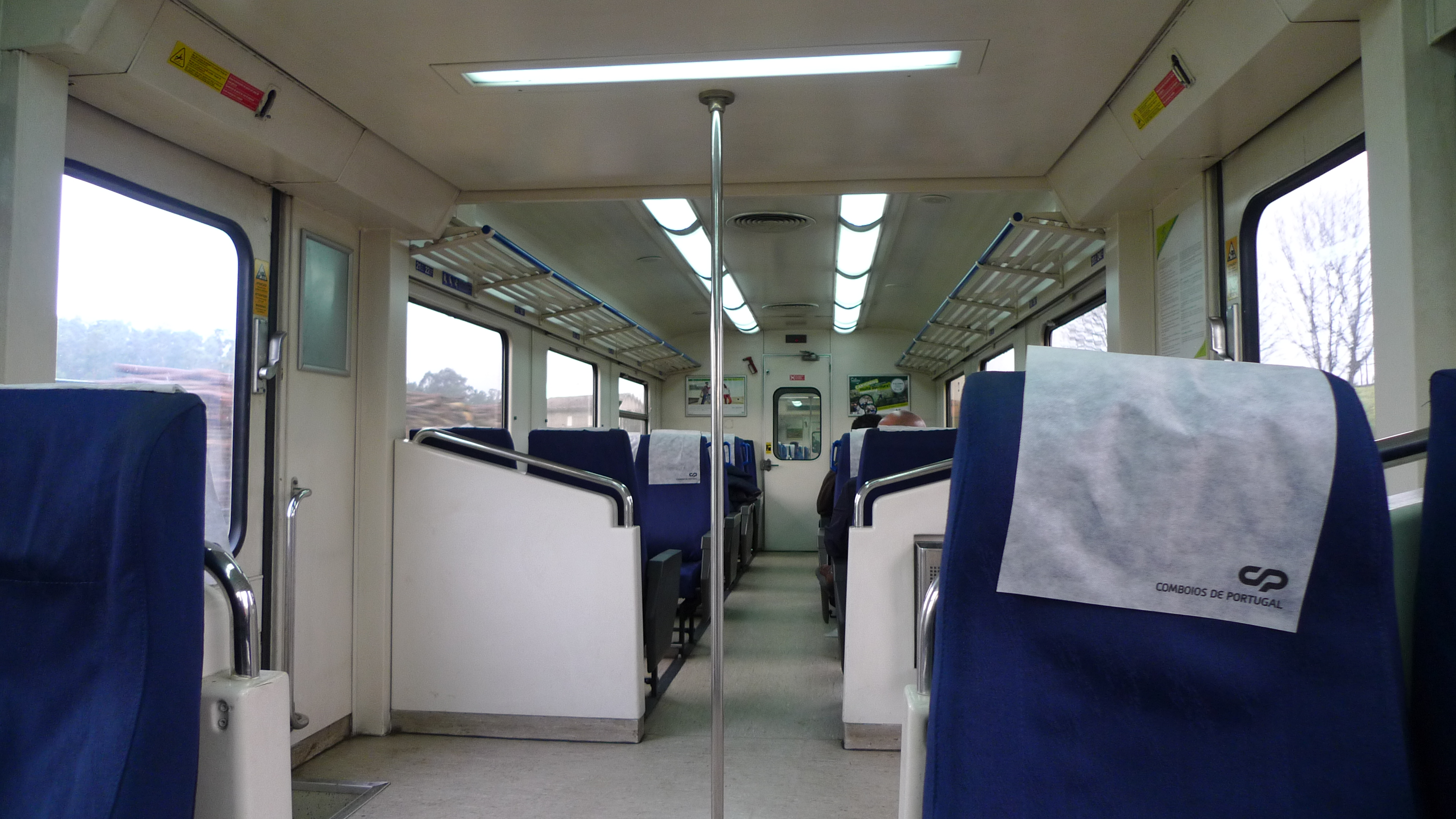
- Interior
- Manufacturer: MACOSA and ATEINSA
- Entered service: 1981 (Spain); 2011 (Portugal)
- Number in service: 20
- Capacity: 196 (2nd class)
- Operators: Renfe; Comboios de Portugal

Specifications
- Doors: Electric doors, 6 on each side
- Maximum speed: 120 kilometres per hour (75 mph)
- Transmission: Hydro-mechanical transmission
- HVAC: Air conditioning
- Braking system(s): Electro-pneumatic brake
- Track gauge: 1,668 mm (5 ft 5 21/32 in)

Série 592, nicknamed Espanholas and Camelos, is a Spanish train type currently used in Portugal by Comboios de Portugal on the Minho, Douro and Oeste lines.
