= Marco de Canaveses =

- Municipality
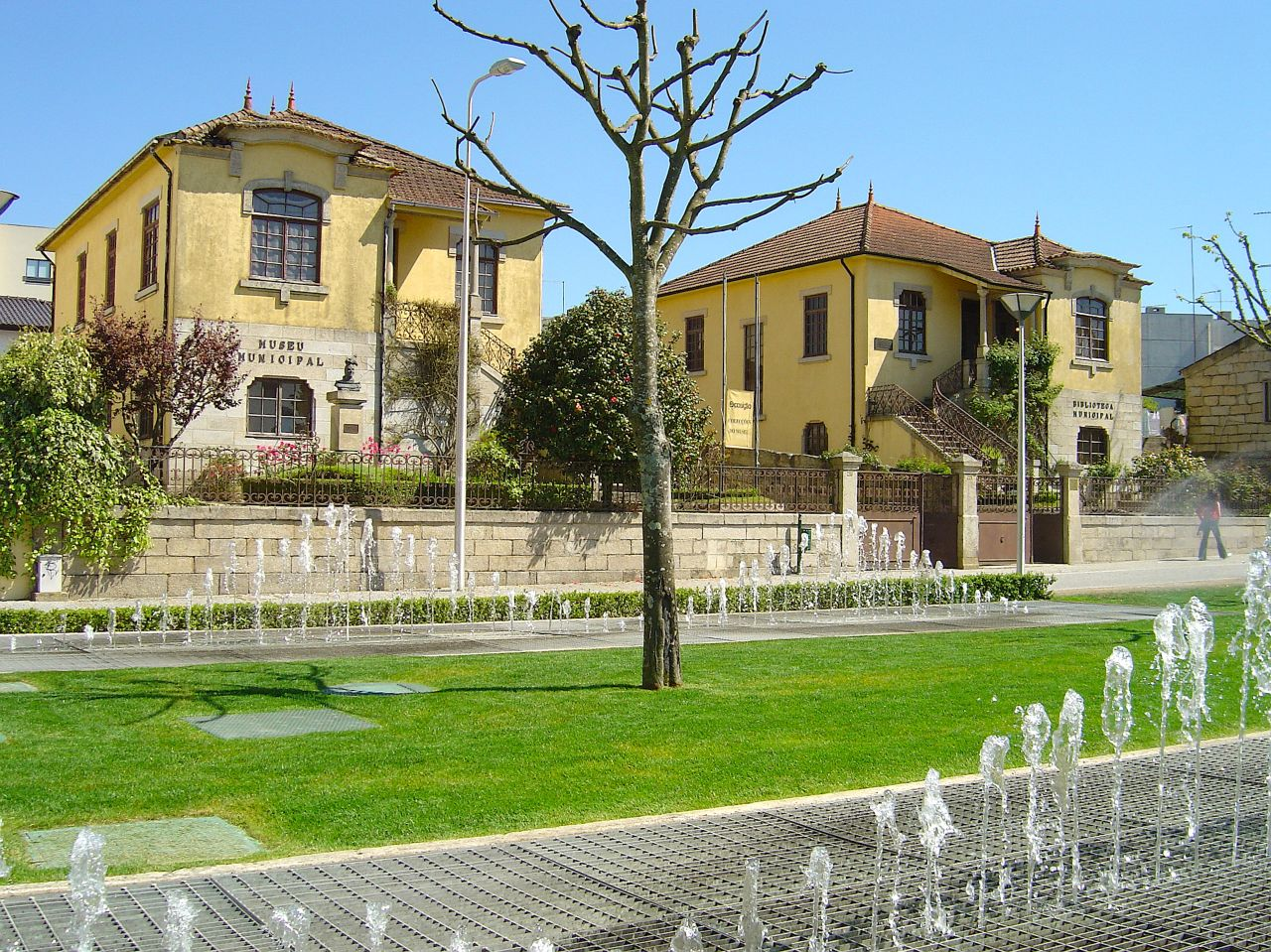
- View of Marco de Canaveses

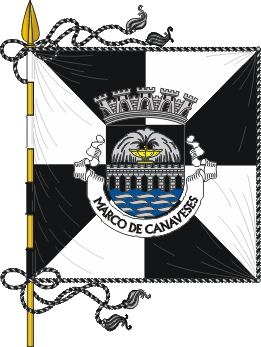
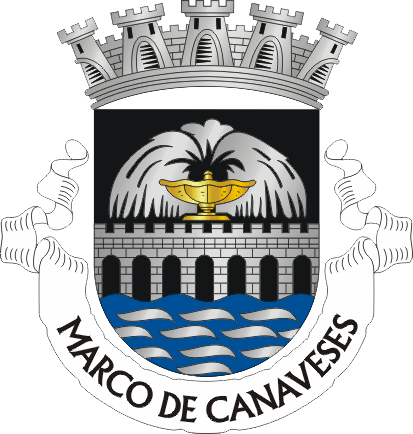
- Flag Coat of arms
- Interactive map of Marco de Canaveses
- Location in Portugal
- Coordinates: 41°11′N 08°09′W
- Country: Portugal
- Region: Norte
- Intermunic. comm.: Tâmega e Sousa
- District: Porto
- Parishes: 16

Area
  - Total: 201.89 km^{2} (77.95 sq mi)

Population (2011)
  - Total: 53,450
  - Density: 264.7/km^{2} (685.7/sq mi)
- Time zone: UTC+00:00 (WET)
  - Summer (DST): UTC+01:00 (WEST)
- Website: Official website

Marco de Canaveses (European Portuguese pronunciation: [ˈmaɾku ðɨ kɐnɐˈvezɨʃ]) is a city and municipality in Porto district, in northern Portugal. The population in 2011 was 53,450, in an area of 201.89 km^{2}. The city itself had a population of 9,042 in 2001.

== Geography ==
The city of Marco Canaveses is strongly influenced by its topography, with mainly areas at altitudes between 200 and 600 meters, reaching the highest levels in Aboboreira and Montedeiras Mountains. The highest point of the county is situated at an altitude of 962 meters, in Aboboreira Mountain, which is shared by the municipalities of Marco de Canaveses, Amarante and Baião. In Montedeiras Mountain is reached a peak of 640 meters. To the north it lies the Marão Mountain, in the municipality of Amarante. The region is also traversed by two of the most important Portuguese rivers, the Douro river and Tâmega river. The Douro, reaching from "Trás-os-Montes" region (interior north of Portugal), east to west course, limits the county to the south, separating it from the municipalities of Cinfães and Castelo de Paiva. The Tâmega, north to south course, limits much of the County to the west, separating it from the Municipality of Penafiel. Another river that runs along the county is the Ovelha River, reaching from the Municipality of Amarante. The City of Marco de Canaveses is located 56 km away from Porto, 18 km away from Amarante, the 19 km away from Penafiel, 18 km away from Baião and 30 km away from Cinfães.

== Climate ==
Due to its topography, Marco de Canaveses has an unstable and marked climate of extremes, with cold and rigorous winters and relatively hot summers. The coldest season of the year is typically long, with temperatures going often below 0 °C. Fog is also a constant. At this time, daytime temperatures rarely exceed 10 °C, and precipitation that results into the green landscapes of the county, may be a constant. The cold temperatures are more evident in the northern areas of the region, as well as in the Aboboreira and Montedeiras Mountains, where snow is common, registering sometimes freezing temperatures of -10 °C. Although these temperatures can be even lower, but it is not so often. In the city center the temperatures are a bit warmer and snow is not so common. With prevailing winds from west and southwest quadrants, is usually offered heavy rainfall on the higher places, decreasing as the lower slopes to the valleys. During the driest months of summer, temperatures above 30 °C may be recorded, sometimes reaching values near 40 °C. However, pleasant days of summer may be interrupted by constant cloudy weather days and some rain. Regardless of the season, cloudy days are common, being more frequent in the days of winter. The relative humidity is quite high, ranging between 75% and 80%. The intervening days are rare, and temperature differences rather abrupt.

== Parishes ==
Administratively, the municipality is divided into 16 civil parishes (freguesias):

- Alpendorada, Várzea e Torrão
- Avessadas e Rosém
- Banho e Carvalhosa
- Bem Viver
- Constance
- Marco
- Paredes de Viadores e Manhuncelos
- Penhalonga e Paços de Gaiolo
- Sande e São Lourenço do Douro
- Santo Isidoro e Livração
- Soalhães
- Sobretâmega
- Tabuado
- Várzea, Aliviada e Folhada
- Vila Boa de Quires e Maureles
- Vila Boa do Bispo

== Hiking trails ==
There are 7 acknowledged hiking trails throughout Marco de Canaveses:

- PR1 - Pedras, Moinhos e Aromas de Santiago.
- PR2 - Dois Rios, Dois Mosteiros.
- PR3 - Caminho do Rio.
- PR4 - BAO/MCN/ATM Trilho dos Dólmens.
- PR5 - Caminhos de Canaveses.
- PR6 - Caminhos de Tongóbriga.
- PR7 - Aldeias e Margens do Rio Ovelha.

== Notable people ==
- Ângelo da Cunha Pinto (1948–2015) a Portuguese-Brazilian chemist and professor at Rio de Janeiro University
- Carmen Miranda (1909-1955) a Portuguese-Brazilian singer and actress

=== Sport ===
- Rui Casaca (born 1959) a Portuguese former footballer with 326 club caps
- Serafim Vieira (born 1966) a Portuguese former road cyclist.
- Pedro Ricardo Marques Pereira Monteiro (born 1978), known as Pedrinha, a retired footballer with 377 club caps
- António Wesllem Sousa Monteiro (born 1985), known as Wesllem, a footballer with almost 300 club caps
