= Linha da Beira Alta =

Railway line in Portugal

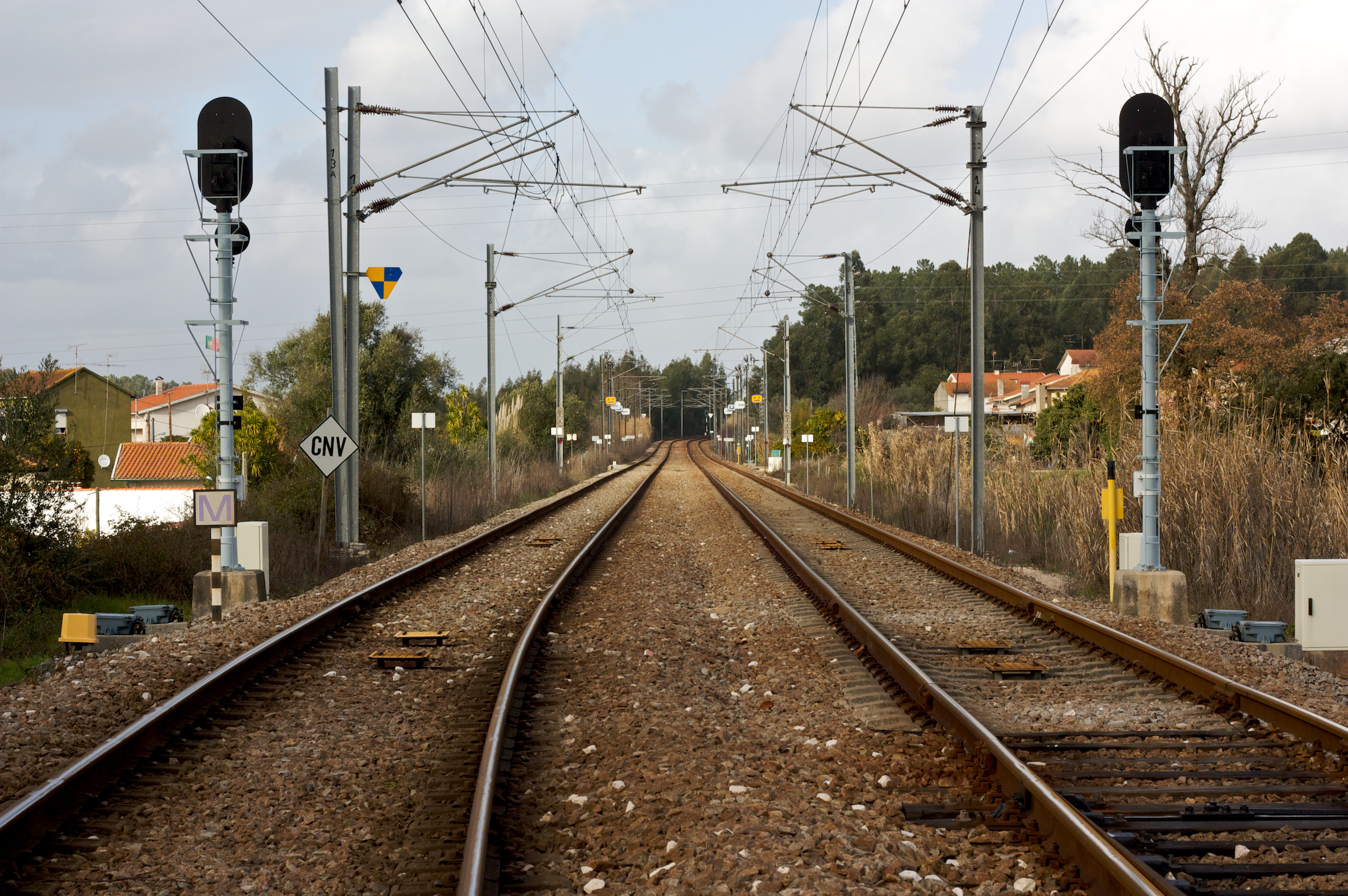
- Linha da Beira Alta close to Pampilhosa.

Overview
- Status: Operational
- Owner: Infraestruturas de Portugal
- Termini: Pampilhosa; Vilar Formoso

Technical
- Line length: 202 km (126 mi)
- Track gauge: Iberian
- Electrification: 25 kV / 50 kHz Overhead line
Route map
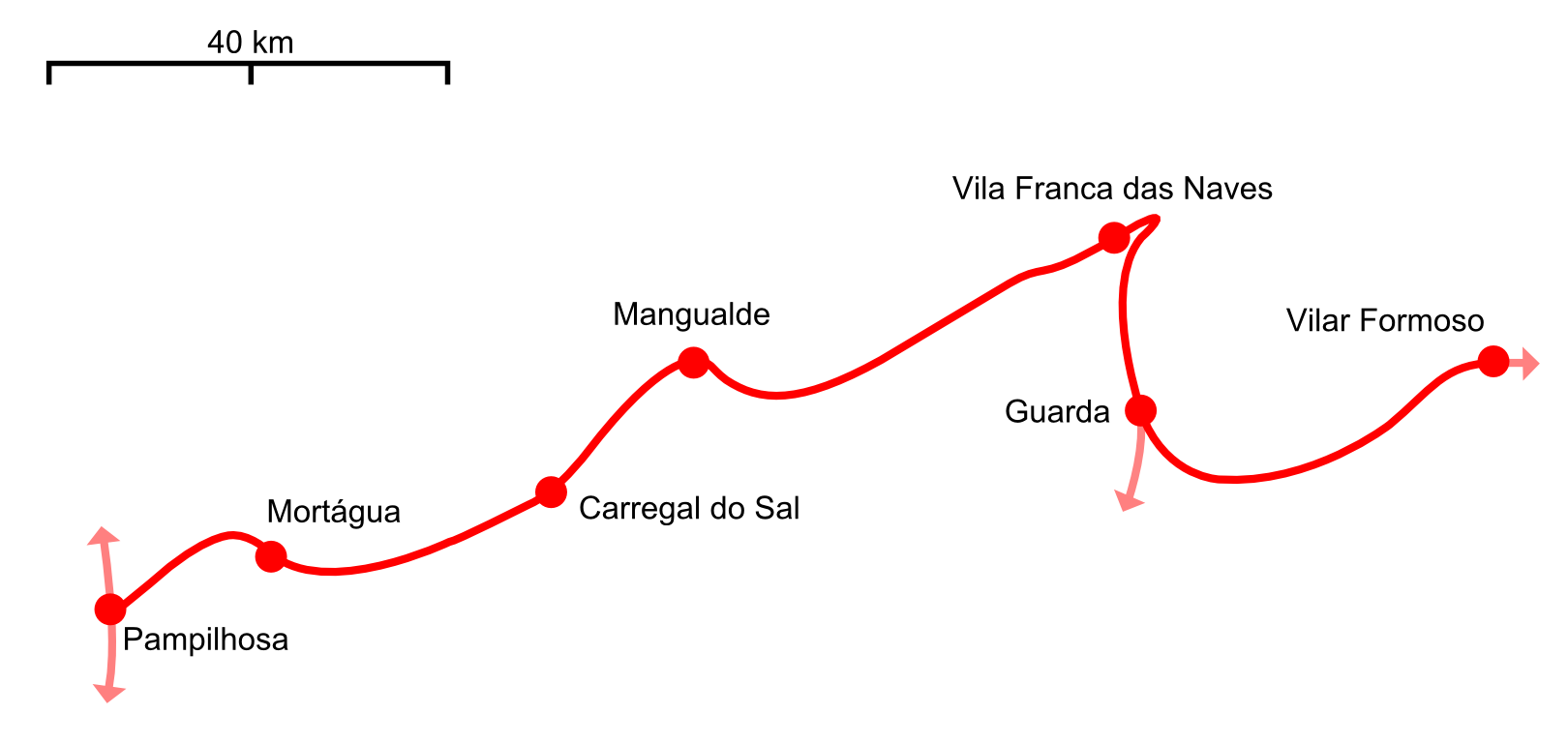

Location on the network
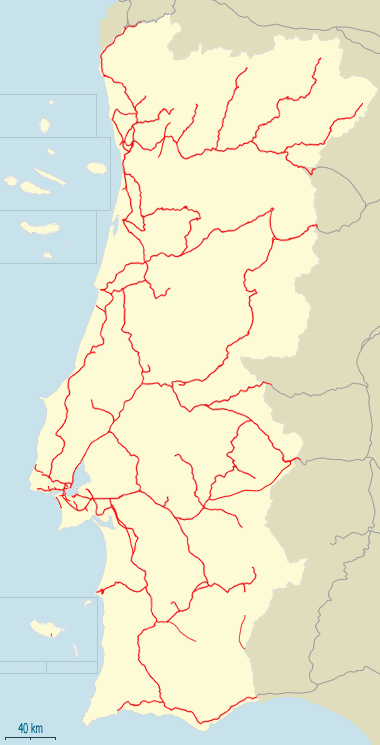

+ Pampilhosa × Vilar Formoso (🔎)

Linha da Beira Alta is an international railway line which connects Pampilhosa on the Linha do Norte, close to Coimbra, to the border with Spain, at Vilar Formoso.

The electrified, mostly single-track, iberian gauge (1,668 m) line runs parallel to the Mondego River. It is the main railway access from Portugal to the rest of Europe. It was constructed by Companhia dos Caminhos de Ferro Portugueses da Beira Alta to open a new international link, closer to Coimbra, and to connect the line to the Port of Figueira da Foz. It was opened on 3 August 1882. During the modernisation and electrification in the 1980s and 90s the signalling and tracks were replaced.

As of June 2023, the entire line is closed for further modernisation work with buses replacing passenger trains. Completion date unknown. The works include construction of a new chord, the Concordância da Mealhada, allowing freight trains from the north to avoid the Pampilhosa area. Level (grade) crossings are to be eliminated and upgraded signalling installed. More information, in Portuguese, at https://www.infraestruturasdeportugal.pt/pt-pt/modernizacao-da-linha-da-beira-alta-2

The line reopened in late 2025.

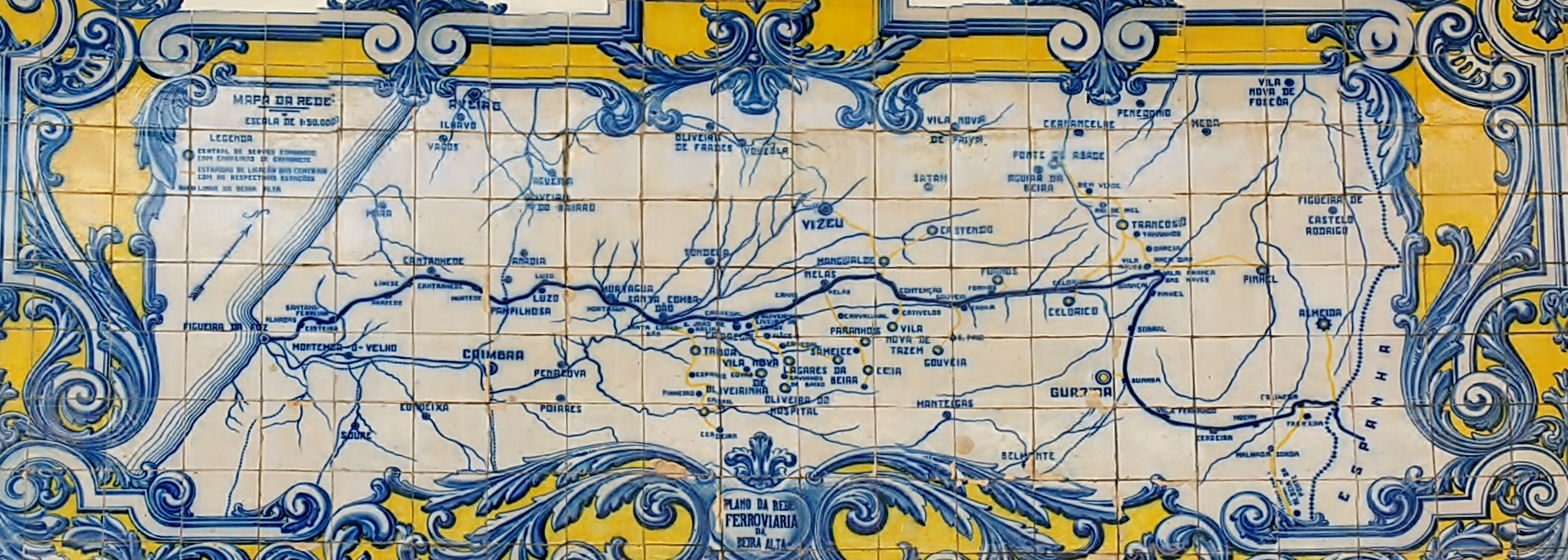
Linha da Beira Alta diagram on azulejos artwork at the Vilar Formoso railway station

== See also ==
- List of railway lines in Portugal
- List of Portuguese locomotives and railcars
- History of rail transport in Portugal
