= La Fuente de San Esteban =

- Municipality
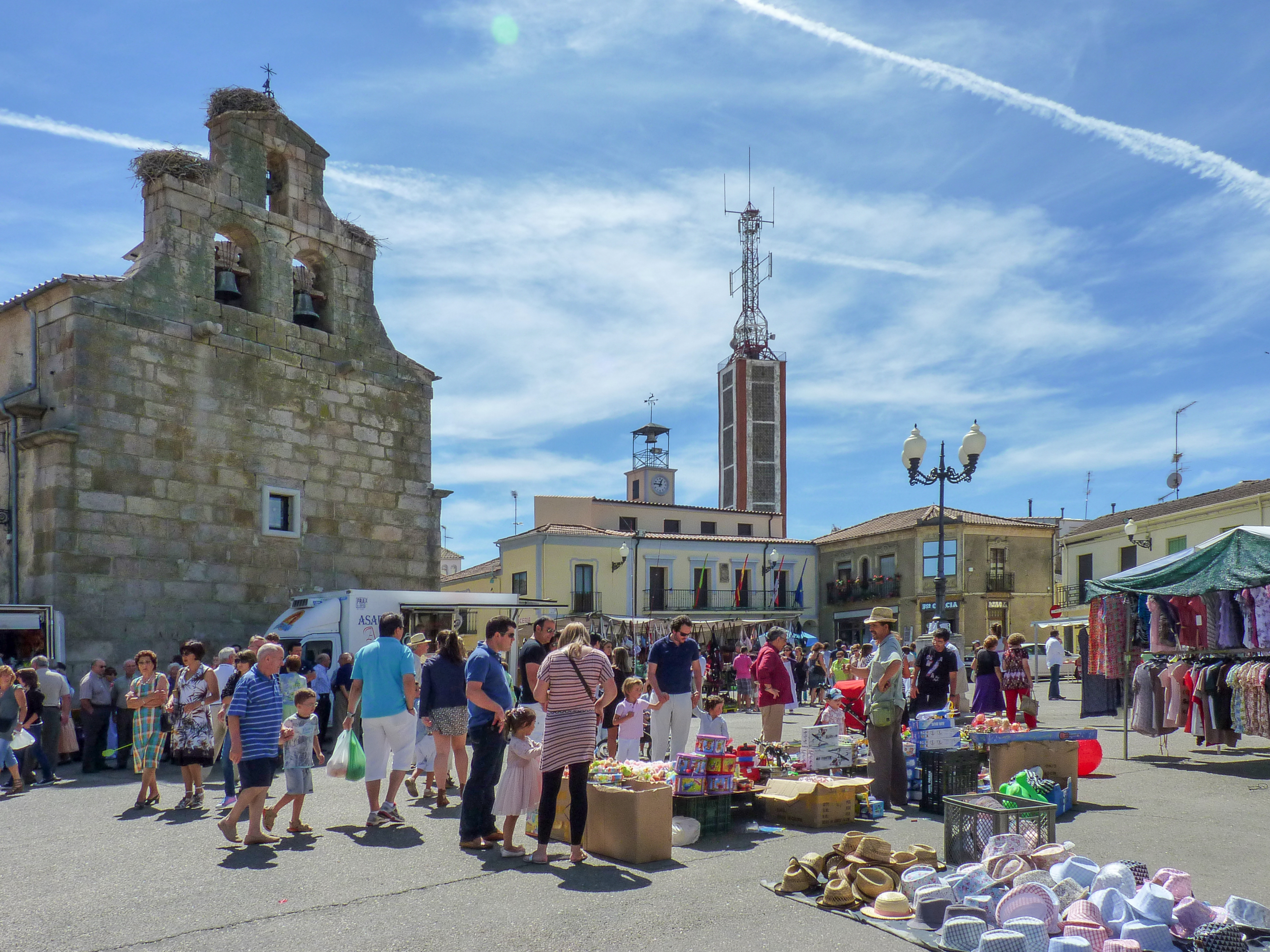
- Town square

- Flag Coat of arms

- Location in Salamanca
- Coordinates: 40°48′1″N 6°15′0″W
- Country: Spain
- Autonomous community: Castile and León
- Province: Salamanca
- Comarca: Comarca de Ciudad Rodrigo
- Subcomarca: Campo del Yeltes

Government
  - Mayor: Manuel Rufino García Núñez (People's Party)

Area
  - Total: 77 km^{2} (30 sq mi)
- Elevation: 770 m (2,530 ft)

Population (2025-01-01)
  - Total: 1,293
  - Density: 17/km^{2} (43/sq mi)
- Time zone: UTC+1 (CET)
  - Summer (DST): UTC+2 (CEST)
- Postal code: 37200

La Fuente de San Esteban is a village and large municipality in the province of Salamanca, western Spain, part of the autonomous community of Castile-Leon. It is located 54 kilometres (34 mi) from the provincial capital city of Salamanca and has a population of 1,358 people.

The town formerly had a direct rail connection to Porto in Portugal via the Douro railway line. The section between La Fuente de San Esteban and the border with Portugal was closed in 1984.

== Geography ==
The municipality covers an area of 77 km^{2} (30 sq mi). It lies 770 metres (2,530 ft) above sea level and the postal code is 37200. The municipality contains the smaller villages of Boadilla (197 people), Muñoz (99 inhabitants) and Santa Olalla de Yeltes.

== See also ==
- List of municipalities in Salamanca
