= List of discontinued railway stations in Portugal =

This is a list of discontinued railway stations and halts in Portugal. The list is incomplete.

Name	Location (city, town, village)	Railway line	Year of closure (or period if unknown)	Image
A
Abela halt				
Abraveses stop				
Adémia halt				
Alcainça-Moinhos halt				
Alcoforado stop				
Aldão-São Torcato halt				
Algeruz halt				
Alhadas halt				
Aljustrel railway station	Aljustrel		Before 2006	
Almancil-Nexe halt				
Almendra railway station				
Alto do Padrão halt				
Alvalade halt				
Alvalede halt				
Alvarelhos halt				
Alvendre halt				
Alvor halt	Alvor		1984–2003	
Amarante railway station				
Amorim halt				
Aranha halt				
Arazede halt				
Arcos halt				
Arneiro stop				
Aroeira halt				
Arraiolos railway station				
Arroteia halt				
Atainde halt				
Atalaia halt				
Avantos halt				
Avenida da França halt				
Azaruja halt				
Azinheira stop				
Azinheira dos Barros - A halt				
Azurara - Árvore halt				
B
Bagaúste halt	Canelas		Before 2008	
Balancho stop				
Banhos de Amieira halt				
Barca d'Alva railway station	Barca d'Alva	Barca d'Alva–La Fuente de San Esteban Line and Douro Line	1988	
Barreiro-Terra halt				
Bebedouro halt				
Benespera halt				
Benfarras halt	Benfarras		Before 2018; Demolished	
Bias halt	Olhão		1954–2018	
Bom Sucesso halt	Lisbon		Before 2013	
Borgal halt				
Bougado halt	Santiago de Bougado		2002	
Bouro halt				
Breda halt				
Breia halt				
Britelo stop				
Bruçó railway station	Bruçó	Sabor Line	1988	
Brunheda halt				
Buraca halt				
C
Cabeção halt				
Cabeço de Vide-Vaiamonte railway station	Cabeço de Vide		1990	
Cabrela halt				
Cachofarra halt				
Camarão halt				
Campilho halt				
Campo halt				
Campo - Serra halt				
Campos halt				
Canedo railway station	Canedo de Basto		1990	
Canha railway station	Canha		2011	
Cantanhede railway station	Cantanhede		2012	
Cardeais halt				
Caria halt	Caria		2009; Reopened in 2021	
Caridade stop				
Carrazedo railway station				
Carriço halt	Carriço		Before 2014	
Carvalhada halt				
Carvalhal halt (Ramal da Figueira da Foz)				
Carvalhal halt (Sabor line)		Sabor Line		
Carvalhosas halt				
Carviçais railway station	Carviçais	Sabor Line	1988	
Carvoeiro halt				
Casal halt	Casal de Cadima		2009	
Casal do Rei halt	Casal do Rei, Canas de Santa Maria		1990	
Casével halt	Casével		Before 2010	
Castanheiro halt				
Castedo halt				
Castelãos halt				
Castelo de Vide railway station	Castelo de Vide		2011	
Castelo Melhor railway station	Castelo Melhor		1988	
Castêlo da Maia railway station	Castêlo da Maia		2002	
Castro Verde-Almodôvar railway station				
Cavalões stop				
Cedrim halt				
Ceira railway station				
Cela halt				
Celorico de Basto railway station				
Cepães halt				
Cerejo halt				
Chanceleiros halt				
Chãos stop				
Chapa halt				
Chaves railway station				
Cigarrosa stop				
Circunvalação halt				
Coa halt	Vila Nova de Foz Côa	Douro Line	1988	
Codeçais halt	Codeçais	Tua line	2008	
Coimbra-Parque halt	Coimbra	Ramal da Lousâ	2010	
Coimbra-Parque halt (old)	Coimbra	Ramal da Lousã	1976–1985; Demolished	
Comenda halt				
Conceição halt (Oeste line)				
Conraria halt				
Cordinhã halt				
Corgo halt	Canelas	Corgo line	2010	
Corte do Poço stop				
Cortiços railway station				
Coruche railway station	Coruche		2009–2017	
Costeira halt				
Cotas halt				
Coura stop				
Coutos halt				
Crestins halt				
Cruz da Pedra halt	Lisbon		1983–2008; Demolished	
Cruzeiro halt				
Cumeadas halt				
Cunheira halt				
Custió-Araújo halt				
Custoias halt				
D
Dafundo halt				
Dalda halt				
Damaia halt				
Diogal halt				
Duas Igrejas - Miranda railway station	Miranda do Douro	Sabor Line	1988	
E
Enxofães halt				
Ermesinde-A halt				
Escoural halt				
Esposado halt				
Estádio Nacional railway station				
Estremoz railway station				
Évora-Monte halt				
F
Fafe railway station	Fafe		1986	
Falcoeiras stop				
Fanhais halt				
Farminhão railway station				
Farreja halt				
Fataunços stop				
Fazenda halt				
Felgar halt	Felgar	Sabor Line	1988	
Fermentãos halt				
Ferradosa railway station				
Fiais da Telha halt				
Figueira halt	Portimão		1985–2003	
Figueirinha halt				
Figueiró railway station				
Fojo stop				
Folhadal halt				
Fontainhas halt				
Fontainhas railway station				
Fonte halt				
Fonte do Prado stop		Sabor Line		
Fonte Nova stop				
Fontela halt				
Fortunho halt				
Fontainhas - Sado halt				
Fonte de Aldeia halt	Vila Chã de Braciosa	Sabor Line	1988	
Fornos - Sabor stop	Fornos	Sabor Line	1988	
Francos halt				
Fregim halt				
Fregim-A stop				
Freixo halt				
Freixo de Espada à Cinta railway station	Freixo de Espada à Cinta	Sabor Line	1988	
Friestas railway station				
Fronteira railway station				
G
Ganfei halt				
Garganta halt				
Garraia halt				
Gatão halt				
Garvão halt				
Gelfa halt				
Gondifelos halt				
Gondivinho halt				
Gouvinhas halt				
Grijó railway station				
Guifões halt				
Gulhe stop				
J
Jafafe stop				
Jardia stop				
Junqueira halt				
L
Lagoa da Palha halt				
Lagoaça railway station	Lagoaça	Sabor Line	1988	
Lameira halt	Silves		1980; Demolished	
Lamelas halt	Torre de Moncorvo	Sabor Line	1988	
Lanhelas railway station				
Lapela halt				
Larinho halt	Larinho	Sabor Line	1988	
Laundos halt				
Lavre railway station				
Leça do Balio railway station				
Leça halt				
Leça railway station				
Leixões-Serpa Pinto railway station				
Leões railway station				
Liceia halt				
Limede-Cadima halt				
Lobazes halt				
Loivos halt				
Louredo halt				
Lourido halt				
Lousã railway station				
Lousã-A halt				
Luzianes railway Station				
M
Maçainhas halt				
Macedo de Cavaleiros railway station				
Machados halt				
Macheia halt				
Macieirinha halt		Sabor Line		
Maiorca halt	Alhadas		2009	
Mala halt				
Mandim halt				
Matosinhos railway station				
Meiral halt				
Meleças halt				
Mindelo railway station				
Mirandela railway station	Mirandela	Tua Line	2009	
Modivas railway station				
Mogadouro railway station	Mogadouro	Sabor Line	1988	
Moinhos halt				
Monção railway station				
Moncorvo railway station	Torre de Moncorvo	Sabor Line	1988	
Mondim de Basto railway station	Mondim de Basto	Tâmega Line	1990	
Montenegro halt				
Montijo railway station				
Mós halt		Sabor Line		
Muro railway station				
Murtede halt				
N
Nagosela halt				
Naia halt				
Nespereira do Vouga stop				
Neves halt				
Noémi railway station				
Nora halt	Vila Nova de Cacela	Algarve Line	1985–2010	
Nuzedo stop				
O
Odiáxere halt	Odiáxere		2003	
Oliveira de Frades railway station				
Ortiga halt				
Oura halt				
Ourique railway station				
Outiz halt				
P
Padrão halt				
Panoias halt				
Pedras Rubras railway station				
Pedras Salgadas railway station				
Pedreira halt				
Pedrouços halt				
Pedrouços da Maia halt				
Pego halt				
Penedo Gordo halt				
Penha halt				
Pereiras halt				
Ponte do Carro halt				
Porto-Boavista railway station				
Portuzelo halt				
Póvoa de Varzim railway station				
Prado halt				
Prilhão-Casais halt				
Q
Quinta da Ponte halt				
Quinta de Água halt	Torre de Moncorvo	Sabor Line	1988	
Quinta Grande railway station				
Quinta Nova halt	Torre de Moncorvo	Sabor Line	1988	
Quintela halt				
Quintos railway station				
R
Ramalde halt				
Rates halt				
Real halt	Real de Baixo		1965	
Regueira de Pontes halt				
Ribeira de Seiça halt				
S
Sabroso halt				
Sanhoane halt	Sanhoane (Mogadouro)	Sabor Line	1988	
Santa Cruz de Benfica halt				
Santa Cruz stop				
Santa Marta halt		Sabor Line		
Santa Vitória-Ervidel railway station				
Santana-Ferreira halt				
Santiago halt				
Santo Aleixo halt				
Santo Isidoro stop				
São Domingos de Benfica halt				
São Félix stop				
São José halt				
São Matias halt				
São Romão-A halt				
Segadães stop				
Seixal railway station				
Sendim railway station	Sendim	Sabor Line	1988	
Senhor dos Aflitos halt				
Senhora das Dores halt				
Silvã-Feiteira halt				
Sines railway station				
Sisto halt				
Sousa da Sé halt				
Souto da Velha halt	Souto da Velha	Sabor Line	1988	
Sura-Padrã halt				
T
Tâmega railway station				
Tanha halt				
Telhada halt				
Telhal halt				
Termas de São Pedro do Sul railway station				
Terrapleno halt				
Tojal railway station				
Tonda railway station				
Tondela railway station				
Tondelinha halt				
Torre da Cardeira stop				
Torre da Gadanha railway station				
Torre Vã railway station				
Torredeita railway station				
Tourencinho stop				
Trajinha halt				
Tralhão halt				
Tralhariz halt				
Travanca-Bodiosa halt				
Travassós de Orgens halt				
Treixedo railway station				
Trémoa halt				
Triana halt				
Old Trofa railway station				
Troviscoso stop				
U
Urgeiriça halt				
Urrós halt	Urrós (Mogadouro)	Sabor Line	1988	
V
Valbom stop				
Vale de Açor halt				
Variz railway station	Variz, Penas Roias	Sabor Line	1988	
Verdoejo halt				
Vila Azedo stop				
Vila Caiz railway station				
Vila Chã halt				
Vila Cova halt				
Vila do Conde railway station				
Vila Pouca de Aguiar railway station				
Vila Real de Santo António - Guadiana railway station				
Vila Real railway station	Vila Real		2009	
Vilar de Rei halt	Vilar de Rei	Sabor Line	1988	
Vilar do Pinheiro railway station				
Vilarinha halt				
Vouzela railway station				
Z
Zimão railway station				
Zimbro halt	Torre de Moncorvo	Sabor Line	1988	
