= Bruçó railway station =

Closed railway station in Bruçó, Portugal

Bruçó railway station Estação Ferroviária de Bruçó
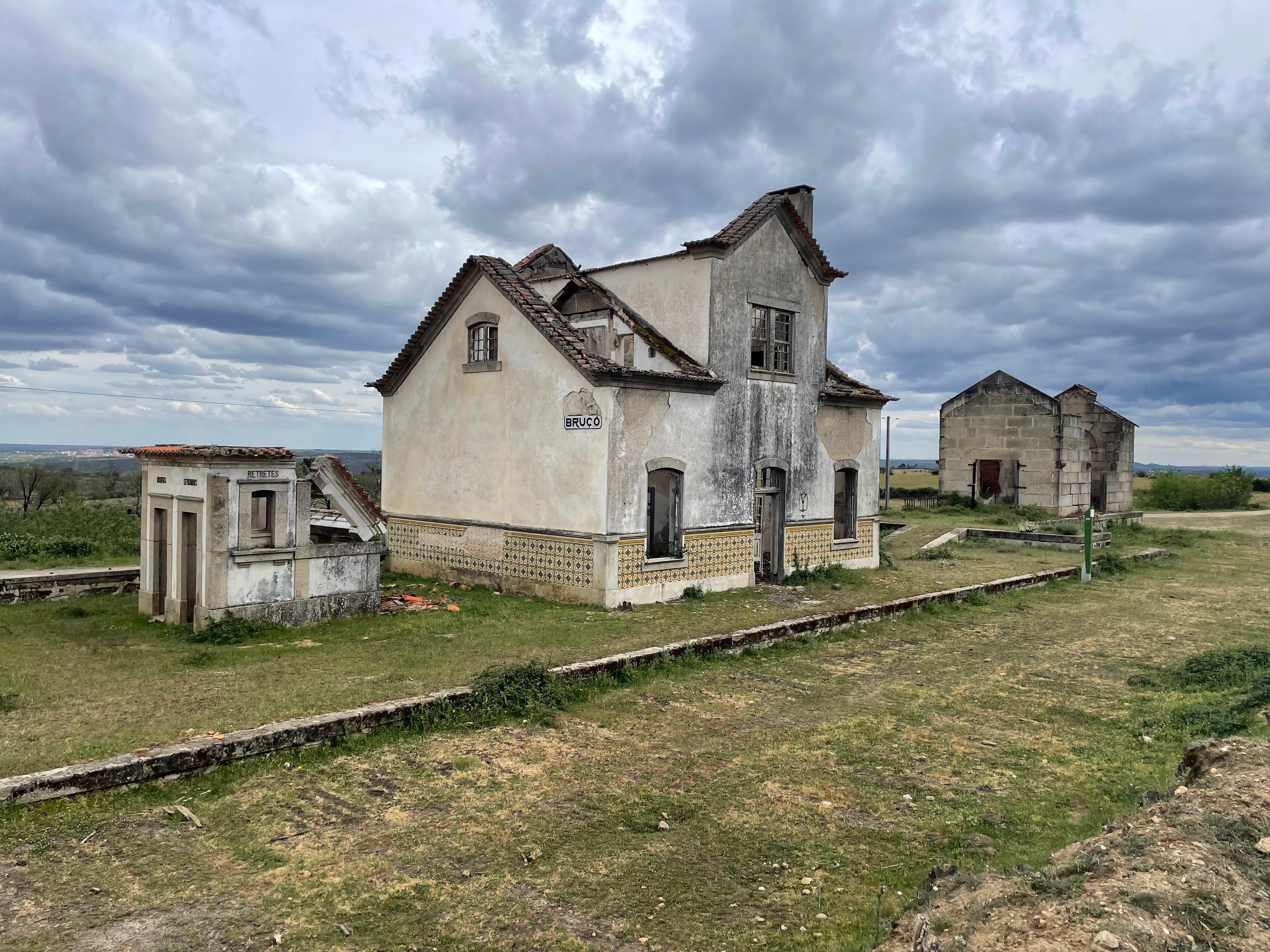
- Bruçó railway station in April 2023

General information
- Location: Bruçó, Mogadouro; Portugal
- Coordinates: 41°15′5.22″N 6°41′50.07″W
- Line: Sabor line (1930-1988)
- Distance: Pocinho - 58.7km; Mogadouro - 13.9km; Duas Igrejas - Miranda - 46.6km
- Connections: Vilar de Rei; Santa Marta

History
- Opened: 1 June 1930
- Closed: 1 August 1988
Location
- Location within Portugal

The Bruçó railway station, originally called Bruçô, was a station on the Sabor line, which served the town of Bruçó, in the Bragança District of Portugal.

== Description ==
The remains of the station are located northwest of the town of Bruçó, and can be accessed by road via the EM596, and from there via the EM596-1 over a distance of 2.3 km (with an incline of +10-70 m). The passenger building was located on the right-hand side of the uphill track (towards the Duas Igrejas - Miranda railway station).

== History ==
=== Construction and inauguration ===
On February 16, 1908, the Gazeta dos Caminhos de Ferro reported that the plan for the section between Carviçais and Bruçó on the Sabor Line would be presented to the Superior Council of Public Works.

On 1 July 1926, the Gazeta dos Caminhos de Ferro reported that work on the Carviçais section of the Sabor Line was about to resume, after a long period of inactivity; at that time, several stations had already been completed for some years, including Bruçó (then named Bruçô). On 1 June 1930, the section between Lagoaça and Mogadouro, where the Bruçó station was located, opened.

In January 1933, houses started being built to house the porters, which were completed the following year.

=== Closure and abandonment ===
The Sabor line was closed on 1 August 1988, leaving the Bruçó railway station abandoned permanently.

== See also ==
- Sabor line
- Rail transport in Portugal
- History of rail transport in Portugal

== Bibliography ==
- Reis, Francisco Cardoso dos; Gomes, Rosa Maria; Gomes, Gilberto; et al. (2006). Os Caminhos de Ferro Portugueses 1856-2006. Lisboa: CP-Comboios de Portugal e Público-Comunicação Social S. A. p. 238. ISBN 989-619-078-X.
