= Sanhoane halt =

Closed halt in northern Portugal

Sanhoane halt Apeadeiro de Sanhoane

General information
- Location: Sanhoane (Mogadouro); Portugal
- Coordinates: 41°21′54″N 6°34′17.3″W
- Line: Sabor line (1938-1988)
- Distance: Pocinho - 26.9km; Mogadouro - 45.65km; Duas Igrejas - Miranda - 78.39km
- Connections: Urrós; Variz

History
- Opened: 22 May 1938
- Closed: 1 August 1988
Location
- Location within Portugal

The Sanhoane halt, originally called Sanhoane stop, was a station on the Sabor line that served the town of Sanhoane, in the municipality of Mogadouro, Portugal.

== History ==
This halt (previously ranked as a railway stop) was located on the section of the Sabor line between Mogadouro railway station and Duas Igrejas - Miranda railway station, which was opened for operation on 22 May 1938.

The Sabor line and consequently the halt, were closed on 1 August 1988.

== See also ==
- Rail transport in Portugal
- History of rail transport in Portugal
