= Felgar halt =

Closed halt in northeast Portugal

Felgar halt Apeadeiro de Felgar
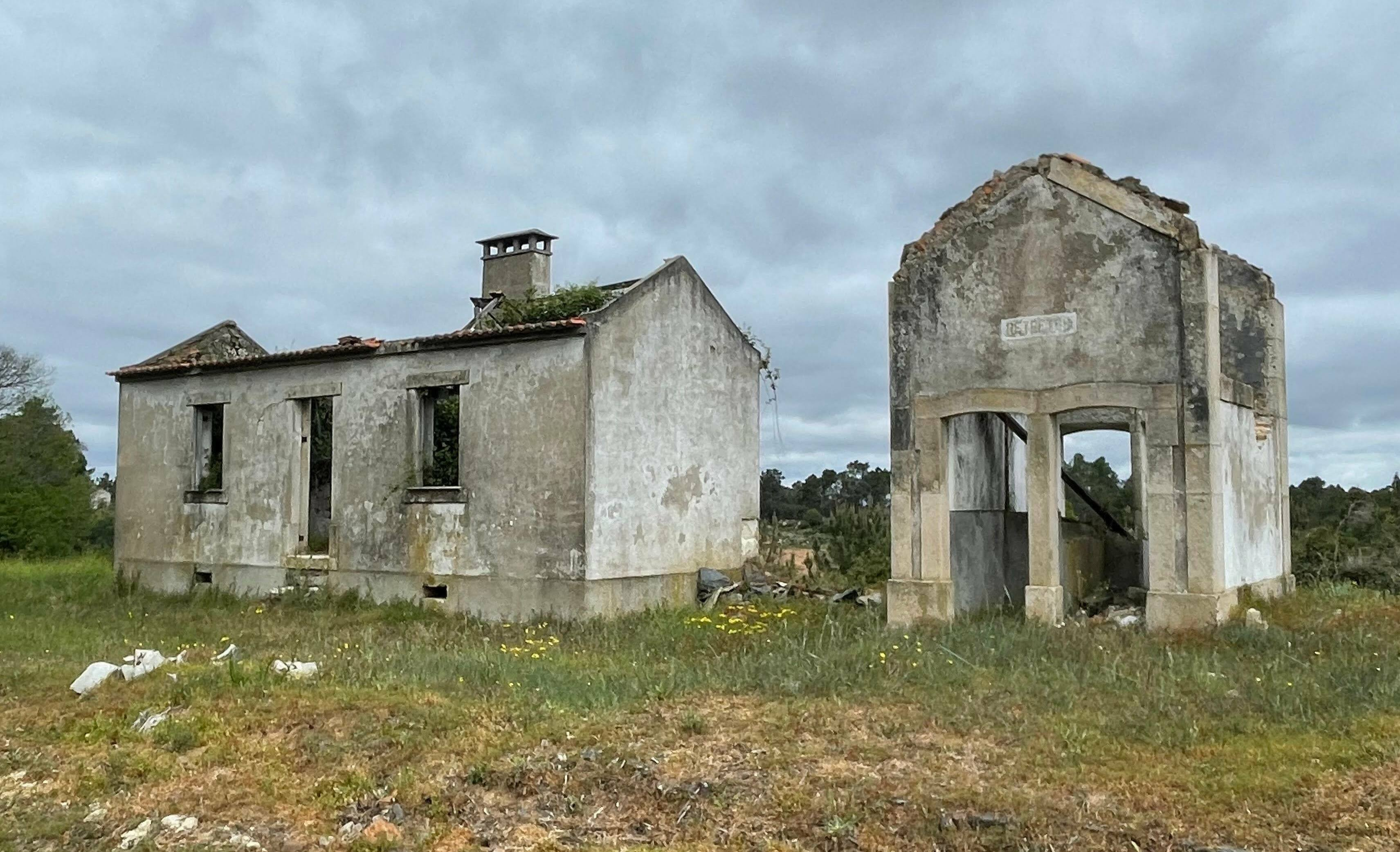
- The Felgar halt in April 2023

General information
- Location: Felgar, Torre de Moncorvo; Portugal
- Coordinates: 41.20235°N 6.95577°W
- Line: Sabor line (1911-1988)
- Distance: Pocinho - 25.4km; Mogadouro - 47.1km; Duas Igrejas - Miranda - 79.9km
- Connections: Souto da Velha halt; Carvalhal halt

Other information
- Website: https://www.infraestruturasdeportugal.pt/negocios-e-servicos/horarios

History
- Opened: 17 September 1911
- Closed: 1 August 1988
Location
- Location within Portugal

The Felgar halt (Portuguese: Apeadeiro de Felgar) once stood as a crucial stop of the Sabor Line, since it connected and served the town of Felgar and surrounding areas with the rest of the country via train.

The Felgar halt is officially documented in the Direção-Geral do Património Cultural, within the SIPA department (Architectural Heritage Information System).

== History ==
The Felgar halt was situated on the section of the Sabor Line running between Pocinho and Carviçais, inaugurated on 17 September, 1911. The line, along with the halt, ceased operations in the first day of August of 1988.

== See also ==
- Sabor line
- Comboios de Portugal
- Rail transport in Portugal
- History of rail transport in Portugal
- Infraestruturas de Portugal

== Bibliography ==
- REIS, Francisco; GOMES, Rosa; GOMES, Gilberto; et al. (2006). Os Caminhos de Ferro Portugueses 1856-2006. Lisboa: CP-Comboios de Portugal e Público-Comunicação Social S. A. p. 238. ISBN 989-619-078-X.
- DAVIES, W. (1998). Narrow Gauge Railways of Portugal [Os Caminhos de Ferro de Via Estreita em Portugal]. Norfolk: Plateway Press.
