= Fonte de Aldeia halt =

Closed halt in northeast Portugal

Fonte de Aldeia halt Apeadeiro de Fonte de Aldeia
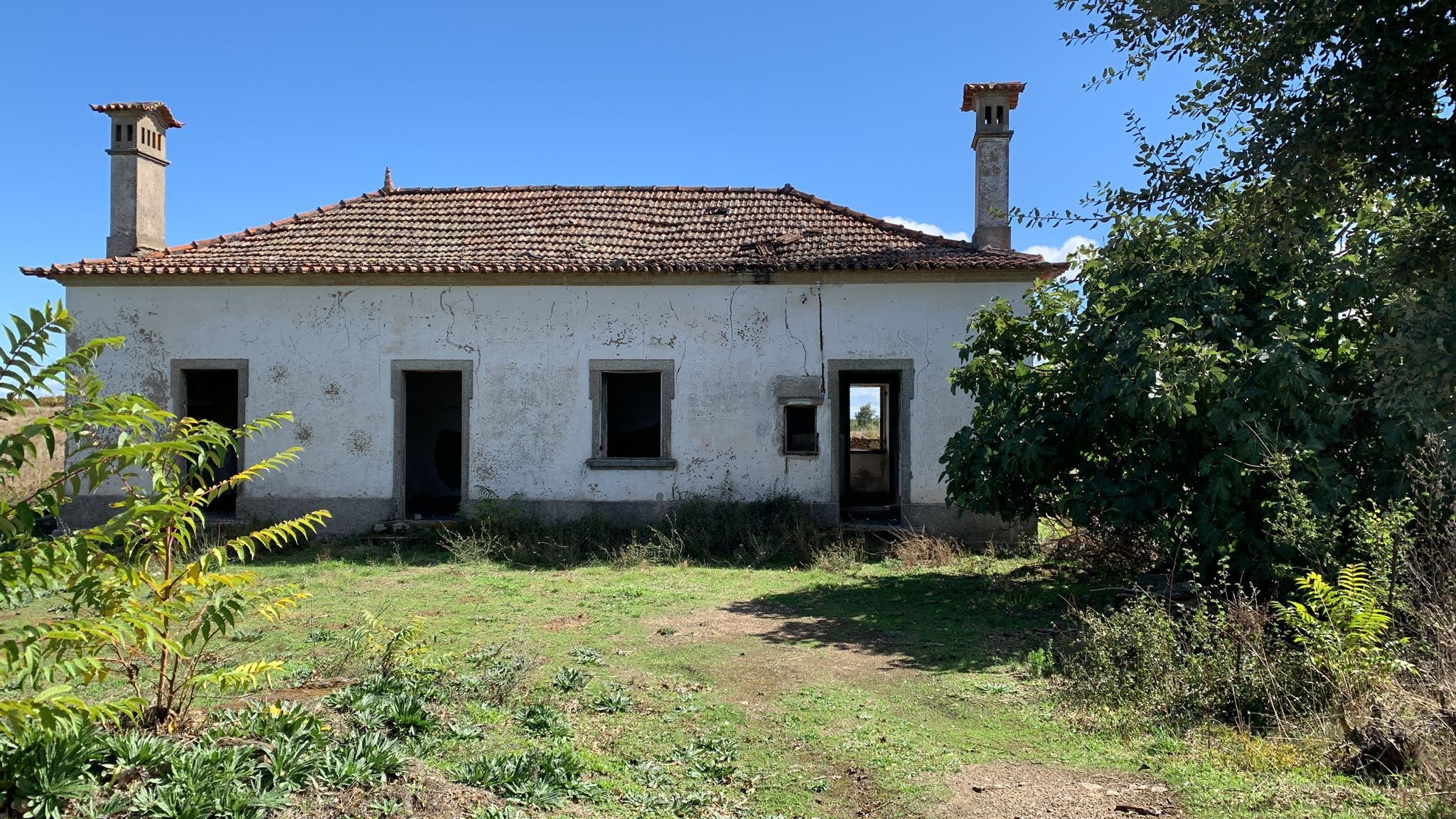
- Fonte de Aldeia halt, 2021

General information
- Location: Vila Chã de Braciosa, Miranda do Douro; Portugal
- Coordinates: 41°26′6.73″N 6°24′23.94″W
- Line: Sabor line (1938-1988)
- Distance: Pocinho - 99.68km; Mogadouro - 27.13km; Duas Igrejas - Miranda - 5.61km
- Connections: Duas Igrejas - Miranda; Sendim

History
- Opened: 22 May 1938
- Closed: 1 August 1988
Location
- Location within Portugal

The Fonte de Aldeia halt, originally called Fonte de Aldeia stop, was a station on the Sabor line that served the town of Fonte de Aldeia, in the municipality of Miranda do Douro, Portugal.

== History ==
=== Building and inauguration ===
This station was located on the stretch between Mogadouro and Duas Igrejas - Miranda, which was inaugurated on 22 May 1938. A decree from the Ministry of Public Works and Communications, published in Diário do Governo no. 258, Series II, of 4 November 1937, approved the project for the Fonte da Aldeia stop, between sections 353 and 358 of the section between Urrós and Duas Igrejas - Miranda, and the respective budget, in the amount of 15,746$00.

=== Closing ===
The Sabor line was closed on 1 August 1988, consequently leading to the closure of the Fonte de Aldeia halt.

== See also ==
- Sabor line
- Rail transport in Portugal
- History of rail transport in Portugal

== Bibliography ==
- REIS, Francisco; GOMES, Rosa; GOMES, Gilberto; et al. (2006). Os Caminhos de Ferro Portugueses 1856-2006. Lisboa: CP-Comboios de Portugal e Público-Comunicação Social S. A. p. 238. ISBN 989-619-078-X.
