= Sendim railway station =

Former railway station in northeast Portugal

Sendim railway station Estação Ferroviária de Sendim
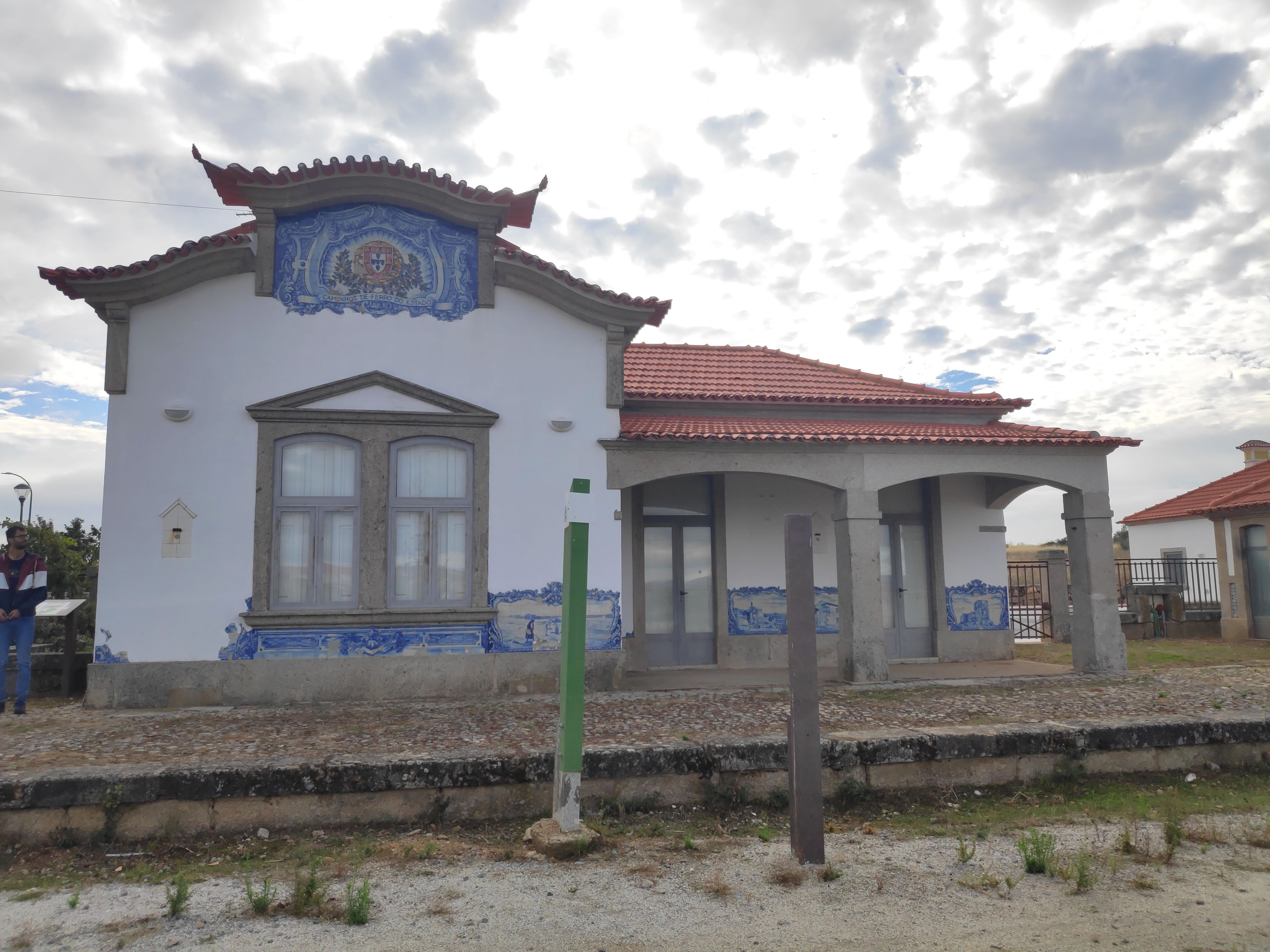
- The restored Sendim railway station in October 2021

General information
- Location: Sendim; Portugal
- Coordinates: 41.39609°N 6.44248°W
- Line: Sabor line (1938-1988)
- Distance: Pocinho - 94km; Mogadouro - 21.5km; Duas Igrejas - Miranda - 11.3km
- Connections: Fonte de Aldeia halt; Urrós halt

Other information
- Website: "Horários dos comboios em tempo real | Infraestruturas de Portugal". www.infraestruturasdeportugal.pt.

History
- Opened: 22 May 1938
- Closed: 1 August 1988
Location
- Location within Portugal

The Sendim railway station once operated as a stop along the Sabor line, serving the town of Sendim in the Bragança District of Portugal.

== History ==
=== Construction and inauguration ===
At the meeting of the Council of Ministers on 10 January 1934, the draft contract for contract no. 3 of the Sabor Line was ratified, which included the construction of the section between Urrós and Duas Igrejas - Miranda. This work included the installation of the Sendim station, with telephone communications and an access road. This interface was located between Mogadouro and Duas Igrejas - Miranda.

This interface was opened for operation on 22 May 1938.

=== Closure ===
The closure of the Sabor Line on 1 August 1988 led to the subsequent closure of Sendim railway station.

=== Aftermath ===
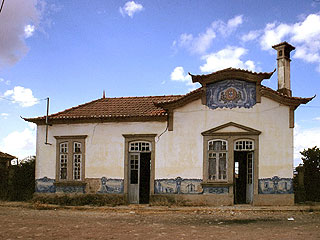
The Sendim railway station in 1995

The station is celebrated for its distinctive azulejos, some of which unfortunately fell victim to acts of vandalism, resulting in breakage. Recently recognized for their historical significance, the azulejos have been officially designated as historical artifacts by the Infraestruturas de Portugal. Moreover, these precious tiles are safeguarded under the SOS Azulejo program, with protection provided by the Polícia Judiciária.

In 2011 the Sendim railway station was officially documented in the Direção-Geral do Património Cultural, within the SIPA department (Architectural Heritage Information System).

After continuous protests made by the youth of Sendim, in 2014 the station and its prized azulejos finally underwent a meticulous restoration process after 26 years of abandonment, a project that costed a total of 81,189 euros. This restoration initiative aimed not only to preserve the historical integrity of the station but also to ensure the longevity of the remaining azulejos.

== Description ==
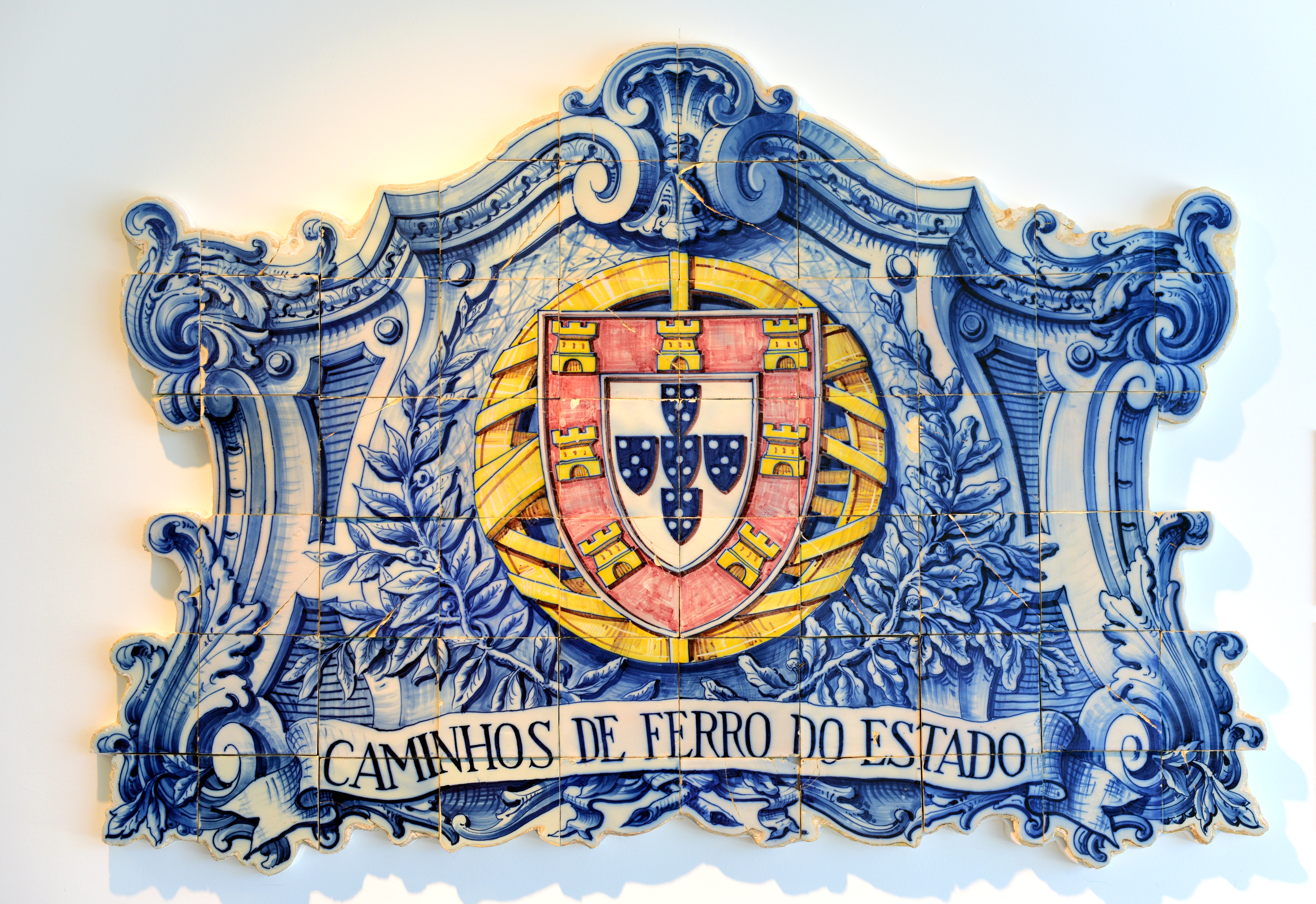
The azulejos that originally adorned the summit of the Urrós halt, currently exhibited in a museum. These tiles are identical to the ones still in place at the Sendim station.

The Sendim railway station consists of the passenger building, a covered pier, a toilet building and a staff housing and water tank building. The passenger building has a rectangular floor plan and single-storey façades, ending in a cornice and simple eaves, plastered and painted white, with eleven blue and white figurative tile panels depicting monuments from the region, landscapes and country scenes from the period, panels under the openings, a polychrome panel with the coat of arms of Portugal and two toponymic panels. The main façade faces east. The interior is divided into two unequal areas: the smaller one to the north, corresponding to the stationmaster's room, and the one to the south, corresponding to the public area, with a porch and waiting room, and the service area, with a telegraph office, ticket office and dispatch area. The walls are covered in polychrome azulejos made by Gilberto Renda.

== See also ==
- Sabor line
- Infraestruturas de Portugal
- Rail transport in Portugal
- History of rail transport in Portugal
- Comboios de Portugal

== Bibliography ==
- Reis, Francisco; Gomes, Rosa; Gomes, Gilberto; et al. (2006). Os Caminhos de Ferro Portugueses 1856-2006. Lisboa: CP-Comboios de Portugal e Público-Comunicação Social S. A. p. 238. ISBN 989-619-078-X.
- Davies, W. (1998). Narrow Gauge Railways of Portugal [Os Caminhos de Ferro de Via Estreita em Portugal]. Norfolk: Plateway Press.
