= Variz railway station =

Closed train station in northeast Portugal

Variz railway station Estação Ferroviária de Variz
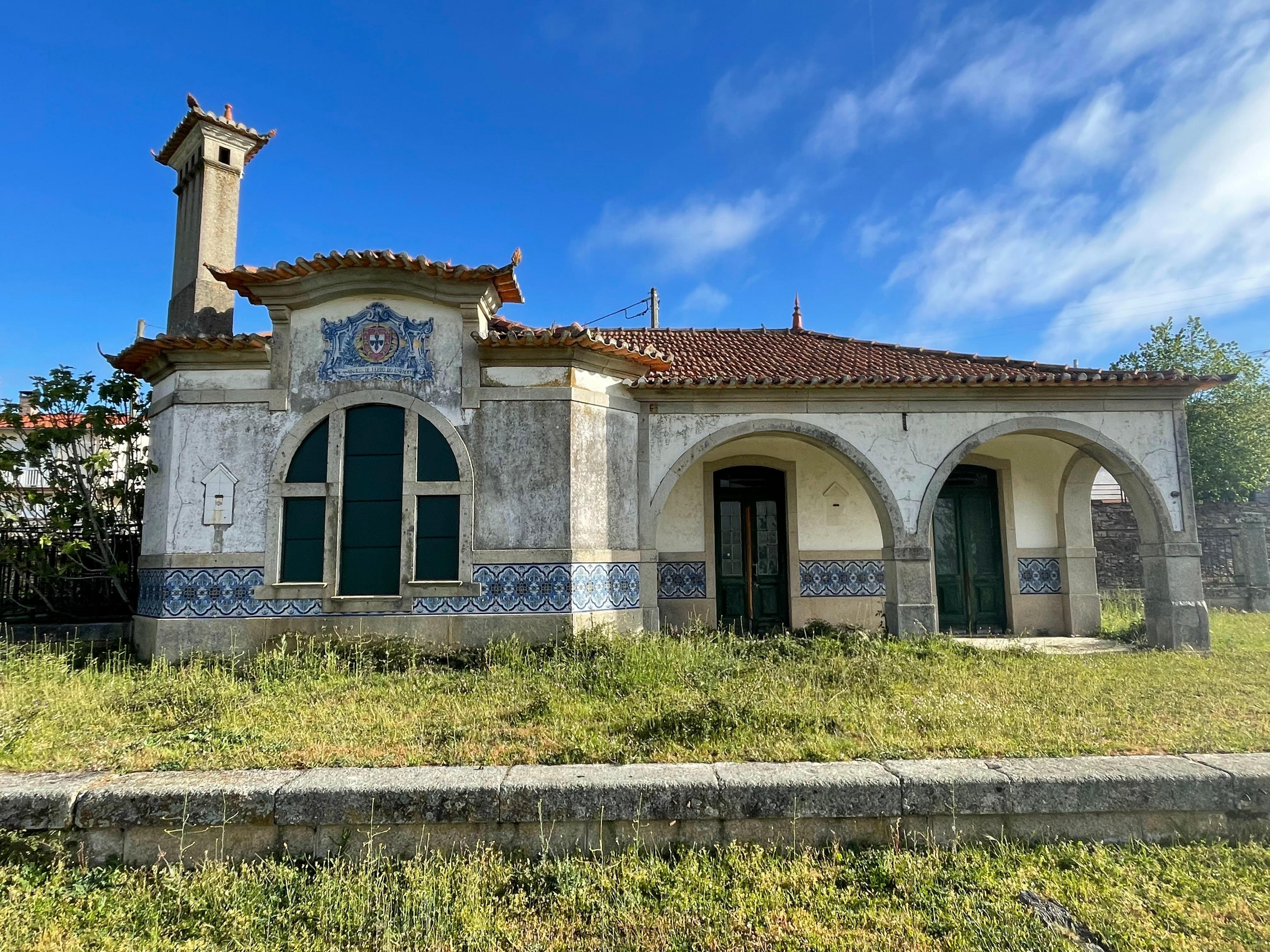
- The Variz railway station in April 2023

General information
- Location: Variz, Penas Roias; Portugal
- Coordinates: 41.36405°N 6.60746°W
- Line: Sabor line (1938-1988)
- Distance: Pocinho - 78km; Mogadouro - 5.5km; Duas Igrejas - Miranda - 27.3km
- Connections: Sanhoane; Mogadouro

History
- Opened: 22 May 1938
- Closed: 1 August 1988
Location
- Location within Portugal

The Variz railway station was a station of the Sabor line, located in the town of Variz, in the parish of Penas Roias, in the municipality of Mogadouro, Portugal.

== History ==
=== Construction and inauguration ===
In Series II of Diário do Governo no. 33, of 10 February 1938, a decree was published approving the final acceptance of contract no. 2 for the Sabor Line, executed by the Companhia Geral de Construção. This project included, among other works, the construction of the Variz railway station (at the time a halt), which consisted of a passenger building (located on the north side of the track), a toilet, a platform, fences, a depot, a quay for goods with the corresponding top track, and a second carriageway. This contract also included the installation of the telephone network between Mogadouro and Urrós, serving Variz. The section between Mogadouro and Duas Igrejas - Miranda was opened for operation on 22 May 1938.

A decree published in Diário do Governo no. 203, Series II, of 1 September 1938, ordered the signing of a contract with José Teixeira de Magalhães to carry out contract no. 4 on the Sabor line, which consisted of paving the area around the Variz station, already promoted from the status of halt.

=== Closure ===
The Variz railway station ceased operations as a direct consequence of the closure of the Sabor line on August 1, 1988.

== See also ==
- Sabor line
- Rail transport in Portugal
- History of rail transport in Portugal

== Bibliography ==
- REIS, Francisco; GOMES, Rosa; GOMES, Gilberto; et al. (2006). Os Caminhos de Ferro Portugueses 1856-2006. Lisboa: CP-Comboios de Portugal e Público-Comunicação Social S. A. p. 238. ISBN 989-619-078-X.
