= Vilar de Rei halt =

Closed halt in northeast Portugal

Vilar de Rei halt Apeadeiro de Vilar de Rei
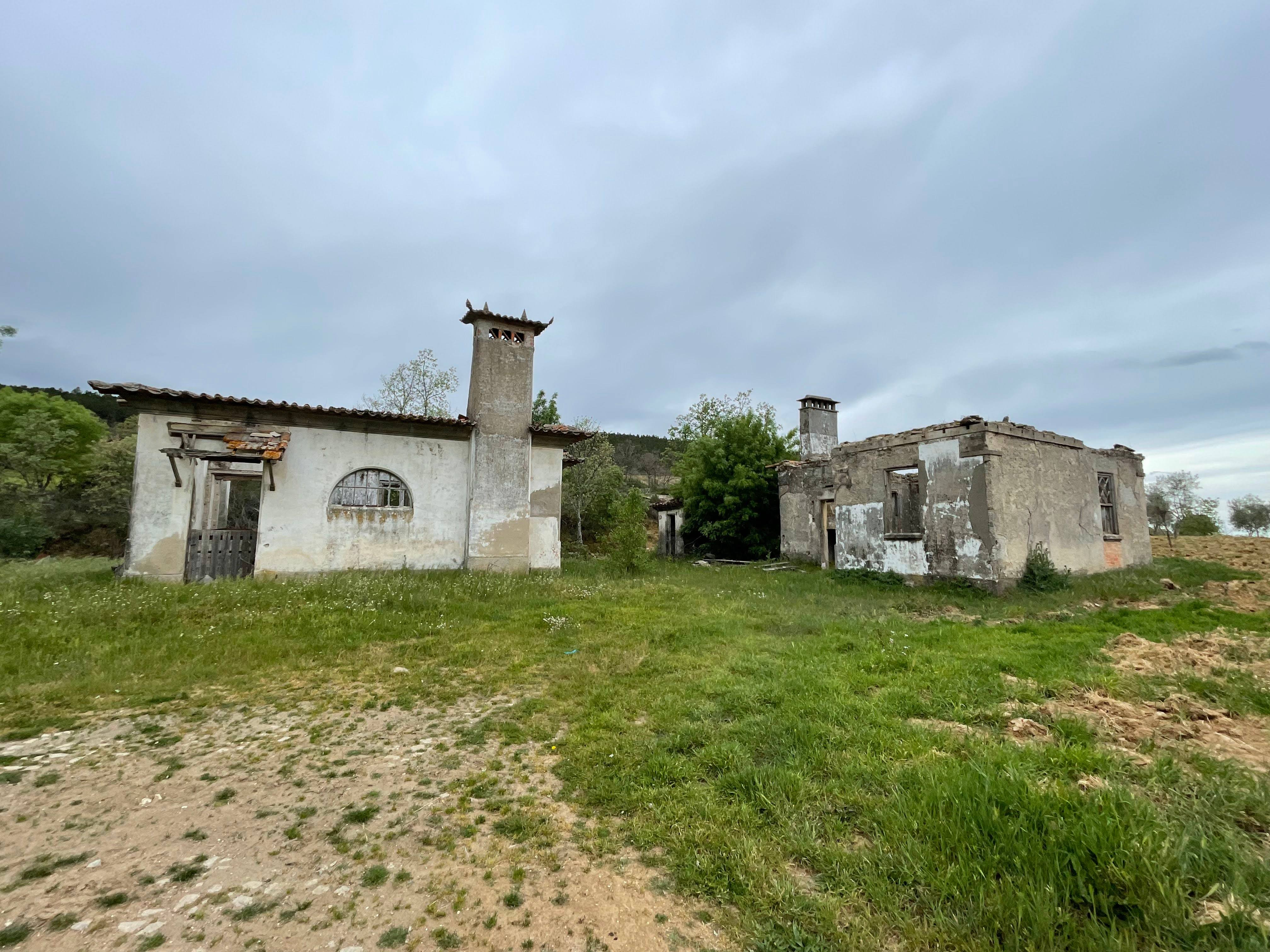
- Vilar de Rei halt in 2023

General information
- Other names: Vilar do Rei halt
- Location: Vilar de Rei, Mogadouro; Portugal
- Coordinates: 41°18′35.74″N 6°40′37.12″W
- Line: Sabor line (1930-1988)
- Distance: Pocinho - 68.805km; Mogadouro - 3.75km; Duas Igrejas - Miranda - 36.49km
- Connections: Mogadouro; Bruçó

History
- Opened: 1 June 1930
- Closed: 1 August 1988
Location
- Location within Portugal

The Vilar de Rei halt was an interface of the Sabor line, which served the town of Vilar de Rei, in the municipality of Mogadouro, in Portugal.

== History ==
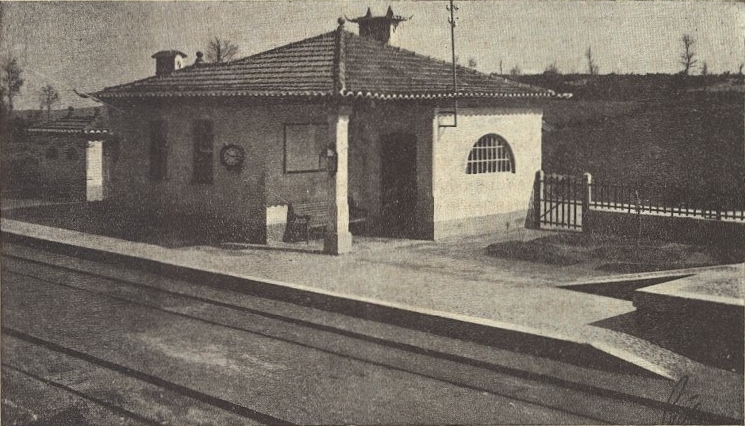
The Vilar de Rei interface in 1935, still with the category of station instead of halt.

This stop was part of the section of the Sabor Line between Lagoaça and Mogadouro, which opened for operation on 1 June 1930. In August 1932, the Companhia Nacional de Caminhos de Ferro began building housing for porters and a covered quay for goods at this interface, which had the category of station at the time, these works were almost finished by the beginning of the following year.

The Sabor line was closed on 1 August 1988, and so did the Vilar de Rei halt.

== See also ==
- Sabor line
- Rail transport in Portugal
- History of rail transport in Portugal

== Bibliography ==
- REIS, Francisco; GOMES, Rosa; GOMES, Gilberto; et al. (2006). Os Caminhos de Ferro Portugueses 1856-2006. Lisboa: CP-Comboios de Portugal e Público-Comunicação Social S. A. p. 238. ISBN 989-619-078-X.
