= Maiorca halt =

Closed halt in Portugal

Coordinates: 40.1752°N 8.7949°W

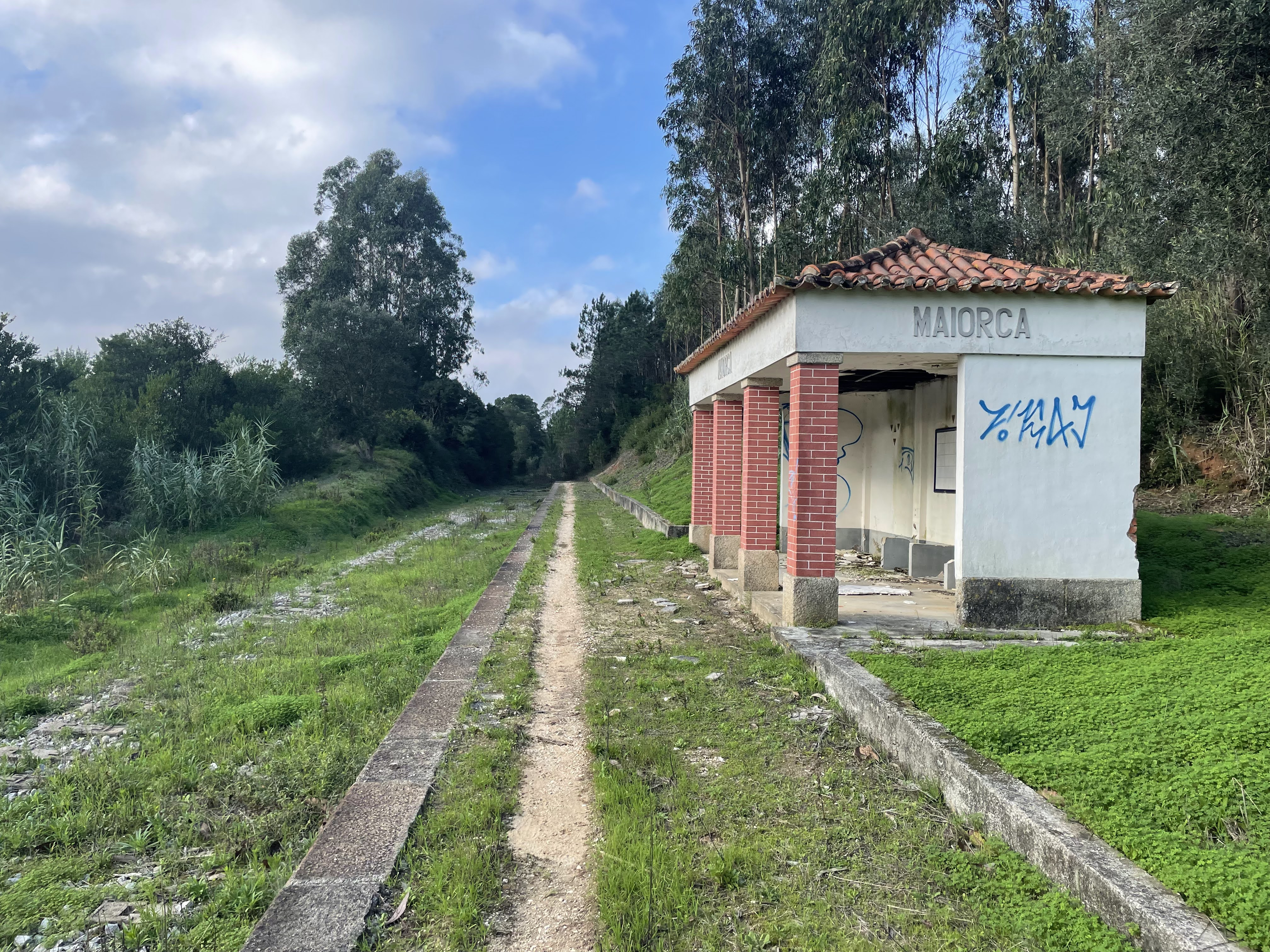
The Maiorca halt, November 2023

The Maiorca halt was a railway halt of the shut down Ramal da Figueira da Foz, which served the town of Maiorca, Coimbra, Portugal, and closed in 2009.

== History ==
=== Inauguration ===
This interface is located on the section between Figueira da Foz and Vilar Formoso, which was inaugurated on 3 August 1882 by the Companhia dos Caminhos de Ferro Portugueses da Beira Alta. The Maiorca halt was not among the stations and halts on the line at the time of its inauguration, but this interface was created at a later date.

=== Closure ===
On 5 January 2009, the Figueira da Foz branch line was closed to rail traffic for alleged safety reasons. Comboios de Portugal organised a replacement road service, which was completed on 1 January 2012.

As of 2023, the Maiorca halt shows visible signs of vandalism and some signs of structural decay.

== See also ==
- Ramal da Figueira da Foz
- History of rail transport in Portugal
- Comboios de Portugal

== Bibliography ==
- REIS, Francisco; GOMES, Rosa; GOMES, Gilberto; et al. (2006). Os Caminhos de Ferro Portugueses 1856-2006. Lisboa: CP-Comboios de Portugal e Público-Comunicação Social S. A. p. 238. ISBN 989-619-078-X.

[[Category:Disused railway stations in Portugal]]
