= Nora halt =

Closed halt in southeast Portugal

Nora halt Apeadeiro de Nora
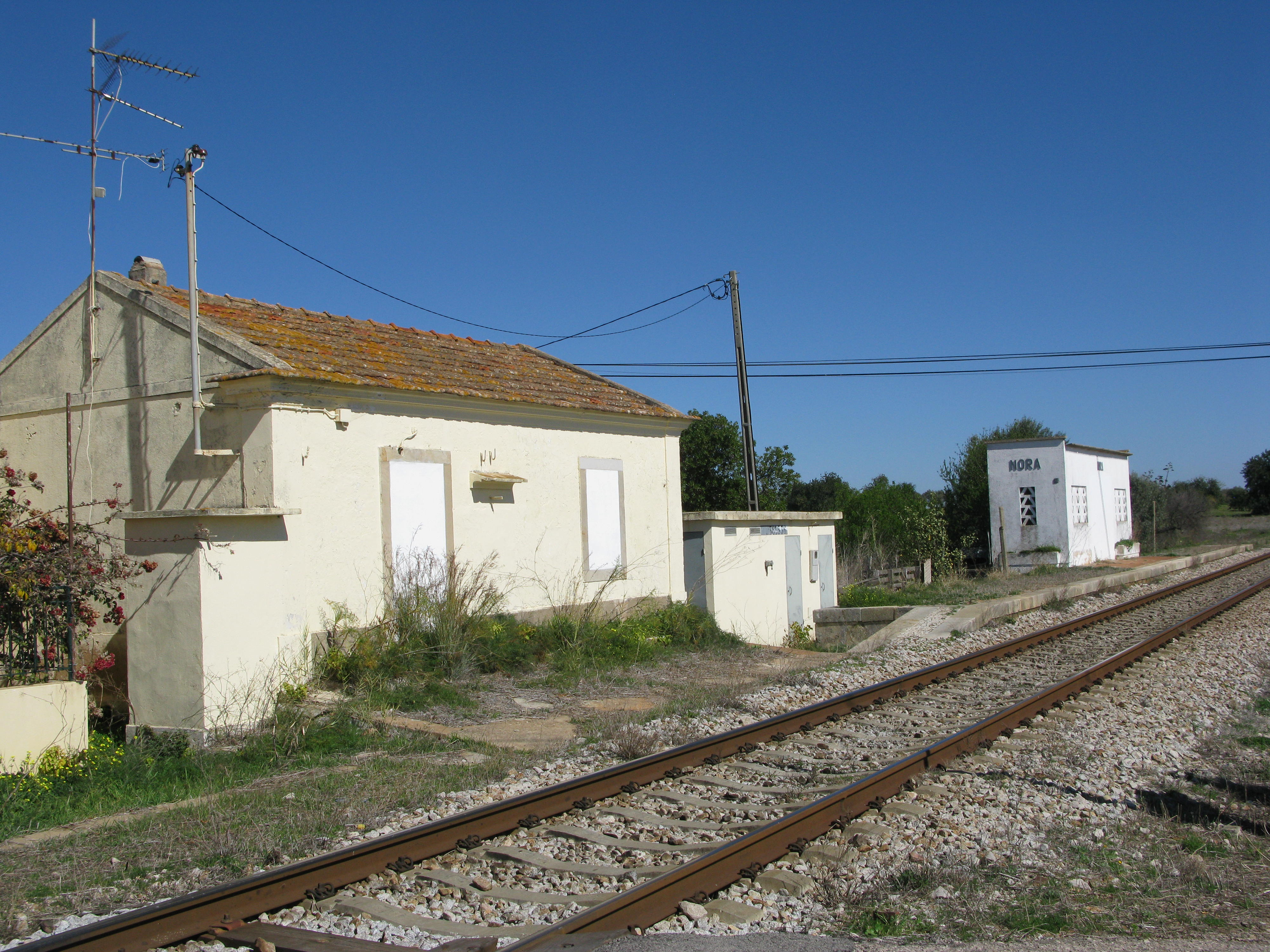
- Nora halt in 2018

General information
- Location: Vila Nova de Cacela, Vila Real de Santo António; Portugal
- Coordinates: 37°10′6.96″N 7°33′51.77″W
- Elevation: 40 m (130 ft)
- Line: Algarve line
- Connections: Santa Rita; Cacela

Other information
- Status: Permanently closed

History
- Opened: 14 April 1906; 120 years ago
- Closed: Between 1985-2010
Location
- Location within Portugal

The Nora halt (name previously spelled as Nóra) is a closed interface of the Algarve line, which used to serve the town of Nora, in the municipality of Vila Real de Santo António, in Portugal.

== Description ==
The platform shelter was located on the north side of the track (right-hand side of the upstream direction, the Vila Real de Santo António).

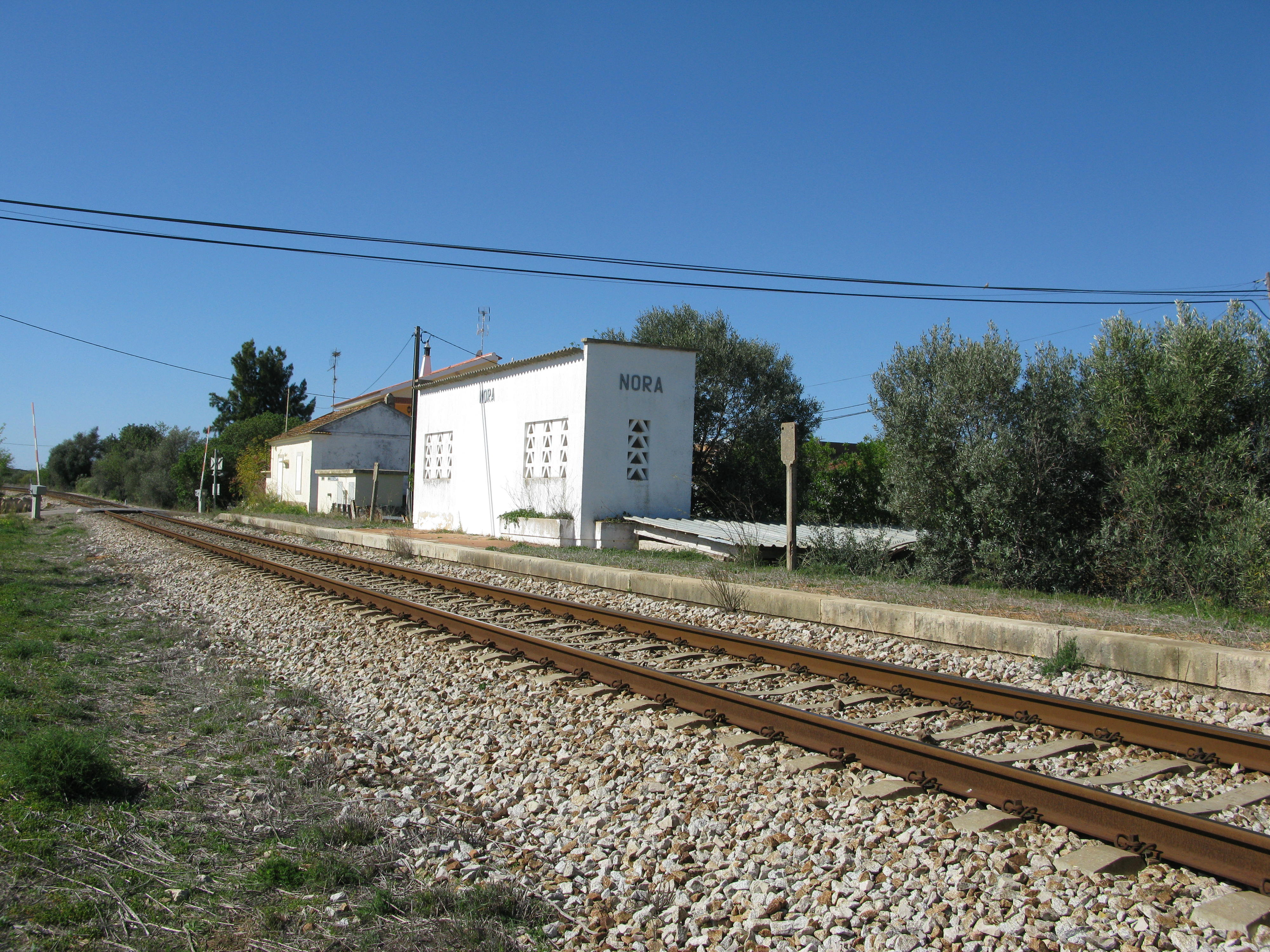
The Nora halt, in February 2018, seen from the east

== History ==
The Nora halt is located on the section of the Algarve line between Tavira and Vila Real de Santo António, which was opened in 14 April 1906, that at the time was considered part of the Sul line. The Nora halt was one of the original stations on the line, with the category of stop. It was later promoted to the category of halt and then closed, after 1985 but before 2010.

== See also ==
- Comboios de Portugal
- Infraestruturas de Portugal
- Rail transport in Portugal
- History of rail transport in Portugal
