= Souto da Velha halt =

Closed halt in northern Portugal

Souto da Velha halt Apeadeiro de Souto da Velha
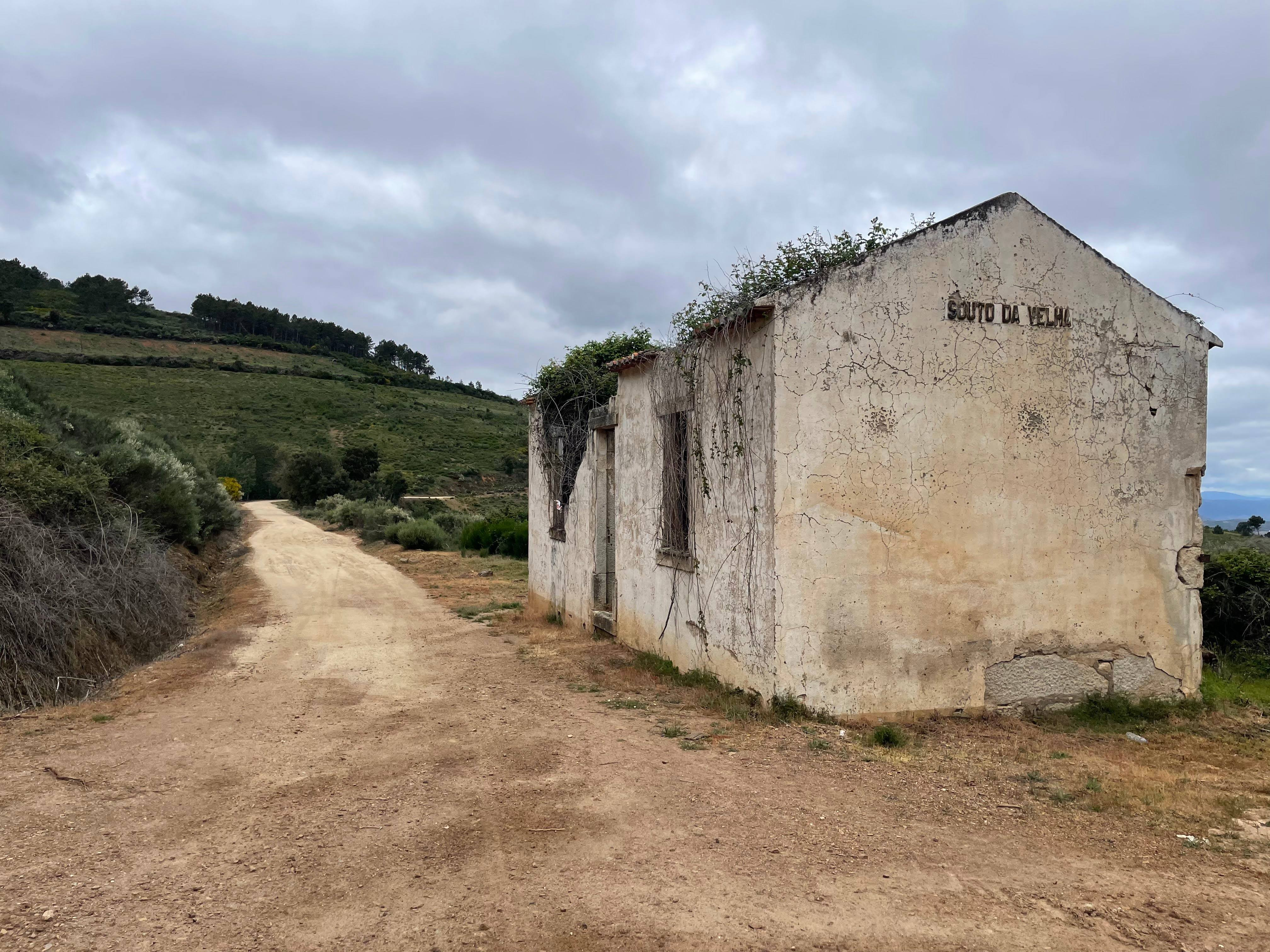
- Souto da Velha halt in 2023

General information
- Location: Souto da Velha, Torre de Moncorvo; Portugal
- Coordinates: 41°11′55.55″N 6°56′30.17″W
- Line: Sabor line (1911-1988)
- Connections: Mós halt; Felgar halt

Other information
- Website: https://www.infraestruturasdeportugal.pt/negocios-e-servicos/horarios

History
- Opened: 17 September 1911
- Closed: 1 August 1988
Location
- Location within Portugal

The Souto da Velha halt was an interface of the Sabor line, which served the town of Souto da Velha, in the municipality of Torre de Moncorvo, in Portugal.

== History ==
This interface was located on the section of the Sabor line between the stations of Pocinho and Carviçais, which entered service on 17 September 1911.

The Souto da Velha halt was closed following the closure of the Sabor line on 1 August 1988.

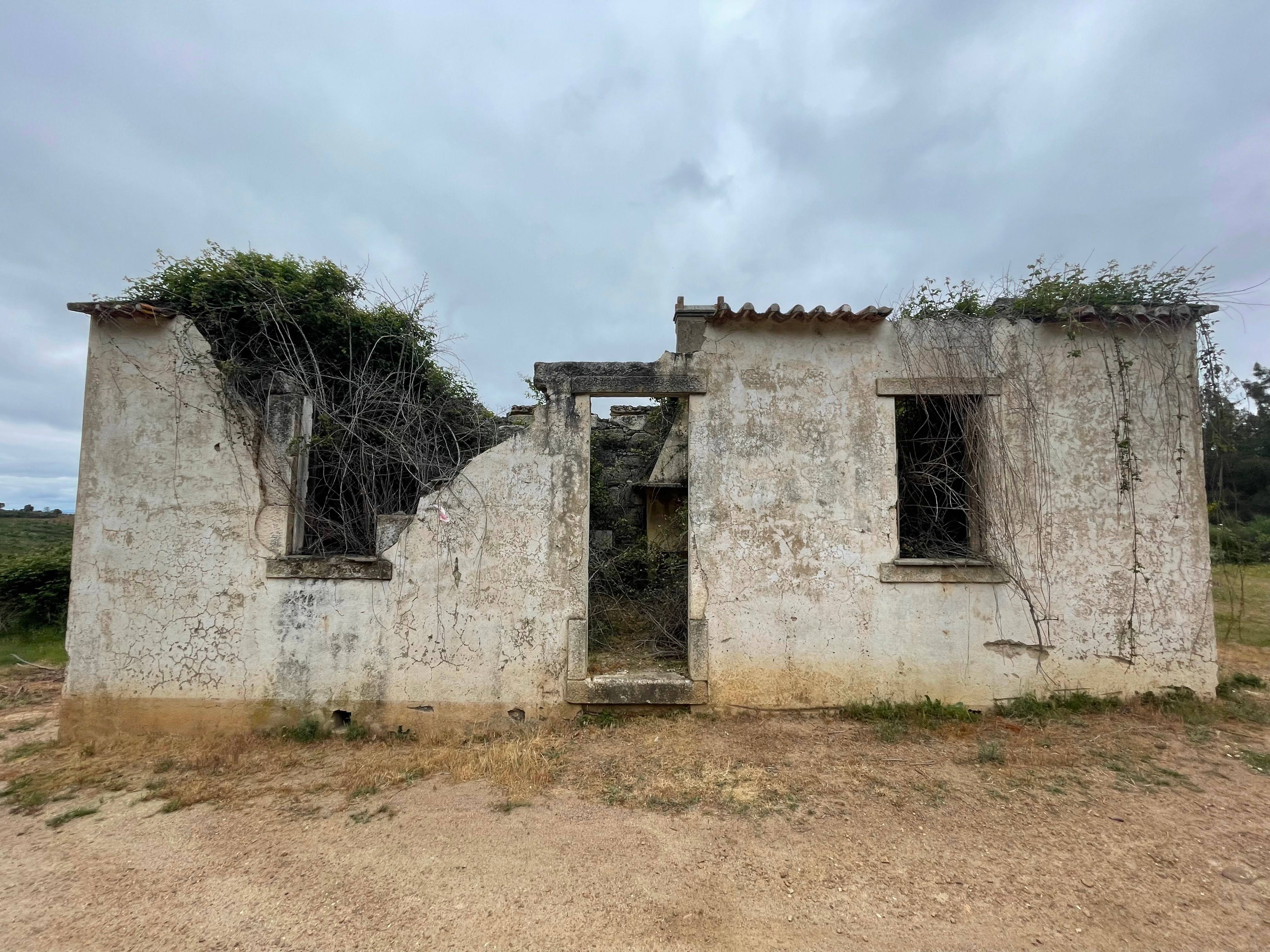
Facade of the Souto da Velha halt, 2023

== See also ==
- Rail transport in Portugal
- History of rail transport in Portugal

== Bibliography ==
- REIS, Francisco; GOMES, Rosa; GOMES, Gilberto; et al. (2006). Os Caminhos de Ferro Portugueses 1856-2006. Lisboa: CP-Comboios de Portugal e Público-Comunicação Social S. A. p. 238. ISBN 989-619-078-X.
