= Figueira halt =

Figueira halt Apeadeiro de Figueira
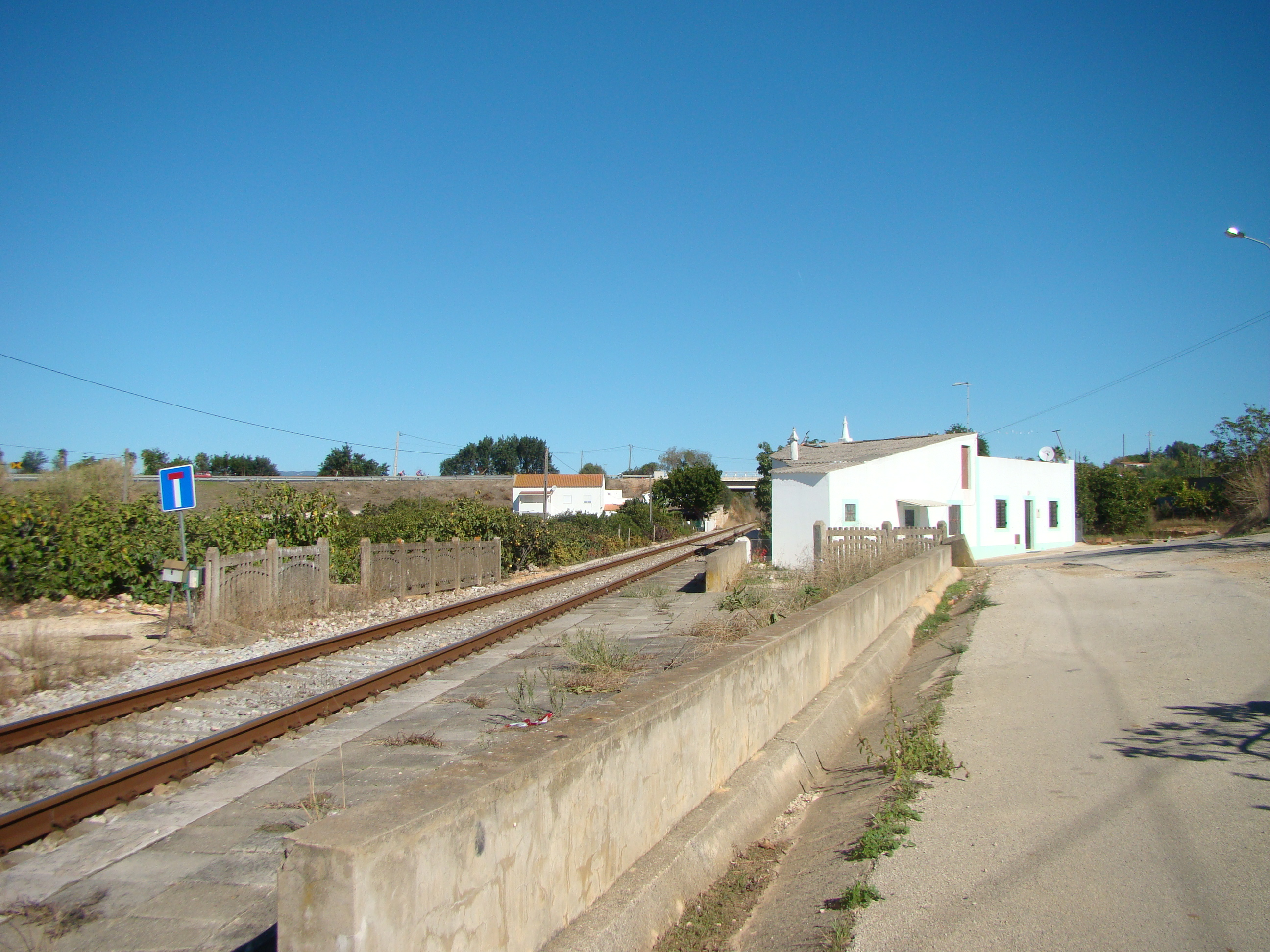
- Figueira halt in 2017

General information
- Location: Portimão; Portugal
- Coordinates: 37°9′39.95″N 8°35′52.45″W
- Owner: Infraestruturas de Portugal
- Line: Linha do Algarve
- Platforms: 1
- Train operators: Comboios de Portugal

History
- Opened: 1 November 1954
Location

Figueira is a closed halt on the Algarve line in the Portimão municipality, Portugal. It was opened on the 1st of November 1954, having been designed for the CP Class 0100 railbuses.
