= Larinho =

Civil parish in northeast Portugal

- Civil parish
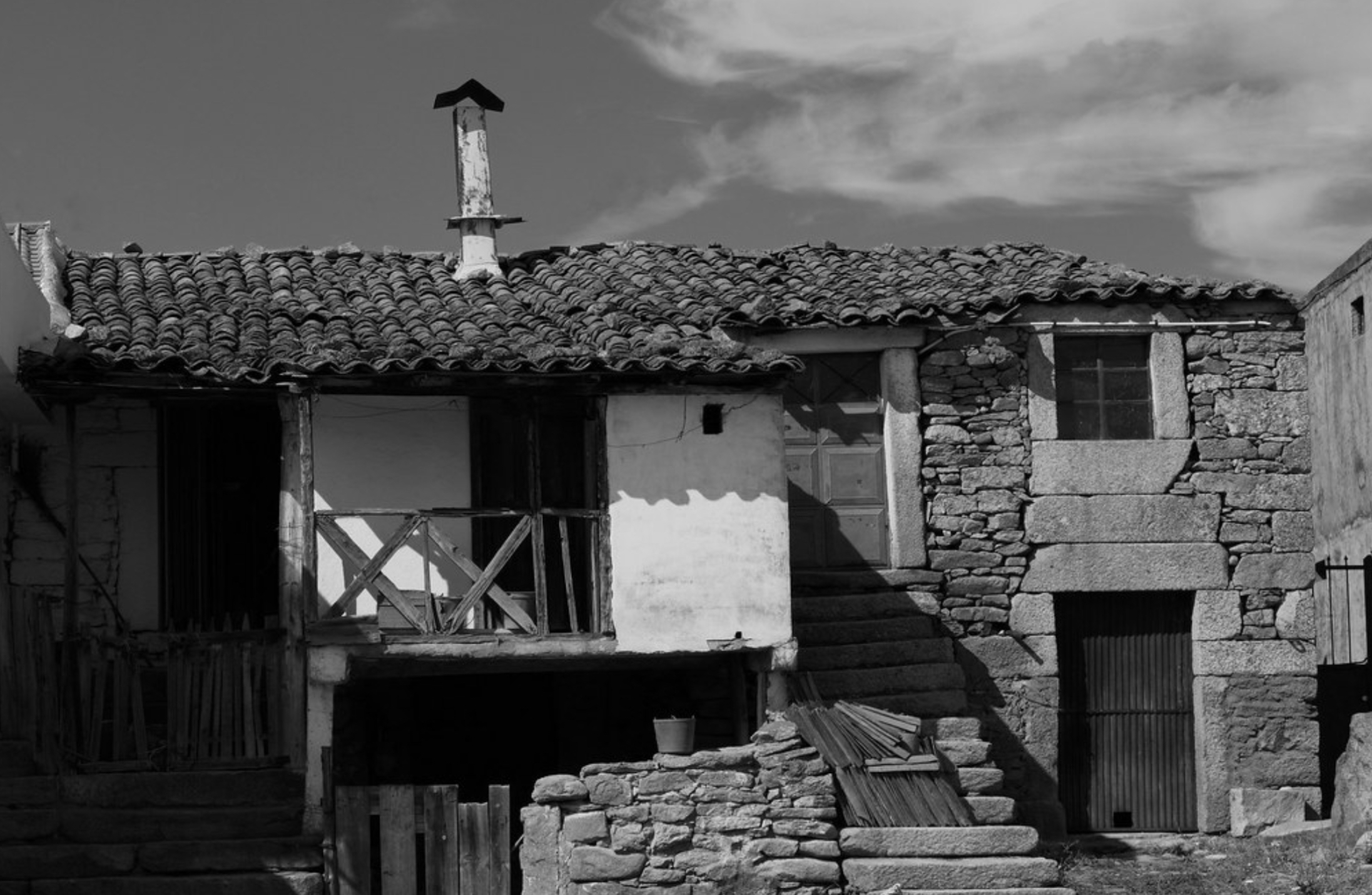
- Old house in Larinho, 2012

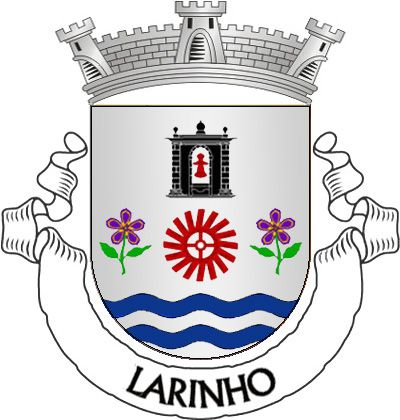
- Coat of arms

- Location in Portugal
- Coordinates: 41°12′24″N 7°0′44″W
- Country: Portugal
- Region: Norte
- Intermunic. comm.: Trás-os-Montes
- District: Bragança
- Municipality: Torre de Moncorvo

Area
  - Total: 29.57 km^{2} (11.42 sq mi)

Population (2021)
  - Total: 327
  - Density: 11.1/km^{2} (28.6/sq mi)
- Time zone: UTC+00:00 (WET)
  - Summer (DST): UTC+01:00 (WEST)
- Area code: 040910
- Website: https://www.cm-moncorvo.pt/pages/996?poi_id=271

Larinho is a Portuguese parish, referred in Portugal as freguesia, in the municipality of Torre de Moncorvo. It has an area of 29.57 km² and a total of 327 inhabitants as of the 2021 census. Its population density is 11.1 inhabitants/km².

It’s located 4 km from Torre de Moncorvo. The people of Larinho are referred to as Larinhatos.

== History ==
Located between the Sabor River and the Serra do Reboredo, Larinho is located in the Sabor valley. With a typically traditional rural center, given its proximity to Torre de Moncorvo, it became a focus of population attraction from the 1890s onwards. It is home to the municipality's industrial complex, as well as the Carmelo de Torre de Moncorvo, a convent of the Carmelite Order, as well as part of the now closed Sabor Line, having its own stop, the Larinho halt.

In addition to the imposing monument that is the Mother Church, dating back to the 18th century, the remains of the old chapel of Santa Luzia, with its 16th century mural painting, the chapels of Santo António (the old parish church), Santa Bárbara, Senhor dos Aflitos (19th century) and Nossa Senhora de Fátima should be highlighted. Of particular interest is the Ferrada fountain, the medieval bridge on the Castelhanos road, the mills of Ribeiro das Lajes and the notable traditional granite buildings that greatly enrich the village.

== Population ==
The population as of the 2021 census:

Population of Larinho
Year	Pop.	±%
1864	655	—
1878	714	+9.0%
1890	735	+2.9%
1900	805	+9.5%
1911	694	−13.8%
1920	726	+4.6%
1930	725	−0.1%
1940	849	+17.1%
1950	837	−1.4%
1960	827	−1.2%
1970	566	−31.6%
1981	658	+16.3%
1991	532	−19.1%
2001	439	−17.5%
2011	365	−16.9%
2021	327	−10.4%

The population of Larinho by age groups
Age	0-14	15-24	25-64	> 65
2001	54	41	213	131
2011	29	27	164	145
2021	21	22	127	157

== See also ==
- Carmelites
- Sabor Line
