= Ramal da Figueira da Foz =

Railway line in Portugal

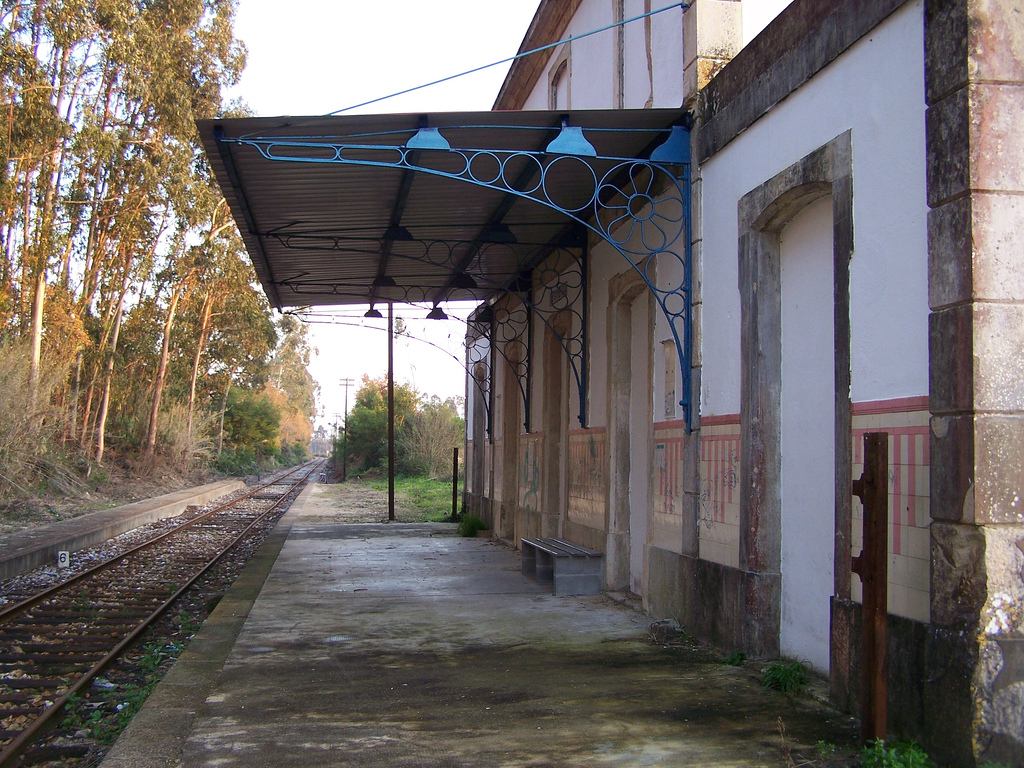
- Ramal da Figueira da Foz in Costeira.

Overview
- Status: Closed
- Termini: Figueira da Foz; Pampilhosa

Technical
- Line length: 50.4 km (31.3 mi)
- Track gauge: Iberian
Route map
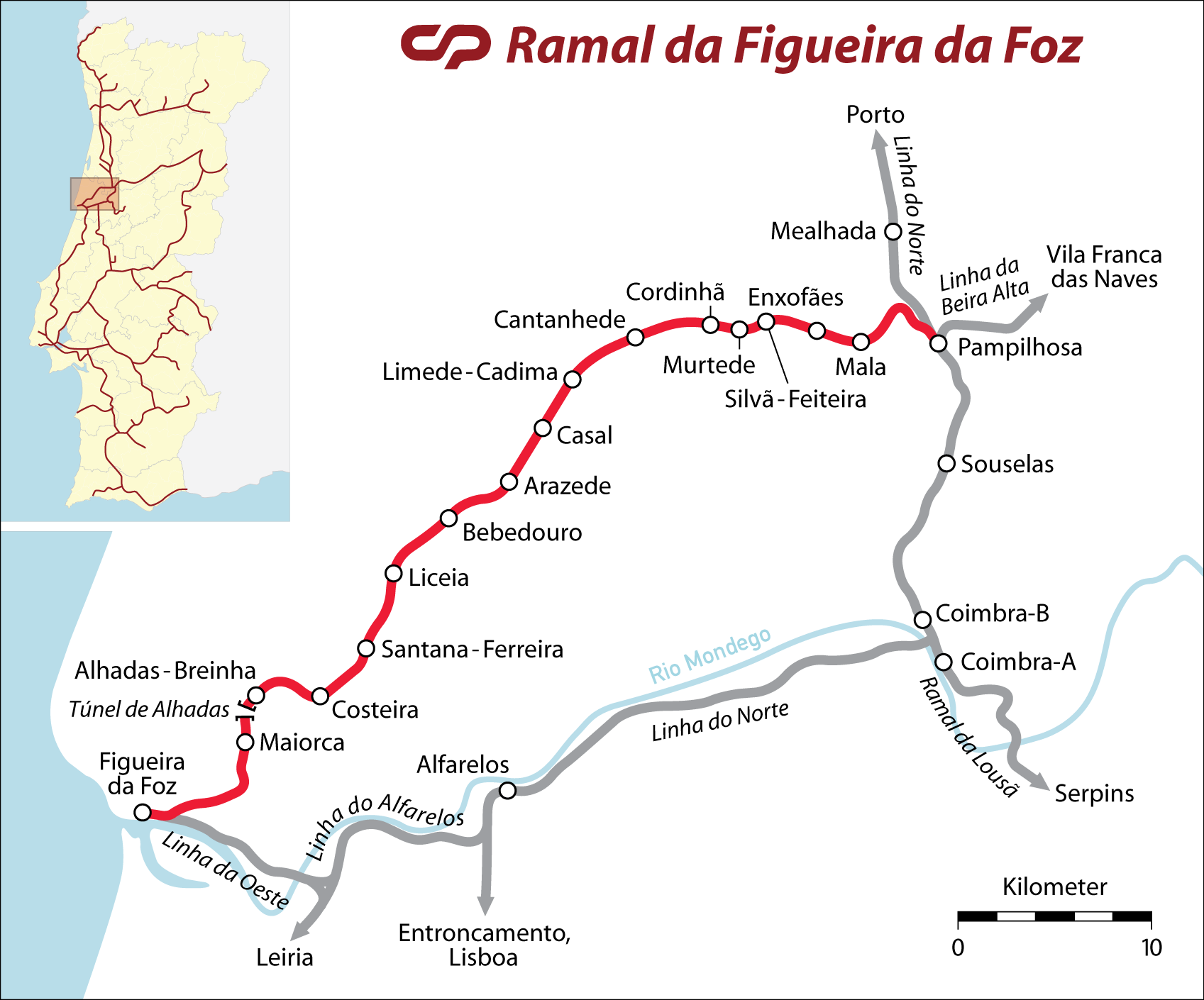

Location on the network
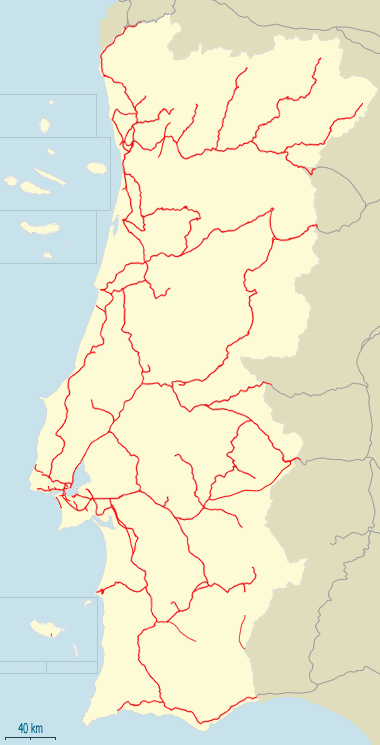

+ Fig. da Foz × Pampilhosa (🔎)

Ramal da Figueira da Foz, also known as Ramal de Pampilhosa, and originally as Linha da Beira Alta, together with the section from Pampilhosa to Vilar Formoso, is a closed railway line in Portugal. It connected the stations of Figueira da Foz (which is also the terminus of the Linha do Oeste) to the station of Pampilhosa, at the junction of Linha do Norte and Linha da Beira Alta, with a total length 50.4 km. It was opened on 3 August 1882, and closed on 5 January 2009, for safety reasons.

== See also ==
- List of railway lines in Portugal
- List of Portuguese locomotives and railcars
- History of rail transport in Portugal

== Sources ==
- Arroteia, Jorge Carvalho (1985). Figueira da Foz. A Cidade e o Mar (in Portuguese). Coimbra: Coimbra:Ministério da Administração Interna - Comissão de Coordenação da Região Centro.
