= Sanhoane (Mogadouro) =

Extinct parish in Mogadouro, Portugal

- Civil parish
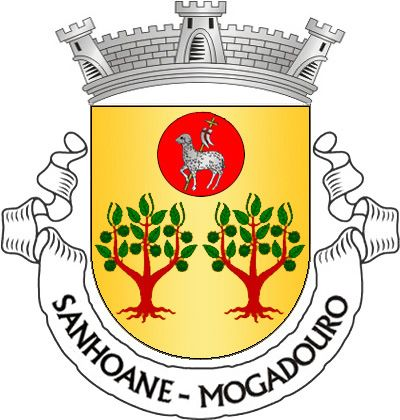
- Coat of arms

- Location in Portugal
- Coordinates: 41°22′46″N 6°33′59″W
- Country: Portugal
- Region: Norte
- Intermunic. comm.: Trás-os-Montes
- District: Bragança
- Municipality: Mogadouro

Area
  - Total: 12.68 km^{2} (4.90 sq mi)

Population (2011)
  - Total: 126
  - Density: 9.9/km^{2} (26/sq mi)
- Time zone: UTC+00:00 (WET)
  - Summer (DST): UTC+01:00 (WEST)

Sanhoane was a parish in the municipality of Mogadouro, Portugal. In the 2012/2013 administrative reorganisation, it became the seat of the Brunhozinho, Castanheira e Sanhoane parish union.

== Geography ==
Sanhoane covered an area of 1268 hectares. Located in the centre of the Mirandese plateau, more specifically on the highest slopes of the mountain massif known as Serra de Mogadouro, it is 15 kilometres from the county seat. The landscape is generally flat, but there is one high point worth mentioning: the Castelico, the highest point in this ancient parish and from where you can see a vast horizon stretching into Spain.

The former parish of Sanhoane bordered Saldanha to the north, Castanheira to the north-west, Travanca to the north-east, Penas Roias to the south-west, Brunhozinho to the south-east and Tó to the south.

The large Fonte da Pedra lagoon is located in a small valley and is crossed by the road that serves this old parish, where fishing is practised and it is an inviting place for recreation and leisure, where you can enjoy a good snack under the leafy trees that surround it.

== History ==
The place's name goes back to the early days of life in Sanhoane, in Castrogelo, a primitive settlement in the area, that still shows great traces of its existence, such as stones from hand mills, ceramic and metal pieces, and funerary stelae of Roman origin.

The curious name of this ancient parish seems to be derived from its patron saint, John the Baptist. In fact, until the 15th century, it was very common to identify it as San Oane, Sago Ane or San One, a name that over the centuries or with the ease of the language came to be called Sanhoane.

Until the 19th century, Sanhoane belonged to the municipality of Penas Roias. In addition to Sanhoane, the villages of Castanheira, São Martinho do Peso, Macedo do Peso, Peso, Vilariça, Variz, Viduedo and Sampaio were also part of the municipality. In 1801 the municipality had 1560 inhabitants

On 22 May 1938, the railway line between Mogadouro, and Duas Igrejas, in the municipality of Miranda do Douro, was opened. On this section, within the Sabor line, there was a stop near the village of Sanhoane (Sanhoane halt). On 1 August 1988, the line was closed and the halt was dismantled.

== Heritage and Tourism ==
=== Points of interest ===
This ancient parish has a small cultural and built heritage, but it is worth visiting:

- The Church of Sanhoane, with just one nave supported by three Romanesque arches and three altars with beautiful images.
- Chapel of Santo Amaro (Sanhoane), a large temple with just one altar and two panels where we are told a legend relating to the miraculous saint and a member of the Távoras, a nobleman from Quinta de Nogueira, near Mogadouro, who tried to kidnap him for the chapel of his quinta, but the miraculous saint caused the horse he was riding to break a leg and its owner turned to the saint and promised him that if the animal got better he would put it back on his altar and have the temple enlarged. And so it happened. This grandiose temple also has a surrounding area surrounded by a granite wall that houses the House of Miracles for the payment of promises made to the miraculous saint.
- A large number of dovecotes, characteristic of this area.
- Preserved diving fountain and tumuli.

=== Handicrafts ===
Weaving, woollen rugs, lace quilts and wicker basketry.

=== Gastronomy ===
Enchidos, presunto, Easter folar, cascas de bulho, mirandese steak.

=== Festivals ===
- Saint Amaro - 15 January (saint's day)
- Saint Amaro - 3rd Sunday in July (traditionally celebrated on the 3rd Sunday in June until 2006)
- Saint Barbara - 1st weekend in September - Saturday
- Saint John - 24 June

== Access ==
Sanhoane had a railway station (Sanhoane halt on the Sabor line (closed). It lies off the IC 5 road between Mogadouro and Sendim.

== Population ==
Totals and age groups
	1864	1878	1890	1900	1911	1920	1930	1940	1950	1960	1970	1981	1991	2001	2011
	277	244	262	275	287	281	266	365	329	346	258	258	179	149	126
i)														12	8
ii)														15	8
iii)														78	58
iv)														44	52

i) 0-14; ii) 15-24; iii) 25-64; iv) 65 and older
