= Alvor halt =

Alvor halt Apeadeiro de Alvor
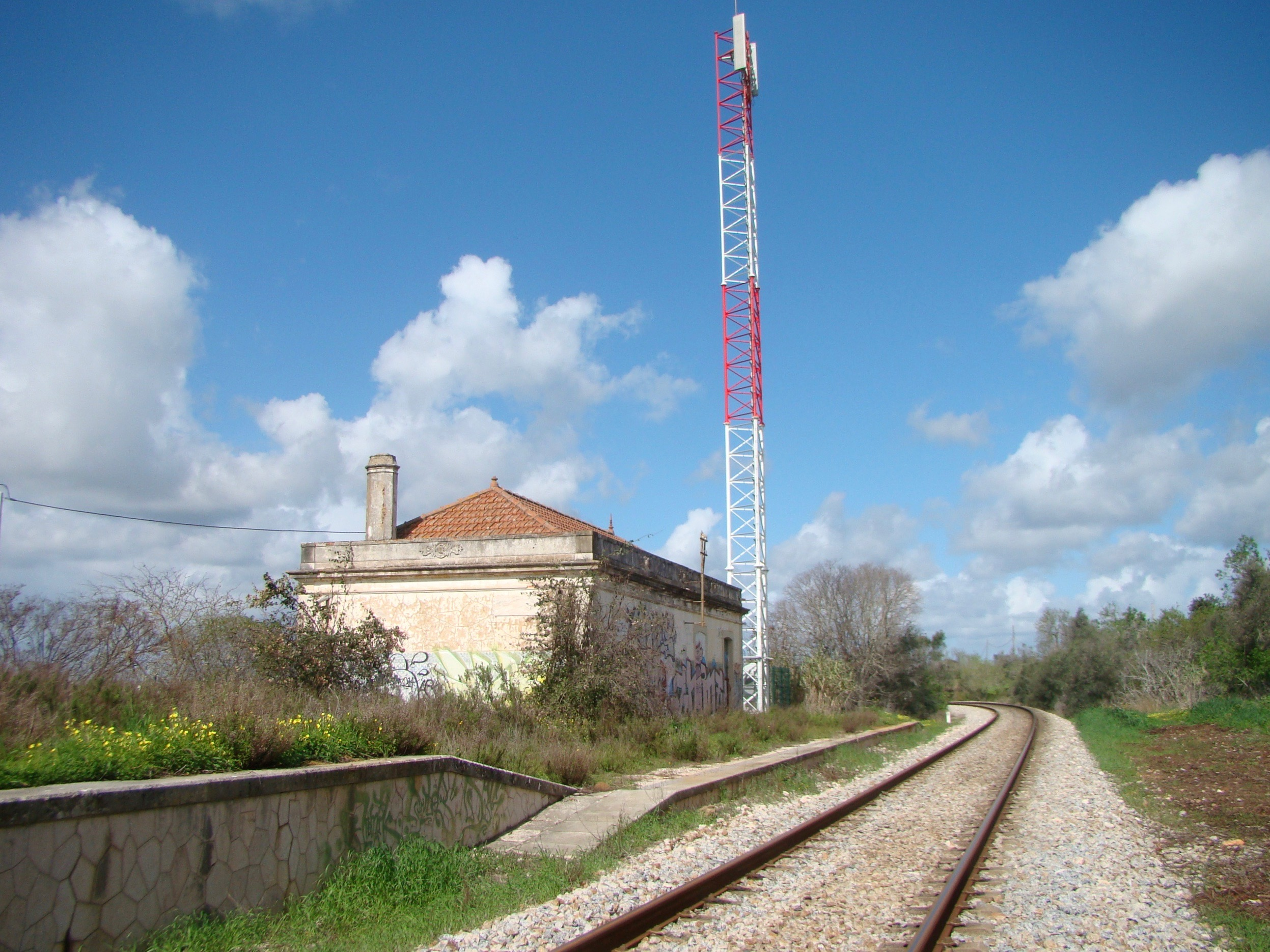
- Alvor halt in 2018

General information
- Location: Portimão; Portugal
- Coordinates: 37°9′33.28″N 8°33′45.48″W
- Owner: Infraestruturas de Portugal
- Line: Linha do Algarve
- Platforms: 1
- Train operators: Comboios de Portugal

History
- Opened: July 30, 1922; 104 years ago
Location

Alvor is a closed halt on the Algarve line in the Portimão municipality, Portugal. The section of the line from Portimão to Lagos opened on the 30th of July 1922.
