= Urrós (Mogadouro) =

Civil parish in northeast Portugal

- Civil parish
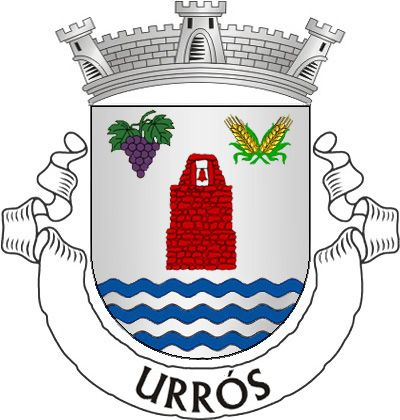
- Coat of arms

- Location in Portugal
- Coordinates: 41°20′37″N 6°28′01″W
- Country: Portugal
- Region: Norte
- Intermunic. comm.: Trás-os-Montes
- District: Bragança
- Municipality: Mogadouro

Area
  - Total: 32.47 km^{2} (12.54 sq mi)

Population (2021)
  - Total: 250
  - Density: 7.7/km^{2} (20/sq mi)
- Time zone: UTC+00:00 (WET)
  - Summer (DST): UTC+01:00 (WEST)
- Area code: 040821
- Website: jf-urros.pt

Urrós (Portuguese pronunciation: [uˈʀɔʃ]) (Mirandese: Ruolos, Mirandese pronunciation: [ˈrwo.lʊs̺]) is a civil parish of the municipality of Mogadouro, with 32,47 km² of area and 250 inhabitants (2021 census).

== Population ==
Population of the parish of Urrós
Year	Pop.	±%
1864	683	—
1878	750	+9.8%
1890	714	−4.8%
1900	810	+13.4%
1911	841	+3.8%
1920	786	−6.5%
1930	840	+6.9%
1940	880	+4.8%
1950	899	+2.2%
1960	901	+0.2%
1970	589	−34.6%
1981	661	+12.2%
1991	475	−28.1%
2001	425	−10.5%
2011	318	−25.2%
2021	250	−21.4%

== Topography ==
Located on the right bank of the Douro River, as it enters Portugal surrounded by small valleys, the parish of Urrós is twenty kilometers from the town of Mogadouro. Its frontier character, together with its rugged geography, has marked its character and evolution throughout history.

Ribeirinhos do Douro is located to the east, Algoso and Matela to the north, Travanca to the west, and Brunhozinho and Bemposta to the south.

Some authors say that its name has a topographical origin, while others suggest that it was owned by the Muslim Oborrós in 1019. Contradicted by the fact that the name of the village in Mirandese is Ruolos. The name of Urros appears differently in various documents: Urros (840), Duros, Durros, Huros, Orrio (in the Foral of 1182). In the 14th and 15th centuries it appears as Orge, Ordo, Orgho and Orio, possibly derived from barley. Other authors say that its name derives from the fact that the parish sits on a small plateau, between two streams, with small, sloping valleys.

== Access ==
Urrós used to have the Urrós halt, an interface in the Sabor line, however it was closed and abandoned when the line was shut down on 1 August 1988.
