= Urrós halt =

Closed halt in northeast Portugal

Urrós halt Apeadeiro de Urrós
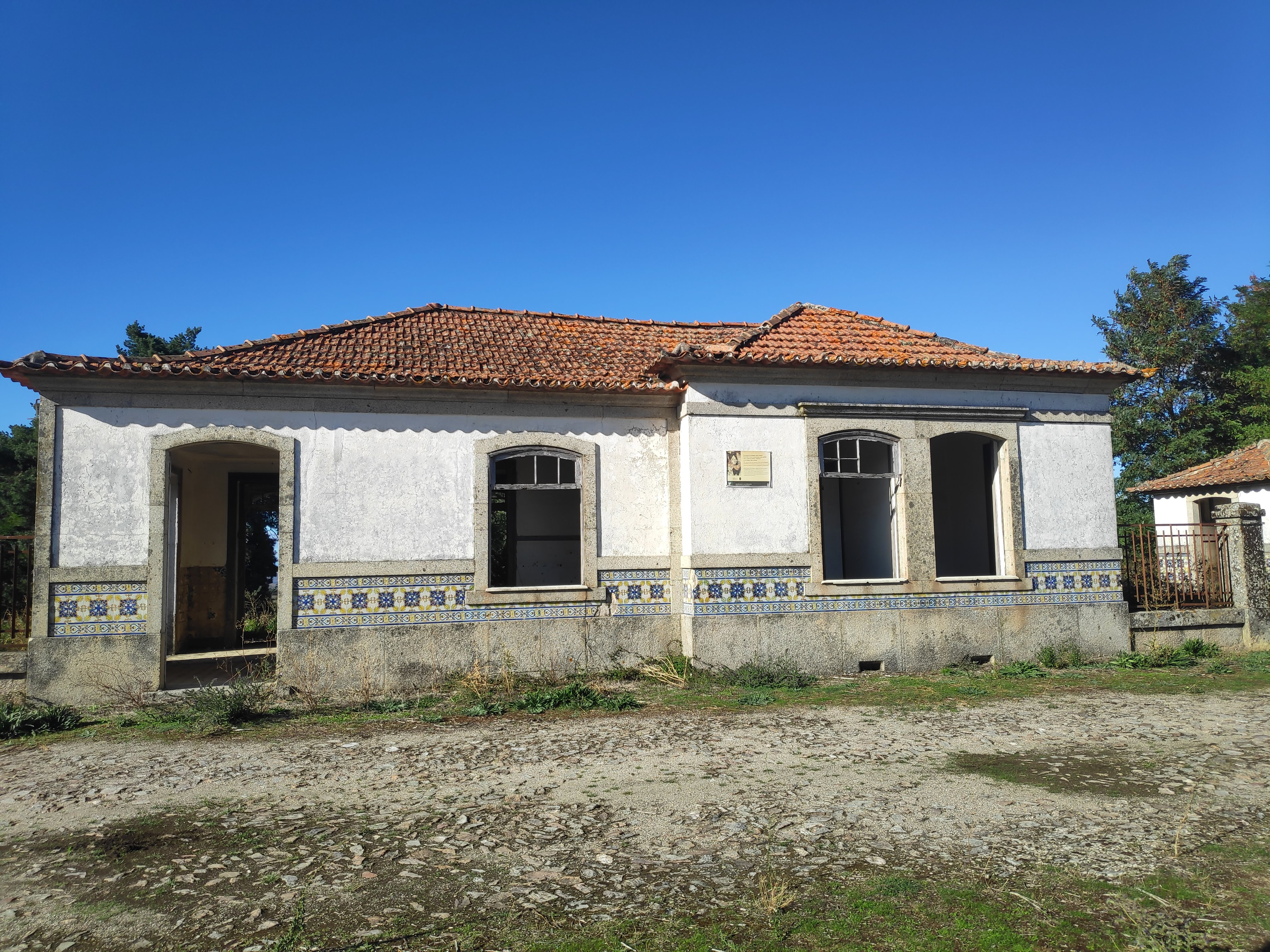
- Urrós halt, 2021

General information
- Location: Urrós, Mogadouro; Portugal
- Coordinates: 41°22′02.93″N 6°29′44.69″W
- Line: Sabor line (1938-1988)
- Distance: Pocinho - 88.3km; Mogadouro - 15.8km; Duas Igrejas - Miranda - 17km
- Platforms: 1
- Tracks: 2
- Connections: Sendim; Sanhoane

Other information
- Website: http://www.monumentos.gov.pt/Site/APP_PagesUser/SIPA.aspx?id=35689

History
- Opened: 22 May 1938
- Closed: 1 August 1988
Location
- Location within Portugal

The Urrós halt was a station on the Sabor line that served the town of Urrós, in the municipality of Mogadouro, Portugal.

== Description ==
The complex consists of a passenger building (EP), a covered pier (CC), a sanitary facilities building (WC), staff accommodation buildings and a water tank. The passenger building has a polygonal floor plan and single-story façades, plastered and painted white, covered in stonework and ashlars of polychrome tiles. The main façade faces south and there are two panels of toponymic azulejos on the sides. The interior is divided into two zones with similar areas, the one to the east corresponding to the stationmaster's quarters, and the one to the west corresponding to the public area, with a waiting room and porch facing the line, and the service area, with telegraph office, ticket office and dispatch. The walls are covered in tiles with a polychrome pattern.

== History ==
=== Construction and inauguration ===
In 1932, the section of the Sabor line between Mogadouro and Urrós was under construction. In 1937, this section was still under construction, along with the continuation to Duas Igrejas - Miranda.

In Series II of Diário do Governo no. 33, of 10 February 1938, a decree was published ratifying the final acceptance certificate for contract no. 2 of the Sabor line. This included the installation of the railway and the telephone line to Urrós, and the construction of this apeadeiro, which consisted of a passenger building, a toilet, a platform, a goods pier and the corresponding top track, fencing, a locomotive reversing apron, a water tank and a second line.

The Urrós halt was inaugurated on 22 May 1938.

=== Closure ===
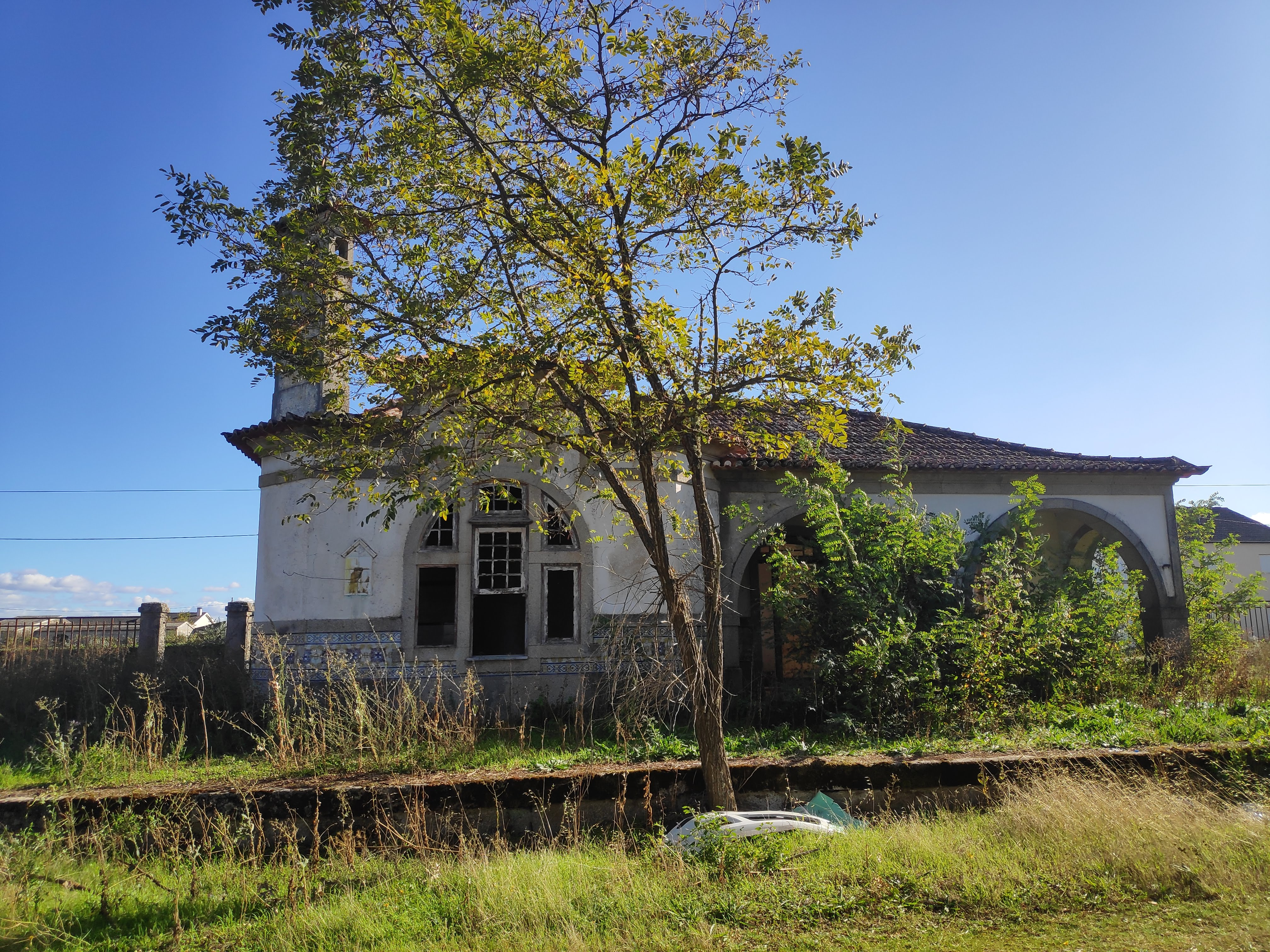
View from the tracks, 2021

Both the Sabor line and the Urrós halt were closed on 1 August 1988.

== See also ==
- Infraestruturas de Portugal
- Comboios de Portugal
- Rail transport in Portugal
- History of rail transport in Portugal

== Bibliography ==
- REIS, Francisco; GOMES, Rosa; GOMES, Gilberto; et al. (2006). Os Caminhos de Ferro Portugueses 1856-2006. CP-Comboios de Portugal e Público-Comunicação Social S. A. p. 238. ISBN 989-619-078-X.
