= Odiáxere halt =

Odiáxere halt Apeadeiro de Odiáxere
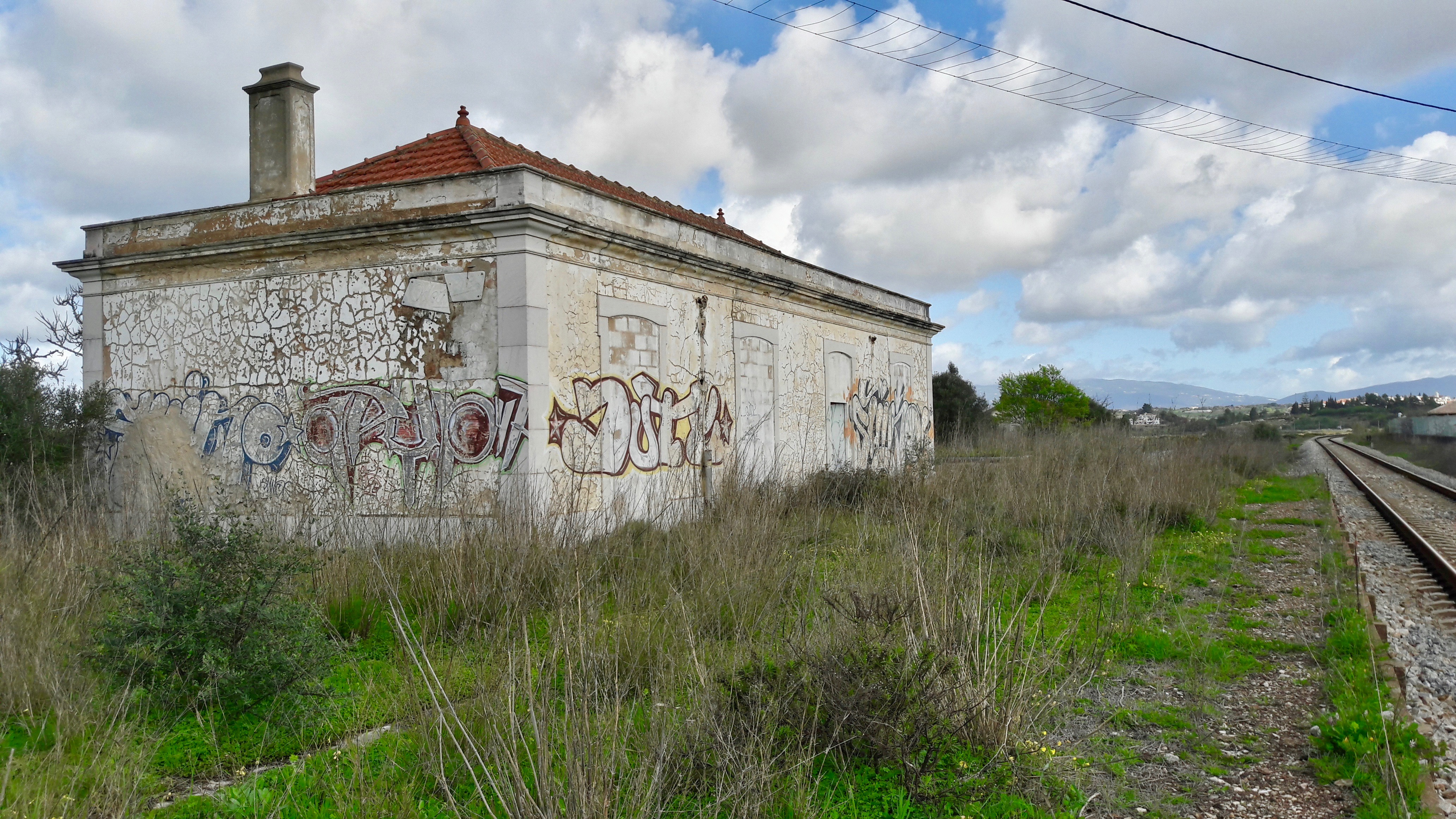
- Odiáxere halt in 2018

General information
- Location: Lagos; Portugal
- Coordinates: 37°8′21.01″N 8°37′32.23″W
- Owner: Infraestruturas de Portugal
- Line: Linha do Algarve
- Platforms: 1
- Train operators: Comboios de Portugal

History
- Opened: 30 July 1922
- Closed: 2003
Location

Odiáxere is a closed halt on the Algarve line in the Lagos municipality, Portugal. It was opened on the 30th of July 1922, and closed in 2003. At the time, the halt had an average of 20 passengers per month.
