= Duas Igrejas - Miranda railway station =

Closed railway station in Portugal

Duas Igrejas - Miranda Station Estação Ferroviária de Duas Igrejas - Miranda
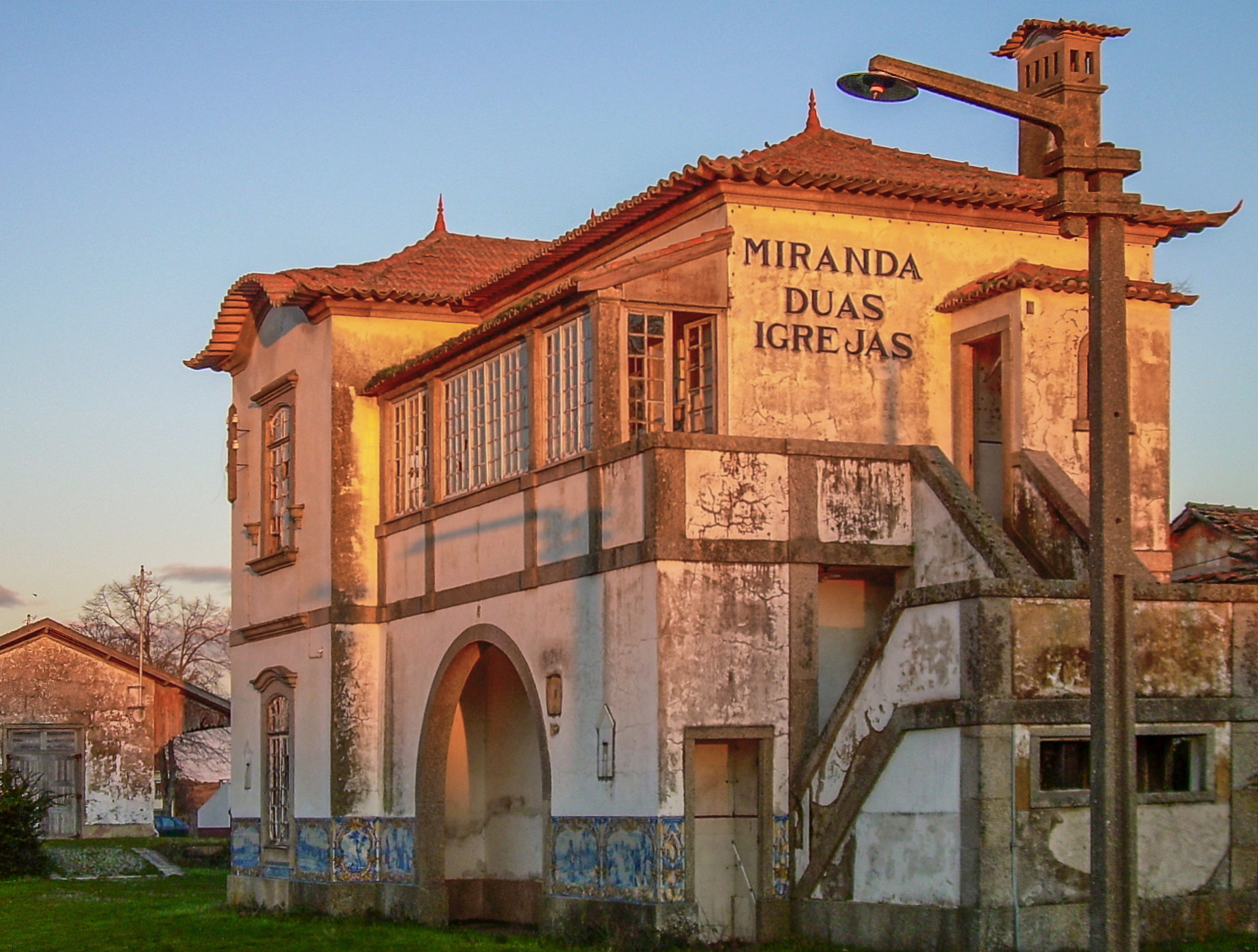
- Main building of the Duas Igrejas - Miranda station, in 2006

General information
- Location: Miranda do Douro; Portugal
- Coordinates: 41°28′23.85″N 6°21′54.71″W
- Elevation: 748 m (2,454 ft)
- Line: Sabor line (1938-1988)
- Connections: Fonte de Aldeia

Other information
- Website: http://www.monumentos.gov.pt/Site/APP_PagesUser/SIPA.aspx?id=26755

History
- Opened: 22 May 1938
- Closed: 1 August 1988
Location
- Location within Portugal

The Duas Igrejas - Miranda railway station was the terminus of the Sabor line, which served the town of Miranda do Douro, in the Bragança District of Portugal.

== Description ==
The old station is located about 10 km from Miranda do Douro. The building was constructed in the traditional Portuguese style.

The station is decorated with azulejos produced at the Sant'Anna factory in Lisbon, illustrating period scenes from daily life in Trás-os-Montes.

== History ==
=== Planning, construction and inauguration ===
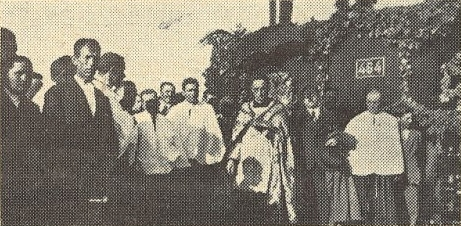
A priest blessing the first train that crossed the Mogadouro - Duas Igrejas section of the Sabor Line, 22 May 1938.

In 1899, the technical commission that was tasked with studying the plan for complementary lines north of the Mondego proposed a broad gauge line from Pocinho to Miranda do Douro, which served the iron mines of Reboredo and the marble and alabaster quarries of Santo Adrião in Vimioso, then on to the border for a later connection via Zamora and Valladolid. This line was partially classified as metric track by the railway plan, decreed on 15 February 1900, and its construction was approved in 1905.

At the meeting of the Council of Ministers on 10 January, 1934, the draft contract for contract no. 3 of the Sabor line was approved, corresponding to the section between Urrós and Duas Igrejas, and this station was to have road access and a telephone connection.

The section between Mogadouro and Duas Igrejas - Miranda was opened for operation on 22 May 1938, by the Portuguese National Railway Company. A special train was organized for the ceremony.

A decree published in Diário do Governo n. 159, Series 2, of 12 July 1938 authorized the expropriation of land for the installation of an access road to the Duas Igrejas station.

=== Projected continuation ===
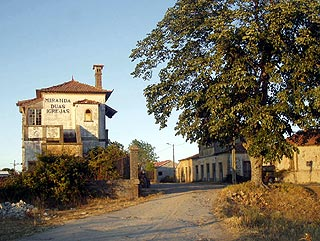
Duas Igrejas - Miranda station, August 2005

In the General Plan of the Railway Network, published by Decree No. 18:190 of 28 March 1930, the intention to continue the Sabor Line beyond Duas Igrejas to Vimioso, to serve the quarries, was resumed.

Two routes were planned for this section, one through the Vale de São Pedro da Silva, and the other passing near Miranda do Douro, Malhadas and Caçarelhos.

=== Closure ===
The Sabor line was closed on 1 August 1988, leading to the abandonment of the Duas Igrejas - Miranda station.

== See also ==
- Infraestruturas de Portugal
- Comboios de Portugal
- Rail transport in Portugal
- History of rail transport in Portugal
