= Mogadouro railway station =

Railway station in Mogadouro, Portugal

Mogadouro Station Estação Ferroviária do Mogadouro
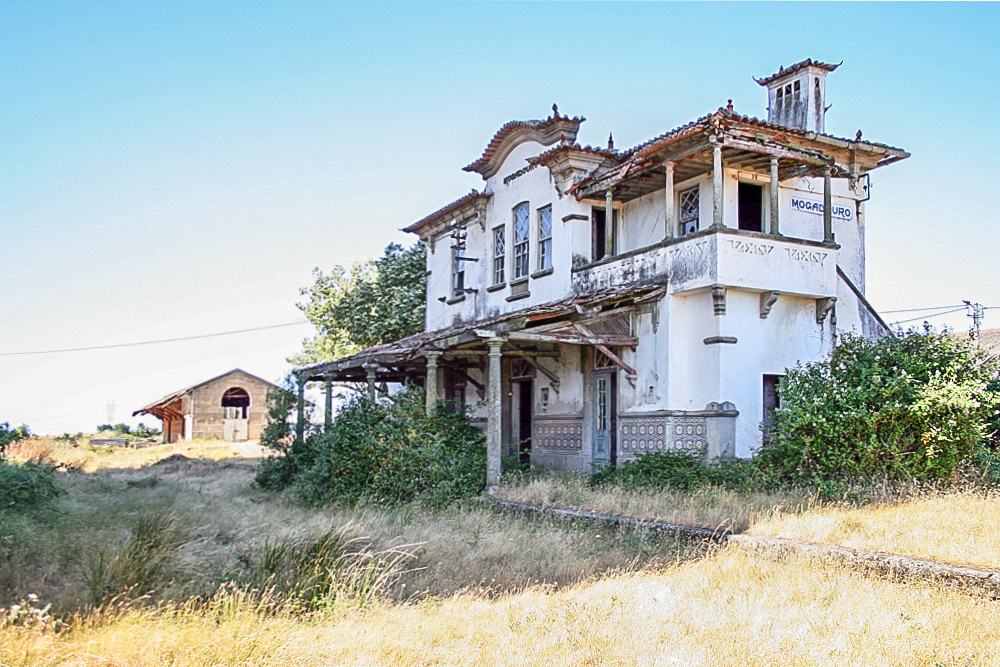
- Mogadouro station in 2008

General information
- Location: Mogadouro; Portugal
- Coordinates: 41°20′03.11″N 6°39′02.63″W
- Elevation: 770 m (2,530 ft)
- Line: Sabor line (1930-1988)
- Distance: Pocinho - 72.6km; Duas Igrejas - Miranda - 32.7km
- Connections: Variz; Vilar de Rei

Other information
- Website: http://www.monumentos.gov.pt/Site/APP_PagesUser/SIPA.aspx?id=35691

History
- Opened: 1 June 1930
- Closed: 1 August 1988
Location
- Location within Portugal

The Mogadouro railway station, part of the now closed Sabor Line, was a rail interface that served the town of Mogadouro, Bragança District, Portugal.

== Description ==
The Mogadouro station was 5.8 km from the town of the same name, via the EN221. It consists of a passenger building (located on the northwest side of the track), a covered pier, an electrical building, a water tank, a workshop and staff quarters.

=== Exterior ===
The passenger building has a polygonal floor plan and two-storey façades, plastered and painted white, bordered by an ashlar pediment and, on the façade facing the line, an ashlar of polychrome azulejos, and topped by a double frieze and cornice of ashlar, the lower one incorporating a frieze of polychrome patterned azulejos.

There are toponymic azulejo panels on the lateral façades. The main façade faces west. On the rear façade, the central panel has a porch with carved granite columns.

=== Interior ===
Inside, the first floor was used for the service area, with a telegraph office, dispatches and the ticket office, with a small wooden window with an arched opening, preserving a metal guard that limited passenger access to it, and the wooden structure of another ticket office, as well as the public area with a waiting room.

The second floor, accessed by external side staircases on the north façade, was used to house the stationmaster and his family, keeping the areas well defined. The walls are covered in tiles in a geometric, polychrome pattern.

== History ==
=== Construction and inauguration ===
In July 1926, it was announced that work would resume on the stretch of the Sabor Line between Carviçais and Mogadouro, after a long period of suspension.

On 1 June 1930, the section between Lagoaça and Mogadouro was put into service by the Companhia Nacional de Caminhos de Ferro. However, the track laying and building works were only completed in 1932; even so, the General Directorate of Railways, which inspected the project in February of that year, ordered the installation of some more infrastructure, including a house for manual workers and an uncovered pier at Mogadouro station. Due to delays in approval, these works only began in August and were almost finished by the beginning of the following year.

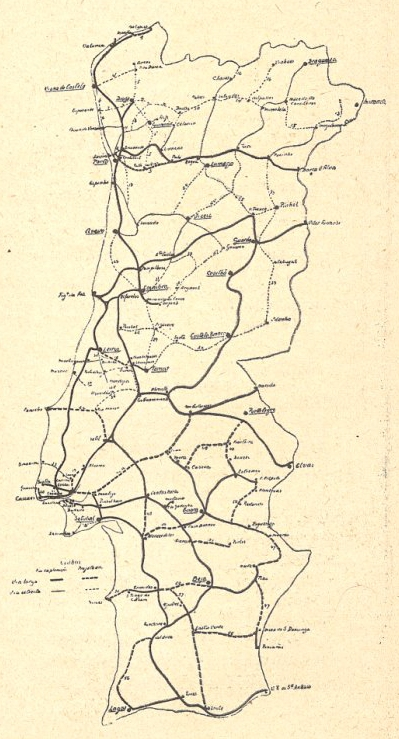
Portuguese railway lines in 1930: One of the projects depicted is the Transversal of Chacim, that goes from the Macedo station (⯈) to the Mogadouro station (⯇).

In 1933, a three-storey house was built at the station for the staff. That year, a decree was also submitted to the Minister of Public Works and Communications for approval regarding the expropriation of a plot of land next to the station for the installation of a sleepers creosoting workshop. This building was constructed the following year, in 1934.

=== Continuation to Duas Igrejas - Miranda ===
The next section of the Sabor Line, to Duas Igrejas - Miranda, was inaugurated on 22 May 1938.

=== Transversal of Chacim ===
Decree 18:190 of 28 March 1930 introduced the General Plan for the Railway Network, the aim of which was to regulate railway line projects in Portugal. One of the planned connections was the Transversal of Chacim, from Macedo de Cavaleiros, on the Tua line, to Mogadouro.

This section, which would be around 50 kilometres long, would form part of the Transversal of Trás-os-Montes, which would connect the narrow gauge lines north of the Douro River: Sabor, Tua, Corgo, Tâmega and Guimarães. The Transversal of Chacim was never built.

=== Closure ===
The Sabor line was closed on 1 August 1988, leading to the abandonment of the Mogadouro station.

Plans to reopen the line were made throughout the years but none has yet been implemented.

== Gallery ==
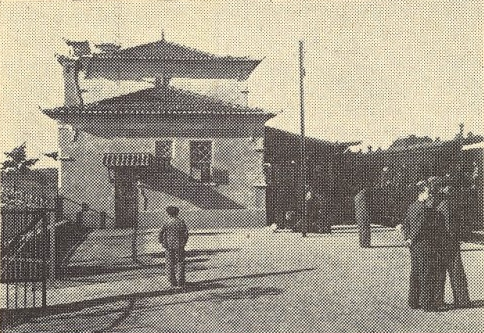
Photo of the Mogadouro station in 1938 at the inauguration of the rail section between it and Duas Igrejas - Miranda.

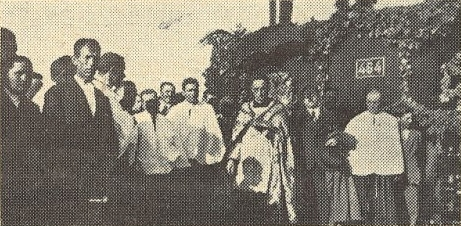
A priest blessing the first train that crossed the Mogadouro - Duas Igrejas section of the Sabor Line, 22 May 1938.

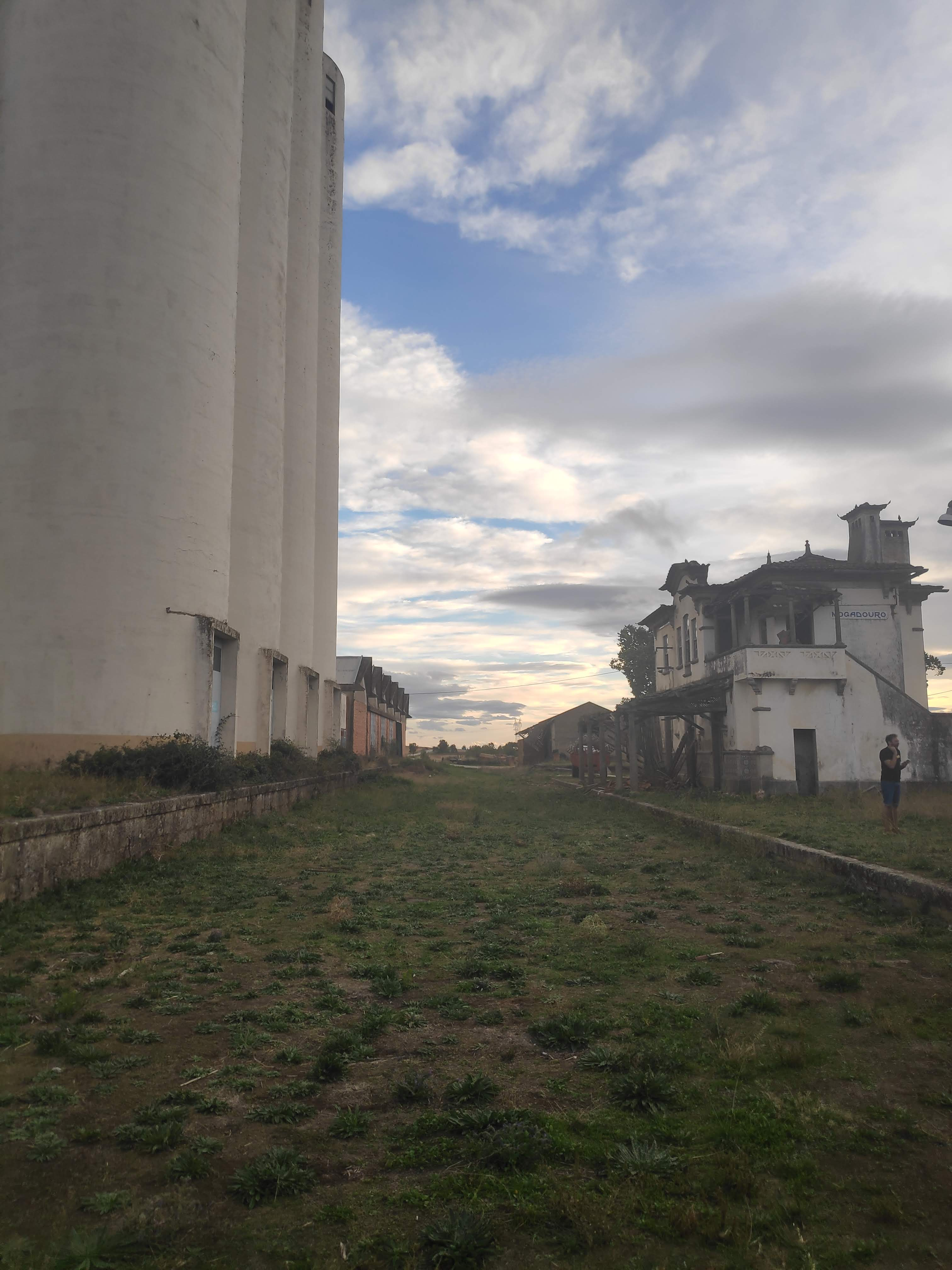
The surroundings of the Mogadouro railway station, 2 October 2021.

== See also ==
- Sabor line
- Transversal of Chacim
- Rail transport in Portugal
- History of rail transport in Portugal

== Bibliography ==
- Reis, Francisco; Gomes, Rosa; Gomes, Gilberto; et al. (2006). Os Caminhos de Ferro Portugueses 1856-2006. Lisbon: CP-Comboios de Portugal e Público-Comunicação Social S. A. p. 238. ISBN 989-619-078-X.
