= Rail transport in Portugal =

Portugal
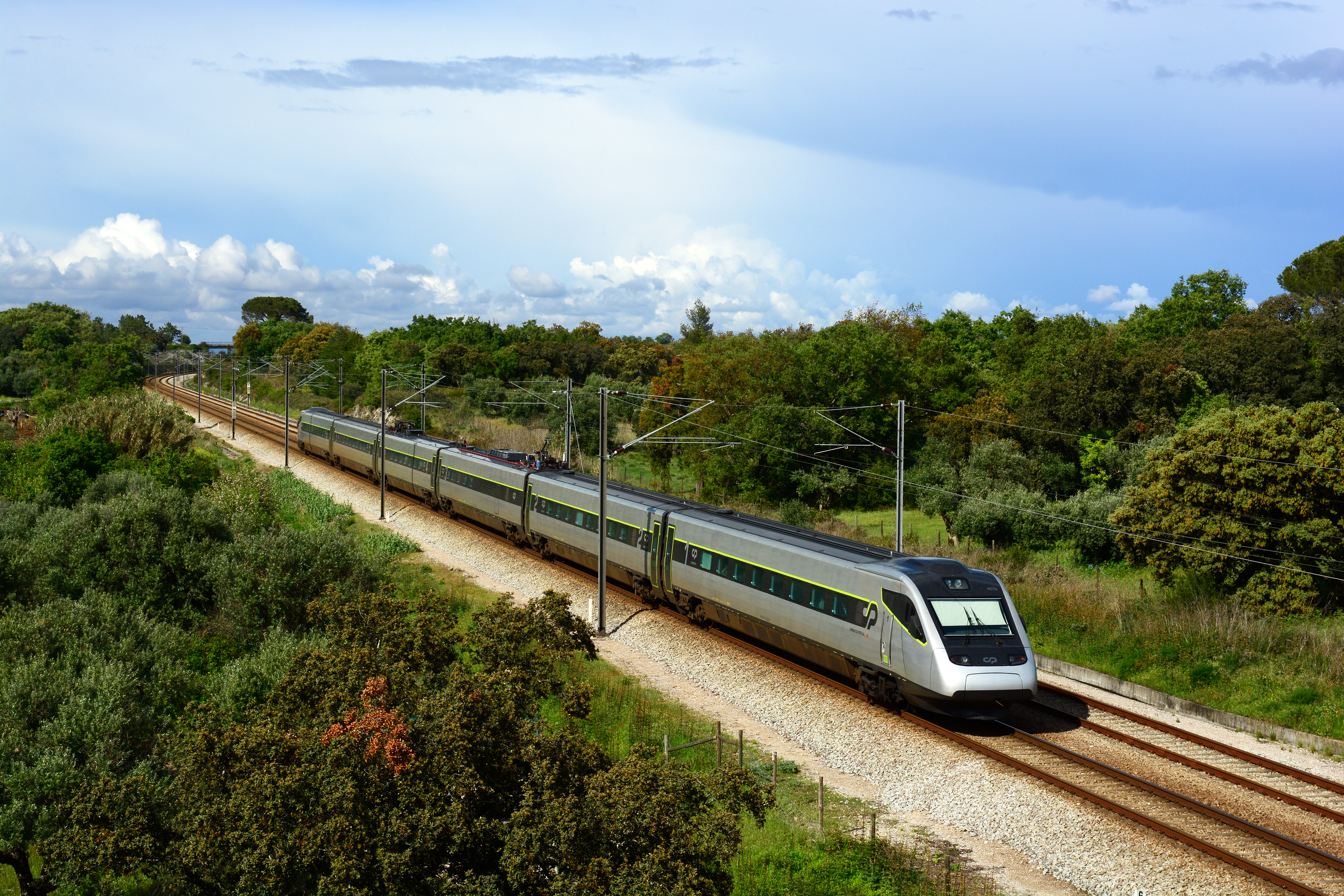
- Alfa Pendular train, on the Northern Line

Operation
- National railway: CP
- Infrastructure company: Infraestruturas de Portugal
- Major operators: CP, Fertagus, Medway - Transportes e Logística, Takargo Rail

Statistics
- Ridership: 175.5 million (2019)
- Passenger-distance: 4.1 billion (2018)

System length
- Total: 2,786 km (1,731 mi)
- High-speed: 593 km (368 mi); 21.2% of the network

Track gauge
- 1,668 mm (5 ft 5 21/32 in) Iberian gauge: 2,603 km (1,617 mi)
- 1,000 mm (3 ft 3 3/8 in) metre gauge: 183 km (114 mi)

Electrification
- 25 kV AC: Main network
- 1500 V DC: Linha de Cascais 25 km (16 mi)

Features
Map

Rail transport in Portugal is provided mainly by Comboios de Portugal (CP), Portugal's national carrier, but also other operators. It includes high speed trains and rapid transit networks in Lisbon and Porto.

Portugal is a member of the International Union of Railways (UIC). The UIC Country Code for Portugal is 94.

There are rail links with Spain, which uses the same Iberian broad gauge. Some lines are in meter gauge.

== Operators ==
Several railway companies operate in Portugal:

- Comboios de Portugal
- Fertagus
- Lisbon Metro
- Porto Metro
- Metro Transportes do Sul (light rail)

== Network ==
Infraestruturas de Portugal is the rail network administrating company, taking over control from REFER on 1 June 2015.

The length of Portugal's railway system is as follows:

- Total: 2,786 km (1,731 mi)
  - 1,668 mm (5 ft 5 21/32 in) Iberian gauge: 2,603 km (1,617 mi), of which 1,351 km or 839 mi are electrified
  - 1,000 mm (3 ft 3 3/8 in) metre gauge: 183 km (114 mi) (as of 2006)

== See also ==
- History of rail transport in Portugal
- List of Portuguese locomotives and railcars
- Narrow gauge railways in Portugal
