= Castle of Mogadouro =

Castle in Bragança District, Portugal

- Castelo de Mogadouro
- Setúbal, Península de Setúbal, Lisboa in Portugal
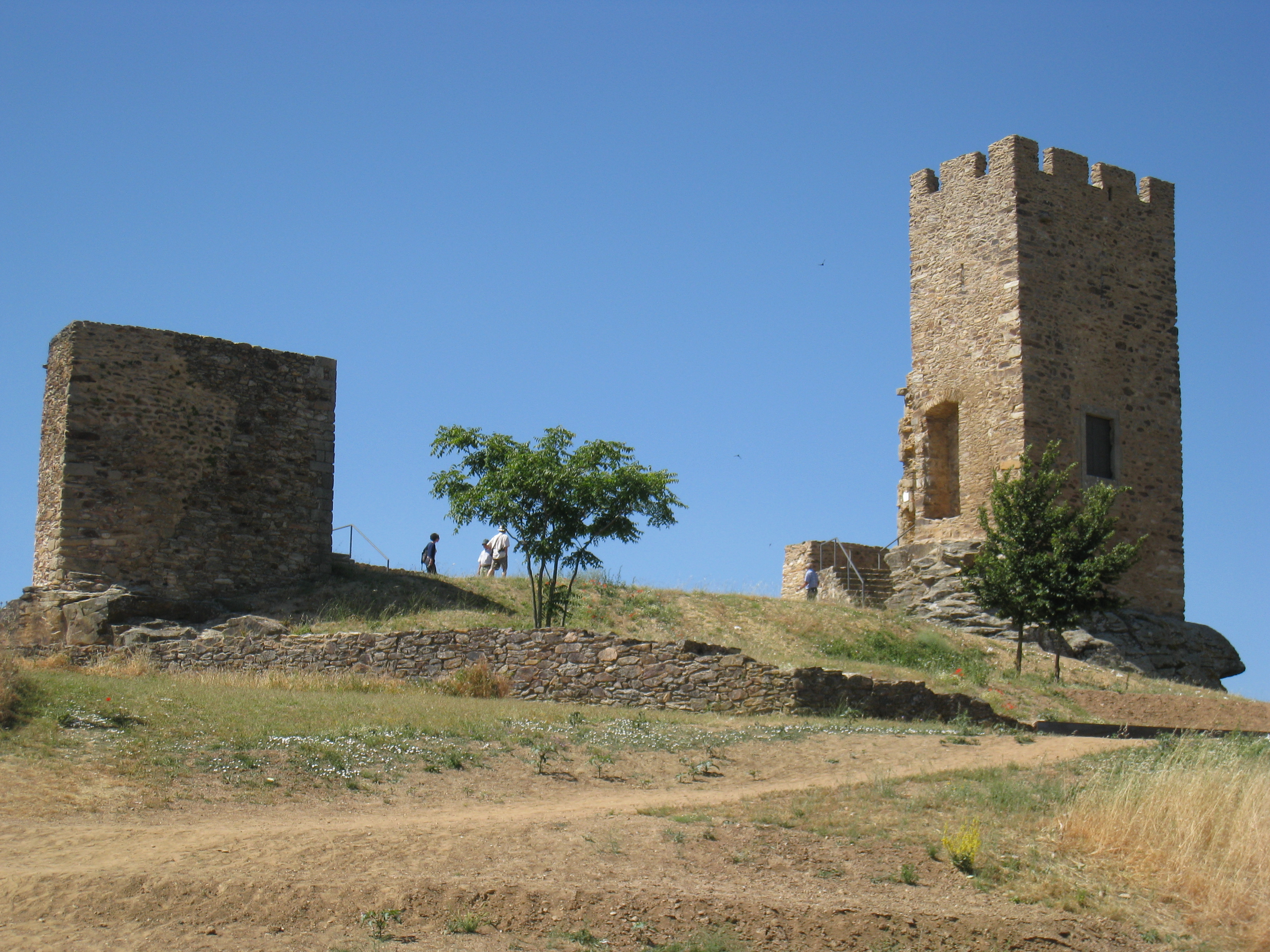

Site information
- Type: Castle
- Owner: Portuguese Republic
- Operator: DRCNorte, Dispatch 829/2009, Diário da República, Série 2, 163 (24 August 2009)
- Open to the public: Private

Location
- Coordinates: 41°20′17.9″N 6°43′12.9″W

Site history
- Built: 12th century
- Materials: Taipa, Masonry, Stone, Reinforced concrete

The Castle of Mogadouro (Portuguese: Castelo de Mogadouro) is a medieval castle located in the civil parish of Mogadouro, Valverde, Vale de Porco e Vilar de Rei, in the municipality of Mogadouro, Portuguese district of Bragança.

== History ==
The castle was constructed between 1160 and 1165, in an area then occupied by a small residential nucleus.

Mogadouro was referred in documents associated with its donation by the Braganção (resident from Bragança) Fernão Mendes to the Knights Templars in 1186. During this period of the Iberian Peninsula Reconquista, the region of Miranda was the scene of numerous battles, that involved settlements in Mogadouro, Algoso, Miranda do Douro, Outeiro de Miranda and Vimioso (which marked the Christian defensive line in northeastern Portugal).

In 1197, the region was traded by King D. Sancho I (along with Penas Róias) for Idanha: the monarch became the principal patron of the region's churches by 1199. Yet, the region transferred back to the Knights Templar in 1223, although patronage of the ecclesiastical orders continued to come from the monarch.

On 27 December 1272, King D. Afonso III conceded a foral (charter) to the settlements of Mogadouro and Penas Róias (which was updated a year later), aiming to increase the settlement and defense of the region. São Mamede de Mogadouro continued to function as signeurial fiefdom of the Templars, which transformed it into a commandery, and subsequently elevated it to priory. Consolidation of the religious orders resulted in the 1319 transfer of settlement to the Order of Christ. Throughout this century the castle was expanded and walls reinforced.

During the Dynastic Crisis in 1383, Mogadouro aligned with Castile.

By 1433, it was donated to Álvaro Pires de Távora, whose father had been the alcaide of the castle.

King D. John II visited the settlement in the autumn of 1483 (as referred in the Crónica de Rui de Pina). Transiting the region during a trip between Lamego to Vila Real (en route to Bragança), he stopped in Port and visited places along the Trás-os-Montes and Resende (as recorded by Rui de Pina), when he ordered repairs to the site.

In 1507, the O Tombo da Comenda of the Order of Christ described the residence as a "house that was once the resting place for the prior and now Álvaro Pires de Távora's stable, while to the east and west are houses of said Álvaro Pires, to the north the wall and to the south part of the courtyard of the said castle. It is one-storey and from four-and-a-half long varas to measure the cloth and other so many of wide."

Between 1509 and 1510, Duarte D'Armas designed the castle in his Book of Fortresses, which he represented with an elliptical irregular barbican, crowned with merlons, except "a barrier without crenels toppled to the ground and the inside wall", addorsed in the corner by a small rectangular tower. This tower was only in the early stages of construction. At the time, the castle was an irregular polygon, with two towers in the north, one pentagonal and the other rectangular, with a semi-circular corbel. Within the structure was a military square with two ruined buildings and 11 chambers, rectangular and trapezoidal, a few with roof and cylindrical chimneys. In addition, there was a rectangular keep tower, with arrow-slits, that was built over cliffs, addorsed by residence of the Paço dos Távoras (consisting of three rectangular spaces of different heights). The one alongside the keep was the shortest, and included a full arch and four rectangular windows; the space, taller, included two-floors illuminated by arched windows with wooden balcony and topped by merlons; and the final, slightly shorter, included full-arch windows on the first floor and rectangular windows on the second-floor, surmounted by merlons. Access to the fortress was made by means of stairs at right angle, under which is a passage military square, with a circular well. Outside the walls, to addorsed to the east is a rabbit shed attached to the barbican, and from the same location extended the town, with its pillory. Opposite the houses on the outskirts of the village, was a church with steeple next to the barbican, and further away, a cross and five houses with cultivated lands.

A new foral was issued in 1512 by D. Manuel (1495–1521), as the Távoras expanded their role in the defense of the Trás-os-Montes Province, until the end of the 17th century (at the time of the Portuguese Restoration War). In the 17th century a clock tower was constructed.

Engravings and sketches from the 18th century, described the "Palace, that they call a castle". But, in the second half of the 18th century, following the tragic fate of the Távoras, and the loss of its defensive role, the castle was gradually abandoned, falling into ruins.

The first major work to repair the site began in 1950 that concentrated on the walls and tower under the direction of the DGMEN Direcção Geral dos Edifícios e Monumentos Nacionais (General-Directorate on Buildings and National Monuments). In the following years there was work leveling the ground, re-construction of the tower wall. During this period, there was surveys of the land around the site. Subsequent years (1957–1959) included restoration of the walls, the keep tower and consolidation of the foundations, that included cleaning and landscaping.

During the 1990s, the tower was vandalized, resulting in the destruction of the handrail and the entranceway, as well as the archaeological artefacts warehoused onsite. As a consequence, the property began to be administered by the Instituto Português do Património Arquitetónico on 1 June 1992, (under Decree 106F/92, Diário da República, Série 1A, 126). In 1993, during one of the worst winters, the clock tower was damaged.

== Architecture ==
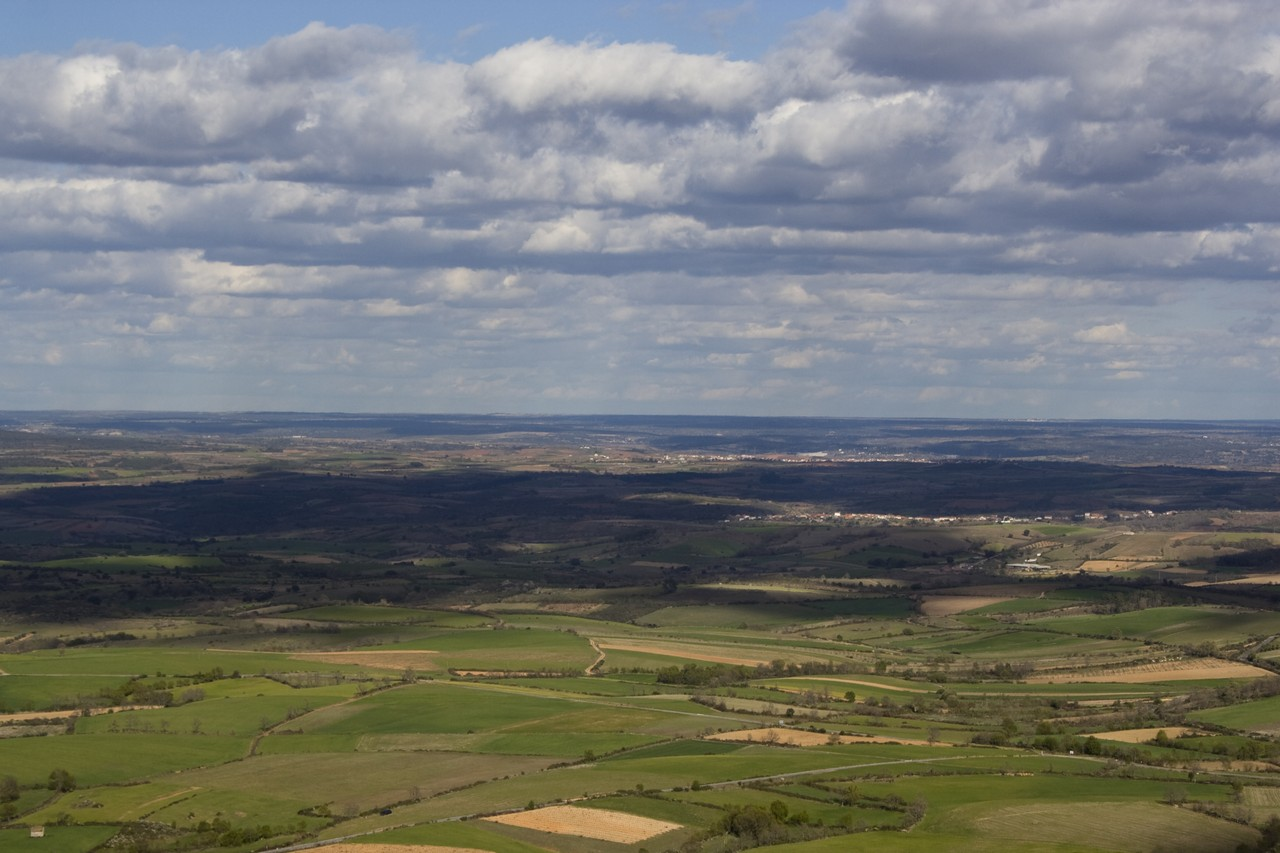
A view of the plains of Serra do Mogadouro

The remnants of the castle are implanted on a hilltop of rocks and cliff, with a view of the Serra de Mogadouro to the south. Alongside are the Torre do Relógio (Clock tower of Mogadouro), a palace/residence in ruins, the Chapel of the Misericórdia, pillory and section of the stations of the cross.

The castle structure includes a few lines of walls, the rectangular keep tower addorsed in the southeast by a line of walls, the former-castle residence and corner wall, accessed from an arch, and another line of walls that connects the residence to a small trapezoidal tower.

The keep tower was erected over a rocky hilltop, and included two arched doors in the northeast and southeast, accessible from two flights of stairs and landing. In the northwest, is a rectangular window with grade, surmounted by an arrow-slit and in the southwest by two slits on both registers. Along the western part of the tower is a rectangular cistern, while to the southeast are remnants of the former-barbican.

== See also ==
- Knights Templar in Portugal
