= Castelo de Oleiros =

Castle in Bragança, Portugal

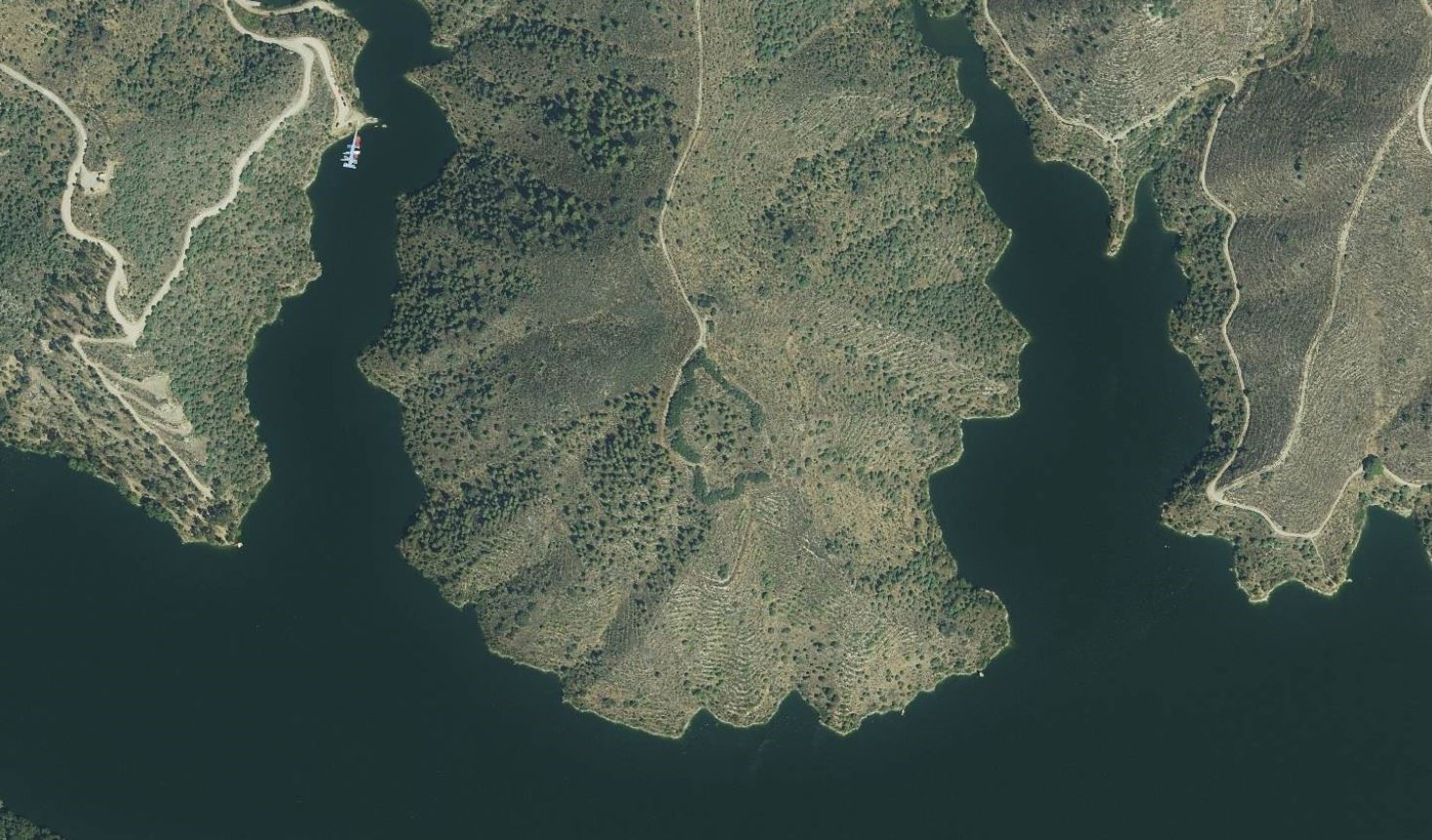
- The castle on the Oleiros hill on the Douro river, in the border Portugal-Spain
- Interactive map of the Castelo de Oleiros area

General information
- Location: Urrós (Mogadouro), Bragança, Portugal
- Owner: Portuguese Republic

Website
- Oleiros Castle

Oleiros Castle (Portuguese: Castelo de Oleiros) is a medieval castle located closed to Urrós, civil parish of Mogadouro, Valverde, Vale de Porco e Vilar de Rei, municipality of Mogadouro, district of Bragança, in Portugal, at an elevation of 482 meters (1581 ft) above sea level. The access is by leaving Mogadouro on the EN 221 for about 20 km (32 mi), then taking the EN 221-7 for 3 km (4,8 mi) and turning left onto the road.

== History ==
The Castle of Oleiros is an archaeological site consisting of the remains of a Reconquista castle, built on a previous Hillfort fortified in the 9th century.

It is believed that, due to its border importance and its condition as a fortified village, the Lord of the Castle was elevated to Baron by Mendo I Gonçalves of County of Portugal in the 10th century.

Once the frontier was consolidated, after the Treaty of Alcañices in 1297, the inhabitants abandoned the fortified town to found the current Urrós (Mogadouro), whose lands were ceded for their free exploration as villain-inheritors, although dependent on the Lordship of Algoso.

According to the Population Register of the Kingdom, in 1527 the village of the castle was already uninhabited. In 1684 the Castle of Oleiros is still mentioned, but it was in ruins and without military functions. Its remains were practically destroyed by the Spaniards during the Seven Years' War.

== Characteristics ==
Oleiros Castle has its origins in a Watchtower using the ruins of the ancient Lusitanian Hillfort located in a gorge on the Douro river.

The reuse of old Hillforts as new castles was not uncommon. They are also built on forts or Castelo de Mós, which in 1285 was stripped to support the Castelo de Torre de Moncorvo and the Castro de São Brás, which in 1287 were also built to support Torre de Dona Chama.

Its location was strategic because it was on a high bank of the river where the indentation of the river made it difficult for people and livestock to pass through. This facilitated the natural delimitation of the border.

Castelo de Oleiros is classified as Property of Public Interest, by Decree published on 17 July 1990. In 2020, conservation work began on the Castle of Oleiros, inaugurated in 2023 by the City Council of Mogadouro.

== See also ==
- Portuguese nobility
- List of baronies in Portugal
