= Mogadouro Municipal Chamber =

Legislative body of Mogadouro

Coordinates: 41.34042°N 6.71604°W

Mogadouro Municipal Chamber Câmara Municipal do Mogadouro
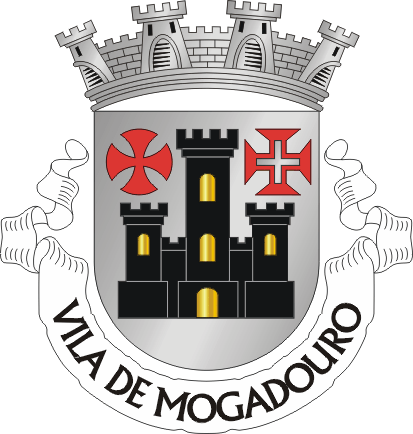
- Coat of arms of the city of Mogadouro

Type
- Type: Câmara municipal
- Term limits: 3

History
- Founded: 18 November 1273; 752 years ago

Leadership
- President: António Joaquim Pimentel, PSD since 20 October 2021
- Vice President: António Francisco Sebastião, PSD since 20 October 2021

Structure
- Seats: 5
- Political groups: Municipal Executive (3) PSD (3) Opposition (2) PS (2)
- Length of term: Four years

Elections
- Last election: 26 September 2021
- Next election: Sometime between 22 September and 14 October 2025

Meeting place
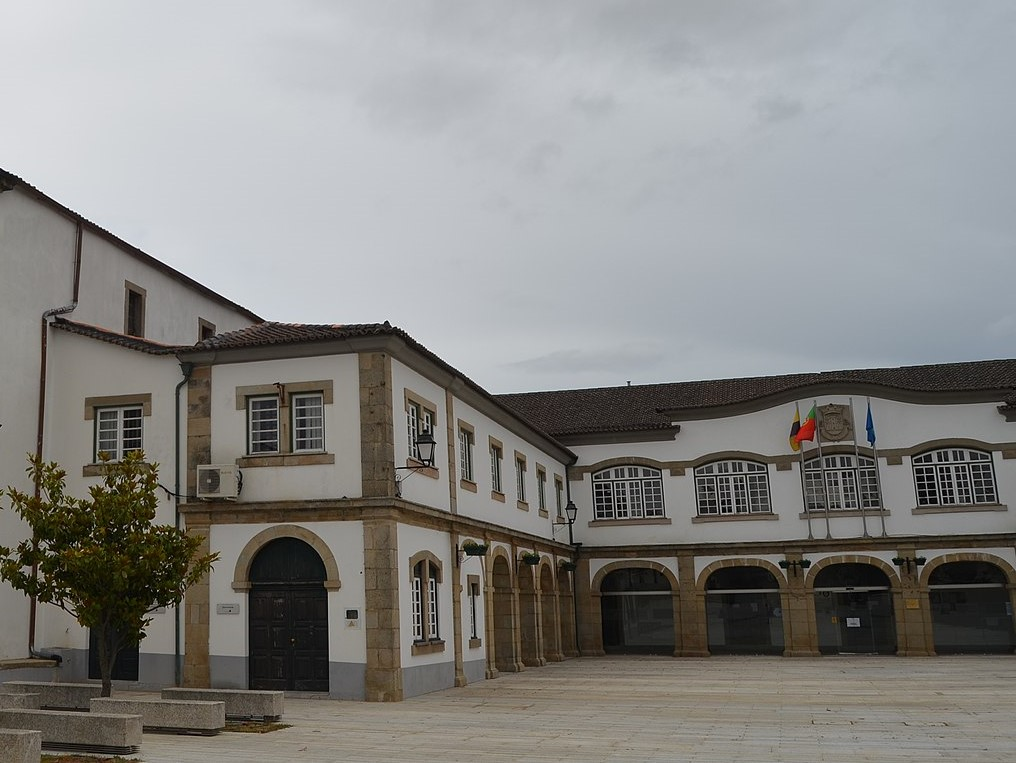
- Paços do Concelho do Mogadouro

Website
- www.mogadouro.pt

The Mogadouro Municipal Chamber (Portuguese: Câmara Municipal do Mogadouro) is the administrative authority in the municipality of Mogadouro. It has 21 freguesias in its area of jurisdiction and is based in the city of Mogadouro, on the Bragança District. These freguesias are: Azinhoso; Bemposta; Bruçó; Brunhoso; Brunhozinho, Castanheira e Sanhoane; Castelo Branco; Castro Vicente; Meirinhos; Mogadouro, Valverde, Vale de Porco e Vilar de Rei; Paradela; Penas Roias; Peredo da Bemposta; Remondes e Soutelo; Saldanha; São Martinho do Peso; Tó; Travanca; Urrós; Vale da Madre; Vila de Ala and Vilarinho dos Galegos e Ventozelo.

The Mogadouro City Council is made up of 5 councillors, having 7 until the 2021 local elections, with them representing, currently, two different political forces. The first candidate on the list with the most votes in a municipal election or, in the event of a vacancy, the next candidate on the list, takes office as President of the Municipal Chamber.

== List of the Presidents of the Municipal Chamber of Mogadouro ==
- António Abílio Costa – (1976–1987)
- Armando Venâncio Salomé – (1987–1993)
- Francisco Castro Pires – (1993–2001)
- António Morais Machado – (2001–2013)
- Francisco Guimarães – (2013–2021)
- António Joaquim Pimentel – (2021–2025)

(The list is incomplete)
