= Castle of Algoso =

Medieval castle in Algoso, Portugal

- Castelo de Algoso
- Bragança, Beira Interior Sul, Centro in Portugal
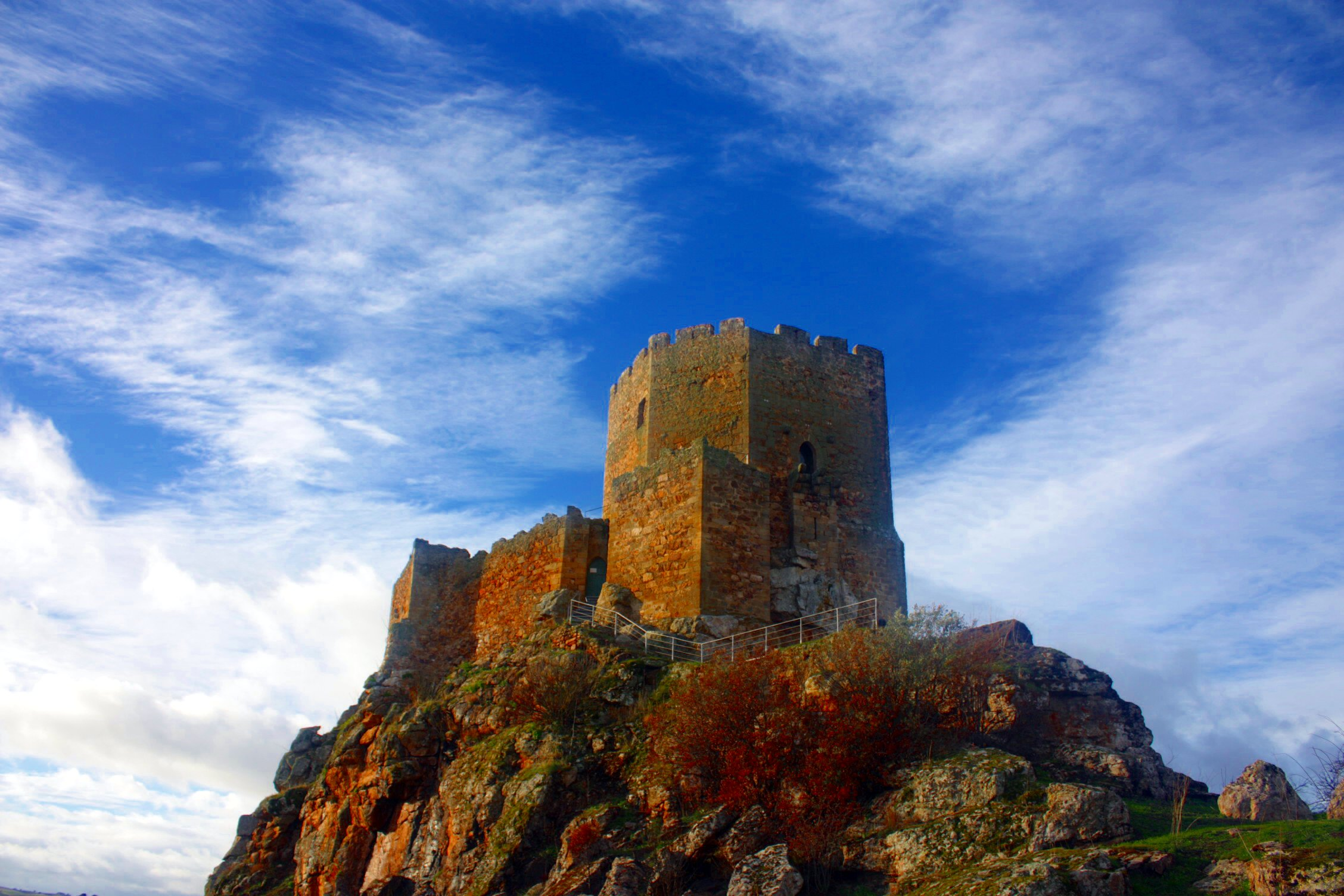
- A view of the castle from the pedregulhos of the cliff face that surrounds it

Site information
- Type: Castle
- Owner: Portuguese Republic
- Operator: DRCNorte (by dispatch 829/2009; Diário da República, Série II, 163; 24 August 2009)
- Open to the public: Public
- Condition: Ruins
- Website: http://www.valesdevimioso.pt/tours/centro-de-acolhimento-do-castelo-de-algoso/

Location
- Coordinates: 41°27′41″N 6°34′45″W

Site history
- Built: Chalcolthic
- Built by: Mendo Bofino
- Materials: Granite, Quartz schist
- Battles/wars: Treaty of Zamora, Reconquista, Portuguese succession crisis of 1580, Portuguese Restoration War, Seven Years' War

Garrison information
- Occupants: Mendes and Rodrigues de Algoso noble families

The Castle of Algoso (Portuguese: Castelo de Algoso) (Mirandese: Castielho d’Algoso) is a medieval castle in the civil parish of Algoso, Campo de Víboras e Uva, municipality of Vimioso, in the Portuguese district of Bragança. The castle of Algoso is one of the most important medieval fortifications in the eastern Trás-os-montes, related with the battles of Leonese succession, the tentative policies of the independent Portuguese monarch and the important religious commandery of the Knights Hospitaller that established their roots in 1224.

The castles of Bragança, Outeiro (Bragança), Castle of Algoso and Castle of Miranda do Douro, supported by the small fortresses of Vimioso and Penas Roias, formed the northwest defensive line of the Kingdom of Portugal with the Kingdom of León, which in 1493 the king John II of Portugal called the “corregimento das fortresses of Trallos Montes”.

In a dominant position over the top of Penenciada, it dominates the surrounding plain and the confluence of the Angueira and the Maçãs rivers. In the region of North Region, Portugal, from the top of its walls you can see Serra da Sanábria, Serra de Bornes and of Serra da Nogueira. It has a 360 degree view of the Mirandese platea, located at an altitude of 690 meters, next to the Angueira river.

== History ==
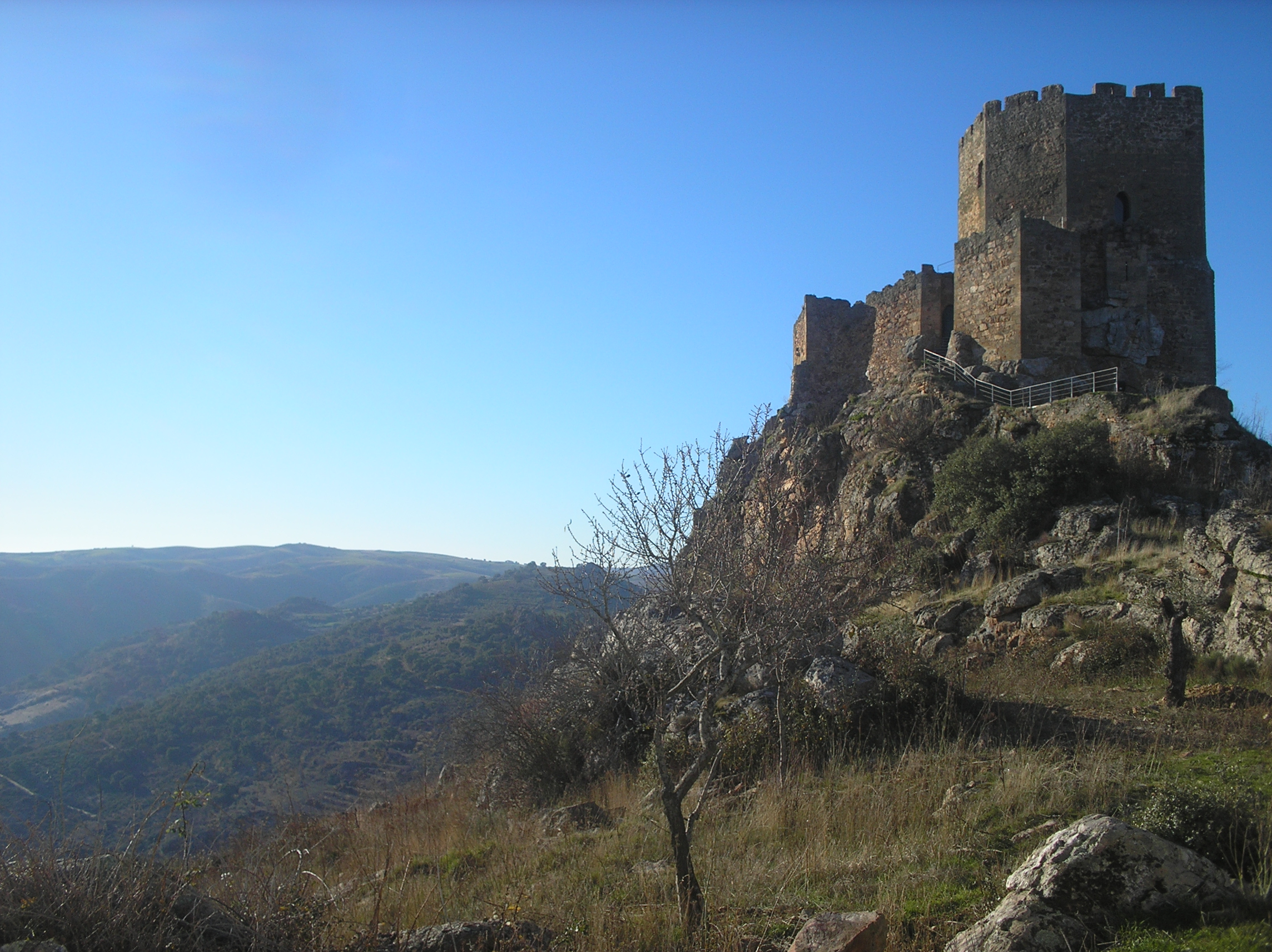
A view of the landscape surrounding the medieval castle and keep

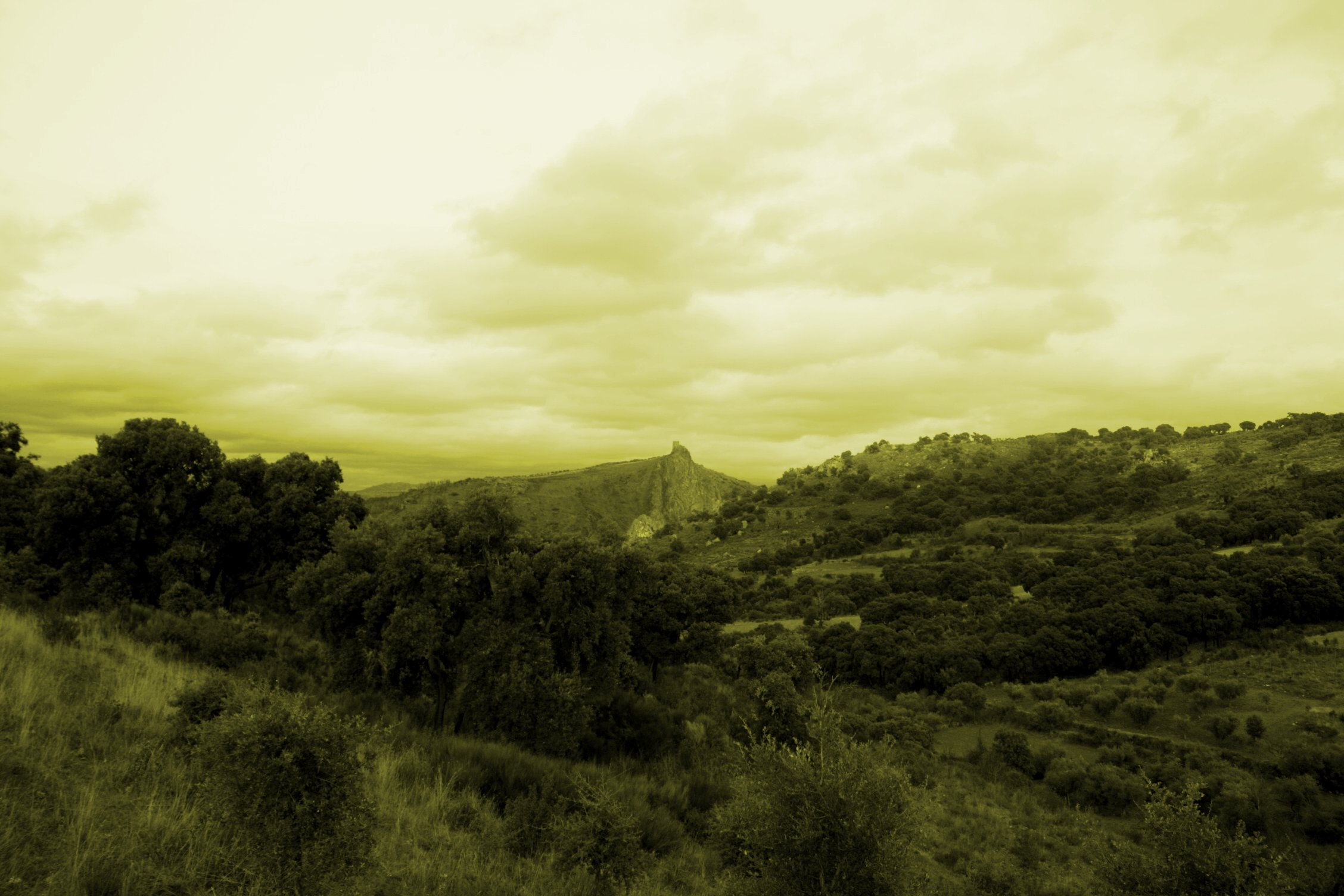
A distant perspective of the castle as its situated on the mountaintop

Archaeological excavations permit conclusions associated with early settlement before the Middle Ages, there existed a castle on the current site, that supported various settlements, identified with the Chalcolithic period (that include Bronze Age moulds), proto-historic and Roman (such as the discovery of ceramics associated with a period of non-military settlement).

=== Medieval ===
During the Christian Reconquista, the primitive frontier of the County of Portugal with the Kingdom of León extended along the left bank of the Sabor River, to its confluence with the Angueira River. This link was watched by various sentinel outposts: the Castle of Milhão, the Castle of Santulhão (both today long disappeared), the Castle of Outeiro de Miranda (in ruins) and in the eastern edge, the Castle of Algoso. The remainder of the principal defense occurred in the northwest, across the protector of the Castles of Penas Róias, Mogadouro and Bragança.

Sometime during the 12th century, D. Mendo Rufino (or Bofino), master of the lands of "Ulgoso" by donation of D. Afonso Henriques, ordered the construction of a fortress, in order to watch and guard the frontier with the Kingdom of León. From information during the 1258 Inquirições, Mendo Rufino (who was one of the supporters of Afonso Henriques against D. Teresa) constructed the castle in exchange for the village of Vimioso, where he died and whose majorado was taken over by his son Afonso Mendes. The Majorat of Algoso was assumed by his son Rodrigo Mendes, who as stalished in the document assumed the family name Rodrigues de Algoso and as established in the document assumed the Lordship of Algoso, later Count.

During this period of uncertainty that is the transition between Afonso Henriques reign as first Portuguese monarch, and the exercise of regal power by Sancho I, the castle became an important link with loyal nobility, which had ties to the corte of León, but harboured loyalties with the Portuguese. As the "head" of the Terra da Miranda, Algoso was an important fortress; a "nuclear point of support with the regal authority" in this peripheric region.

Unfortunately, little remains of the early construction, although it assumed that the castle was built on the Romanesque principals of the time, that included a keep tower surrounded by a walled fortification and battlements. Yet, little remains to suggest that was the case, since no archaeological surveys are related with this period, and that many of the 12th century fragments may have been swept away by events in the subsequent years. Between the 12th and 13th century, the alcaide offered the castle to King D. Sancho I, who compensated his captain, by offering him the title of master of Vimioso, which was conferred on Mendo Rufino. The King planned of transforming Algoso into the centre of his vast territory, encompassing the area of Miranda do Douro and Penas Róias. But, between 1212 and 1213, the lands were invaded by troops loyal to the King of León, Alfonso IX, as a reprisal for the contestation of the Portuguese King against the donations of his sisters. Following a period of turmoil, in 1219, peace was brokered between the Kingdoms of León and Portugal.

In April 1224, the primitive structure was radically altered. That year (or just before it) the castle was donated by King Sancho II to the Knights Hospitaller, after a long period of war with the Kingdom of León. At that time, the expansion of regal authority in the Trás-os-Montes Province privileged the creation of new towns, of an urban character, and relegating the existing castles into defensive military structures that expressed regal authority in the lands of Miranda and Pena Roias. The castle with "all its terms and belongings" were extended, therefore, to prior D. Rui Pais and his "successors, brother monks". The town and municipality of Ylgoso, Ulgoso ou São Sebastião de Algoso, was part of the bishopric and district of Bragança.

In 1230, the Knights Templar and the Knights Hospitaller came to a concordat in Coimbra, over various lands held between them, including Ylgoso (Algoso), Vila Chã, Atenor, Penas Róias, Paradela and others, outside the bishopric of Bragança. On 22 June 1239, D. Pedro Costem, commander of the Order of the Temple established his commandery of Mogadouro and Pena Roias, that included Algoso. But, later, on 13 February 1291, King D. Dinis (1279-1325) reestablished in Coimbra, that D. Fernão Peres (o Mossejo), would hold the commandery of Algoso and other lands within its range. These changes had an effect on the annual rents paid by their commander: between 7000 and 8000 cruzados, including products from the abbeys of Travanca, Sendim, Vilar Seco, Duas Igrejas and Guide. The castle, therefore, became a focus of a primitive church, dedicated to Nossa Senhora da Assunção(Our Lady of the Assumption), but became known as Our Lady of the Castle by peasantry and gentry.

In the hands of the Hospitaller monks, the castle was transformed into a Gothic fortress, characterized by an active defense policy. During this period the heptagonal keep tower was constructed, in order to better resist attacks and providing a more adequate availability of angles to inflict damage on aggressors. This included vertical attacks, with the existence of machicolations over the entranceway and that served as the residence of the commander.

During the 1258 Inquirições, the castle was referenced as in a donation to the Knights Hospitaller, by name of D. Afonso Henriques or D. Sancho II.

The commander of the Order, Father Pedro Lourenço, in 1291, appeared in a dispute between the King (then D. Dinis) and the Knights Hospitaller; in this dispute the Knights Hospitaller and Command of Ulgoso were united in their afront of the King, and included the villages of Serapicos, Vila Chã da Beira, Uva, Mora, Saldanha, Sendim, Picote, Vilar Seco, Vinhão and couples of Cerceo.

Seven years later, D. Dinis ordered the reconstruction of the fortress.

In August 1341, a sentence from King D. Afonso IV informed that, in that year, Father D. Álvaro Gonçalves Pereira was the "Prior of Hospital in his kingdoms, that he pertained to the Castle of Ulgoso with its term since time in memorial".

In 1480, King D. Afonso V signed a foral (charter) for the settlement, which was later conceded by King D. Manuel I in 1510. By 1530, the castle included cisterns and residences, but that only the alcaide resided in the building.

During the Portuguese succession crisis of 1580, Diogo Fernandes de Almeida (the alcaide of the castle) took sides with the António, Prior of Crato. On his accession to the throne of Portugal, Philip I favoured and conceded privileges on municipality of Algoso (1 January 1592), putting the castle authority and noble's allegiance into question. In 1588, though, Friar Gonçalo de Azevedo, a Knight Hospitaller, and son of Diogo Almeida, was nominated by King Philip I, to act as alcaide and commander at the castle. But, this period of interrupted authority would have an effect on the importance of the fortification. It is unclear of the state of the fortifications during the intervening years, such that by the 17th century, the castle was already abandoned, and the settlement of Algoso took on a larger role in regional authority. On 22 June 1684, the archive of the commandery of Algoso included a description of the furniture and state of conservation of the castle, but the structures were abandoned and in a state of ruin.

By 1684, there were many military structures abandoned or ruined within the kingdom. At the end of the Seven Years' War, following the sack of Miranda do Douro in 1762, the Spanish plundered many of the villages and buildings of Vimioso. Garrisoned by a small contingent, under the command of an ensign, the town of Algoso resisted Spanish troops. Much later, the military government was exercised by a captain, sergeant and four ordenanças captains. During that time, between 1689 and 1690, the municipality of Vimioso attempted work to consolidate and restore the structure.

The last occupation by military forces occurred in 1710, during the War of Spanish Succession.

During the Peninsular War, the judge of Algoso, Jacinto de Oliveira Castelo Branco, refused to accept French sovereignty and, even after the Transfer of the Portuguese Court to Brazil, following the French declaration of the extinction of the Bragança Dynasty, continued to use the titles of privilege conferred on his family. By the middle of the 19th century, Algoso was integrated into the municipality of Vimioso (1855).

=== 20th century ===
In June 1944, the municipality requested the DGEMN perform work on the property.

In June 1974 it was necessary to unobstruct the tower, consolidate the masonry walls and reinforce the vaulted ceilings. The principal tower and cistern were cleared and renovated during this time, but further work on the walls was needed in the intervening years, that included the consolidation of various points with schist masonry and clay cement and sand. At this time, there was an effort to raise the battlements along the southern and eastern walls. This was followed in 1977 by conservation of the walls and battlements, including consolidation of the access stairs to the castle. The battlements along various points (eastern, near the cistern and southeast) were carried out to prevent landslides. Excess vegetation was cleared from within the walls, opening up the spaces for future observation.

On 1 June 1992, the property became the responsibility of the Instituto Português do Património Arquitetónico (Portuguese Institute for Architectural Patrimony), by decree law 106F/92 (Diário da República, Série 1A, 126). From 1999 the IPPAR began refurbishing and upkeep on the castle, including requalifying the zone around the castle, with repaving, the addition of stone bunks along the south wall, exterior illumination, resurfacing the roadway to the castle, installation of metal rails for the staircase, cleaning of the cistern and correcting irregularities in the structure. Similar projects were carried out in 2000 (such as weather treatment, consolidation of tower and ceilings), while excavations were carried out within the structure beginning in 2001.

A protocol was signed in 2002 between the municipality of Vimioso and the IPPAR to transform the property into a museum, resulting in the construction of an interpretative centre in 2006 by the IPPAR.

== Architecture ==
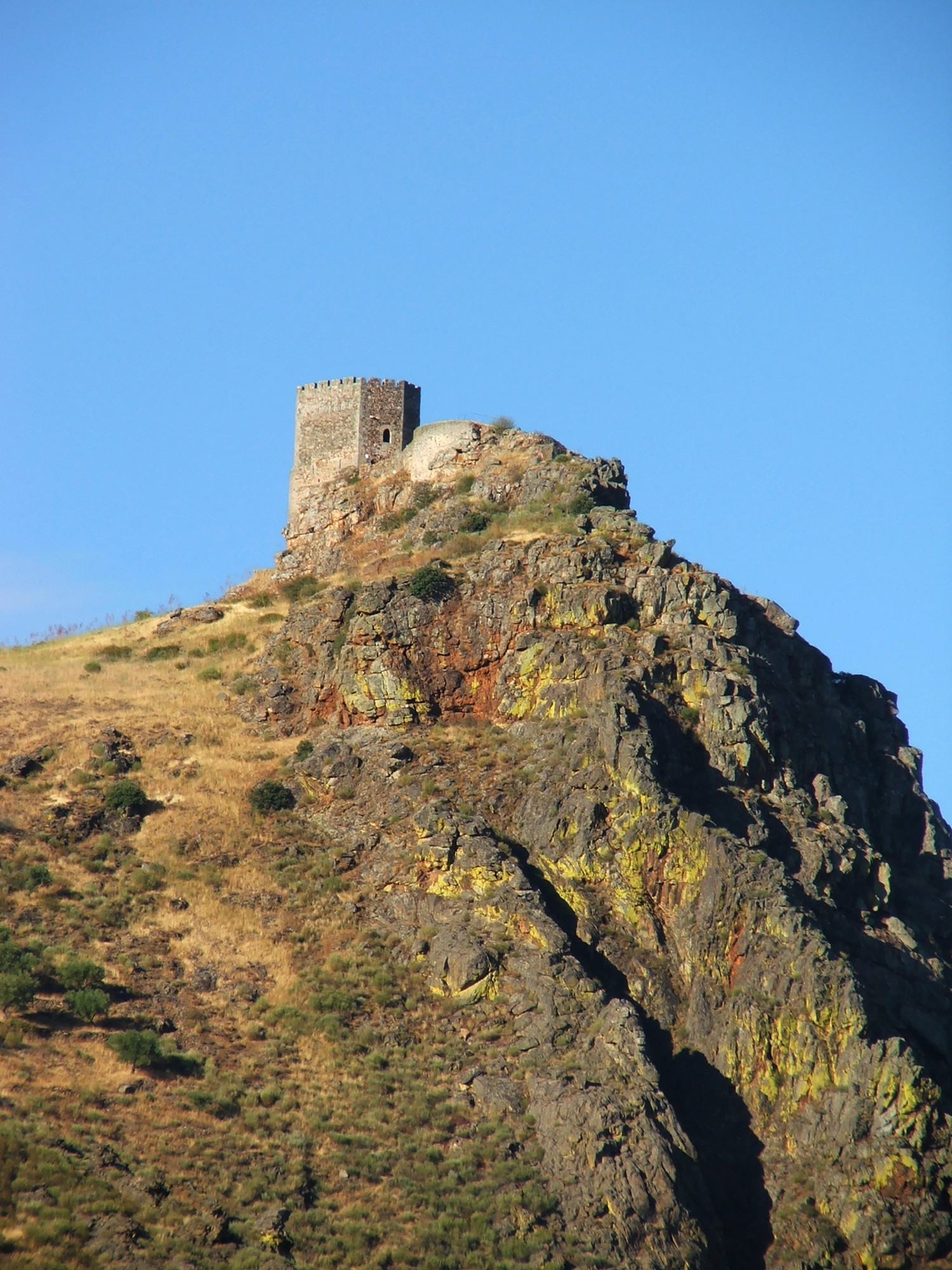
A view of the escarpment of Cabeço da Penenciada

The castle is situated in a rural countryside, isolated on a soft escarpment 690 metres (2,260 ft) above sea level, called the Cabeço da Penenciada overlooking the right margin of the Angueira River. The stone castle is designed in a rectangular layout, with corbel walls and a three-story square keep tower with a Gothic access doorway; the superior accessway in similar pointed arch and machicolations, is crowned by merlons with arrowslits. In addition to rectangular cistern, with vaulted interior, the castle includes a primitive military square.

The remnants of the small rock castle and few lines of wall fortifications are interrupted by stones and cliff faces, approximately 12 metres (39 ft) tall. In addition to its keep tower, the walls include a few cubelos (circular towers) and small "patio" area that functioned as a small military square. On the wall is a square cubelo and in the north, a doorway with frame of arches protected by barbican with similar cubelos lacking bastions.

The keep tower, constructed in an irregular polygonal shape, includes large stone corners, and was constructed three-floors high. The Gothic second floor doorway includes a frame and remnants of machicolations. Within the tower are vestiges of the three floors, with the first two used as residences and the last for defense (as evidenced by the merlons and arrowslits): both areas include vaulted ceilings. Sometime during its period of use, the medieval architects constructed a wall that divided the two floors into two dependencies.

In front of the tower, are remnants of smaller buildings, that correspond to the primitive stables and kitchen. Generally, the area within the walls are cramped and dominated by large stones of various dimensions. A primitive irregular cistern is also situated within the walls of the fortification; 30 by 30 metres (98 ft × 98 ft) and 3 metres (9.8 ft) high, the vaulted cistern has a capacity to store 90,000 litres (20,000 imp gal) of water.

== See also ==
- Portuguese nobility
- List of countships in Portugal
