= Castle of Penas Róias =

- Castelo de Penas Róias
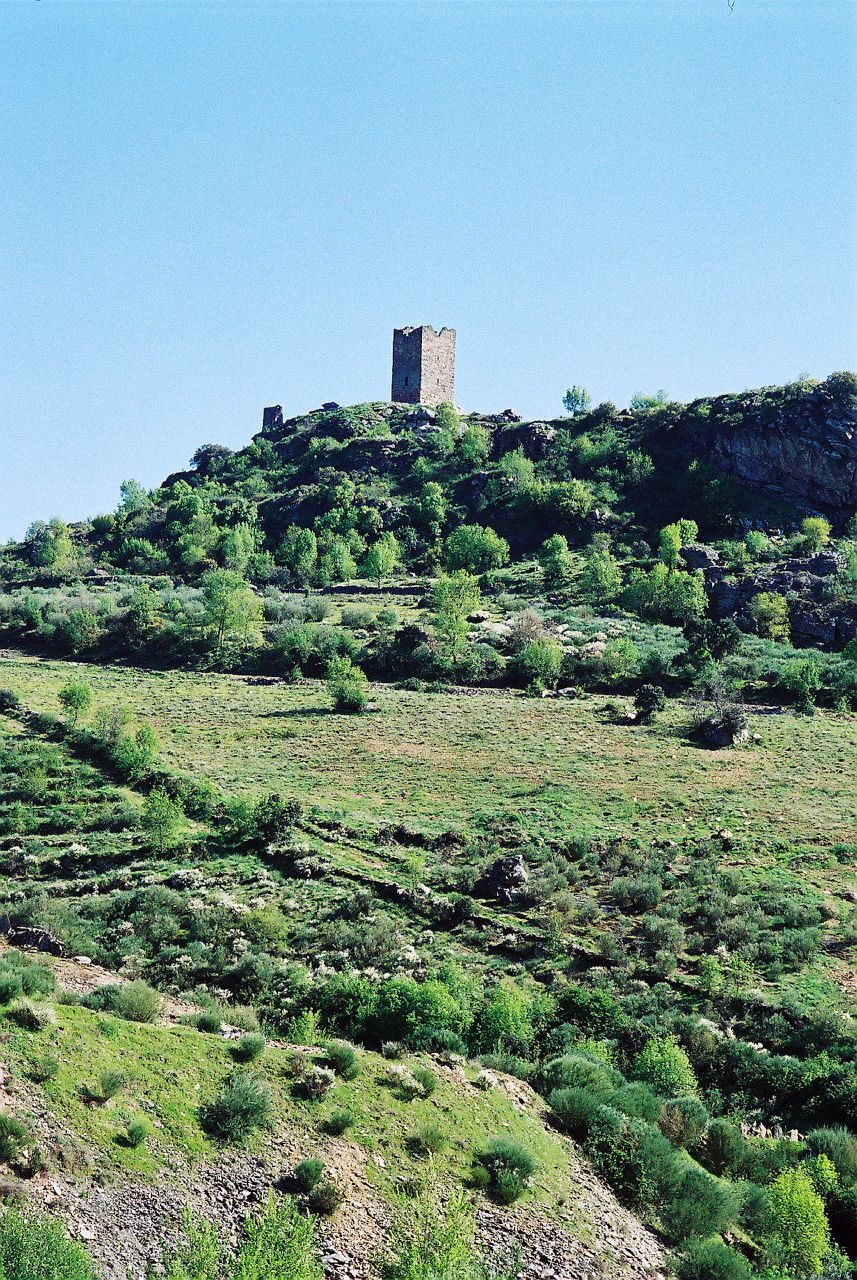
- Interactive map of the Castle of Penas Róias area

General information
- Location: Penas Róias, Mogadouro municipality, Bragança district, Portugal
- Coordinates: 41.392233°N 6.65415°W
- Construction started: 1166

The Castle of Penas Roias (Portuguese: Castelo de Penas Roias) is a Portuguese medieval castle in the civil parish of Penas Roias, municipality of Mogadouro, in the Portuguese of district of Bragança.

The castle is a grand castle that stood upon a hill. From the castle walls, one can see other castles such as the Braganza Vimioso Castle, Castle of Miranda do Douro, the Castle of Rebordãos and the Castle of Outeiro.

== History ==
=== Early history ===
Little is known about early human occupation of the region. Archaeological evidence point to a proto-historical occupation of the site. When the Romans invaded the Iberian Peninsula, the site had been abandoned.

=== Medieval Era ===
During the midst of the Christian Reconquest, the region was conquered by the kingdom of León.

With the assertion of the independence of the Kingdom of Portugal by Afonso I of Portugal. To this end, Afonso Henriques (1112-1185) has delegated to the Order of the Knights Templar for the task of strengthening access to south and east of the river Mondego.

The domain Penas Róias were donated in 1145, to the Order of Aviz. This date coincides with archaeological evidence of its occupation in the twelfth century.

1166 is traditionally claimed as the start year of the construction of the castle, although the inscription on the Donjon has quite deteriorated. It can, however, be read dating to 1172 or 1181. During the reign of Sancho I (1185-1211), efforts were undertaken to repopulate the village, which soon enough became the county seat. During this time, the Order of Avis moved their efforts more south to Beira Baiza, having received the domains of Idanha-a-Velha and Monsanto. Under the reign of King Afonso III (1248-1279), the village is referred to the inquiries of 1258, and received a new Foral Charter in 1272. It was also renewed the following year in 1273. King Dinis transferred the domain of Penas Róias to the Order of Christ in 1319. It is believed that reconstruction efforts strengthened during this time.

The castle and the village were recorded in the iconography of Duarte de Armas (Book of Fortresses, c. 1509) as having extensive walls. In 1521, King Manuel I (1495-1521) awarded the village a new Foral Charter.

=== 20th century and the modern day ===
Over the years, the castle slowly fell out of use and left untouched. Due to the centuries of neglect, the castle slowly decayed due to the onslaught of the weather. By the 20th century, the majority of the castle was in ruins.

The castle is classified as National Monument by Decree published on 20 March 1945.

The Portuguese national government intervened between 1977 and 1978 by initiating works of reconstruction and reparation of the walls and the Keep. The old Templar castle is mostly in ruin with the exception of a tower and the old medieval walls and turrets.

== Characteristics ==
The castle and its neighboring village was built in Romanesque style, its walls reinforced by four turrets.

The site plan is extensive. At the center of the main square stands a quadrangular tower. In the south and east walls, the walls are covered in windows.

The west corner has a 6-meter-high (20 ft) door that originally led to a wooden staircase. Internally, the tower is divided into three floors. The tower is a small circular tower with a base. It once had a massive walled fence.

== See also ==
- Knights Templar in Portugal
