= Urrós =

Urrós may refer to:

== Places in Portugal ==
- Urrós (Mogadouro), a civil parish
- Urrós (Torre de Moncorvo), a former civil parish
- Urrós e Peredo dos Castelhanos, a current civil parish in Torre de Moncorvo

== Others ==
- Urrós halt, a disused station of the Sabor line
