= Castle of Mós =

Castle in Bragança District, Portugal

Coordinates: 41°09′36″N 6°54′31″W

Aerial view of the castle

The Castle of Mós (Portuguese: Castelo de Mós) is a medieval castle located in the civil parish of Mós, municipality of Torre de Moncorvo, in the Portuguese district of Bragança.

It is classified by IGESPAR as a Site of Public Interest.

Just north of the village, the castle was erected on a vegetation-heavy small hill called the Promenade de Mos, an ancient road axis in the region. There is also another Mos Castle in Mos, Vigo, Galicia.

== History ==
=== Ancient Times ===
Some evidence indicate that early human occupation of the region come from the Early Iron Age.

=== The medieval castle ===
The inner courtyard

Although there is little to no information on the founding or early history, the village secured a royal charter from Afonso I o Portugal (1112-1185) in 1162.

Under the reign of Sancho II of Portugal (1248-1279), inquiries in 1258 reported that the county held a third of the tithes from the Church of Santa Maria de Mos for the repair and maintenance of the town's castle. The source of the funds was explained in a letter Alfonso IV of Portugal (1325-1357) states that the sovereign granted the "people of the Church are giving money".

Near the end of the Middle Ages, fighting had depopulated the village and swung favor to the nearby village of Carviçais. During the reign of Fernando, he ended the power of the village and transferred it to Moncorvo Tower.

Some of the surviving wall

In the late seventeenth century, Father Carvalho da Costa recorded a similar position, stating that this villa one sees almost hum aruinado Castello delle with his cistern inside, which turns out to be the old village villa of more account. At this stage, the castle had only 90 fires, while in Carviçais neighbor, the only place term 250 were counted.

=== Nineteenth Century to the Modern Day ===
In the nineteenth century, the Municipality of Mos was abolished and integrated in the municipality of Torre de Moncorvo. The castle remains are classified as Public Interest Property by decree published on 20 October 1955. In the 1960s part of the medieval wall collapsed, registering a particular construction on a walled section. At the time, it was felt the intervention of the government by the action of DGEMN, through the reconstruction of a section of the wall and work in the surrounding area (1963). Currently there remain only traces of some sections of wall with addorsed dwelling houses. Outside the walls stand out the Church of Santa Maria and the pillory.

== Characteristics ==
The small castle has site design with oval format in the Romanesque style. The wall in shale rock girl is torn south through the door, communicating with the outskirts of the medieval village and the paths towards Freixo de Espada a Cinta, Alva, Moncorvo and Miranda Tower. Internally, the village is structured around the Straight Street, which defined a north-south axis. Extra walls were erected the Church of Santa Maria and on the opposite side, opposite to the castle gate, the square with the Town Hall and the pillory. The type of Mos village organization reveals a similar pattern to the Freixo de Espada a Cinta, and the Castle of Alva. Respect to Castle of Freixo de Espada a Cinta, roars and Alva, with which it has affinities, the Mos is the only one with the Church of Santa Maria located on the opposite side off developed opposite the main gate of the fence.
