= Urrós (Torre de Moncorvo) =

Extinct parish in Torre de Moncorvo, Portugal

- Civil parish
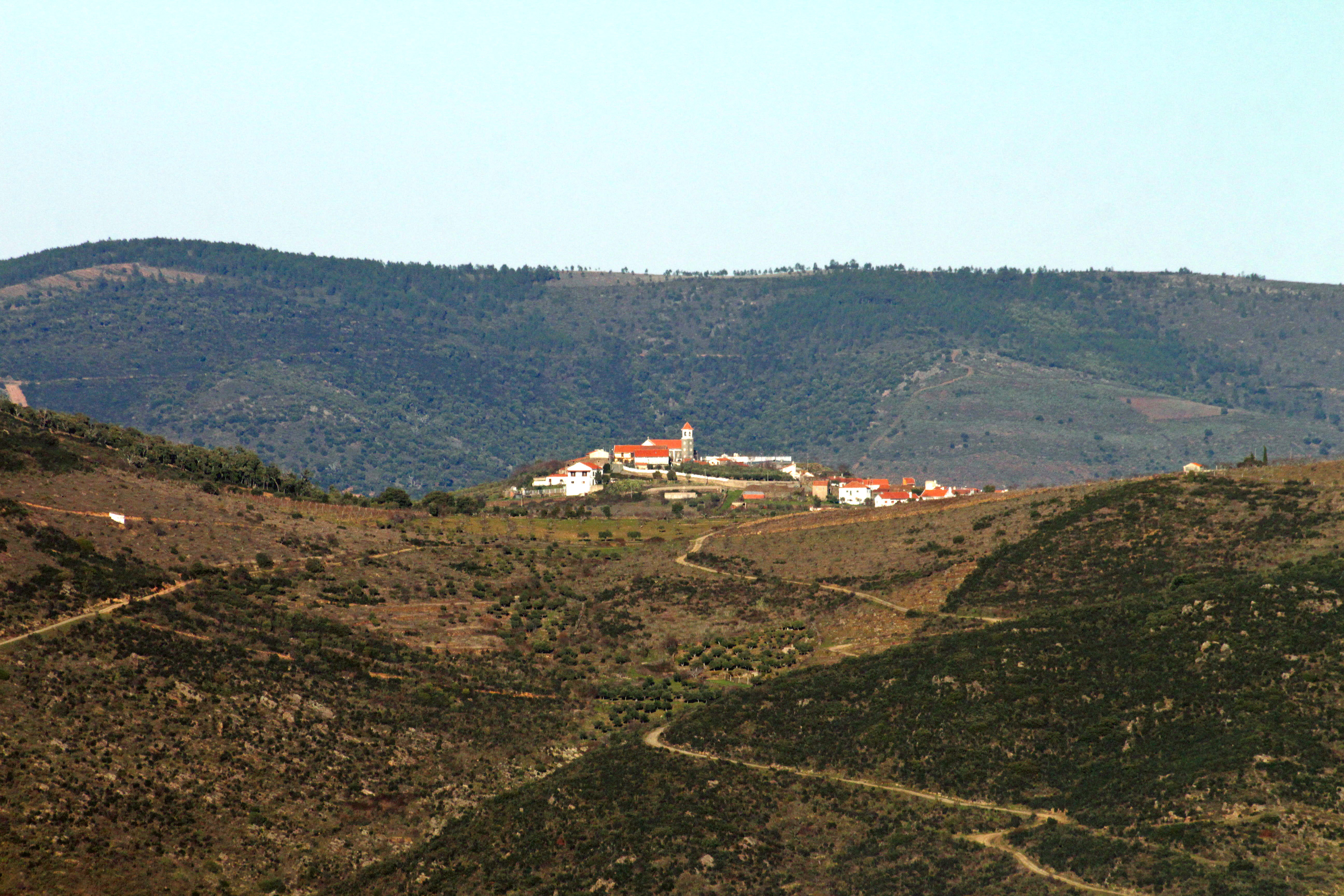
- Urrós in 2020

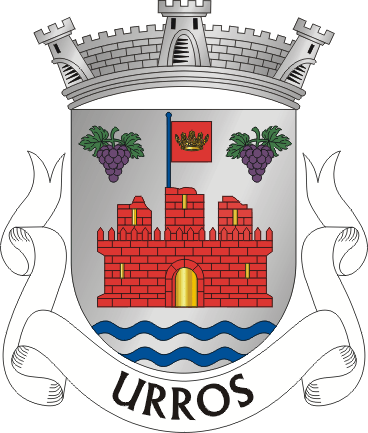
- Coat of arms

- Location in Portugal
- Coordinates: 41°4′58″N 7°1′22″W
- Country: Portugal
- Region: Norte
- Intermunic. comm.: Douro
- District: Bragança
- Municipality: Torre de Moncorvo

Area
  - Total: 57.43 km^{2} (22.17 sq mi)

Population (2011)
  - Total: 265
  - Density: 4.61/km^{2} (12.0/sq mi)
- Time zone: UTC+00:00 (WET)
  - Summer (DST): UTC+01:00 (WEST)

Urrós is a former parish of the municipality of Torre de Moncorvo, with an area of 57.43 km^{2} (22.17 sq mi) and 265 inhabitants (2011).

== Population ==
Population of the parish of Urrós

Year	Pop.	±%
1864	1,094	—
1878	1,222	+11.7%
1890	1,126	−7.9%
1900	1,225	+8.8%
1911	1,082	−11.7%
1920	959	−11.4%
1930	1,051	+9.6%
1940	1,155	+9.9%

Year	Pop.	±%
1950	1,125	−2.6%
1960	988	−12.2%
1970	624	−36.8%
1981	487	−22.0%
1991	428	−12.1%
2001	325	−24.1%
2011	265	−18.5%

== History ==
It was a fortified town in the High Middle Ages, having previously had castreja fortifications: the Castelo de Oleiros.

In Urrós there is a record of the last silk looms in Trás-os-Montes, which made the workshops in Bragança and Chacim famous.

In 2013, Urrós became part of the new parish of Urrós e Peredo dos Castelhanos.
