= Azinhoso =

- Civil parish
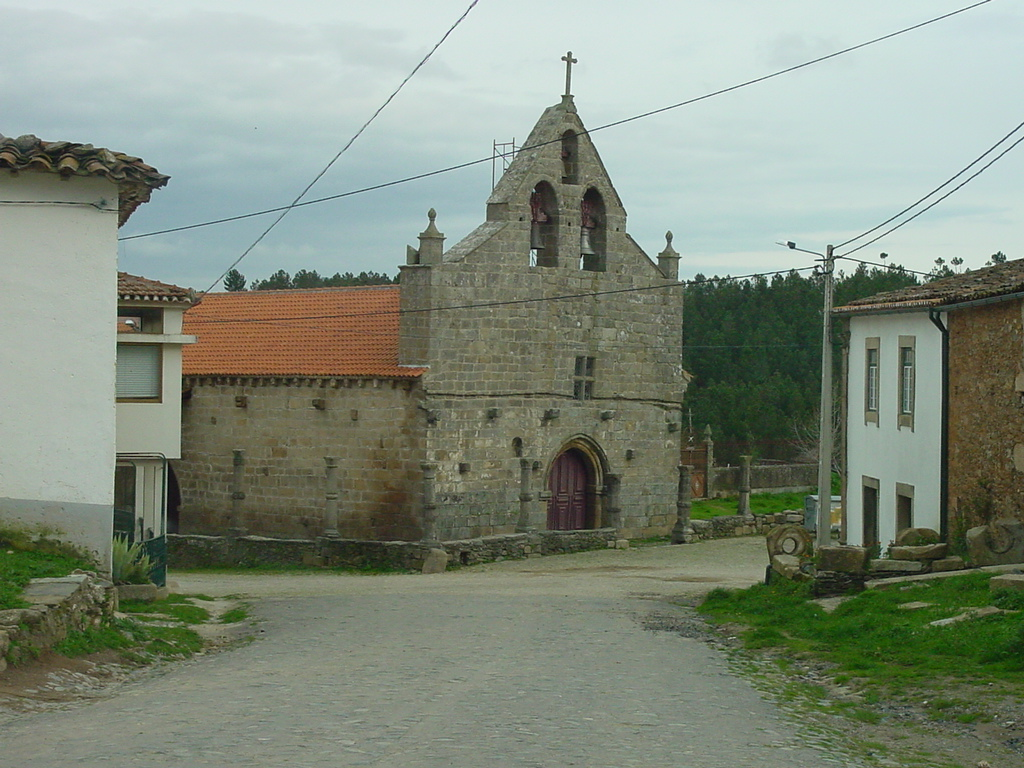
- Main Church in Azinhoso

- Location in Portugal
- Coordinates: 41.384°N 6.685°W
- Country: Portugal
- Region: Norte
- Intermunic. comm.: Terras de Trás-os-Montes
- District: Bragança
- Municipality: Mogadouro

Area
  - Total: 30.80 km^{2} (11.89 sq mi)

Population (2011)
  - Total: 307
  - Density: 9.97/km^{2} (25.8/sq mi)
- Time zone: UTC+00:00 (WET)
  - Summer (DST): UTC+01:00 (WEST)

Azinhoso is a Portuguese freguesia ("civil parish") in the Concelho of Mogadouro. The population in 2011 was 307, in an area of 30.80 km². It was parish and capital of Concelho between 1386 and the beginning of the 19th century. In 1801 it had 302 inhabitants.
