= Castle of Alva =

Portuguese medieval castle

- Castelo de Alva
- Bragança, Douro, Norte Region, Portugal in Portugal

Site information
- Type: Castle
- Owner: Portuguese Republic
- Open to the public: Public

Location
- Coordinates: 41.051814°N 6.908499°W

Site history
- Materials: Schist

The Castle of Alva (Portuguese: Castelo de Alva) is a medieval castle located in the civil parish of Viade de Baixo e Fervidelas, in the municipality of Freixo de Espada à Cinta, Portuguese district of Bragança.

== History ==
As part of the Leonese invasion, in June 1212, the first reference to the castle between Freixo de Espada à Cinta and Urros.

By 1236 it was occupied by Leonese forces with the consent of its inhabitants. Shortly after, King D. Sancho II donated the place to the municipality of Freixo "como sua aldeia" (with its village), ordering the expulsion of the residents who lived there during the Leonese occupation. At the time of the 1258 Inquirições (Inquiries) indicated that King Sancho had transferred the title to Freixo.

During the reign of King D. Dinis, the municipality of Alva requested that King expand its settlement of 400 residents. But, by 1311, in a letter, the King refused the request, owing to opposition from the municipality of Freixo.

Between 1527 and 1532, the village of Alva was not listed in the Numeramento, suggesting that the settlement no longer existed by the end of the 16th century.

During the 17th century, António Coelho Gasco, external judge and captain-major of the town of Freixo, described the state of abandonment that the structure, which he referred to as the "Antiquario" (antiquary), during a presentation on his visit to the Archbishop of Braga, D. Rodrigo da Cunha. By the end of the same century, Father Carvalho da Costa, referring to the limits of Poiares in the Corografia Portuguesa, included a small list of landmarks; this included the Hermitage of Nossa Senhora de Alva and "alongside it the ruined Castle with its walls, where in the past, was founded the Town of Alva", remembering that D. Sancho II had deprived the village of its residents. Continuing, that he:

"gave the village to Freixo and later, depopulated and ruined it, remaining only the boat, that navigated the river, with the name of Alva, and the referred Hermitage of Santa Maria, where is annexed a simple benefit of the Royal Patronage".

== Architecture ==
The castle is situated in an area of abundant archaeological vestiges; the parish of Poiares is located between the Serra do Marão and Serra de Avões, along the Couro and Douro Rivers in a rural area, situated on a 700 metres (2,300 ft) hilltop dominating the Douro valley. The actually location is covered in vegetation and olive orchards.
