= Castle of Outeiro =

Medieval castle in Bragança, Portugal

Coordinates: 41°40′58″N 6°35′30″W

Castle Hill Of Miranda
- Fortaleza do Outeiro

The Castle Hill of Miranda (Portuguese: Castelo do Outeiro do Miranda), also known as the Fortress Hill (Portuguese: Fortaleza do Outeiro), is a medieval castle located in the village of Outeiro in the district of Bragança, Portugal.

The castle sits in a dominant position atop the so-called Castle Hill. It is about one kilometer east of the municipality of Outeiro and halfway between the town of Braganca and Vimioso. This fortification has survived since the Middle Ages. It served as a sentry along the border of Tras-os-Montes with the kingdom of Leon.

== History ==
=== Early history ===
Despite its scarcity, archaeological evidence shows that early human occupation date back to at least the Roman presence. The arrival of the Romans transformed the region into an agricultural establishment.

=== Medieval era ===
The current structure dates back to the era of King Dinis (1279-1325). The castle was later mentioned as part of the village.

During the reign of King Ferdinand l, due to a clever ruse, the village was overrun by the forces of Henry II of Castile in the summer of 1369.

In the midst of the 1383–85 Portuguese succession crisis, the village sided with Princess Beatrice, Ferdinand I's daughter. Later, to encourage the strengthening its settlement and defense, the monarchy granted exemption from payment of tribute to all who build homes within the outer walls of the castle, then finished rebuild (1414), and extended his Council term (1418). From this period, the reconstruction greatly expanded the castle walls to extend around the village.

Under the reign of King Afonso V (1438-1481), the sovereign dispensation granted to residents of manning the Castle Hill Miranda (1449). His son and successor, King John II (1481-1495), determined to rebuild its defenses in the corregimiento of the strengths of Trall Montes (1493).

The Fortification Hill is figured by Duarte de Armas (Book of Strengths, c. 1509), highlighting the complex formed by the Watchtower rectangular, attached to a stronghold. King Manuel I (1495-1521) granted it a charter, and the town was transferred from the hill to the valley. Data from this phase the epoch of progressive abandonment and ruin of the medieval castle.

The Fortification Hill is recorded in the encyclopedia Duarte de Armas (Book of Strengths, c. 1509), highlighting the complex formed by the Watchtower rectangular that is attached to a stronghold. King Manuel I (1495-1521) granted it a charter, and the town was transferred from the hill to the valley. Data from this phase the epoch of progressive abandonment and ruin of the medieval castle.

=== Towards modern day ===
During the Portuguese War of Restoration, the castle was assaulted by Spanish troops. The same thing happened in 1762, although both times were unsuccessful.

The castle was designated a Public Interest Property on 20 October 1955, rather late compared to other castles. In 1993, more improvement and reconstruction works were done by action of the Directorate General for National Buildings and Monuments (DGEMN) in 1993.

== Characteristics ==
The castle sits 812 meters above sea level. The floor plan has an irregular oval plant. The castle is supported by thick walls composed of stone granite, which is abundant in the region.

Access was made through a door in full arch.

On the south side, there are remains of a crumbling bulwark.
