= Castle of Miranda do Douro =

Medieval castle in Miranda do Douro, Coimbra, Portugal

- Castielho de Miranda de l Douro (Mirandese) Castelo de Miranda do Douro (Portuguese)
- Bragança, Trás-os-Montes e Alto Douro, Norte; Near Miranda do Douro/Miranda de l Douro in Portugal
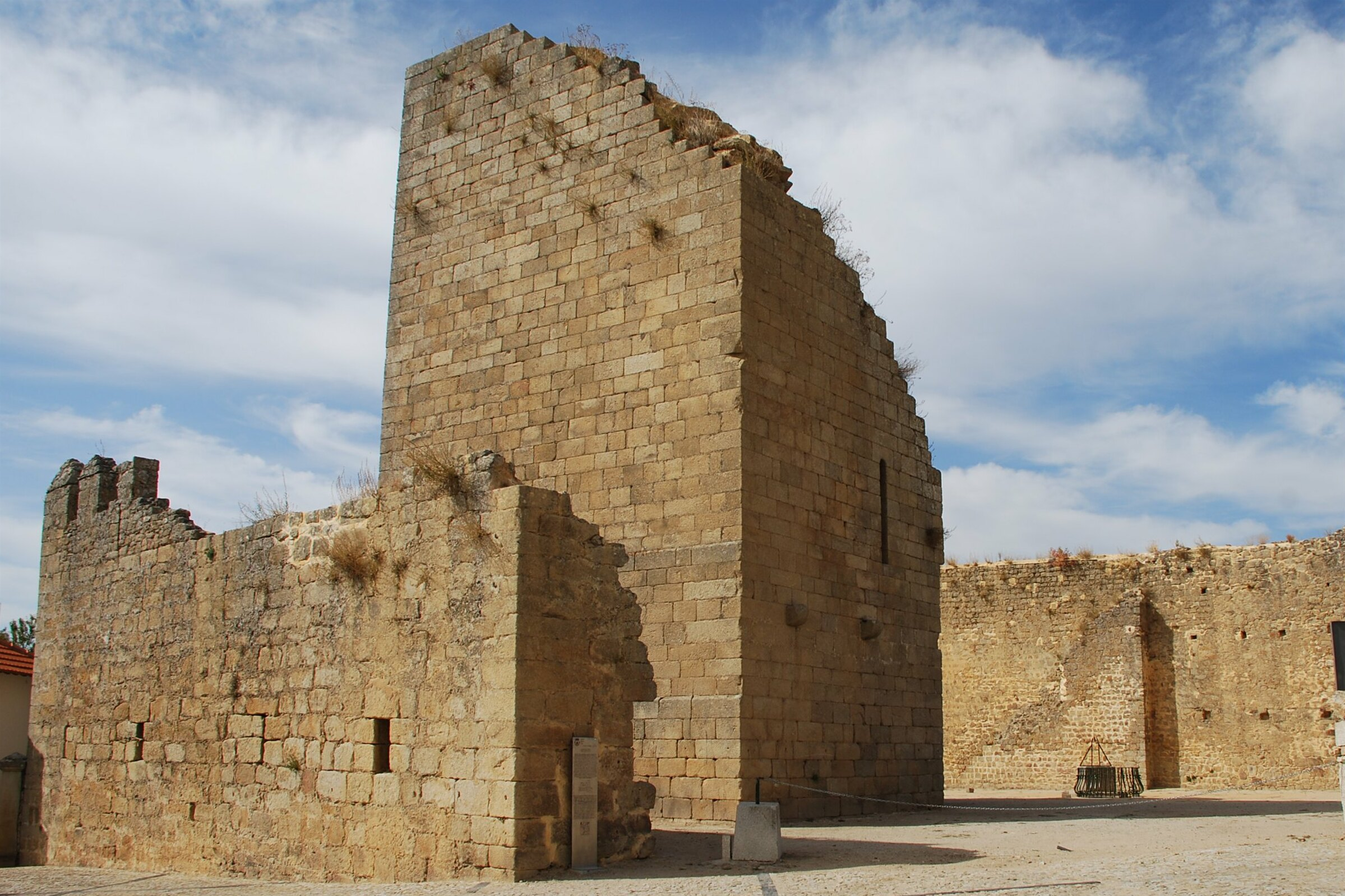
- A view of the barbican and iconic keep tower of the Castle of Miranda do Douro

Site information
- Type: Castle
- Owner: Portuguese Republic
- Operator: DRCNorte (Dispatch 829/2009, Diário da República, Série 2, 163, 24 August 2009)
- Open to the public: Public

Site history
- Built: 8th century
- Materials: Granite, Schist, Mortar (masonry)

The Castle of Miranda do Douro (Portuguese: Castelo de Miranda do Douro, Mirandese: Castielho de Miranda de l Douro) is a Portuguese medieval castle in the civil parish of Miranda do Douro, in the municipality of the same name, in the district of Bragança.

== History ==
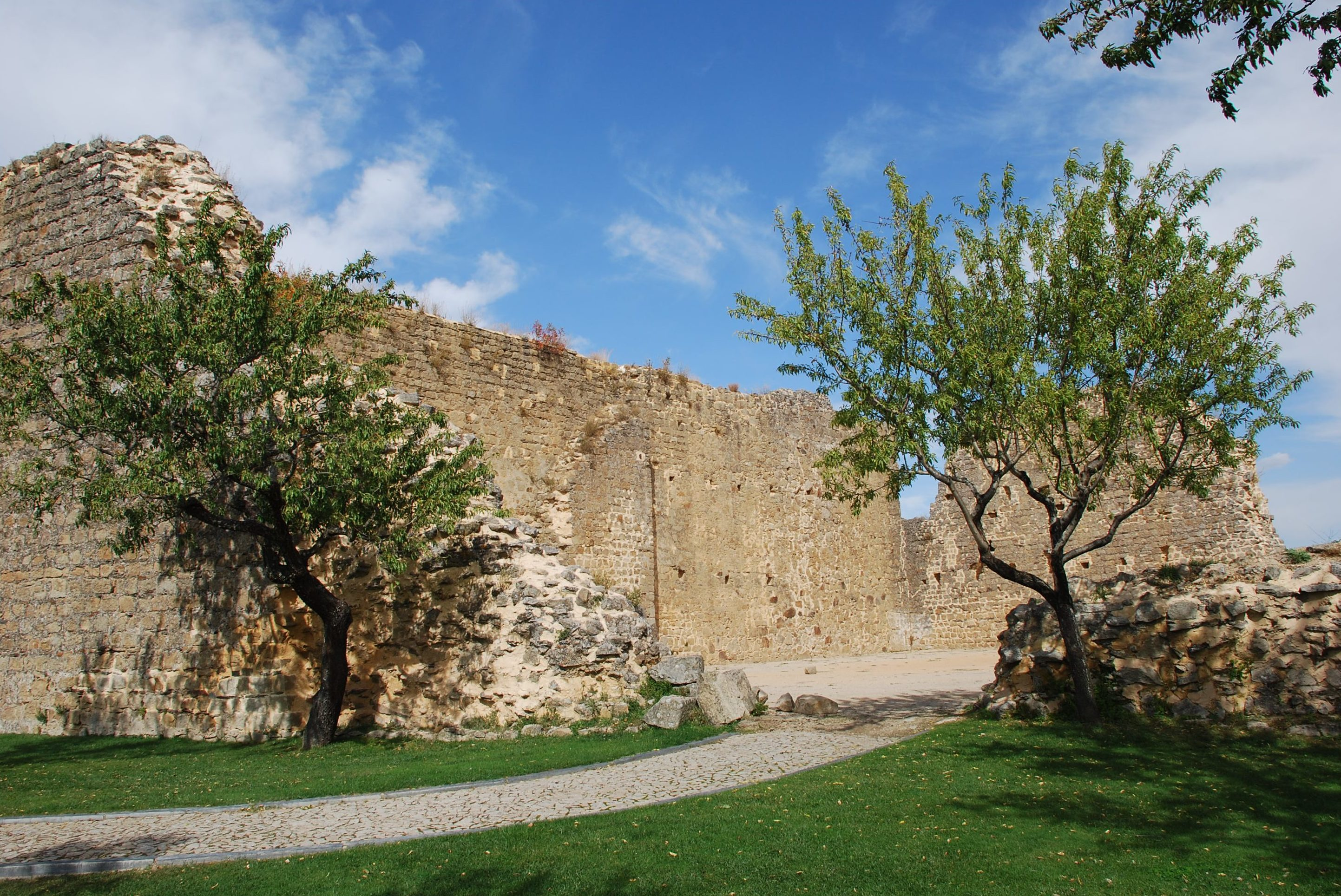
The manicured greens alongside the fortification walls

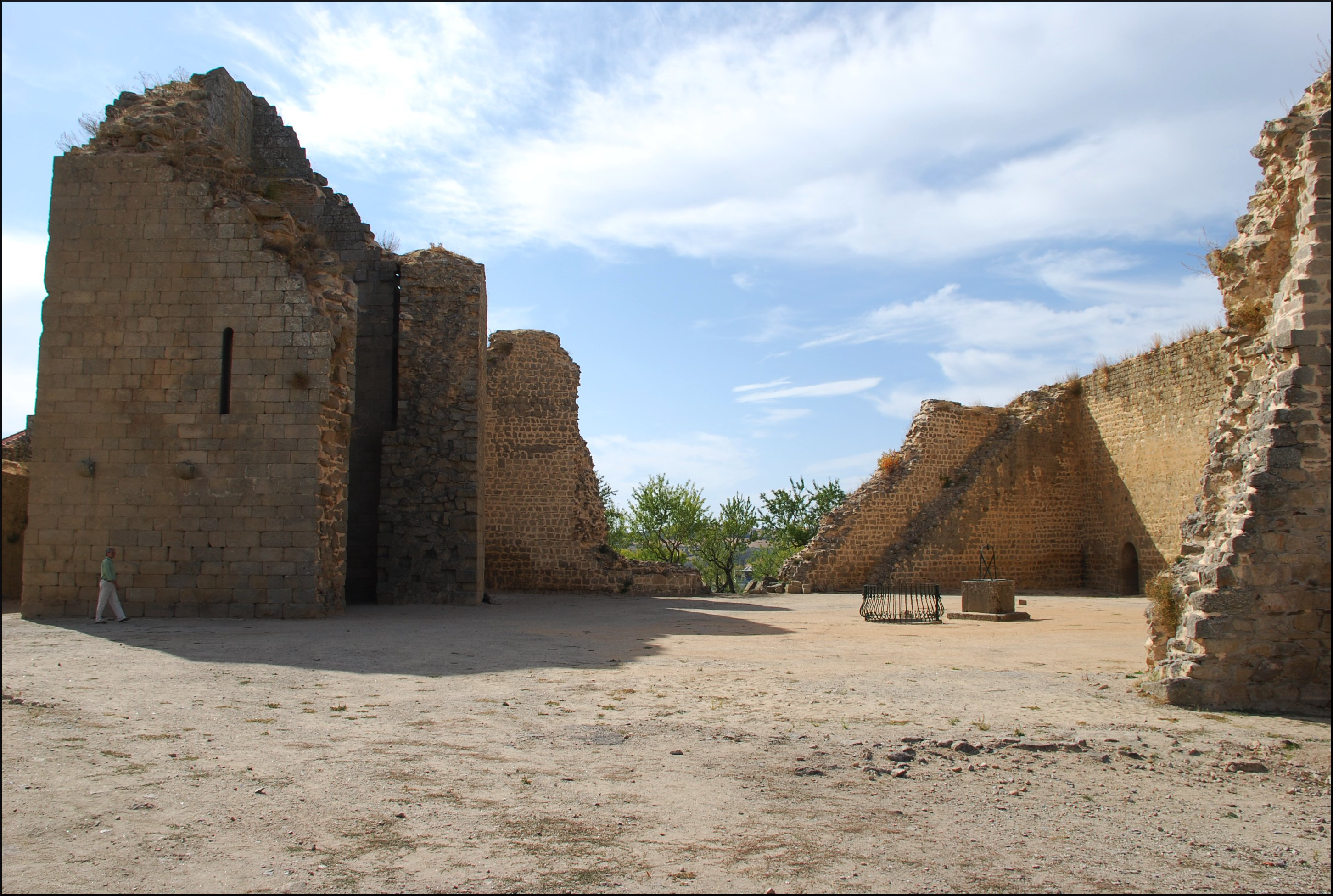
Interior spaces of the castle and barbican

The town originated in Celt settlement and survived during the Roman occupation of the Iberian Peninsula, and systematically influenced by cultural shifts initiated by the Suebi, Visigoths and the Moors by 8th and 9th centuries. The settlement was definitively conquered from the Moors in 857, by forces loyal to Count Henry.

By 1093, the western limits of Galicia included portions of Miranda, that included the Douro River, falling under the dominion of the county of Portucale and successively ruled by Count Henry, his widow, the Countess Teresa, and their son, Afonso Henriques. In 1136, Afonso Henriques conceded a Foral (charter) to Miranda and converted the site into a military outpost, even as a fortification already existed at the site. During this period the town was already defended by a castle, left in ruins by the struggles of Reconquista.

Following the campaigns to take Galicia, in 1135, Afonso Henriques was encouraged to restore castles, monasteries and churches in strategic places along the Miranda do Douro. Aiming to build up the settlement and defense in their time of peace, the village received tenure in 1136, coming to be in place Couto and safe haven. The town grew around the castle, by the end of the reign of Henriques. In the following years, successive monarchs re-issued the forals, that included the 1217, re-issue by D. Afonso II and, the 1286, renewal by King D. Dinis, who issued orders to proceeded with work on the site. Then between 1294 and 1299, King D. Denis ordered the reconstruction of the castle. The struggles between D. Sancho I and his son/successor, Afonso II, along with support from Alfonso IX of León, resulted in the lands Miranda being occupied by Leonese forces who, ultimately, returned the castle to Portugal, in 1213.

In 1325, the settlement was elevated to the status of "town".

Miranda was returned to Portugal in 1371, following the Treaty of Évora. After its return, in 1383, the fortification walls and military square improved under the direction of Pedro Homem de Távora.

In 1400, the Master of Alcântara encircled the square, but eight years later, it was converted into a sanctuary town.

On 28 June 1449, the Castle of Bragança, along with the town, the castle of Outeiro and Miranda, in addition to other lands, were donated by D. Afonso V to the Duke of Bragança.

Duarte de Armas, illustrated the state of the castle in his 16th century Book of Fortresses, identifying an irregular, rectangular plan, adapted to the terrain, comprising a castle and walls that enveloped the settlement and barbican. The rectangular keep tower, along with four other polygonal towers, and a military square with a central pool, that provided potable water. The gates were protected by lateral towers.

In 1510, D. Manuel I re-issued a new foral. Thirty years later, a papal bull Pro Excellente Apostolicae transformed the town into a diocesan centre.

Peace with the Spaniards brought great prosperity to the town, which became one of the most important centers of trade between the two countries. Miranda do Douro became its own diocese and was elevated to city status through a royal letter dated 10 July 1545 (issued by D. John III). This first episcopal period, lasting from the mid-16th century to the mid-18th century, had Mirando enjoying a renaissance era as the capital of Tras-os-Montes Province, the only diocese in the province and an important military center. Yet, subsequent military events began its slow decline, which was accentuated by the permanent loss of its episcopal distinction.

Following the Restoration Wars, in 1664, King D. John IV ordered the reconstruction of the castle, with work initiated to prepare the site for its use by artillery. But, in 1710, the castle fell into the hands of the Castilians.

Following its return, in 1746, work on the castle continued under the direction of Luís Xavier Bernardo. But, in 1762, there was an explosion in the powder magazine, that resulted in the obliteration of 22,500 kilograms (49,600 lb) of munition, destroying a great part of the citadel, the destruction of the square within the next three months.

On 28 December 1804, information that the Province of Trás-os-Montes lacked a military square, fort or fortress or artillery, owing to the Spanish invasion in 1762, that resulted in the destruction of the military squares of Chaves, Bragança and Miranda (as well as a few castles). A circular issued by the Ministry of War, dated 23 September 1861, referred to the situation of these fortifications in the Province. In response, on 5 October, the military division affirmed the lack of squares, forts or castles, and that the work planned was left in a state of abandon, and indicated the site's absolute lack of utility. In case of war, a resistance was possible, with the assistance of the Fort of São Neutel and fragments from the walls of Chaves and Miranda do Douro.

On 1 June 1992, the property was placed into the management of the Instituto Português do Património Arquitetónico (Portuguese Institute of Architectural Patrimony), by Decree 106F/92 (Diário da República, Série 1A, 126).

== Architecture ==
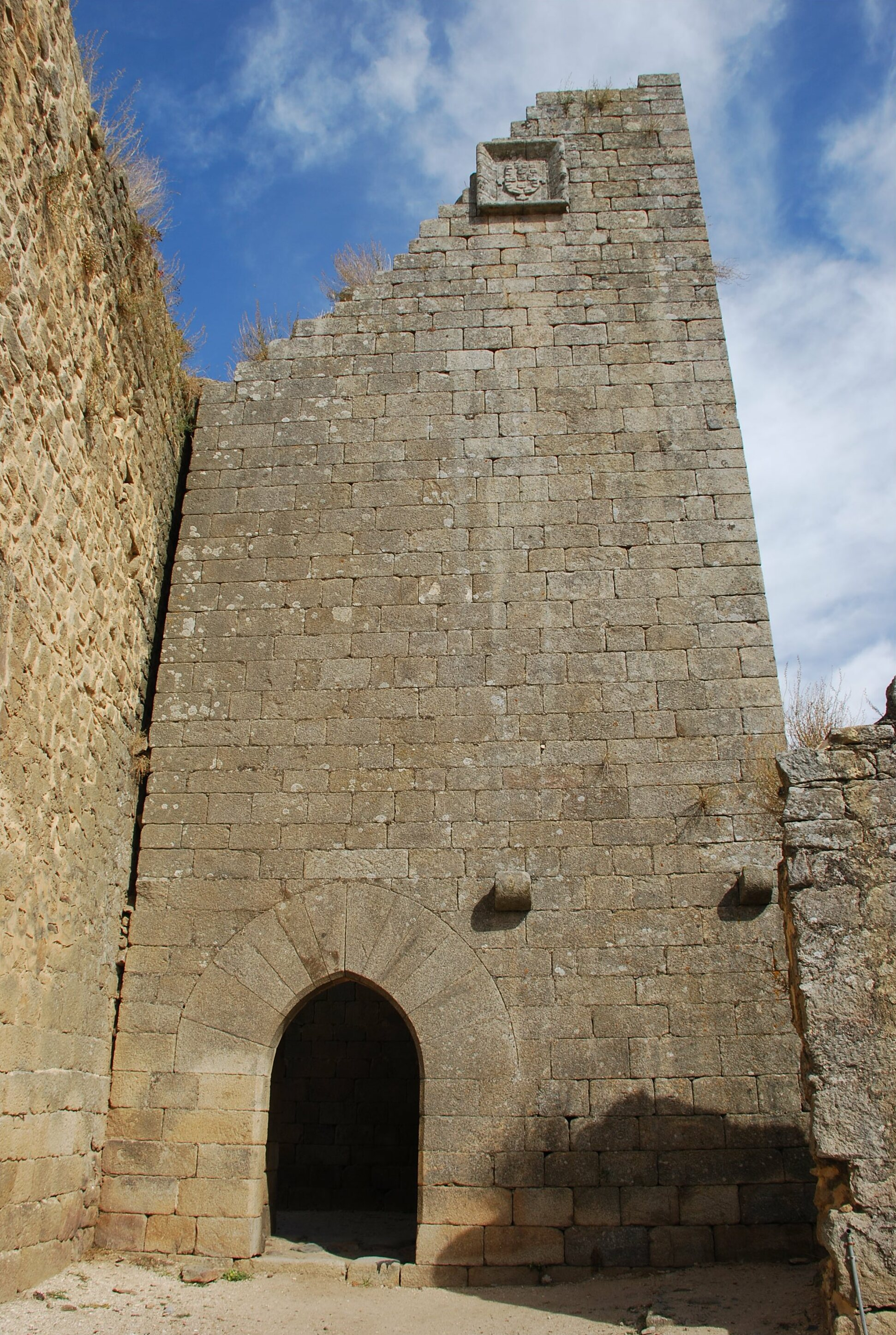
One of the Gothic-inspired tower gates

The castle is located in an urban context, surrounded by buildings, roadways and avenues from recent history, that demarcate the intermural nucleus, of the medieval burg, comprising small houses, the castle (to north) and the cathedral (south).

The castle, survived by extensive lines of walls, that encircle the old city (complemented by a circular roadway). The walls are broken by individual gates: the Gate of Senhora do Amparo, the False Gate and the Postigo Gate, one of which is protected by machicolations. The first included a pointed arch, set in imposing protrusions, framed by a stave, and protected by two squares and a perfect back arch with a frame, where a painting of the Lady of Amparo appears. In the walls, several locks are torn and there are two access stairs to a round path, embedded in the faces of the walls. The castle includes courtyard, a primitive military square, and a cistern with access by stairs, obstructed and protected by metallic railing.

The town has an octagonal layout, with its main axis along the Largo de D. João III, Rua da Costanilha and crossed by Rua do Abade de Baçal. In southern corner is the Cathedral of Miranda do Douro and episcopal palace. Opposite it, at about 682 metres (2,238 ft) altitude, is the keep tower, with one of the facades destroyed. Some of the masonry is missing, leaving open gaps (with exposed material), and walls of 2 metres (6.6 ft) thick.
