= Mogadouro, Valverde, Vale de Porco e Vilar de Rei =

- Civil parish
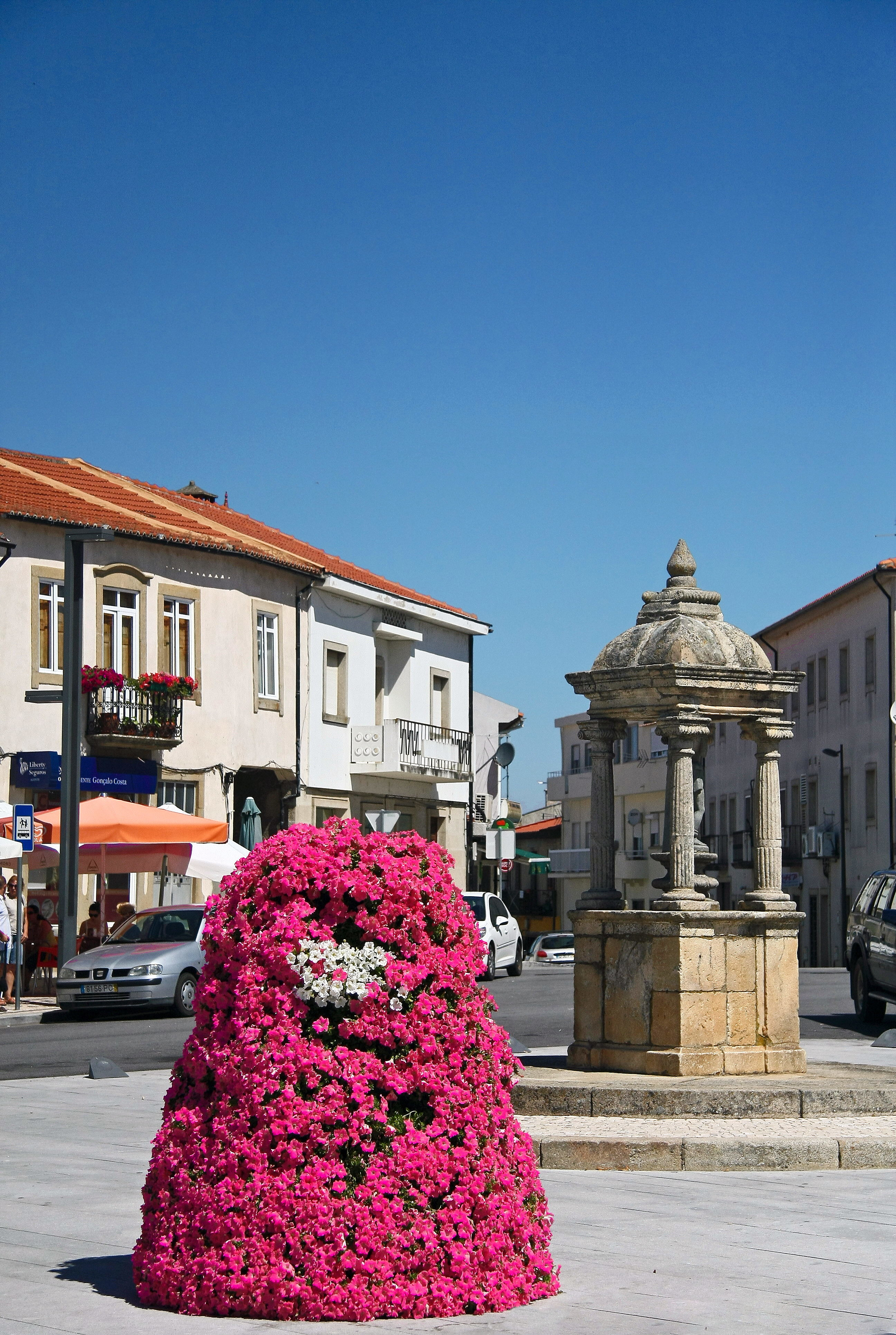

- Location in Portugal
- Coordinates: 41.339°N 6.709°W
- Country: Portugal
- Region: Norte
- Intermunic. comm.: Terras de Trás-os-Montes
- District: Bragança
- Municipality: Mogadouro

Area
  - Total: 103.22 km^{2} (39.85 sq mi)

Population (2011)
  - Total: 3,887
  - Density: 37.66/km^{2} (97.53/sq mi)
- Time zone: UTC+00:00 (WET)
  - Summer (DST): UTC+01:00 (WEST)

Mogadouro, Valverde, Vale de Porco e Vilar de Rei is a civil parish in the municipality of Mogadouro, Portugal. It was formed in 2013 by the merger of the former parishes Mogadouro, Valverde, Vale de Porco and Vilar de Rei. The population in 2011 was 3,887, in an area of 103.22 km².
