= Mogadouro =

- Municipality
- Town of Mogadouro
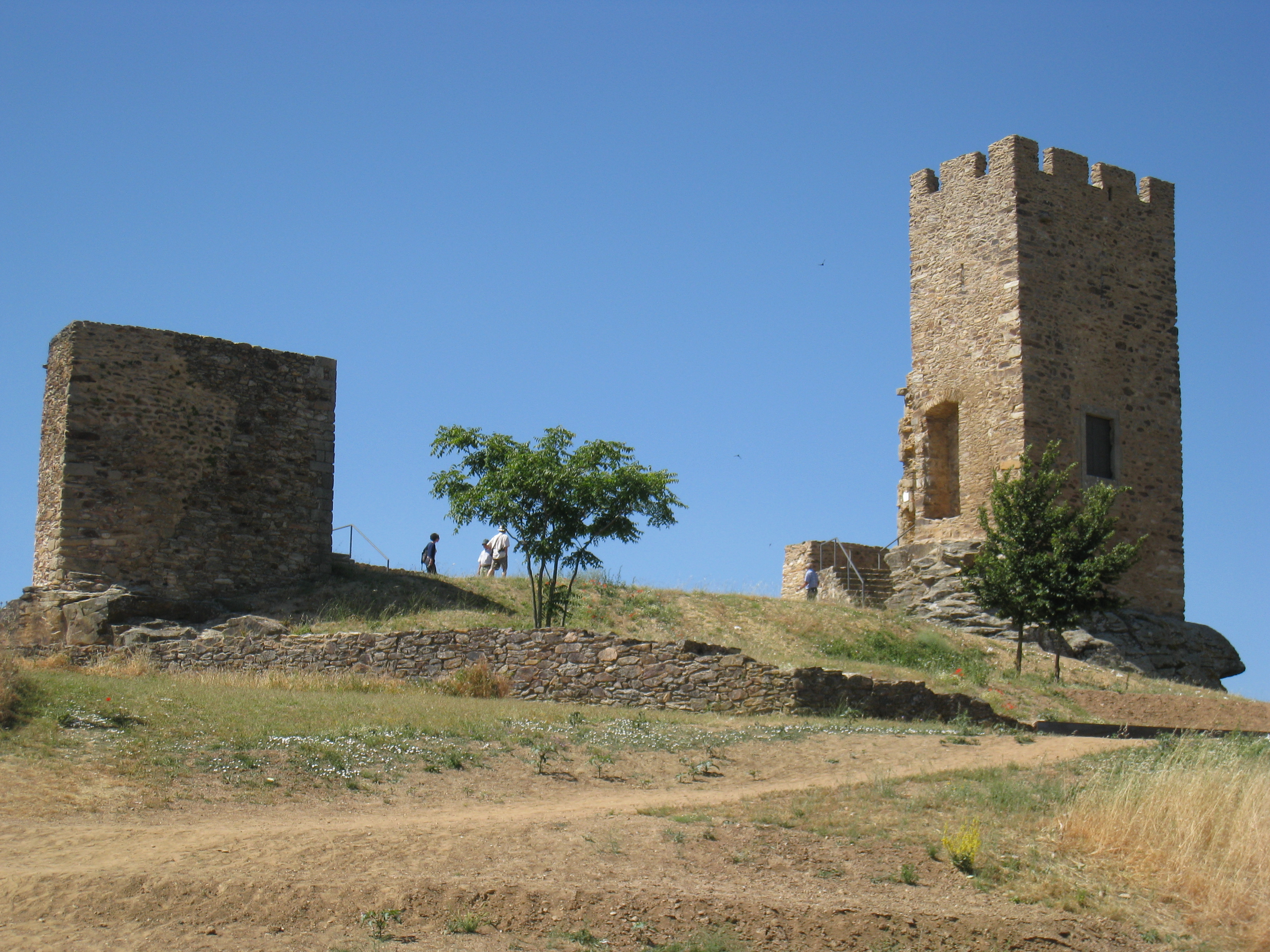
- View of Mogadouro

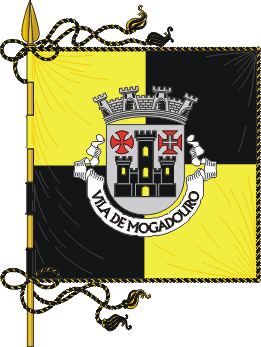
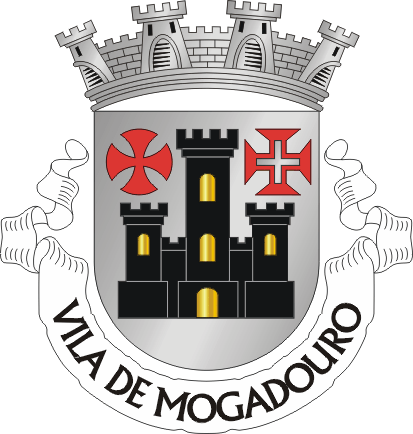
- Flag Coat of arms
- Interactive map of Mogadouro
- Location in Portugal
- Coordinates: 41°20′25″N 6°42′58″W
- Country: Portugal
- Region: Norte
- Intermunic. comm.: Terras de Trás-os-Montes
- District: Bragança
- Seat: Mogadouro Municipal Chamber
- Parishes: 21

Government
  - President: António G. S. Moraes Machado (PPD-PSD)

Area
  - Total: 760.65 km^{2} (293.69 sq mi)
- Elevation: 790 m (2,590 ft)
- Highest elevation: 996 m (3,268 ft)

Population (2011)
  - Total: 9,542
  - Density: 12.54/km^{2} (32.49/sq mi)
- Time zone: UTC+00:00 (WET)
  - Summer (DST): UTC+01:00 (WEST)
- Postal code: 5200
- Area code: 279
- Patron: São Mamede
- Website: www.mogadouro.pt

Mogadouro (European Portuguese: [muɣɐˈðo(w)ɾu], Mirandese: [mʊɣaˈðowɾʊ]), officially the City of Mogadouro (Portuguese: Cidade de Mogadouro; Mirandese: Bila de Mogadouro), is a municipality in Portugal, most of which lies in the Tierra de Miranda. The population in 2011 was 9,542, in an area of 760.65 km^{2}.

== History ==
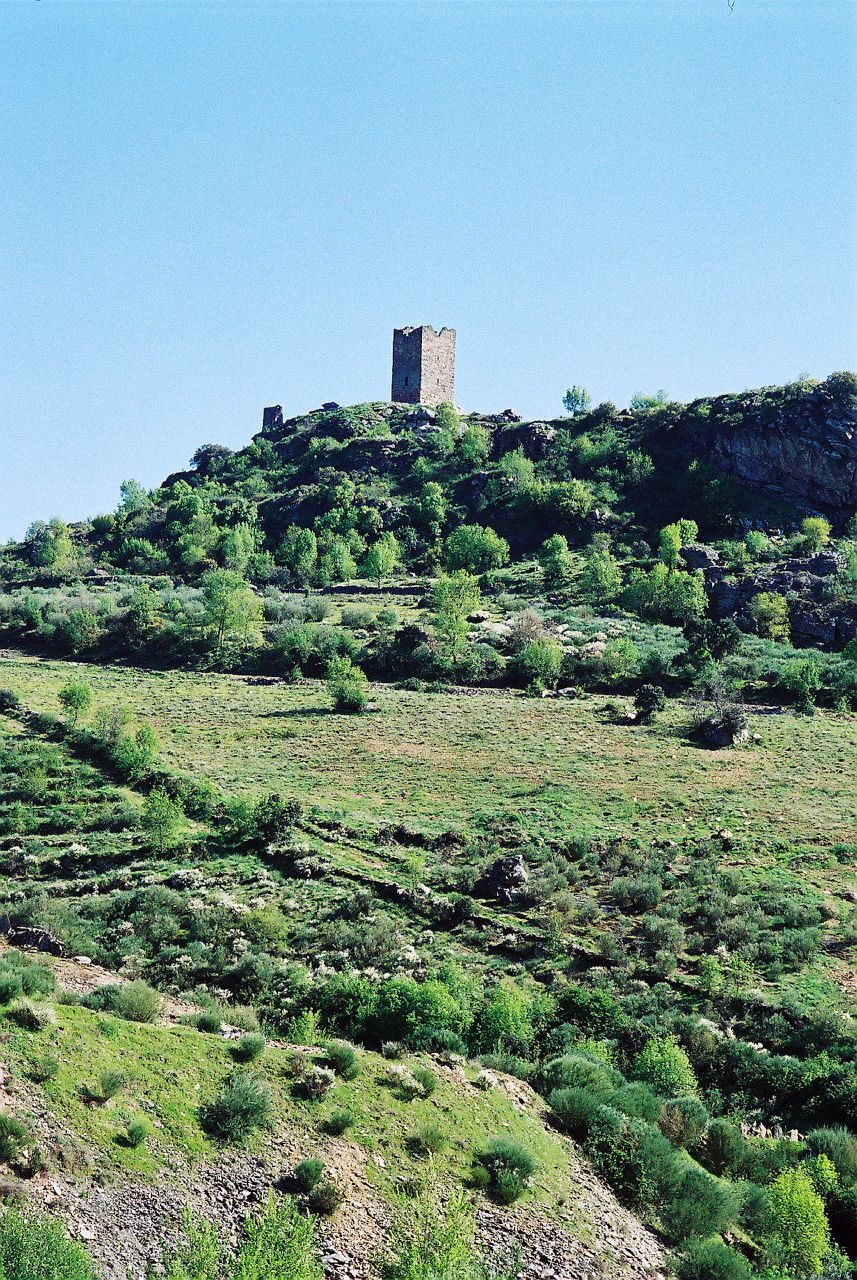
Built through the initiative of the templar knight Gualdim Pais

The history of Mogadouro is evident in the number of castros that dot the landscape of region from the Neolithic period. In particular are the castros of Oleiros in Bemposta, Vilarinho, São Martinho do Peso, Figueirinha de Travanca, Bruçó and the more recently excavated castro in Vilariça, in the Serra da Castanheira.

The Celts passed through this region, leaving behind its art and religion, the so-called Cultura aos Berrões. One of these Celtic tribes, the Zoelae, were responsible for settling many of the lands along the Douro, Sabor and Angueira Rivers.

During the Roman period, the region is referred to in art, religion and socio-economic reports, indicating its regional importance. The Ara Romana to Deus Jupiter Depulsori (which still survives to this day in Saldanha), is one of these remnants of this period (it was constructed during the reign of Septimius Severus in the 3rd century AD). Throughout the municipality area have been discovered many funerary stones and artefacts that attest the Romanization of these lands.

Vestiges of the Visigothic era are rare, but include a paleo-Christian inscription that was discovered in São Martinho do Peso (now in the Abade de Baçal Museum in Bragança.

Moorish influence in this region is limited to local handicrafts made from flax and wool, that includes the hand embroidery, quilts, rugs and towels. During the Reconquista era, it is known that Alfonso III of León effected many construction projects during his reign, that were more strategic then political: organizing a military line along the Douro with castles (to protect the holdings of the León while inducing incursions into Moorish lands, populating conquered territory and taking advantage of natural geography to defend his territory. After fortifying Zamora, around 893, he ordered the construction of castles along the line, repopulating them as he progressed. Toro and Simancas developed consequently from this policy. It is likely that the area of Mogadouro was settled as a strategic point along the line, resulting in the construction of the first fort. The regions name evolved from this settlement: Mógo means a implanted marker, considered a symbolic delineation of the separation or division of a territory, a term imported from common language at the time. The mógo do Douro (mark on the Douro), or Mogadouro, developed from this locational designation.

The Castle of Penas Róias was constructed during the nation-building of Afonso Henriques. The stone of the cell-block tower is inscribed with a medieval statement: "Começaram os fundamentos do Castelo chamadao Pena Roia na era de 1204 sendo Mestre Geral dos Templários Gualdim Pais" [They began the fundamentals of the Castle Pena Roia in the era of 1204 by Master General of the Templar Gualdim Pais]. The later Castle of Modagouro, from the same decade, was started prior to the establishment of the civic charter (foral) in 1272/73. During the Portuguese dynastic crisis (or Interregnum) the noble classes supported the King of Castile, resulting in an eventual reprisal by Prince John (who elevated the hamlet of Azinhoso and parsed it from Mogadouro). Consequently, although its economic activity did not contract, the lack of royal patronage meant that Mogadouro remained stagnated until the 16th century.

Mogadouro, historically, fell within the Caminhos de Santiago, a capillary of secondary roadways that extended throughout the Trás-os-Montes region leading pilgrims down Saint James Way. The principal road arrived in Mogadouro from Castelo Rodrigo, from two routes: from Freixo de Espada à Cinta (Castelo Rodrigo, Figueira de Castelo Rodrigo, Escalhão, crossing the Douro by boat in Barca de Alva, Quinta de Santiago, Freixo de Espada à Cinta, Mós, Fornos, Lagoaça, Bruçó, Mogadouro); the other from Moncorvo (Castelo Rodrigo, Figueira de Castelo Rodrigo, Almendra, Castelo Melhor, Vila Nova de Foz Côa, crossing the Douro by boat in Pocinho, Moncorvo, Vilariça, Adeganha, Parada, here crossing the Sabor in Santo Antão da Barca before reaching Mogadouro). The Caminho de Santiago forked in Mogadouro at the Chapel of Nossa Senhora do Caminho (Caminho de Santigao): to Azinhoso (an enormous enclosure existed near the Church of Azinhoso to provide shelter during the crossing), then over a medieval bridge that connected Penas Roias, Algoso, Vimioso to Bragança; the other road departed from the Church of Nossa Senhora do Caminho, to Santiago, then Algosinho (to another pilgrimage church), Ventoselo (where there still remains vestiges of the pilgrimages, such as the roof painting in the Chapel of Nossa Senhor da Boa Morte), on the way passing by a spring (where pilgrimages would satisfy their thirst), to another chapel to Santigao (now completely destroyed), Urrós, Sendim, and Miranda do Douro). There were several tributaries, shortcuts and dirt tracks on the pilgrim roadways, such as: through Azinhoso (where the faithful would rest in the chapel to São Gonçalo, a patron saint of the travellers); through Variz, Castanheira, Valcerto, Algoso, Campo de Víboras and Vimioso; through Santiago (now Vila de Ala), an important crossroads between Peredo de Bemposta (through Algosinho, Ventoselo and Vila de Ala) and Bemposta (through Lamoso, Tó and Vila de Ala). Those who travelled from the southern part of the district would likely stop in Zava (where a chapel to São Cristóvão, the saint protector, was located).

It was after the 16th century that Mogadouro saw some growth. The Távora family, a noble house with influence and power in court, controlled the region, commanding the fort and guiding the town, generally contributing to the development of the lands within their domain. It was through the action of the Távoras that the local Santa Casa da Misericórdia was founded in 1559, and its local church. The bridges between Valverde and Meirinhos (in 1677), and the Remondes bridge, between Mogadouro and Macedo de Cavaleiros (in 1678) were also constructed with the patronage of the Távoras. In addition, the family supported the constructions of a few churches and altars in various municipalities throughout the 17th–18th century, including the Convent of São Francisco, the Matriz Church of Mogadouro, the Chapel of Nossa Senhora da Ascensão, in the heights of Serra da Castanheira and many others. But, by act of King Joseph I the Távoras lands were confiscated by the Marquess of Pombal, and members of the family executed after an attempted-assassination of the monarch. The annihilation of the family resulted in the loss of development impetus.

The municipal archive, installed in the Convent of São Francisco (today the Mogadouro Municipal Chamber) burned down in 1881 (and again later in 1927).

After the extinction of the monastic orders, by the Liberal government, the Convent of São Francisco was appropriated to store public records and local administration.

By the 19th century, few of the noble families were interested in their holdings in Mogadouro, nor did they do much to develop these lands. By the end of the 20th century, only the poet-jurist José Francisco Trindade Coelho defended his land rights, and the region was abandoned by the central hierarchy of Lisbon.

The Sabor line, a narrow gauge railway, served the community via the Mogadouro railway station between 1930 and 1988.

== Geography ==
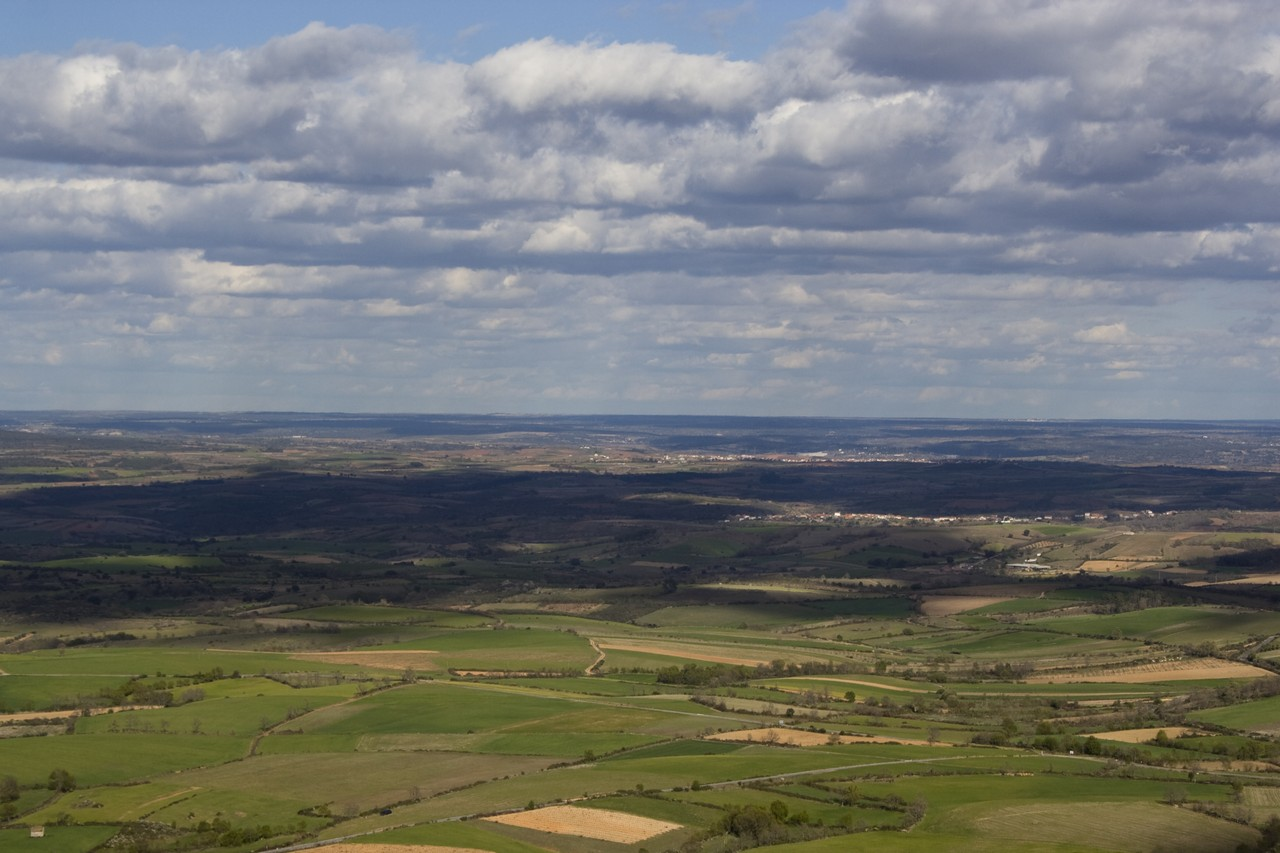
The Mirandês plateau region of Mogadouro, who to several species of hare, rabbit and partridge

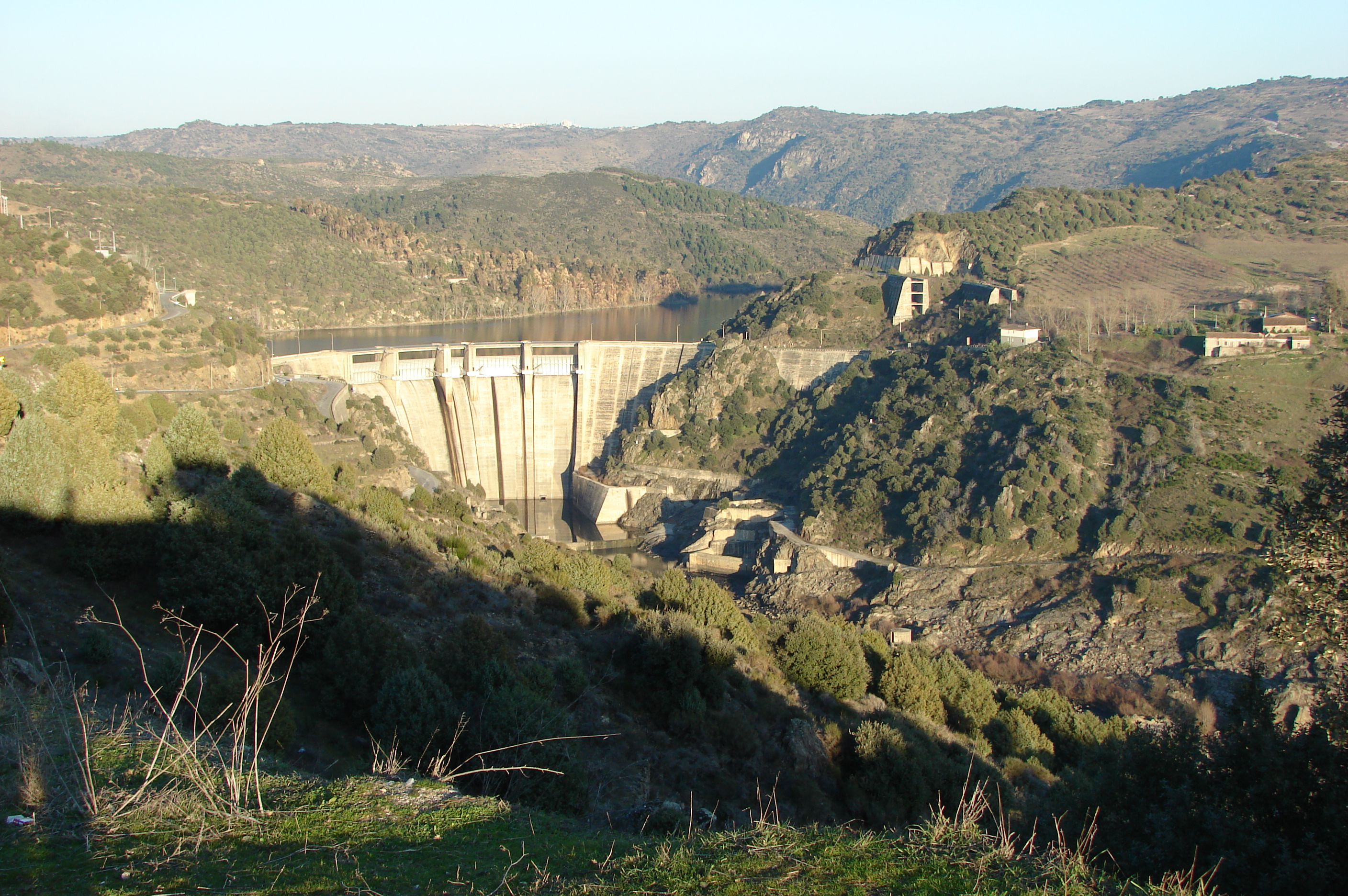
The Bemposta Dam in the heart of the Douro region of Mogadouro

=== Physical geography ===
The municipality of Mogadouro, situated in the Trás-os-Montes region of northeastern Portugal, in the traditional district of Bragança. It is boxed by the northeastern municipalities of Vimioso, Macedo de Cavaleiros, Alfândega da Fé, Torre de Moncorvo and Freixo de Espada à Cinta. It is separated from the Spanish province of Castilla y León, by the river-valley of the Douro River, whose margins are cut by v-shaped inclines. The territory of Mogadouro is naturally delimited by environment of the Rivers Douro and Sabor. A great part of the territory of the Mogadouro belongs to the Mirandês Plateau (which is an extension of the Iberian Meseta), lands rich fertile fields responsible for the cultivation of cereals (such as wheat, oats, and rye), supporting cattle and sheep herds (including the Mirandese and Terra Quente breeds). Two sheltered valleys, with micro-climates, support vineyards, olive, orange and almond orchards, as well as other Mediterranean products.

The area around the Douro is a zone of granite escarpments of large blocks, resulting in a relief that is shaped by schists interrupted by quartz rocks that form the mountains. In the southern part of this area, dominated by the Sabor basin, there are different layers of schists. The soils, and climatic characteristics, have resulted in a diversified coverage that change throughout the year. Average median altitudes reach 700 metres, above sea level, although there are exceptions, as is the case with the Cimos de Mogadouro (usually around 900 m).

==== Ecoregions/Protected areas ====
Mogadouro is also the seat for the Parque Natural do Douro Internacional (International Douro Natural Park), a protected wilderness that includes primarily the slopes of the Douro valley, but also lands designated as bird sanctuaries for species of eagle (specifically the Bonelli and golden eagles), the griffon and Egyptian vultures, and the rare black stork, in addition to the red-billed chough, the alpine swift and the black wheatear.

During the months of April and May, the flowering trees highlight the landscapes of many of the parishes. Mountain perennials (such as rosemary, Cytisus striatus and heather) are also common, although the Fagaceae (a species of beech) and holly oak, cork oak and juniper (which grow along the slopes of the Douro and Sabor valleys) are the predominant species.

=== Climate ===
Located in the southern part of the Mirandês Plateau, the region is influenced by three climatic systems: the Atlantic, the Continent and the Mediterranean. As a result, its agriculture is varied and its landscape is full of contrasts. In the winter, the climate is rigorously cold and icy, with snowfall common throughout the period. In the summer, it is susceptible to torrid heat, typical of continental climates, that supports a dry vegetation.

Climate data for Mogadouro (1991–2020)
Month	Jan	Feb	Mar	Apr	May	Jun	Jul	Aug	Sep	Oct	Nov	Dec	Year
Record high °C (°F)	17.6 (63.7)	20.1 (68.2)	24.4 (75.9)	28.5 (83.3)	33.7 (92.7)	40.9 (105.6)	40.6 (105.1)	39.9 (103.8)	39.8 (103.6)	31.4 (88.5)	21.7 (71.1)	15.6 (60.1)	40.9 (105.6)
Mean daily maximum °C (°F)	8.2 (46.8)	10.7 (51.3)	14.2 (57.6)	16.4 (61.5)	20.9 (69.6)	26.4 (79.5)	30.1 (86.2)	29.7 (85.5)	24.9 (76.8)	18.2 (64.8)	12.0 (53.6)	8.8 (47.8)	18.4 (65.1)
Daily mean °C (°F)	5.1 (41.2)	6.6 (43.9)	9.4 (48.9)	11.4 (52.5)	15.1 (59.2)	19.6 (67.3)	22.6 (72.7)	22.5 (72.5)	18.9 (66.0)	13.9 (57.0)	8.7 (47.7)	5.8 (42.4)	13.3 (55.9)
Mean daily minimum °C (°F)	1.9 (35.4)	2.6 (36.7)	4.6 (40.3)	6.3 (43.3)	9.3 (48.7)	12.9 (55.2)	15.1 (59.2)	15.4 (59.7)	12.9 (55.2)	9.7 (49.5)	5.4 (41.7)	2.8 (37.0)	8.3 (46.9)
Record low °C (°F)	−6.0 (21.2)	−6.1 (21.0)	−7.4 (18.7)	−1.2 (29.8)	0.6 (33.1)	4.9 (40.8)	7.3 (45.1)	8.0 (46.4)	4.9 (40.8)	0.0 (32.0)	−3.0 (26.6)	−6.1 (21.0)	−7.4 (18.7)
Average precipitation mm (inches)	75.3 (2.96)	46.0 (1.81)	56.5 (2.22)	65.7 (2.59)	57.5 (2.26)	23.3 (0.92)	14.4 (0.57)	16.7 (0.66)	42.2 (1.66)	92.8 (3.65)	83.3 (3.28)	77.2 (3.04)	651.0 (25.63)
Average precipitation days (≥ 1 mm)	9.4	6.9	7.7	9.6	8.3	4.1	2.0	2.3	4.8	9.5	9.4	8.7	82.7
Source: Instituto Português do Mar e da Atmosfera

=== Human geography ===
The municipality of Mogadouro has, over the last decades, suffered an enormous depopulation, resulting in the concentration into the urbanized areas, and emigration to the coastal communities of Portugal. Like many of the Transmontana communities, Mogadouran hamlets built on traditional homes adapted to the climate of the region, built of granite or schist material, with verandas or balconies used to dry clothing, hang/dry onions and pumpkins/squash, or generalling conserve foodstuffs. The modernization of these traditional communities has ironically resulted in the destruction of Transmontan patrimony.

Population of Mogadouro (1801–2011)
Year	Pop.	±%
1801	6,193	—
1849	10,607	+71.3%
1900	17,558	+65.5%
1930	16,739	−4.7%
1960	19,571	+16.9%
1981	15,340	−21.6%
1991	12,188	−20.5%
2001	11,235	−7.8%
2011	9,542	−15.1%

Administratively, the municipality is divided into 21 civil parishes (freguesias):

- Azinhoso
- Bemposta
- Bruçó
- Brunhoso
- Brunhozinho, Castanheira e Sanhoane
- Castelo Branco
- Castro Vicente
- Meirinhos
- Mogadouro, Valverde, Vale de Porco e Vilar de Rei
- Paradela
- Penas Róias
- Peredo da Bemposta
- Remondes e Soutelo
- Saldanha
- São Martinho do Peso
- Tó
- Travanca
- Urrós
- Vale da Madre
- Vila de Ala
- Vilarinho dos Galegos e Ventozelo

== Economy ==
Mogadouro is essentially a rural area, supported by agriculture and animal by-products. In addition to the primary sector, Mogadouro supports a diverse industrial sector, with warehouses, shops and industries linked to agriculture.

Along the Mirandês Plateau, cereal crops (in particular wheat) and forage allows the support of a large dairy industry. Mogadouro is one of the most productive milk suppliers in the north. Mogadouro is also a land known for almond production. Principally, in the fields of Valverde, Meirinhos, São Pedro, Souto, Roca, Santo André and São Martinho do Peso, these lands are covered in flowering trees seasonally, used in harvesting of the legumes.

In other periods, the horse culture was important in this region, not just in agriculture and transport, but also as a centre of equestrian training and breeding; the Quinta de Nogueira was well known as the second most important estate for the breeding and raising of horses, after the Quinta de Alter do Chão. During the stewardship of the Távoras (between the 15th and 18th century), the Quinta de Nogueira and Quinta Nova (which were contiguous) were an economic pole of the family.

Hunting is another important part of the local economy: in forested areas wild boar is typical; in short brush biomes, partridge and hare; and in the gardens and vegetable fields, rabbit is typical. This is an important economic benefit, not only attracting tourists, but hunting parties to the restaurants and residences in the region annually. During hunting season, many of the local hunting "lodges" are occupied with hunters and their associations, who travel into the region specifically for these species.

== Culture ==
=== Tradition ===
Local artisanship is also strong. The Associação Cultural e Recreativa de Soutelo (in Soutelo)) has promoted much of the traditional products of wool and cotton, including quilts, towels, embroidery, sericulture, metal-smithing, basket-weaving, rural miniatures. A local artisan has also produced artefacts in clay, reproducing faithfully the traditional techniques employed in Mogadouro and Nordeste Transmontanan.

The Nordeste Transmontanan gastronomy includes a variety of simple rural dishes, many of which include cured meats and sausages (presunto, alheira, bulhos (bone sausage), blood chouriço, linguiça, bochas, chabianos (sausage, flour, fat and semolina), vilões, tabafeias and salpicão), which are considered the kings of gastronomy in the region. On many plates there are the customary portion of the Mirandês veal (raised naturally in the pastures of the region and grilled over open flames), the marrã (pork, primarily bacon, grilled similarly), the sopa de xis (traditional made with blood), the cascas com bulho (dried green bean pods cooked with bulhos, bochas, fattened-pork meat and other embutidos), sopas das segadas (codfish and garlic soup), cabritinho serrano (baby goat), cordeiro churro assado na brasa (lamb grilled over flame), and greens. Local cheeses (goat and sheep), honey, económicos, roscos, matrafões, folar da Páscoa, rosinhas (a traditional sweet from Bruçó), formigos and tantas round out the peculiar digestive and aperitifs of the region.

Mogadouro is the central community, with a Preparatory (Portuguese: Escola Preparatória) and Secondary School (Portuguese: Escola Secundária) serving the large border frontier. Regional policies have allowed the advancement of local projects and initiatives and supported the active participation of its local citizens: there are 30 cultural and recreational associations coordinated by the Projecto Cultural initiative, based in Mogadouro.

== Notable citizens ==
- Luis de Carvajal y de la Cueva (ca. 1537 Mogadouro – 1591) governor of the Spanish province of Nuevo León, Mexico.
- Manuel Martins Manso (1793–1871) was a Portuguese bishop of Funchal and of Guarda.
- José Francisco Trindade Coelho (1861-1908) was a Portuguese writer and politician.
- Danny Roxo (1933–1976) was a Portuguese hunter, safari guide and soldier.
- Margarida Cordeiro (born 1939) a Portuguese psychiatrist and film director.

== See also ==
- Mogador
