= List of rivers of Portugal =

Rivers of Portugal

This is a list of the rivers of Portugal, including all the main stems and their tributaries.

Note: This list was taken from Lista de rios de Portugal in the Portuguese Wikipedia, with Rio x converted to x River.

== List ==
=== A ===
- Abadia le Riviera
- Agadão River
- Águeda River (Douro)
- Águeda River (Vouga)
- Albufeira River
- Alcabrichel River
- Alcantarilha River
- Alcoa River
- Alcobaça River
- Alcofra River
- Alfusqueiro River
- Algibre River
- Algoz River
- Alheda River
- Aljezur River
- Almançor River
- Almonda River
- Almorode River
- Alpiarça River, Ribeira de Ulme, Vala de Alpiarça, Alpiaçoilo River, Vala Real
- Alte River
- Alto River
- Alva River
- Alviela River
- Alvôco River
- Âncora River
- Anços River
- Angueira River
- Antuã River, Antuão River
- Arade River
- Arado River
- Arcão River
- Arcossó River
- Arda River
- Ardila River
- Arnóia River
- Arouce River
- Arunca River
- Asnes River
- Assureira River
- Ave River
- Avia River
- Azibo River

=== B ===
- Baça River
- Baceiro River
- Balsemão river
- Bazágueda River
- Beça River or Bessa River
- Bensafrim River
- Beselga River
- Bestança River or Ribeiro de São Martinho
- Boco River or Ribeira de Boco
- Boina River
- Botão River
- Branco River

=== C ===
- Caia River
- Caima River
- Cabral River
- Cabril River (Cávado)
- Cabril River (Corgo)
- Cabril River (Tâmega)
- Cabrum River
- Cachoeiras River
- Caldo River
- Calvo River
- Carapito River
- Carvalhosa River
- Cáster River
- Castro Laboreiro River
- Cávado River
- de Cavalos River
- Cavalum River
- Ceira River
- Cercal River
- Cértima River
- Chança River
- Côa River
- Cobrão River
- Cobres River
- Coina River
- Coja River
- de Colares River
- Corgo River
- Corvo River or Dueça River
- da Costa River
- Coura River
- Criz River
- Covelas River

=== D ===
- Dão River
- Degebe River
- Dinha River
- Divor River
- Douro River
- Drave River
- Diogo River

=== E ===
- Eirôgo River
- Erges River
- Espiche River
- Este River
- Ega River (Portugal)
- Eiriz River

=== F ===
- Falacho River
- Febros River
- Ferreira River
- Ferro River (Portugal)
- Fervença River
- Figueira River
- Fim River ???
- Fora River ???
- Frades River (Portugal)
- Fresno River (Portugal)
- Froufe River
- Lagoa Carvos

=== G ===
- Galinhas River
- Gerês River
- Gilão River
- Grande River (Lourinhã)
- Guadiana River

=== H ===
- Homem River

=== I ===
- Ínsua River
- Isna River
- Inha River

=== J ===
- Joanes River
- Jamor River or Ribeira do Jamor or Queluz River?
- Judeu River
- Juliano River

=== L ===
- Laboreiro River
- Labruja River
- Leça River
- Lena River (Portugal)
- Levira River
- Lima River
- Lis River
- Lizandro River or Lisandro River
- Lordelo River
- Braldu river

=== M ===
- Maçãs River
- Maior River
- Marnel River
- Massueime River
- Mau River
- Meão River
- de Mega River
- de Mel River
- Mente River
- Minho River
- Mira River
- Mondego River
- Mouro River

=== N ===
- Nabão River
- Negro River (Portugal) ???
- Neiva River
- Nisa River
- Noeime River

=== O ===
- Ocreza River or Ribeira, (afluente of Tejo River)
- Odeceixe River
- Odeleite River
- Odelouca River
- Odres River
- Olo River
- de Onor River
- Orelhão River
- Ovelha River
- Ovil River

=== P ===
- de Palhais River
- Paiva River
- Paivô River
- Peculhos River
- Pavia River
- Peio River
- Pêra River
- Pinhão River
- Poio River
- Pombeiro River
- Pônsul River
- Pranto River
- Pilas River

=== Q ===
- Quarteira River
- Queijais River

=== R ===
- Rabaçal River
- Rabagão River
- Raia River
- Ramalhoso River
- Real River (Portugal)

=== S ===
- Sabor River
- Sado River
- Safarujo River
- Salas River
- Saltadouro River
- Sardoura River
- Sátão River
- Seco River (Portugal)
- Selho River
- Sever River
- Silves River
- Sizandro River
- Sor River (Portugal)
- Sordo River (Portugal)
- Sorraia River
- Sótão River
- Soure River
- Sousa River
- Sul River

=== T ===
- Tábuas River
- Tagus
- Tâmega River
- Tanha River
- Távora River
- Tedinho River
- Tedo River
- Teixeira River (Douro)
- Teixeira River (Vouga)
- Tejo River (River Tagus)
- Terva River
- Tinhela River
- Tinhesa River
- Tornada River
- Torre River
- Torto River
- Torto River (Mira)
- Torto River (Portel)
- Tio Touro River
- Trancão River
- Tripeiro River
- Tua River
- Tuela River
- Temilobos River

=== U ===
- Uíma River
- Ul River
- Unhais River
- Urtigosa River

=== V ===
- Vade River
- Varosa River
- Vascão River
- Vez River
- de Vide River
- da Vila River
- Vizela River
- Vouga River

=== X ===
- Xarrama River
- Xévora River
- Portugal River

=== Z ===
- Zêzere River
- Zela River

== See also ==
- Geography of Europe
- List of European rivers with alternative names
- Latin names of European rivers
- European river zonation
- Relevant pages from Portuguese Wikipedia:
  - pt:Lista de rios de Portugal
  - pt:Lista de ribeiras de Portugal
