= Geography of Portugal =

Coordinates: 39°22′13.65″N 8°8′25.13″W

- Continent: Europe
- Region: Southern Europe; North Africa; Iberian Peninsula; Macaronesia
- Area: Ranked 109th
  - Total: 92,391 km^{2} (35,672 sq mi)
  - Land: 9%
  - Water: .45%
- Coastline: 1,794 km (1,115 mi)
- Borders: Total land borders: Portugal-Spain border (1214 km)
- Highest point: Mount Pico (Azores); 2,351 m (7,713 ft); Torre (Iberian Peninsula); 1,993 m (6,539 ft)
- Lowest point: Sea level (Atlantic Ocean)
- Longest river: Tagus (275 km within Portugal)
- Largest lake: Lake Alqueva
- Exclusive economic zone: 1,727,408 km^{2} (666,956 mi^{2})

Portugal is a coastal nation in western Europe, located at the western end of the Iberian Peninsula, bordering Spain (on its northern and eastern frontiers: a total of 1,215 kilometres (755 mi)). The Portuguese territory also includes a series of archipelagos in the Atlantic Ocean (the Azores and Madeira), which are strategic islands along the North Atlantic. The extreme south is not too far from the Strait of Gibraltar, leading to the Mediterranean Sea. In total, the country occupies an area of 92,090 square kilometres (35,560 sq mi) of which 91,470 square kilometres (35,320 sq mi) is land and 620 square kilometres (240 sq mi) water.

Despite these definitions, the Portugal-Spain border remains an unresolved territorial dispute between the two countries. Portugal does not recognise the border between Caia and Ribeira de Cuncos River deltas, since the beginning of the 1801 occupation of Olivenza by Spain. This territory, though under de facto Spanish occupation, remains a de jure part of Portugal, consequently no border is henceforth recognised in this area.

== Physical ==
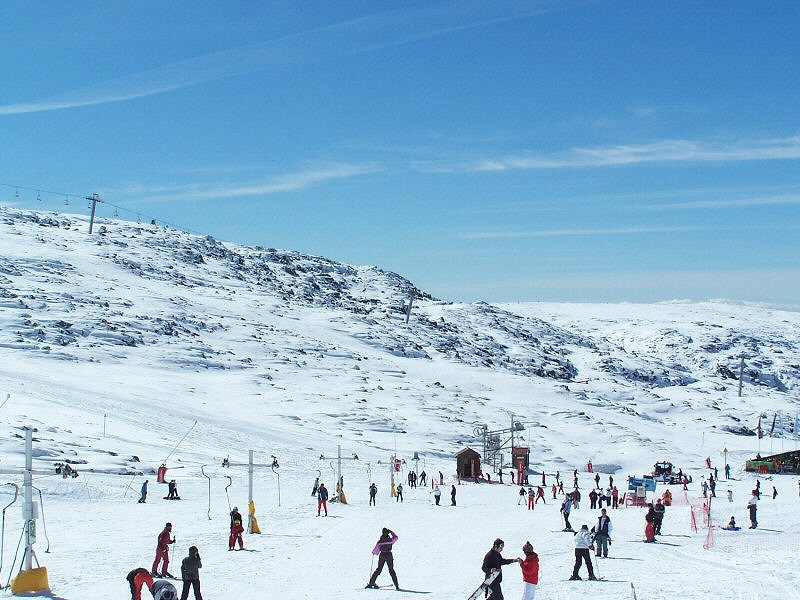
Serra da Estrela, the highest mountain range in continental Portugal and popular tourist winter destination

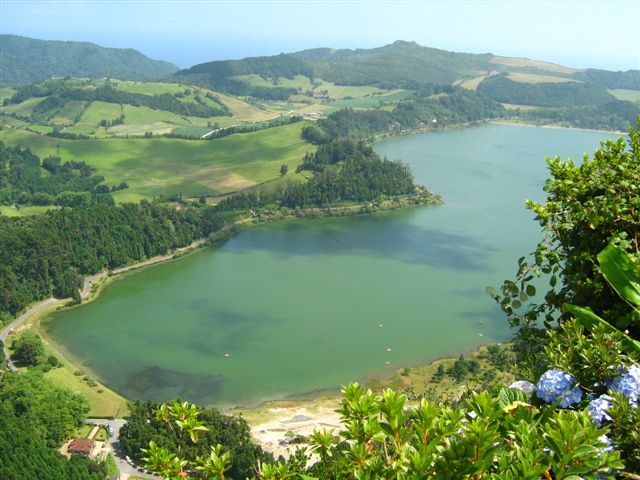
The volcanic lake of Lagoa das Furnas, on the island of São Miguel

Portugal is located on the western coast of the Iberian Peninsula and plateau, that divides the inland Mediterranean Sea from the Atlantic Ocean. It is located on the Atlantic coast of this plateau and crossed by several rivers which have their origin in Spain. Most of these rivers flow from east to west disgorging in the Atlantic; from north to south, the primary rivers are the Minho, Douro, Mondego, Tagus and the Guadiana.

=== Coastline ===
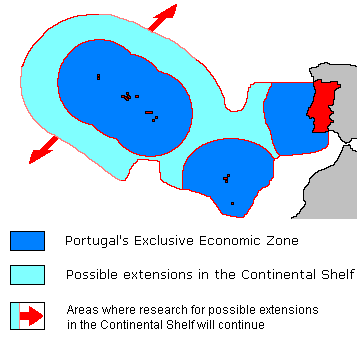
Portuguese Exclusive Economic Zone

The Portuguese continental shelf has an area of 28,000 square kilometres (11,000 sq mi), although its width is variable from 150 kilometres (93 mi) in the north to 25 kilometres (16 mi) in the south. Its strong relief is marked by deep submarine canyons and the continuation of the main rivers. The Estremadura Spur separates the Iberian Abyssal and Tagus Abyssal Plains, while the continental slope is flanked by sea-mounts and abuts against the prominent Gorringe Bank in the south. Currently, the Portuguese government claims jurisdiction to a sea depth of 200 metres (660 ft), or to the depth of exploitation.

The Portuguese coast is extensive; in addition to approximately 943 kilometres (586 mi) along the coast of continental Portugal, the archipelagos of the Azores (667 km) and Madeira (250 km) are primarily surrounded by rough cliff coastlines. Most of these landscapes alternate between rough cliffs and fine sand beaches; the region of the Algarve is recognized for its sandy beaches popular with tourists, while at the same time its coastline around Cape St. Vincent is well known for steep and forbidding cliffs. An interesting feature of the Portuguese coast is the Ria Formosa with some sandy islands and a mild and pleasant climate characterized by warm, but not very hot, summers and generally mild winters.

In contrast, the Ria de Aveiro coast (near Aveiro, referred to as "The Portuguese Venice") is formed by a delta approximately 45 kilometres (28 mi) long with a maximum width of 11 kilometres (6.8 mi), rich in fish and seabirds. Four main channels flow through several islands and islets at the mouth of the Vouga, Antuã, Boco, and Fontão Rivers. Since the 16th century, this formation of narrow headlands formed a lagoon, which allowed the formation and production of salt. It was also recognized by the Romans, whose forces exported its salt—then a precious resource—to Rome.

The Azores are sprinkled with both black-sand and boulder-lined beaches; only as a rare exception are there white-sand beaches (such as on the island of Santa Maria in Almagreira). The island of Porto Santo has one of the few extensive dune beaches in Portugal, located in the archipelago of Madeira.

Tidal gauges along the Portuguese coast have identified a 1–1.5 millimetres (0.039–0.059 in) rise in sea levels, causing large estuaries and inland deltas in some major rivers to overflow.

As a result of its maritime possessions and long coastline, Portugal has an Exclusive Economic Zone of 1,727,408 km^{2} (666,956 mi^{2}). This is the third largest EEZ of all countries in the European Union and the 20th in the world. This sea-zone, over which Portugal exercises special territorial rights over the economic exploration and use of marine resources, encircles an area of 1,727,408 square kilometres (666,956 sq mi) (divided as: Continental Portugal 327,667 km^{2}, Azores Islands 953,633 km^{2}, Madeira Islands 446,108 km^{2}).

=== Continent ===
Tectonic structures of Europe, showing Iberia and the three "Portuguese" tectonic regions (far left)

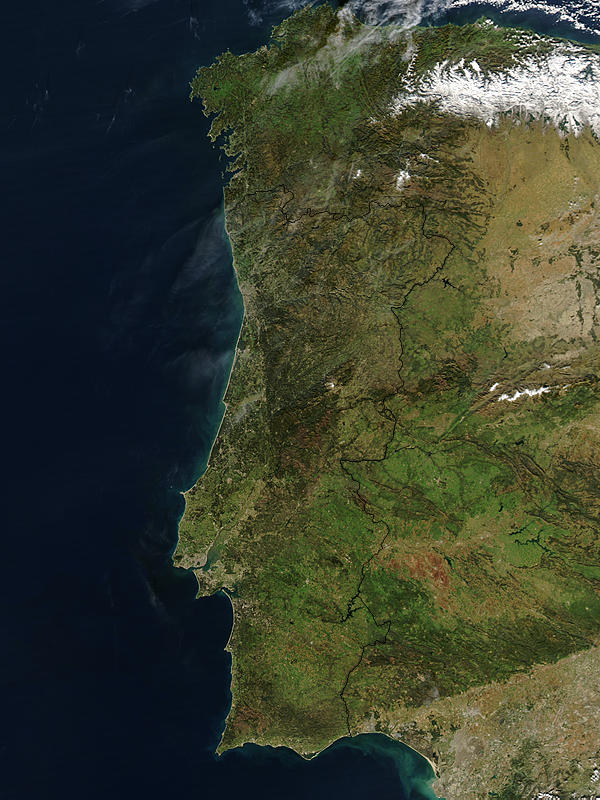
Hot, dry conditions sparked dozens of devastating wildfires in northern and central Portugal and central Spain in the summer of 2003. By the time this image was taken on January 19, 2004, the scars had begun to fade in areas, though the scars in Central Portugal and across the border in Spain are still dark red in the false-color image.

The Portuguese territory came into existence during the history of Gondwana and became aligned with European landforms after the super-continent Pangea began its slow separation into several smaller plates. The Iberian plate was formed during the Cadomian Orogeny of the late Neoproterozoic (about 650-550 Ma), from the margins of the Gondwana continent. Through collisions and accretion a group of island arcs (that included the Central Iberian Plate, Ossa-Morena Plate, South Portuguese Plate) began to disintegrate from Gondwana (along with other European fragments). These plates never separated substantially from each other since this period. By the Mesozoic, the three "Portuguese plates" were a part of the Northern France Armoric Plate until the Bay of Biscay began to separate. Following the separation of the Iberian Abyssal Plain, Iberia and Europe began to drift progressively from North America, as the Mid-Atlantic fracture zone pulled the three plates away from the larger continent. Eventually, Iberia collided with southern France attaching the region into a peninsula of Europe (during the Cenozoic). Since the late Oligocene, the Iberian plate has been moving as part of the Eurasian plate, with the boundary between Eurasia and Africa situated along the Azores–Gibraltar fracture zone.

The Iberian peninsula, defined by its coastline, is due to a fragment of the Variscan tectonic fracture zone, the Iberian-Hesperian Massif, which occupies the west-central part of the plateau. This formation is crossed by the Central System, along an east-northeast to west-southwest alignment, parallel to the European Baetic Chain (an aspect of the Alpine Chain). The Central Cordillera is itself divided into two blocks, while three main river systems drain the differing geomorphological terrains:

- the Northern Meseta (with a mean altitude of 800 metres (2,600 ft)) is drained by the Douro River (running east to west);
- the Southern Meseta (within a range of 200 to 900 metres (660 to 2,950 ft) altitude) is drained by the Tagus River (running east to west) from Spain, and the Guadiana River (running north to south), comprising the Lower Tagus and Sado Basins.

To the north the landscape is mountainous in the interior areas with plateaus, cut by four breakings lines that allow the development of more fertile agricultural areas.

The south down as far as the Algarve features mostly rolling plains with a climate somewhat warmer and drier than the cooler and rainier north. Other major rivers include the Douro, the Minho and the Guadiana, similar to the Tagus in that all originate in Spain. Another important river, the Mondego, originates in the Serra da Estrela (the highest mountains in mainland Portugal at 1,993 m). A full list of rivers is available in List of rivers of Portugal.

No large natural lakes exist in Continental Portugal, and the largest inland water surfaces are dam-originated reservoirs, such as the Alqueva Reservoir, which is the largest artificial lake in Europe, with 83 kilometers in length and 250 square kilometres in area. However, there are several small freshwater lakes in Portugal, the most notable of which are located in Serra da Estrela, Lake Comprida (Lagoa Comprida) and Lake Escura (Lagoa Escura), which were formed from ancient glaciers. Pateira de Fermentelos is a small natural lake near Aveiro, it is one of the largest natural lakes in the Iberian Peninsula and is rich in wildlife. In the Azores archipelago lakes were formed in the caldera of extinct volcanoes. Lagoa do Fogo and Lagoa das Sete Cidades (two small lakes connected by a narrow way) are among the site lakes in São Miguel Island.

Lagoons in the shores of the Atlantic exist. For instance, the Albufeira Lagoon and Óbidos Lagoon (near Foz do Arelho, Óbidos).

=== Archipelagos ===
In addition to continental Europe, Portugal consists of two Autonomous Regions in the Atlantic Ocean, consisting of the archipelagos of Madeira and Azores. Madeira is located on the African Tectonic Plate, and comprises the main island of Madeira, Porto Santo and the smaller Savage Islands. The Azores, which are located between the junction of the African, European and North American Plates, straddle the Mid-Atlantic Ridge. There are nine islands in this archipelago, usually divided into three groups (Western, Central and Eastern) and several smaller Formigas (rock outcroppings) located between São Miguel and Santa Maria Islands. Both island groups are volcanic in nature, with historic volcanology and seismic activity persisting to the present time. In addition, there are several submarine volcanos in the Azores (such as Dom João de Castro Bank), that have erupted historically (such as the Serrata eruption off the coast of Terceira Island). The last major volcanic event occurred in 1957-58 along the western coast of Faial Island, which formed the Capelinhos Volcano. Seismic events are common in the Azores. The Azores are occasionally subject to very strong earthquakes, as is the continental coast. Wildfires occur mostly in the summer in mainland Portugal and extreme weather in the form of strong winds and floods also occurs mainly in winter. The Azores are occasionally stricken by tropical cyclones such as Hurricane Jeanne (1998) and Hurricane Gordon (2006).

== Climate ==
Köppen climate classification map of Portugal (1991-2020).

Continental Portugal has a clear contrast between the cool to warm (Csb) and hot (Csa) summers.

Most of Portugal has a Mediterranean climate according to the Köppen climate classification: "Csa" (or hot-summer Mediterranean climate) in most of the lands south of the Tagus River, inland Douro Valley in the Norte Region, eastern Azores and the Madeira archipelago. The "Csb" warm-summer Mediterranean pattern can be found north of that same river and in Costa Vicentina in coastal Southern Portugal. Most of the Azores have a humid subtropical climate or "Cfa", while a small region in inland Alentejo has BSk or semi-arid climate. The Savage Islands are the only region to have an arid climate or "BWh". The sea surface temperatures in these islands vary from 18.5 °C (65.3 °F) in winter to 23–24 °C (73.4–75.2 °F) in the summer, occasionally reaching 26 °C (78.8 °F).

The annual average temperature in mainland Portugal varies from 12–13 °C (53.6–55.4 °F) in the mountainous interior north to 17–19 °C (62.6–66.2 °F) in the south (in general the south is warmer and drier than the north). The Madeira and Azores archipelagos have a narrower temperature range. Funchal is the warmest city in Portugal, with an average annual temperature of 20 °C (68 °F). Extreme temperatures occur in the mountains in the interior North and Centre of the country in winter, where they may fall below −10 °C (14 °F) or in rare occasions below −15 °C (5 °F), particularly in the higher peaks of Serra da Estrela, and in southeastern parts in the summer, sometimes exceeding 45 °C (113 °F).

The official absolute extreme temperatures are −16 °C (3.2 °F) in Penhas da Saúde on 4 February 1954 and Miranda do Douro, and 47.4 °C (117.3 °F) in Amareleja in the Alentejo region, on 1 August 2003. There are, however, unofficial records of 50.5 °C (122.9 °F) on 4 August 1881 in Riodades, São João da Pesqueira and 70 °C (158.0 °F) on 6 July 1949 in Figueira da Foz in an apparent heat burst (see the Highest temperature recorded on Earth). Such temperatures are not validated since these were measured in enclosures that were much more susceptible to solar radiation and/or in enclosed gardens which tend to heat up a lot more than in the open where temperatures should be measured. There are also records of −17.5 °C (0.5 °F) from a Polytechnic Institute in Bragança, and below −20 °C (−4.0 °F) in Serra da Estrela, which have no official value since they were not recorded by IPMA.

The annual average rainfall in continental Portugal varies from around 3,000 mm (118.1 in) in a few mountain tops in the north at Peneda-Gerês National Park to around 450 mm (17.7 in) in inland parts of Alentejo. In Macaronesia however, Pico Island holds the record with upwards of 5,000 mm (196.9 in) in the higher altitudes and the Savage Islands around 200 mm (7.9 in). Portugal as a whole is amongst the sunniest areas in Europe, with around 2300–3200 hours of sunshine a year, an average of 4-6h in winter and 10-12h in the summer. The sea surface temperature is higher in the south coast where it varies from 15.5–16 °C (59.9–60.8 °F) in January to 21–23 °C (69.8–73.4 °F) in August, occasionally reaching 25 °C (77 °F); on the west coast the sea surface temperature is around 14–16 °C (57.2–60.8 °F) in winter and 18–20 °C (64–68 °F) in the summer.

Climate data for Continental Portugal, 1991-2020 normals, 2003-present extremes
Month	Jan	Feb	Mar	Apr	May	Jun	Jul	Aug	Sep	Oct	Nov	Dec	Year
Record high °C (°F)	26.3 (79.3)	26.9 (80.4)	31.6 (88.9)	36.9 (98.4)	40.3 (104.5)	46.6 (115.9)	47.0 (116.6)	47.4 (117.3)	45.0 (113.0)	38.5 (101.3)	29.1 (84.4)	26.4 (79.5)	47.4 (117.3)
Mean daily maximum °C (°F)	13.4 (56.1)	14.7 (58.5)	17.6 (63.7)	19.3 (66.7)	22.5 (72.5)	26.7 (80.1)	29.5 (85.1)	29.9 (85.8)	26.8 (80.2)	22.0 (71.6)	16.8 (62.2)	13.9 (57.0)	21.1 (70.0)
Daily mean °C (°F)	9.1 (48.4)	9.9 (49.8)	12.4 (54.3)	14.0 (57.2)	16.9 (62.4)	20.4 (68.7)	22.6 (72.7)	22.9 (73.2)	20.5 (68.9)	16.8 (62.2)	12.3 (54.1)	9.8 (49.6)	15.6 (60.1)
Mean daily minimum °C (°F)	4.7 (40.5)	5.0 (41.0)	7.2 (45.0)	8.7 (47.7)	11.2 (52.2)	14.0 (57.2)	15.8 (60.4)	15.9 (60.6)	14.2 (57.6)	11.6 (52.9)	7.9 (46.2)	5.6 (42.1)	10.2 (50.3)
Record low °C (°F)	−10.2 (13.6)	−10.2 (13.6)	−12.9 (8.8)	−4.8 (23.4)	−2.2 (28.0)	−0.9 (30.4)	1.5 (34.7)	2.7 (36.9)	−0.8 (30.6)	−3.1 (26.4)	−10.9 (12.4)	−9.0 (15.8)	−12.9 (8.8)
Average precipitation mm (inches)	105.0 (4.13)	73.4 (2.89)	77.5 (3.05)	75.5 (2.97)	61.9 (2.44)	21.3 (0.84)	9.9 (0.39)	13.6 (0.54)	42.6 (1.68)	109.2 (4.30)	114.1 (4.49)	115.5 (4.55)	819.5 (32.27)
Average relative humidity (%)	85	82	79	76	72	65	57	56	63	76	83	85	73
Source: IPMA, Portal do Clima (Humidity 1971-2000)

=== Climate change ===
Climate change in Portugal is causing rising temperatures and longer-lasting heat waves, decreases in average rainfall and increases in the number of extremely rainy days (causing droughts and floods), and rising sea levels which will threaten the country's many coastal populations. Portugal is among the countries worst affected by wild fires.

In 2023 Portugal emitted around 339 million tonnes of greenhouse gases (about 5 tonnes per person), equivalent to around 1% of global total emissions. As a EU member state, Portugal is part of their joint plan to reduce emissions by a minimum of 55% by 2030, compared to the level of emissions in 1990. Portugal has committed to carbon neutrality and net zero by 2050. As of 2023, oil made up 44% of Portugal's total energy supply. However the country phased out coal-fired generation in 2021 and has been developing renewable energies such as hydopower and wind power and investing in public transport and electric vehicles.

=== UV Index table ===
Climate data for Continental Portugal
Month	Jan	Feb	Mar	Apr	May	Jun	Jul	Aug	Sep	Oct	Nov	Dec	Year
Average ultraviolet index	2	3	5	6	8	9	9	8	6	4	3	2	5
Source: weather-atlas

Climate data for the Azores
Month	Jan	Feb	Mar	Apr	May	Jun	Jul	Aug	Sep	Oct	Nov	Dec	Year
Average ultraviolet index	2	3	5	7	8	9	9	8	7	5	3	2	6
Source: weather-atlas

Climate data for Madeira
Month	Jan	Feb	Mar	Apr	May	Jun	Jul	Aug	Sep	Oct	Nov	Dec	Year
Average ultraviolet index	3	5	6	8	9	10	10	10	8	6	4	3	7
Source: weather-atlas

== Forest ==
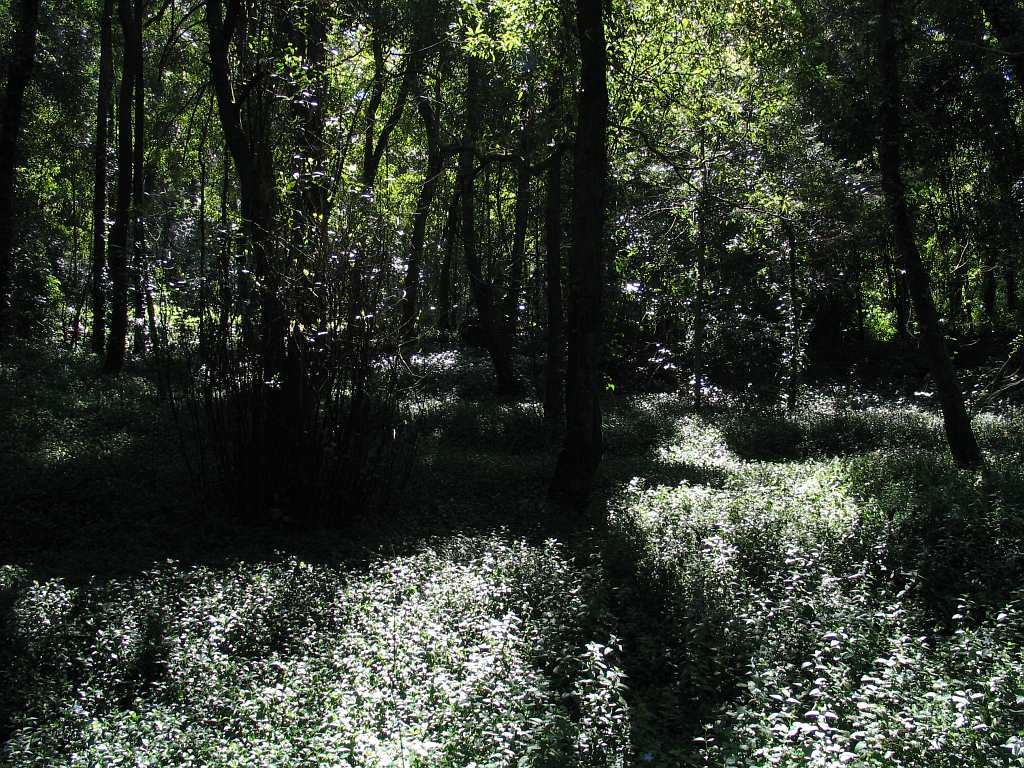
Forest in Sintra

In 2017, the area occupied by forest in mainland Portugal was 39.0% (3,472,459 hectares).

Portugal has one of the largest forested areas in Europe (35.8%).

About 85% of Portugal's forest is privately owned, only 3% belongs to the Portuguese state, and the remaining 12% are communal lands belonging to local communities.

=== Species distribution ===
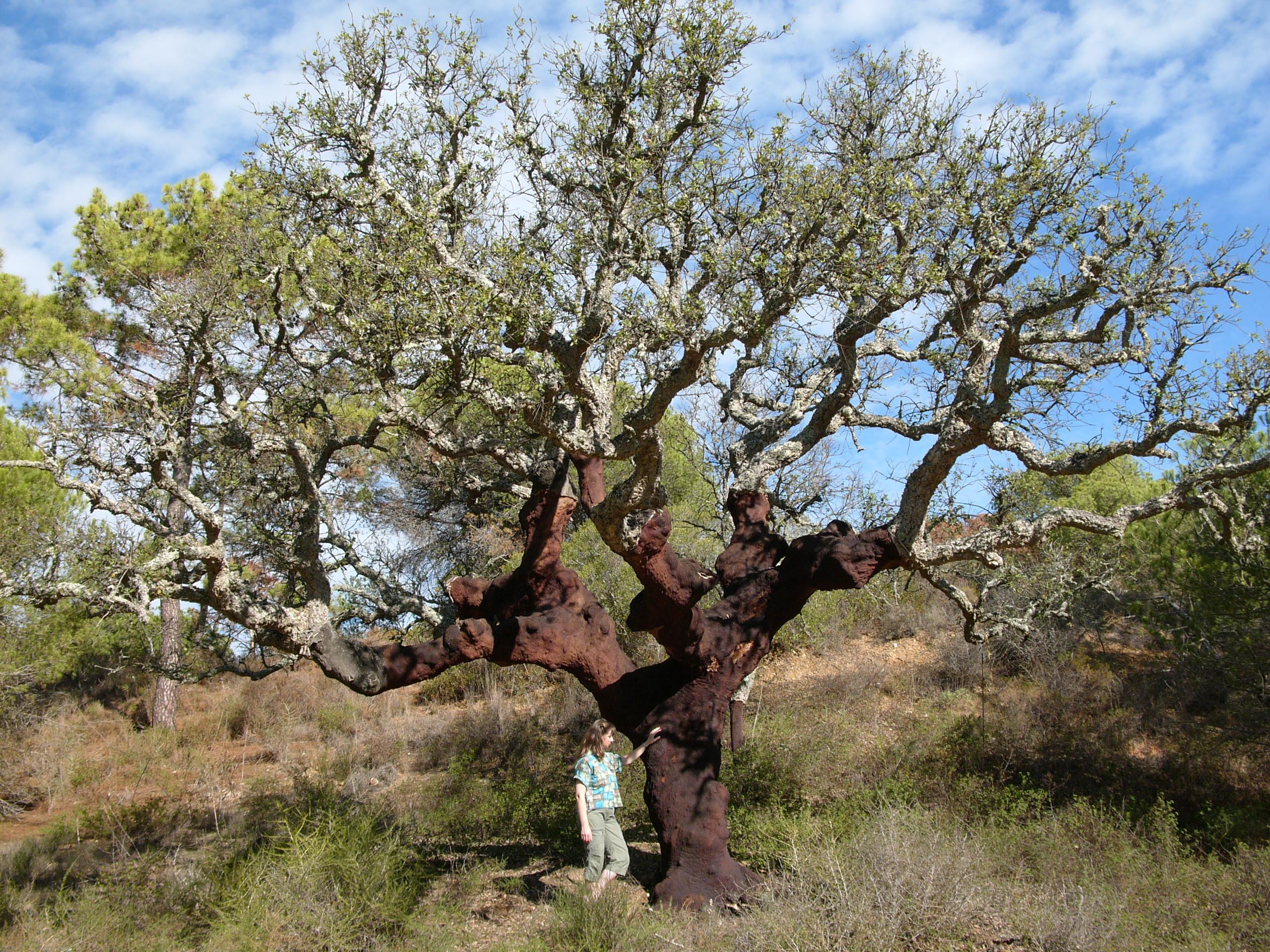
Cork oak in the Algarve

Species of Quercus in Portugal

Forest in mainland Portugal (2001)
Forest species	% forest area	Area (ha)
Maritime pine	29.1	976,069
Stone pine	2.3	77,650
Other conifers	0.8	27,358
Holm oak	13.8	461,577
Oaks	3.9	130,899
Sweet chestnut	1.2	40,579
Eucalyptuss	20.1	672,149
Cork oak	21.3	712,813
Other broadleaves	3.0	102,037
Total	100.0	3,349,327

Other species are being introduced such as Gaillardia aristata in the Azores and Madeira archipelagos; Jacobaea minuta in southern Portugal; Rhaponticum longifolium in the surroundings of Leiria; the French marigold (Tagetes patula) on the border of the Province of Salamanca; Zinnia elegans in the Beira Alta region; Salvia viridis in Estremadura; pink crownvetch (Securigera varia) in Coimbra; or Claytonia perfoliata in northern Portugal.

==== Eucalyptus forest ====
Eucalyptus is mainly found:

- in the Beira region (Baixo Vouga and Beira Interior Sul).
- other important regions: Tâmega, Médio Tejo, Oeste and Alto Alentejo.

==== Decline of the elm ====
Since 1920, Dutch elm disease has caused a general decline of the species throughout Europe. The disease is caused by a fungus (Ophiostoma ulmi) that blocks the water-conducting vessels of the elm. External symptoms include wilting and the loss of branches and parts of the crown until the entire tree dies. The fungus spreads through the elm bark beetle and is considered one of the worst invasive species worldwide, affecting Europe, North America, and all elms planted in gardens of former European colonies. Also an ornamental tree, initially used to line Avenida da Liberdade, it is now rare in Portuguese streets and uncommon as an adult tree in the countryside, where it was known as negrilho. The last survivors have been left to die without treatment, contaminating any others that may exist healthy.

=== Natural heritage ===
Notable in its natural heritage is a site declared a World Heritage Site by UNESCO in 1999 for the size and quality of the laurisilva, a type of laurel forest: the Laurisilva of Madeira. It has seven biosphere reserves: Paúl do Boquilobo (1981), Corvo Island (2007), Graciosa Island (2007), Flores Island (2009), Gerês–Xurés, transboundary with Spain, the Berlengas Archipelago (2011) and Santana (2011). A total of 86,581 hectares are protected as wetlands of international importance under the Ramsar Convention, with a total of 28 Ramsar sites.

== Fauna ==
The fauna of mammals is very diverse and includes the fox, the badger, the Iberian lynx, the Iberian wolf, the Iberian ibex, the European wildcat, the European hare, the weasel, the Egyptian mongoose, the genet and, occasionally, the Brown bear (near the Minho River and Peneda-Gerês National Park), among others. Portugal is an important stopover for bird migrations between Europe and Africa, especially in places such as Cape St. Vincent or the Serra de Monchique. The country has about 600 species of birds, of which 235 are breeding, and new records are reported almost every year.

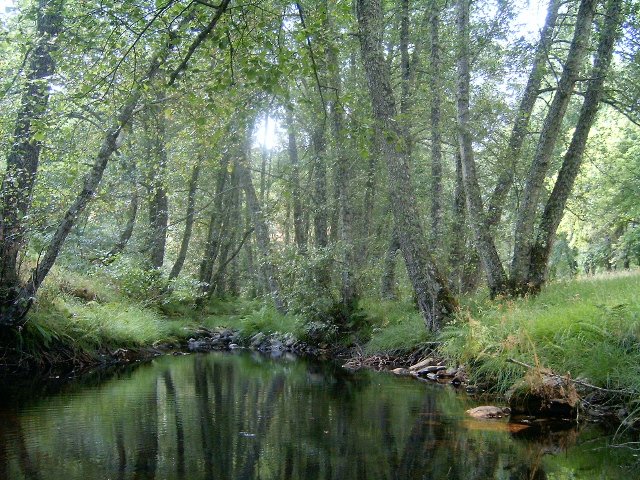
Montesinho Natural Park, in northeastern Portugal.

Portugal has a large number of freshwater fish species ranging from the giant catfish in the International Tagus Natural Park, to small endemic species that live only in small lakes. Some of these rare species are seriously threatened due to habitat destruction, pollution and droughts. Portuguese marine waters are among the richest in biodiversity in the world, with marine species numbering around one thousand and including the sardine, tuna and Atlantic mackerel.

== Environment ==
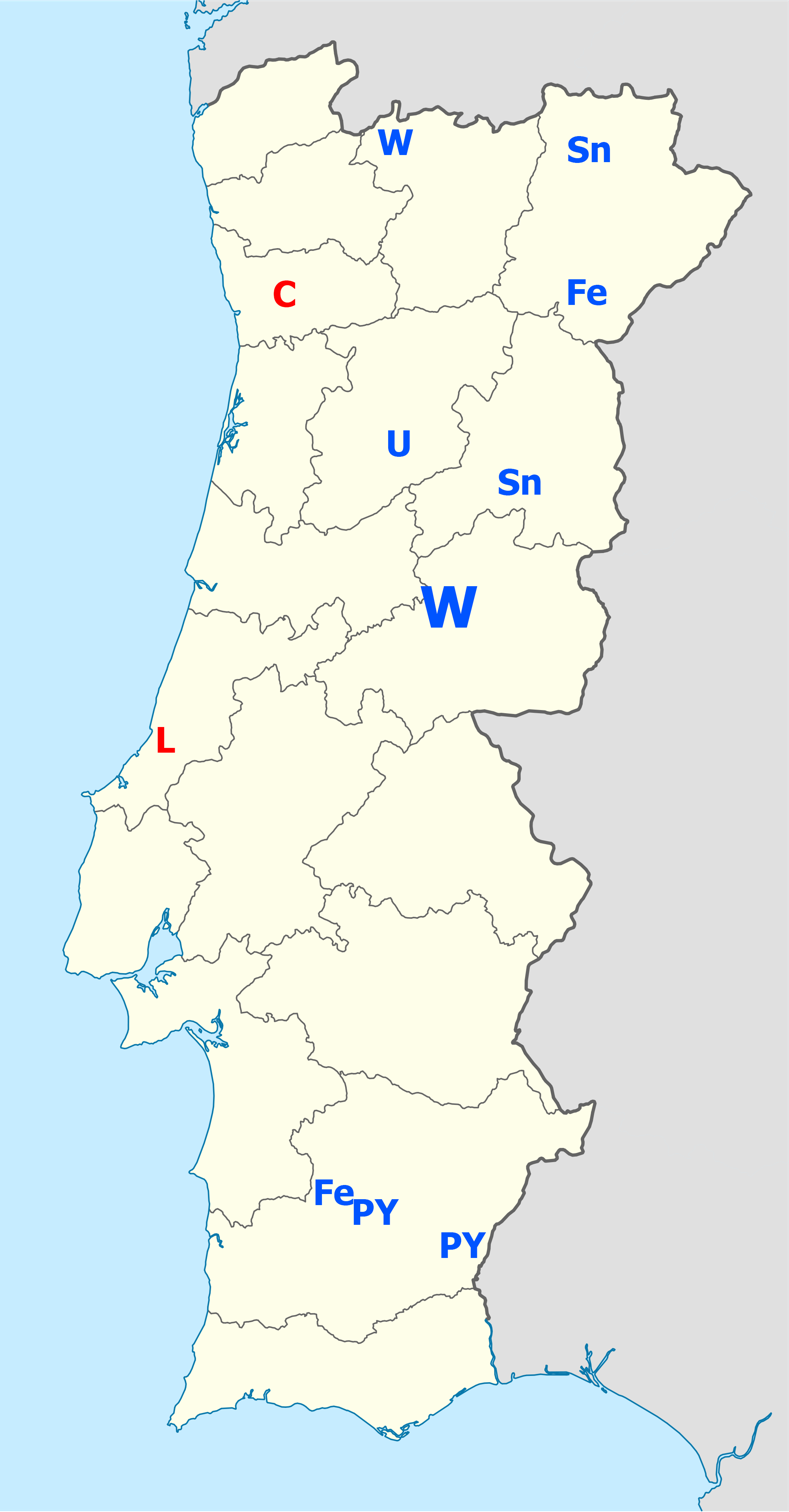
Mineral resources of Portugal. Fe — iron ore, PY — pyrite, Sn — tin, W — tungsten, U — uranium, C — coal, L — lignite.

In Portugal, the phenomenon of upwelling can be observed, especially on the west coast, which makes the sea extremely rich in nutrients and biodiversity. The Protected areas of Portugal include one national park, thirteen natural parks, nine nature reserves, five natural monuments and six protected landscapes. In 2005, the protected landscape area of the Litoral de Esposende was classified as natural park for the "conservation of the coastal cordon and its physical, aesthetic and landscape elements."

Environment - current issues: soil erosion; air pollution caused by industrial and vehicle emissions; water pollution, especially in coastal areas

Environment - international agreements:
party to: Air Pollution, Biodiversity, Climate Change, Desertification, Endangered Species, Hazardous Wastes, Law of the Sea, Marine Dumping, Marine Life Conservation, Ozone Layer Protection, Ship Pollution, Tropical Timber 83, Tropical Timber 94, Wetlands
signed, but not ratified: Air Pollution-Persistent Organic Pollutants, Air Pollution-Volatile Organic Compounds, Climate Change-Kyoto Protocol, Environmental Modification, Nuclear Test Ban

Terrain: Mountainous and hilly north of the Tagus River, rolling plains in south

Elevation extremes:
lowest point: Atlantic Ocean 0 m
highest point: Ponta do Pico (Pico or Pico Alto) on Ilha do Pico in the Azores 2,351 m

(Mainland: Torre (Serra da Estrela) 1,993m)

Natural resources: fish, forests (cork), tungsten, iron ore, uranium ore, marble, arable land, hydroelectric power

Land use:
arable land: 26%
permanent crops: 9%
permanent pastures: 9%
forests and woodland: 36%
other: 20% (1993 est.)

Irrigated land: 6,300 km^{2} (1993 est.)

== See also ==
- Cabo da Roca
- Forests of the Iberian Peninsula
