= Algoz =

- Civil parish
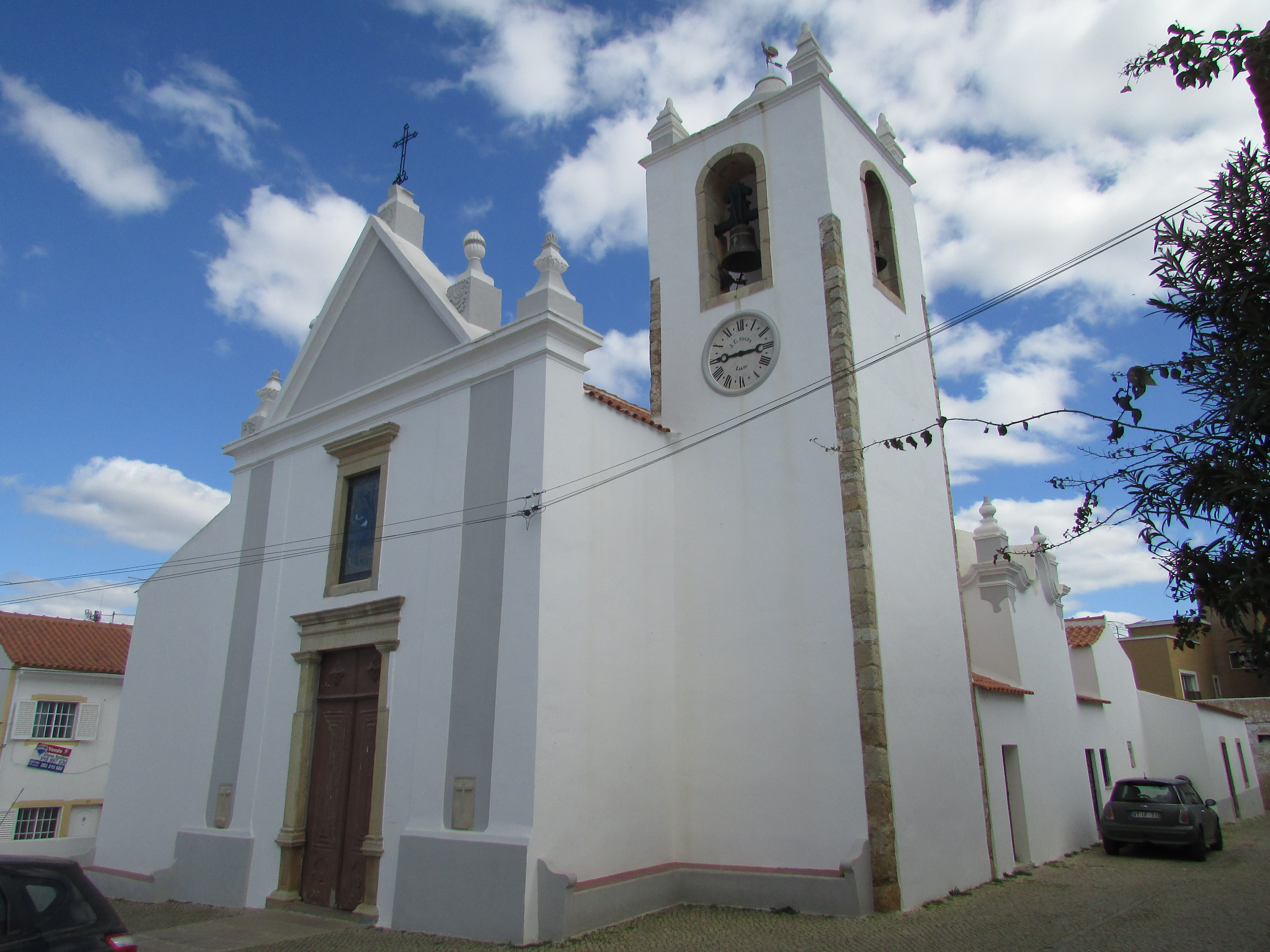
- Main parish church of Algoz

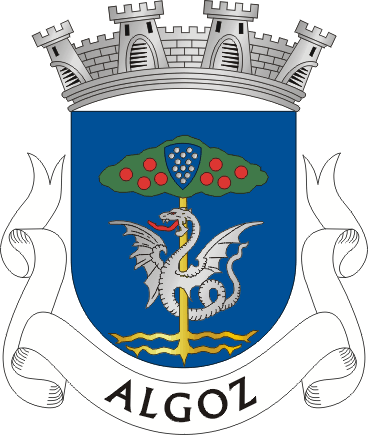
- Coat of arms

- Location in Portugal
- Coordinates: 37°10′0″N 8°18′0″W
- Country: Portugal
- Region: Algarve
- Intermunic. comm.: Algarve
- District: Faro
- Municipality: Silves
- Disbanded: 2013

Area
  - Total: 38.91 km^{2} (15.02 sq mi)

Population (2001)
  - Total: 2,946
  - Density: 75.71/km^{2} (196.1/sq mi)
- Time zone: UTC+00:00 (WET)
  - Summer (DST): UTC+01:00 (WEST)
- Postal code: 8365

Algoz (Portuguese pronunciation: [alˈɣɔʃ]) is a town and the seat of the civil parish of Algoz e Tunes in the municipality of Silves, in Algarve, Portugal. It has about 3000 inhabitants.

== History ==
According to some theories, the name of the town has its origins in the Arabic word Al-Gûzz or Al-Gozz which derives from the name of the Turkic Oghuz people (also known as Turkomans), whose members settled in the area in the 12th century. In Portuguese, the word algoz means executioner or torturer because formal executioners and torturers recruited by the de jure Islamic authorities of the region under Muslim rule, after the Muslim conquest of the Iberian Peninsula, were Oghuz. Other sources cite an unnamed Castilian king arrived to the area to fight the Moors as the origin of the name. According to this source, this king used the expression "algo és" (Portuguese) or "algo es" (Spanish) which means "is something" referring to the small village when told about the little importance of the locality.

The Kingdom of Portugal permanently reconquered all of the Algarve in the 13th century, and the Kingdom of the Algarve became a nominal kingdom within the Kingdom of Portugal.

The patron saint of Algoz is Our Lady of Mercy.

To the south of the town on a hill is the Chapel of Nossa Senhora do Pilar, from which there are fine views across the surroundings. On the eastern slopes of this hill there is a meadow called Amoreira. There have been many archaeological findings there, revealing much about Algoz's past. There are also two other chapels in the area. The one in the west is dedicated to Saint Sebastian and one in the east is dedicated to Saint Joseph.

Formerly a village, Algoz was upgraded to town status on July 12, 2001. In 2013, the civil parish of Algoz merged into the new civil parish of Algoz e Tunes and the town of Algoz became the seat of the new civil parish.

== Geography ==
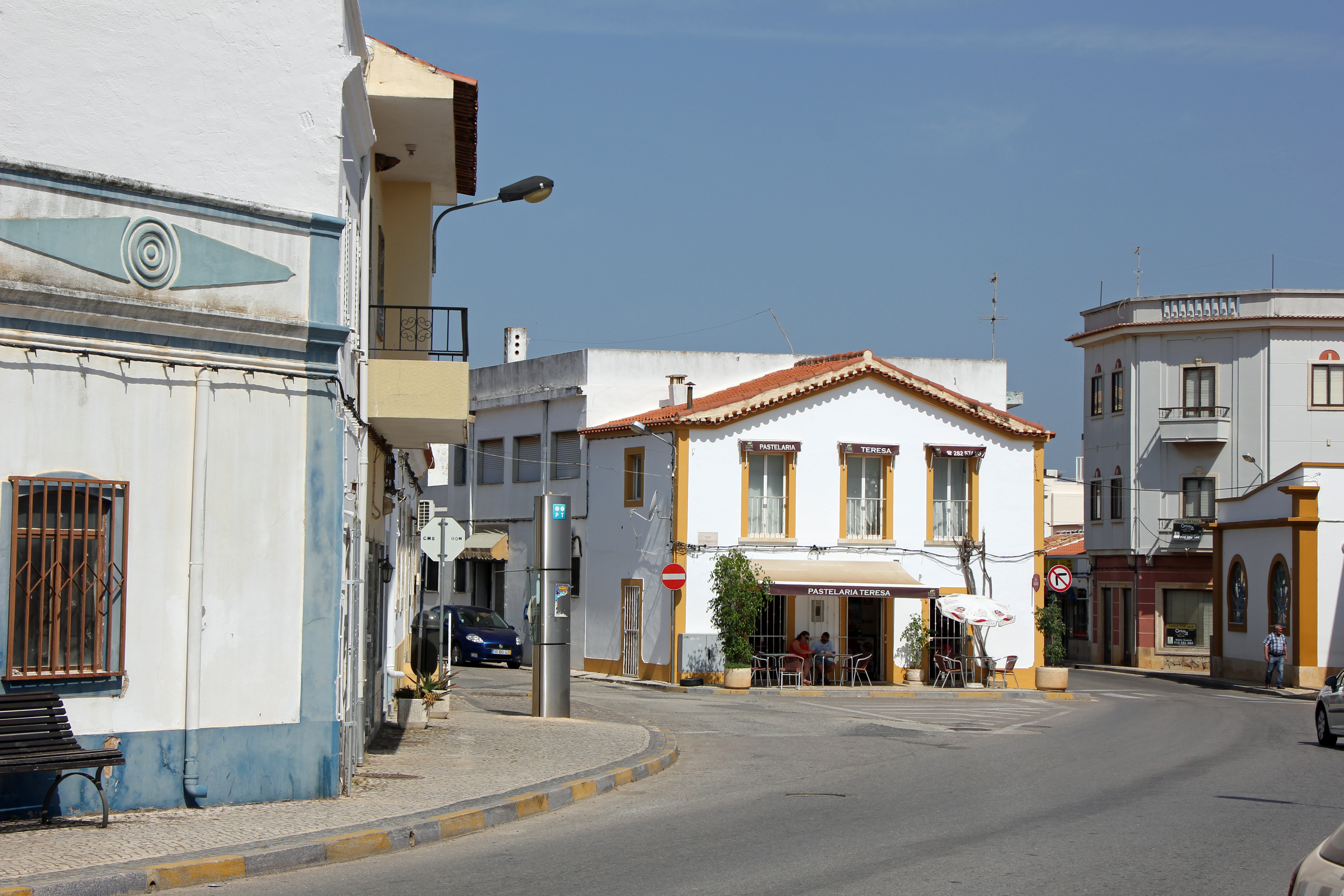
Town center

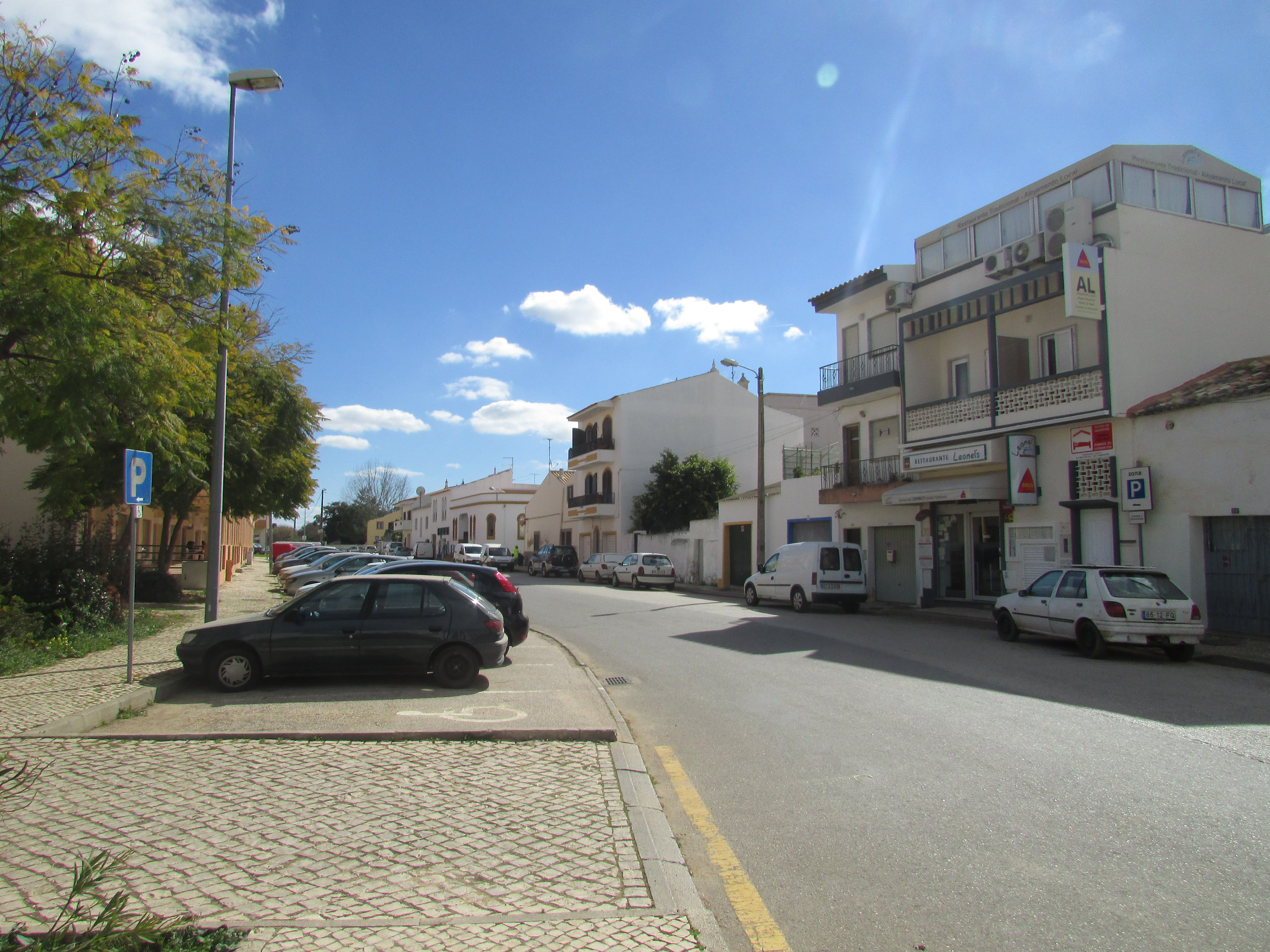
Rua do Ribeiro street in Algoz. Part of the Algoz river runs underground for 0.32 kilometres (0.2 mi) below the street.

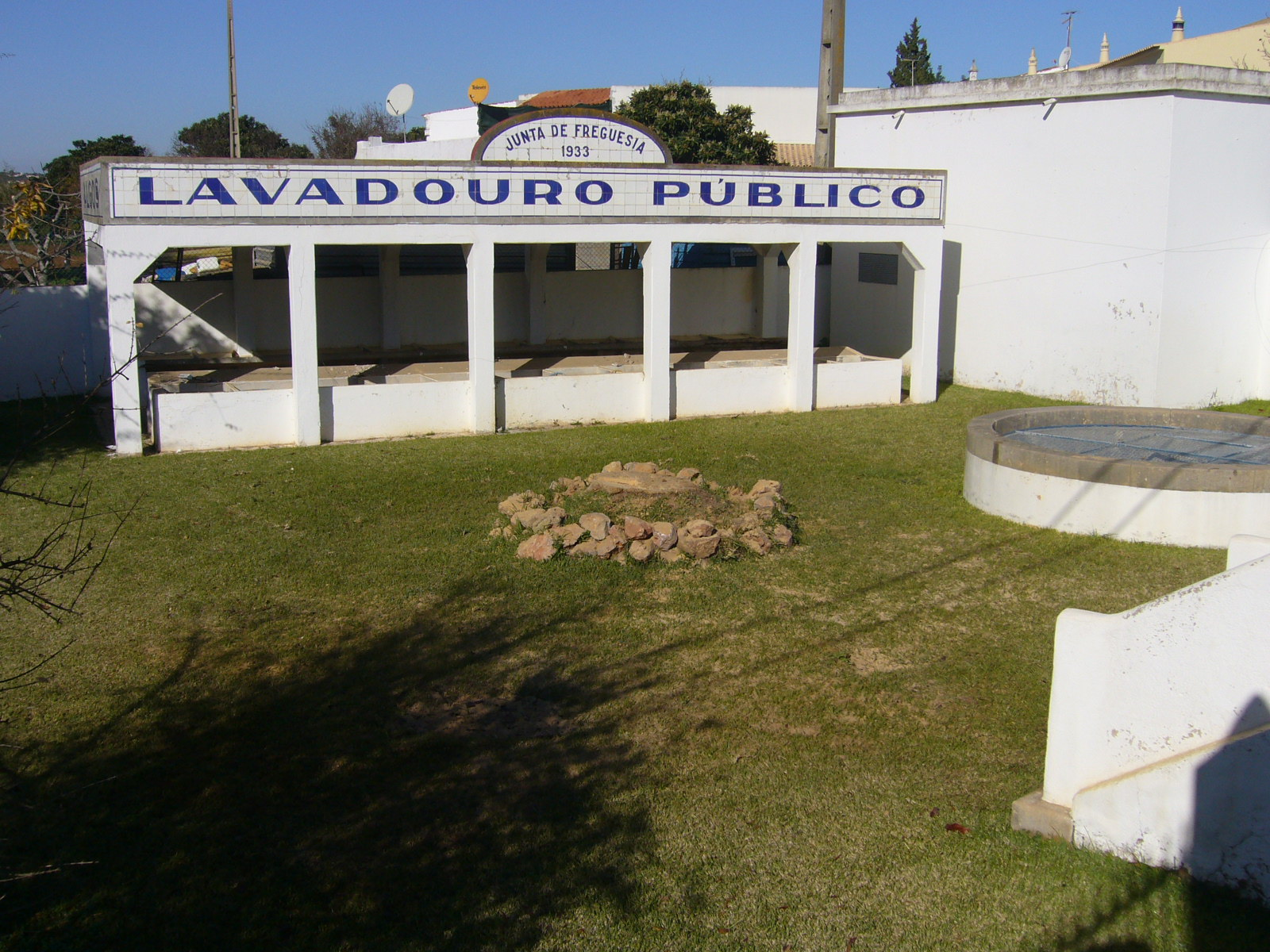
The public laundry built by the parish council in 1933

The town of Algoz, in Silves municipality, is in an area of the Algarve called the Barrocal or gulley region. It is 14 kilometres (8.7 mi) southeast of the city of Silves and 258 kilometres (160 mi) south-southeast of Lisbon, the capital city of Portugal. The settlement stretches along an open valley, bounded on the south by a mountain and on the west by further highlands. The parish is bordered to the north by São Bartolomeu de Messines, to the east is Tunes and Pêra on the southwest. Algoz is very close to the neighboring civil parish of Guia, in the municipality of Albufeira, whose the seat (the town of Guia proper) is located 4.6 kilometers to the south of the town of Algoz by road.

A stream also called the Algoz runs to the north of the town of Algoz from an easterly direction, and from the northwest a tributary called Barranco Longo joins the stream. Part of the Algoz river runs underground for 0.32 kilometres (0.2 mi) below the Rua do Ribeiro street in Algoz. Further on the stream flows under the Alcantarilha bridge and the name of the stream changes to the Enxurrada or the Alcantarilha stream. This watercourse finally flows into the Atlantic Ocean between Pêra and Armação de Pêra. The town of Algoz proper is about 40 meters high above sea level and about 9 kilometres from the coast.

== Economy ==
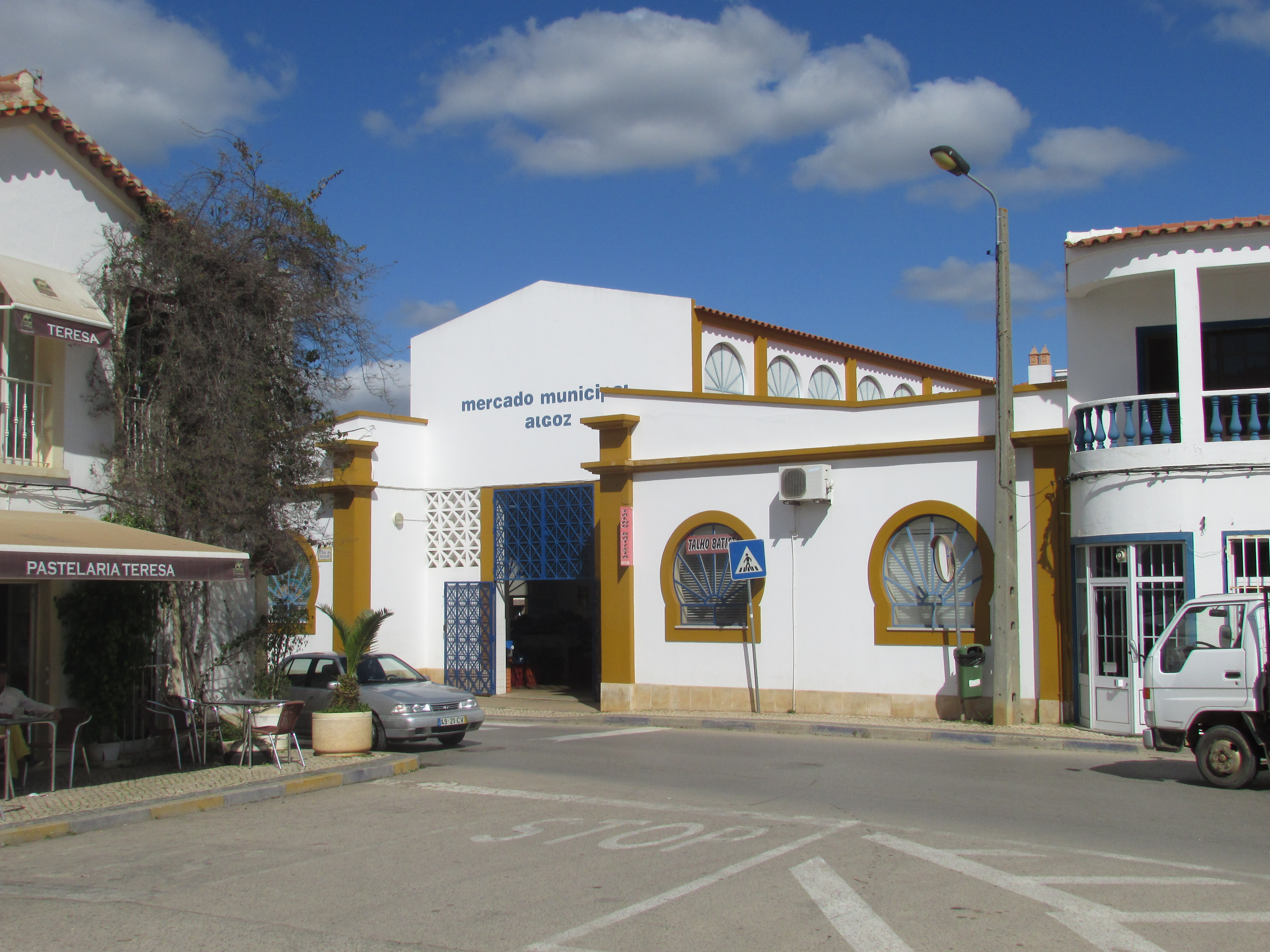
The Municipal Market located on Rua da Moinheta street

The economy of Algoz relies on agribusiness from fruticulture-related, including oranges, to olive and winery-related, logistics including package delivery, waste management and wholesalers. Unlike many of the most renowned places in the region, Algoz isn't on the seaside of Algarve, but even so, tourism is also important since the town is well-connected to the rest of Algarve which is one of the most reputed travel destinations in Europe. The town counts a kindergarten, primary, preparatory and a secondary school among its largest state-run employers. There are also offices for the local authorities of the freguesia, the civil parish, which is the third-level administrative subdivision of Portugal, services like solicitor, bank branch, a diversity of local shops and workshops, small local supermarket, cafés and a number of restaurants. There is a daily fresh produce market for local small-time farmers and a larger and more diversified market is held on the second Monday of every month as well as a fair which is held twice a year on 10 August, the day of Saint Michael (São Miguel), and on the day of Saint Louis (São Luís) on the last Sunday in September. The lands around the town of Algoz are used for agricultural production. The produce includes wheat, almonds, figs and olive oil. There are also vineyards and orange orchards. Many greenhouses for growing tomatoes, cauliflowers, strawberries and other early fruits which are sent to larger markets are found in the area. There are also flourmillls and olive pressing plants in the parish. The area also has manufacturing plants that produce bricks, tiles and other ceramic items. A couple of plants specialize in reinforced concrete products.

== Transportation ==
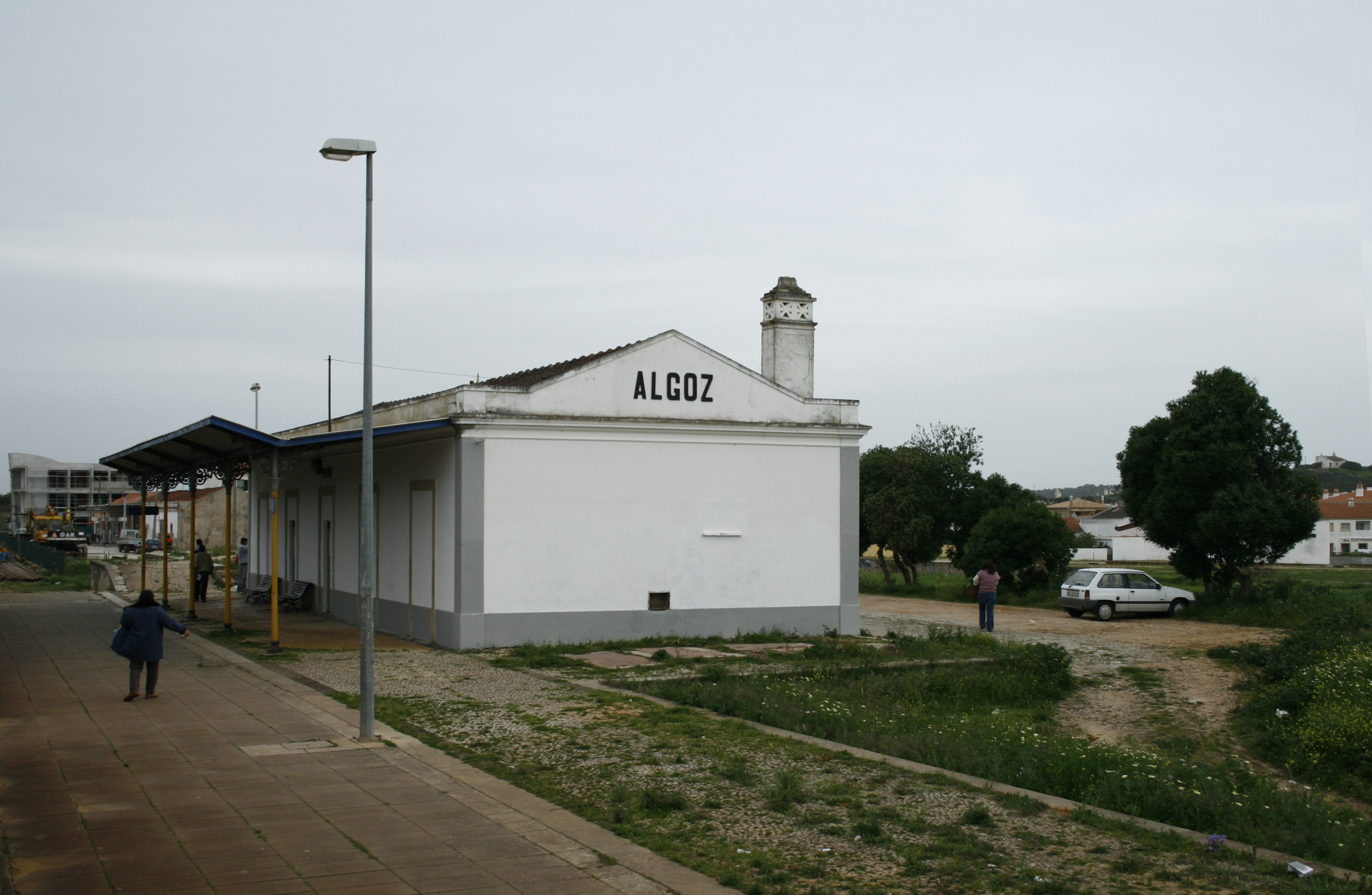
Algoz railway station

Not far from the town center there is a small railway station, the Algoz halt of the Linha do Algarve railway line. The town is served by local bus services, ride-hailing services and taxis. Faro Airport is about 45 kilometers from Algoz.

== Education ==
Algoz has a state-run kindergarten as well as primary, preparatory and lower secondary school which provide education services from the 1st grade to the 9th grade. Further education from the 10th grade to the 12th grade and beyond are attained in the neighboring city of Silves which is the seat of the municipality as well as in the rest of the region of Algarve which has a major state-run university, the University of Algarve headquartered in Faro (40 kilometers away) with a branch in Portimão (28 kilometers away).

== Sports ==
Algoz has a sports club called Sport Algoz e Benfica which is named after one of the biggest Portuguese football clubs, the Sport Lisboa e Benfica from Lisbon, the capital city of Portugal. It has football, gymnastics and zumba fitness departments. Sport Algoz e Benfica was founded on the July 1st, 1938 as an affiliated club of Sport Lisboa e Benfica.
