= Algoz River =

River of the Algarve, Portugal

- Native name: Ribeiro de Algoz (Portuguese)

Location
- Country: Portugal
- Region: Algarve
- District: Faro
- Municipality: Silves

Physical characteristics
- Source
  - location: Tunes, Algarve
  - coordinates: 37°09′13.4″N 8°15′55.5″W
- Source confluence
  - location: Alcantarilha River
  - coordinates: 37°09′27.5″N 8°20′52.7″W
- Mouth: The south central coast of the Algarve into the Atlantic at Armação de Pêra via the Alcantarilha River

The Algoz River (Portuguese pronunciation: [alˈɣɔʃ]) is a small river in the south central region of the Algarve, Portugal, which rises near the village of Tunes and passes through the town of Algoz, the seat of the civil parish of Algoz e Tunes. The river is a tributary of the Alcantarilha River and runs for a distance of 10.5 kilometres (6.5 mi) from its source to its conflux with the Alcantarilha River.

== Description ==
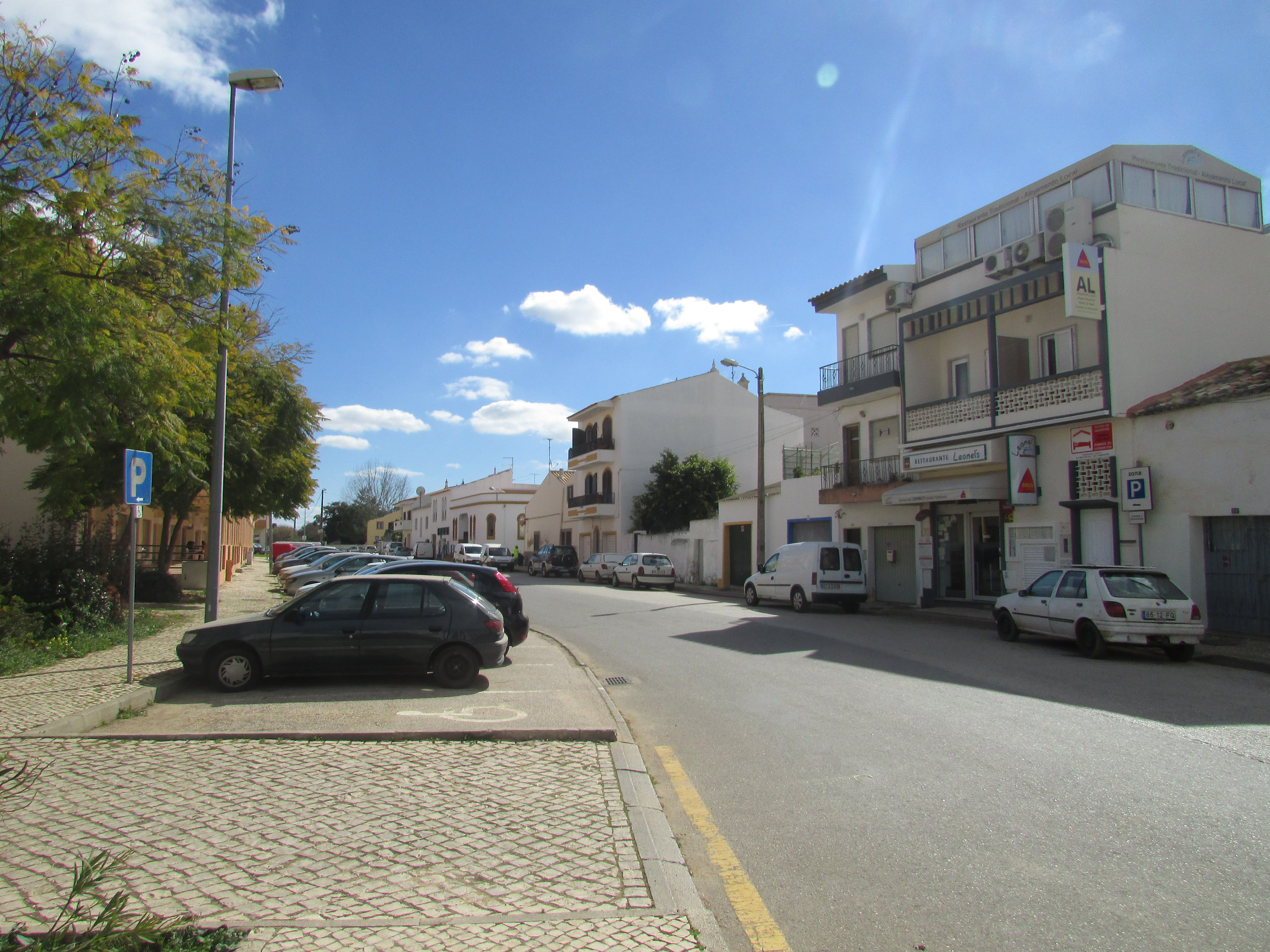
Rua do Ribeiro street in Algoz.

The stream runs to the north of the town of Algoz from an easterly direction, and from the north west a tributary called Barranco Longo joins the stream. Part of the river runs underground for 0.32 kilometres (0.2 mi) below the Rua do Ribeiro in the town of Algoz. North west of the town a tributary joins the river which is called Barranco Longo. Further on the stream flows under the Alcantarilha bridge and the name of the stream changes to the Enxurrada or the Alcantarilha stream. This watercourse finally flows into the Atlantic Ocean between Pêra and Armação de Pêra.
