= Vizela (disambiguation) =

Vizela is a town and a municipality in Portugal. It may also refer to:

- Vizela River, a river in northern Portugal
- F.C. Vizela, a football club in Portugal
- Estádio do Futebol Clube de Vizela, a football stadium in Portugal
