= ISNA =

ISNA or Isna may refer to:

- Intersex Society of North America, a former non-profit advocacy group (closed in 2008)
- Iranian Students' News Agency, a news organization led by Iranian university students
- Islamic Society of North America, a non-profit Muslim religious organization based in Plainfield, Indiana
- Isna River, Portugal

== See also ==
- IISNA, the Islamic Information and Services Network of Australasia
- Esna, an ancient Egyptian city
