= Tunes railway station =

Railway station in Portugal

Tunes
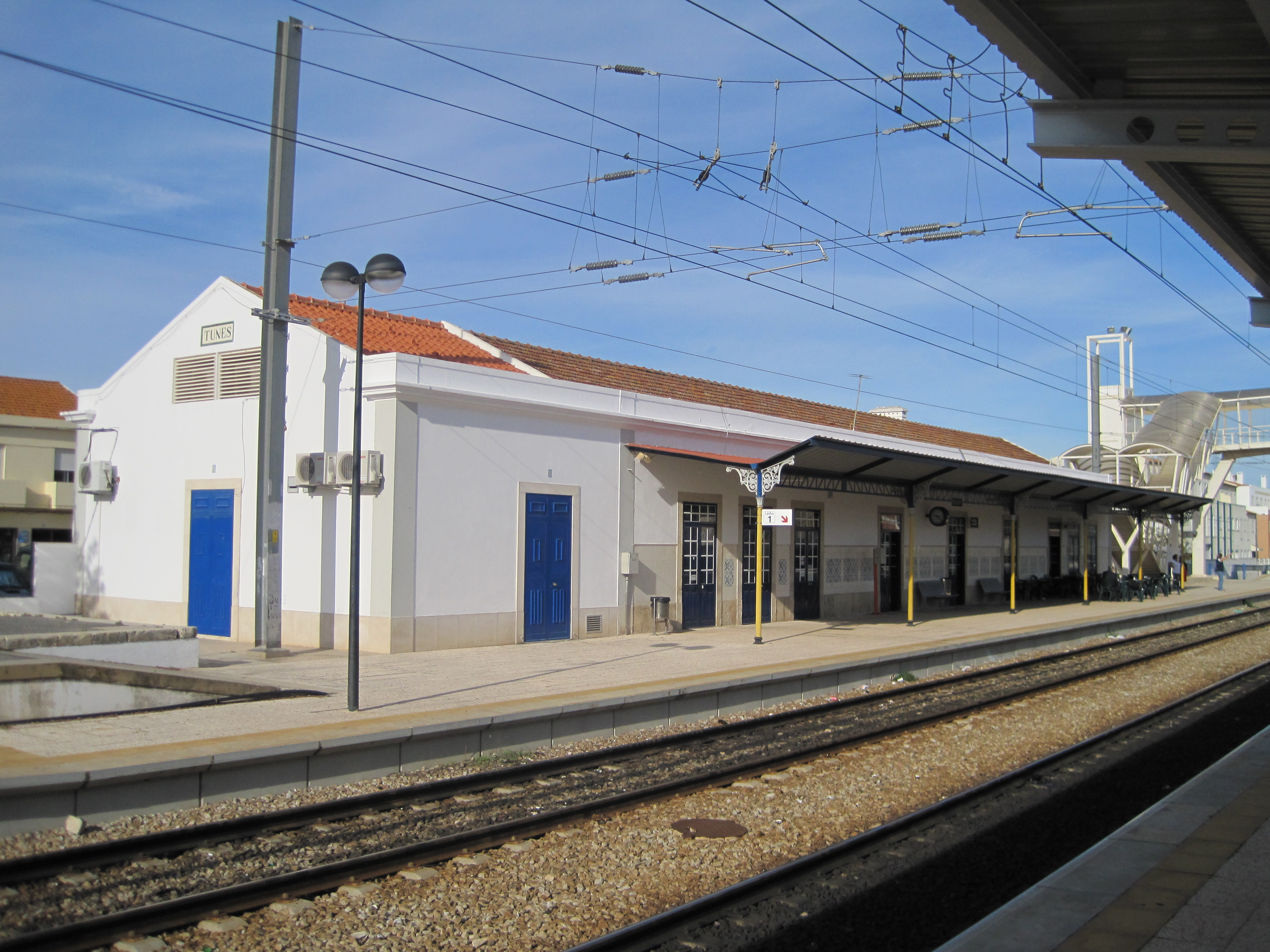

General information
- Location: Largo 1° de Dezembro, Tunes, 8365-235; Silves; Portugal
- Coordinates: 37°9′53.91″N 8°15′23.07″W
- Owner: Infraestruturas de Portugal
- Lines: Linha do Algarve; Linha do Sul
- Platforms: 4
- Train operators: Comboios de Portugal

History
- Opened: 1 July 1889; 137 years ago

Services
Preceding station	Comboios de Portugal	Following station
Albufeira-Ferreiras towards Faro	Alfa Pendular	Pinhal Novo towards Porto-Campanhã
Albufeira-Ferreiras towards Faro	Alfa Pendular	Santa Clara-Sabóia towards Porto-Campanhã
Albufeira-Ferreiras towards Faro	Intercidades	Messines-Alte towards Lisbon-Oriente
Albufeira-Ferreiras towards Faro	Regional	Algoz towards Lagos
Location

Tunes is a railway station on the Algarve Line, which serves Tunes, in the Silves municipality, Portugal. It opened on 1 July 1889, and is the junction of the Algarve and Southern lines.

== Service ==
As of May 2023, there are five trains to and from Lisbon every day; two Alfa Pendular and three Intercidades services.
