= Caima =

Caima may refer to:

- Caima River
- Caima (barangay) in Sipocot, Camarines Sur
- Caima (company) from Portugal
