= Vila Real Bridge =

Corgo Viaduct Viaduto do Corgo
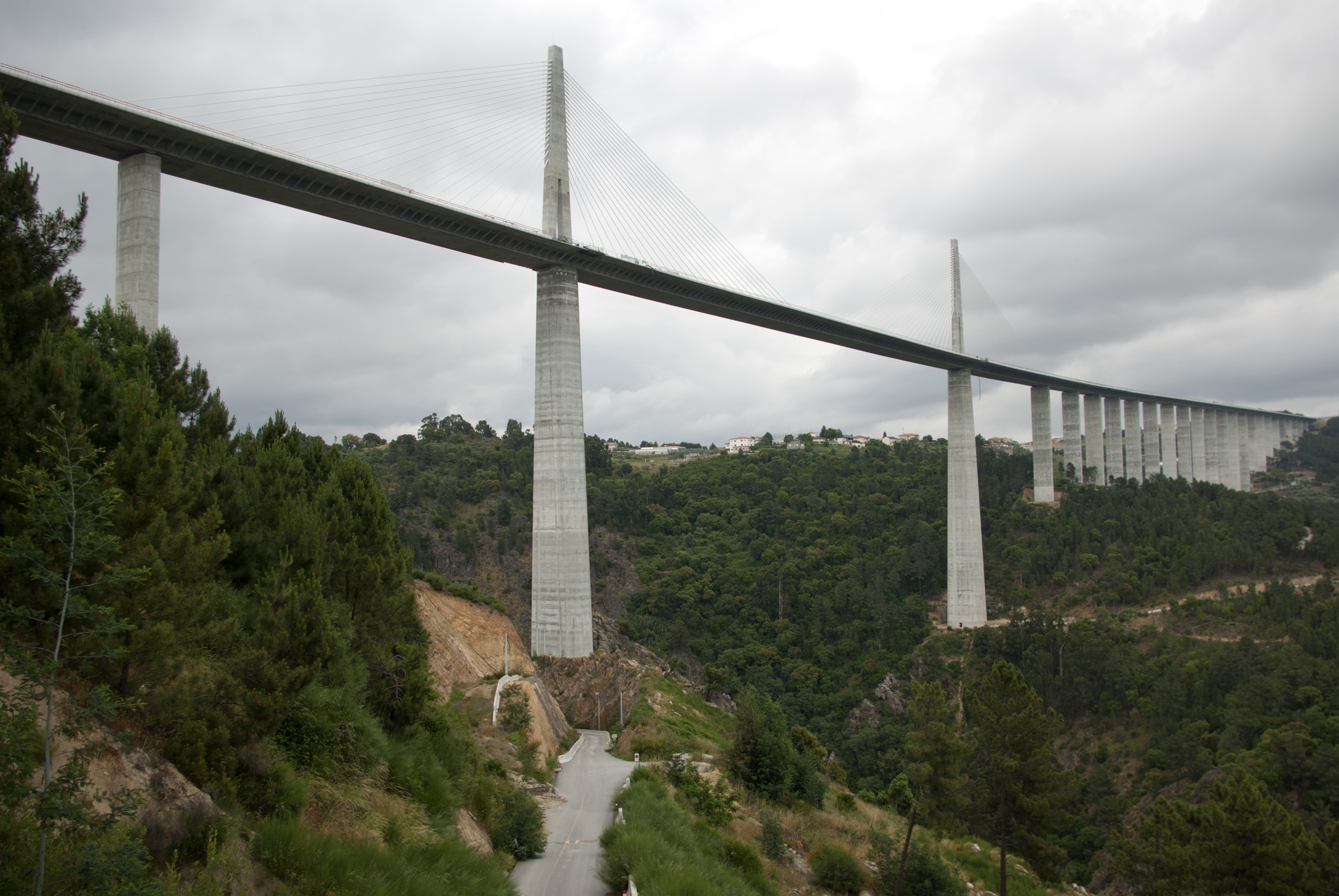
- Coordinates: 41.2783°N 7.7512°W
- Carries: A4 highway
- Crosses: Corgo River
- Locale: Vila Real District

Characteristics
- Total length: 2,796 metres (9,173 ft)
- Width: 28-metre-wide (92 ft)
- Height: 230 metres (750 ft)
- Longest span: 300 metres (980 ft)

History
- Construction end: 2013

Statistics
- Daily traffic: Vehicles only

The Corgo Viaduct (Portuguese: Viaduto do Corgo) is a viaduct in Portugal. It is located in the Vila Real District, crossing the Corgo River. It is part of the A4 highway. Vila Real Bridge has a concrete deck, with the 300 metres (980 ft) main span supported by two pylons. It carries four lanes of road traffic on its 28-metre-wide (92 ft) deck.

It has the highest deck, at about 230 metres (750 ft) above the Corgo River, among concrete-deck bridges cable-stayed in the central plain.

This bridge is ranked 56th highest in the world, 4th highest in Europe, and the highest and 5th longest in Portugal.
