= Alcantarilha River =

River of the Algarve, Portugal

Alcantarilha River Ribeiro de Enxurrada
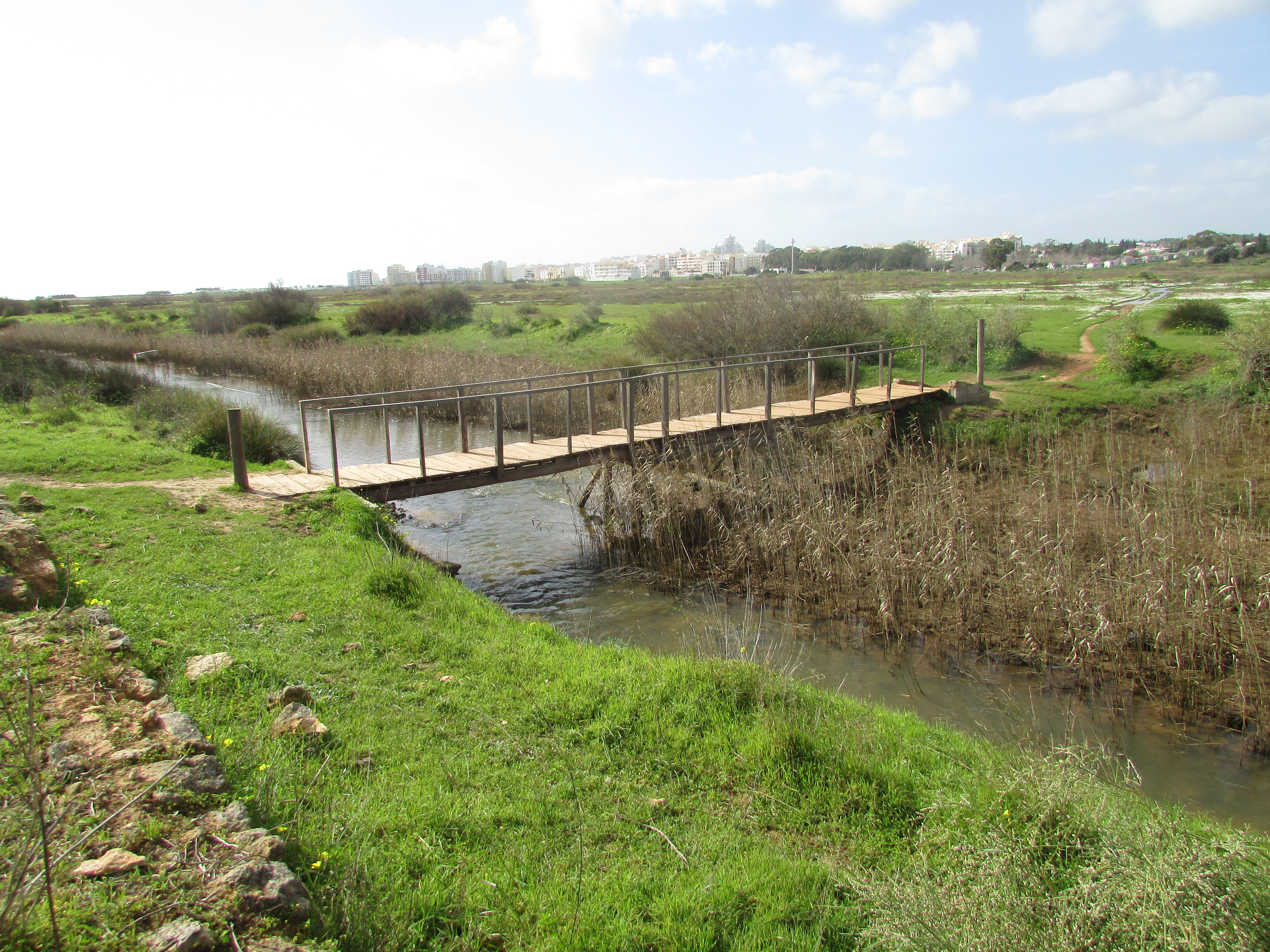
- Footbridge over the Alcantarilha river in the rivers saltmarshes

- Red Dot = Alcantarilha River mouth
- Native name: Ribeiro de Alcantarilha (Portuguese)

Location
- Country: Portugal
- Region: Algarve
- District: Faro
- Municipality: Silves

Physical characteristics
- Source
  - location: Miões, Tunes, Algarve
  - coordinates: 37°11′58.6″N 8°17′10.0″W
- Mouth: The south central coast of the Algarve into the Atlantic at Armação de Pêra
  - coordinates: 37.098646°N 8.351795°W
- Length: 12.2 mi (19.6 km), North east to South

The Alcantarilha River (Portuguese pronunciation: [alˌkɐ̃tɐˈɾiʎɐ]) is a small river in the south central region of the Algarve, Portugal. The river begins at the conflux of three tributary streams a little south of the village of Miões in the municipality of Silves. Downstream the river also has several further tributaries including the Algoz River (Ribeiro de Algoz). The river runs for a length of 12.2 miles (19.6 km) from its conflux to the mouth at the Atlantic Ocean in south central Algarve.

== Description ==
=== The Armação de Pêra wetlands ===
The river runs south towards the south coast and its mouth is at Armação de Pêra. At Armação de Pêra the river is the main tributary to an area of shallow salt marsh which over the years has been neglected and is polluted. Plans have been made to improve the environment in the near future as the wetlands are an important habitat for water fowl and a wintering and nesting site for a numerous species of birds. The wetland is also an important stopping point for thousands of migrating birds.
