= Corgo River =

River in northern Portugal

Coordinates: 41°09′10″N 7°46′26″W

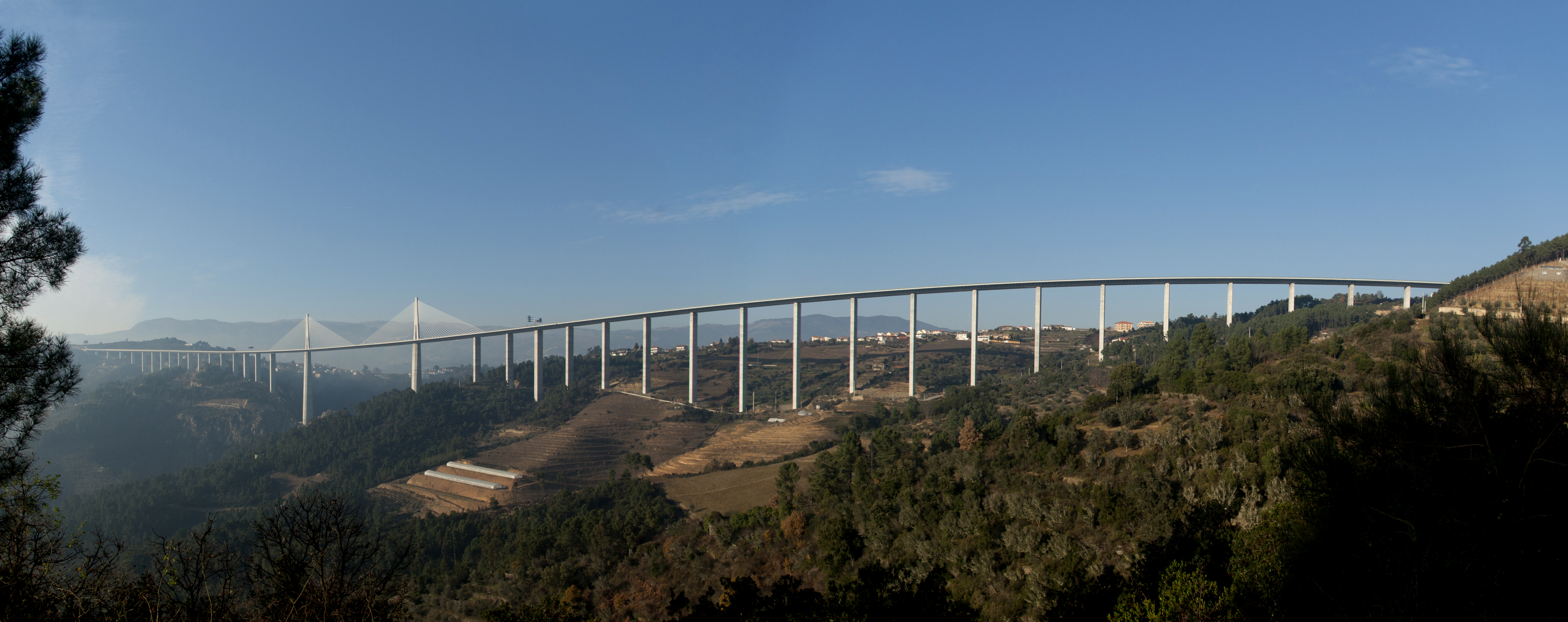
The Corgo River Viaduct

The Corgo River (Portuguese pronunciation: [ˈkɔɾɣu]) is a river in northern Portugal which flows through the settlement of Covelo and the city of Vila Real. It flows southwards into the Douro River, merging near Granja.

The Corgo River Viaduct carries the A4 motorway (Transmontana Highway) over the river. The cable-stayed bridge, opened in 2013, is ranked 56th highest in the world, 4th highest in Europe, the highest and 5th longest in Portugal.
