= Agadão River =

River in Aveiro, Portugal

Coordinates: 40°33′15″N 8°22′05″W

The Agadão River (Portuguese: Rio Agadão, pronounced [ˈʁi.u ɐɣɐˈðɐ̃w]) is a river in Portugal. The former freguesia of Belazaima do Chão is located on the left bank of the river.

== See also ==
- List of rivers in Portugal
