= Albufeira-Ferreiras railway station =

Railway station in Portugal

Albufeira-Ferreiras
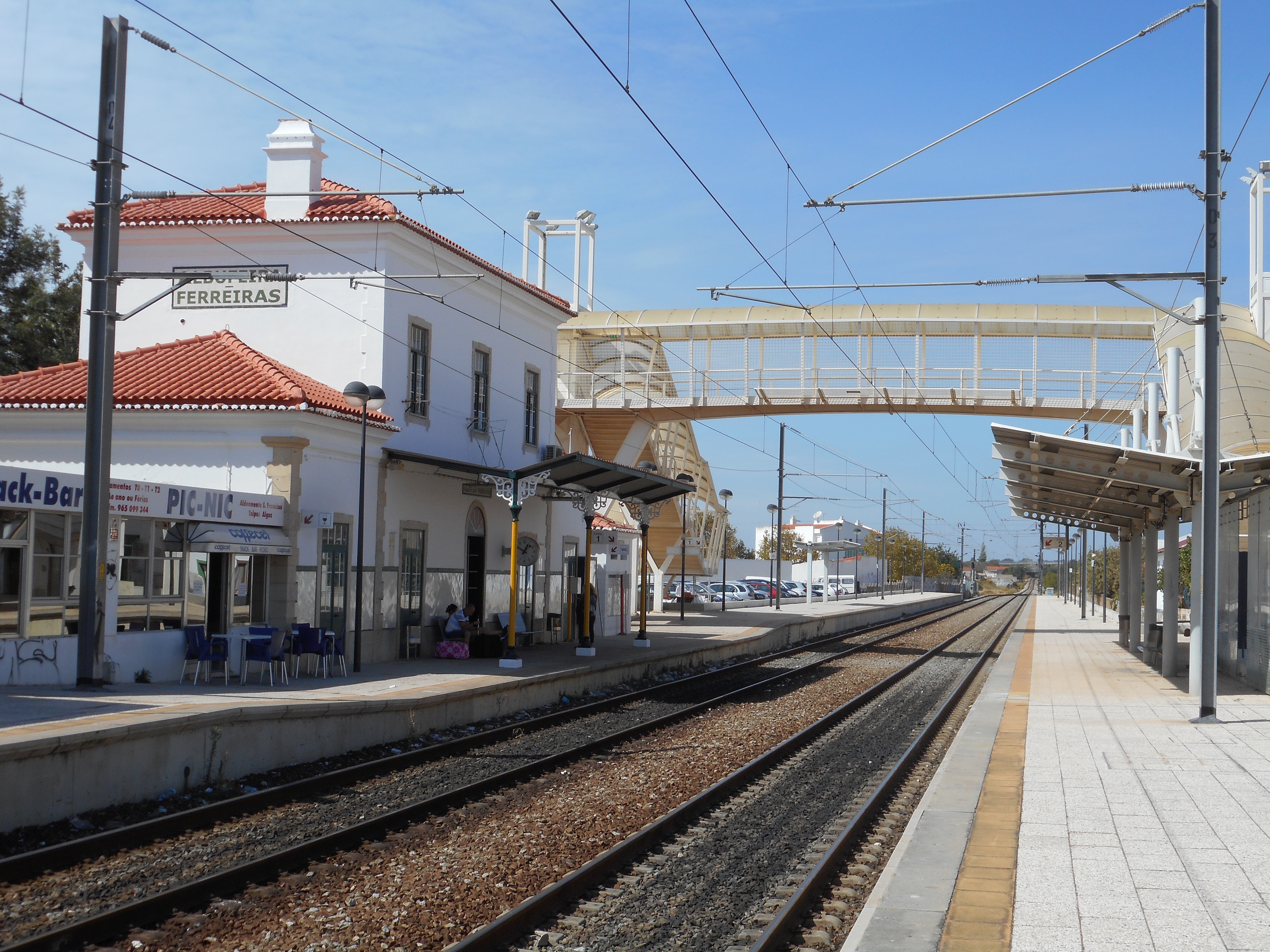
- Albufeira railway station and footbridge

General information
- Location: Ferreiras, Albufeira; Portugal
- Coordinates: 37.128601°N 8.233047°W
- Operator: Comboios de Portugal
- Line: Linha do Algarve
- Platforms: Two
- Tracks: Two

Construction
- Parking: Yes, free.
- Cycle facilities: Yes
- Accessible: Yes

History
- Opened: 1 July 1889

Services
Preceding station	Comboios de Portugal	Following station
Loulé towards Faro	Alfa Pendular	Tunes towards Porto-Campanhã
Loulé towards Faro	Intercidades	Tunes towards Lisbon-Oriente
Boliqueime towards Faro	Regional	Tunes towards Lagos
Location

The Albufeira-Ferreiras Station is the railway station for the city of Albufeira, Algarve, in Portugal. Situated in the civil parish of Ferreiras, in the north of the municipality of Albufeira. The station opened on 1 July 1889.

== Line ==
The station is on the Linha do Algarve which runs east to west across the Algarve from Lagos in the west to Vila Real de Santo António in the east, on the border with Spain. Part of the line, between Tunes and Faro through Albufeira, is electrified, using overhead catenary. The line east of Faro to Vila Real de Santo António, is not electrified, nor is the western section between Tunes and Lagos. A scheme to electrify the whole line was due to have been completed in 2023, but work is still far from complete.

== Train service and station facilities ==
Albufeira-Ferreiras is a stop for long-distance trains between Faro and Lisbon. As of August 2024, there are five trains to and from Lisbon every day; two Alfa Pendular and three Intercidades services. Extra trains occasionally run on summer weekends. Local trains on the Algarve line between Lagos and Vila Real de Santo António also stop at Albufeira - Ferreiras. These trains are irregular and infrequent, operated by two coach diesel trains. There are nine trains in each direction on weekdays, seven on Saturdays and six on Sundays and Holidays.

The station is for passengers only, there is no freight facility. There is a staffed ticket office and waiting room. A footbridge with a lift (elevator) connects the two platforms above the tracks. There are two café/bars at the station for refreshments.

== Connections into Albufeira town ==
Taxis are available at the station. The journey into town will cost (May 2024) about €11. Uber and Bolt vehicles are also available. A local bus leaves the railway station every thirty minutes from 0700 until 2100 (winter), 2300 in summer. Some buses go down into the old town area of Albufeira, others only as far as the main bus station, which is 1.5 km (almost a mile) from the town centre and main hotel areas. Two buses may needed to reach many areas of Albufeira. Official timetables (find routes 5 and 11) at https://vamusalgarve.pt/#/pt/albufeira/routes
