= Ave River =

River in northern Portugal

Coordinates: 41.3393°N 8.74811°W

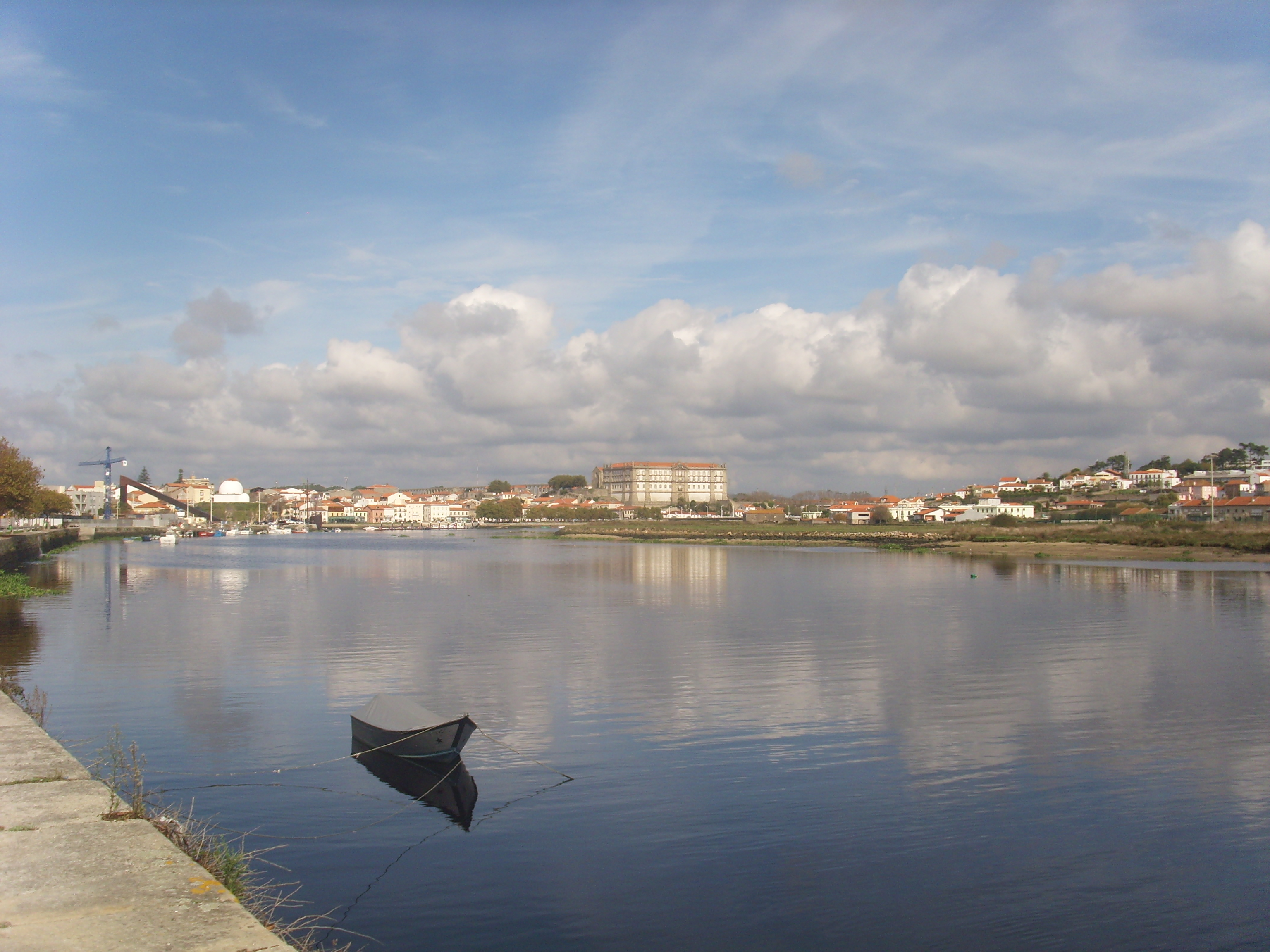
The Ave in Vila do Conde, near its mouth

Ave River (Portuguese: Rio Ave, pronounced [ˈʁi.u ˈavɨ]) is a river in Northern Portugal. It has its source in the Cabreira Mountain (Serra da Cabreira) in the Minho Region. In its course passes through the cities of Guimarães, Vizela, Santo Tirso, Trofa and Vila do Conde. The Vizela River and Este River (Portugal) flow into it. The Ave flows into the Atlantic Ocean in the city of Vila do Conde.
