= Fervença River =

River in northern Portugal

Coordinates: 41.7760091°N 6.7176395°W

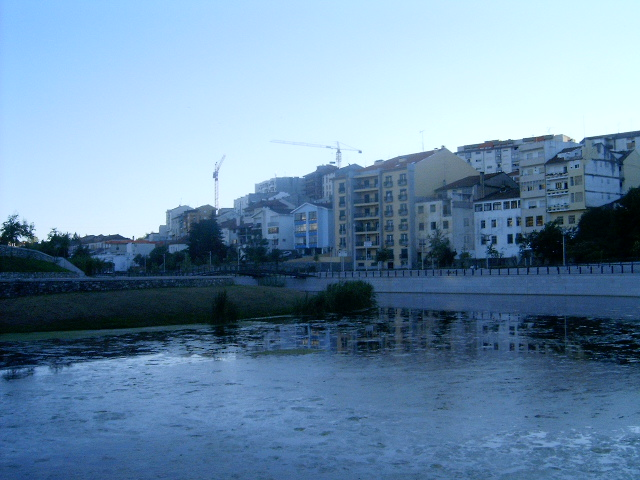
Fervença River

Fervença River (Portuguese: Rio Fervença, Portuguese pronunciation: [fɨɾˈvẽsɐ]) is a river in Portugal. It goes through Bragança.
