= Falacho River =

River of the Algarve, Portugal

- Confluence of the Falacho River and the Arada River
- Native name: Ribeiro do Falacho (Portuguese)

Location
- Country: Portugal
- Region: Algarve
- District: Faro
- Municipality: Silves

Physical characteristics
- Source
  - location: Algarve
- Source confluence
  - location: Arada River
  - coordinates: 37°10′44.4″N 8°28′06.6″W
- Mouth: Into the Atlantic at Portimão via the Arada River.

The Falacho River (Portuguese pronunciation: [fɐˈlaʃu]) is a small river in the Portuguese region of the Algarve and is a tributary of the Arade River with the river's confluence located west of the town of Silves.
