= Antuã River =

River in Aveiro, Portugal

Coordinates: 40.723900°N 8.601600°W

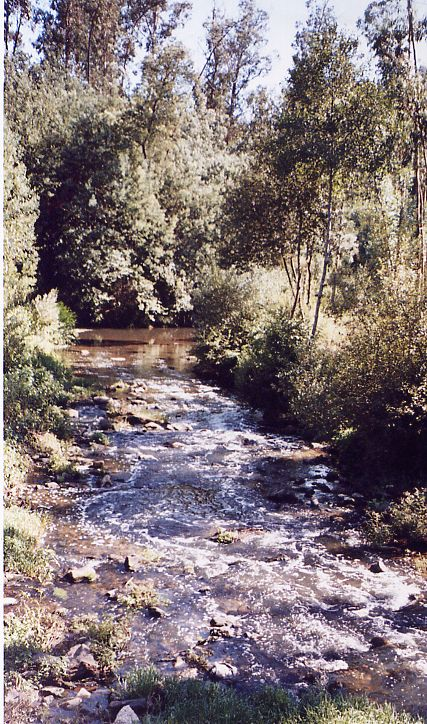
Antua River

Antuã (Portuguese pronunciation: [ɐ̃tuˈɐ̃]) is a Portuguese river, located in the Aveiro region. It is the most important tributary of the Ria de Aveiro after the Vouga River. Its name is linked to the former name of Estarreja: Antuão or Anterão. It has its source between Romariz and Fajões, near S. João da Madeira, and it ends west of Estarreja, on the waters of the Ria de Aveiro. The main towns near its banks are S. João da Madeira, Oliveira de Azeméis, and Estarreja. Its main tributary is the Ínsua. It has a total length of about 38 kilometres (24 mi).

In 2008, an assessment was completed on the river basin for water pollution. There was a recorded disruption of its freshwater system due to microplastics in water and sediments.
