= Este River (Portugal) =

River in northern Portugal

Coordinates: 41°22′15″N 8°42′19″W

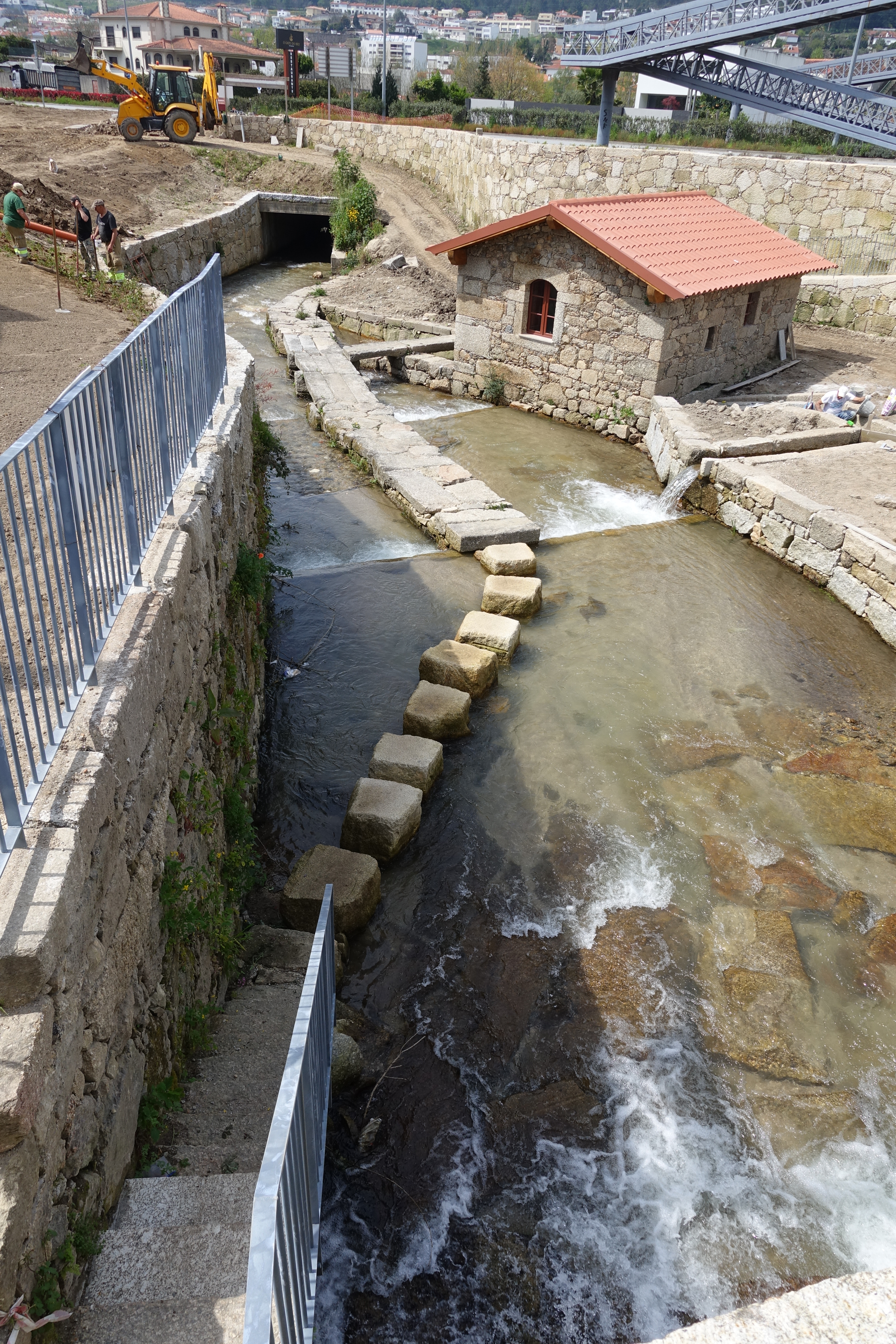
Este River in Braga

The Este River (in Portuguese Rio Este) is a river in Portugal. It flows into the Ave River.

The source of the river is in Este (São Pedro e São Mamede), Braga. Along its 45-kilometre (28 mi) course to the Ave River, it passes through Famalicão and Póvoa de Varzim.
