= Ul River =

River in India

Coordinates: 27°47′N 81°02′E

The Ul river originates in the Kheri district of Uttar Pradesh state in India.

== Origin ==
The Ul rises in the Dhaka Chat forest and swamps located in the south-east of pargana Puranpur in Pilibhit district. It enters the Kheri district from the north-west forming the boundary of pargana Bhira of Kheri district.
