= Torre River, Portugal =

River of the Algarve, Portugal

Torre River
- Red Dot = Torre River at the Alvor Estuary
- Native name: Ribeiro da Torre (Portuguese)

Location
- Country: Portugal
- Region: Algarve
- District: Faro

Physical characteristics
- Source: Conflux of small streams
  - location: Serra de Monchique, Algarve
  - coordinates: 37°18′18.0″N 8°36′02.5″W
- Mouth: Alvor Estuary
  - location: Alvor (Portimão), Algarve, Portugal
  - coordinates: 37°09′02.2″N 8°35′26.2″W

The Torre River (Portuguese pronunciation: [ˈtoʁɨ]) is a small river in the south west Algarve, Portugal. The rivers headwater sources are a number of small streams and brooks rising from springs across the Serra de Monchique. The river runs for around 11.0 kilometres (6.8 mi) from these sources southwards towards the town of Portimão where it discharges into the Alvor Estuary close to the coastal village of Alvor.
