= Boina River =

River of the Algarve, Portugal

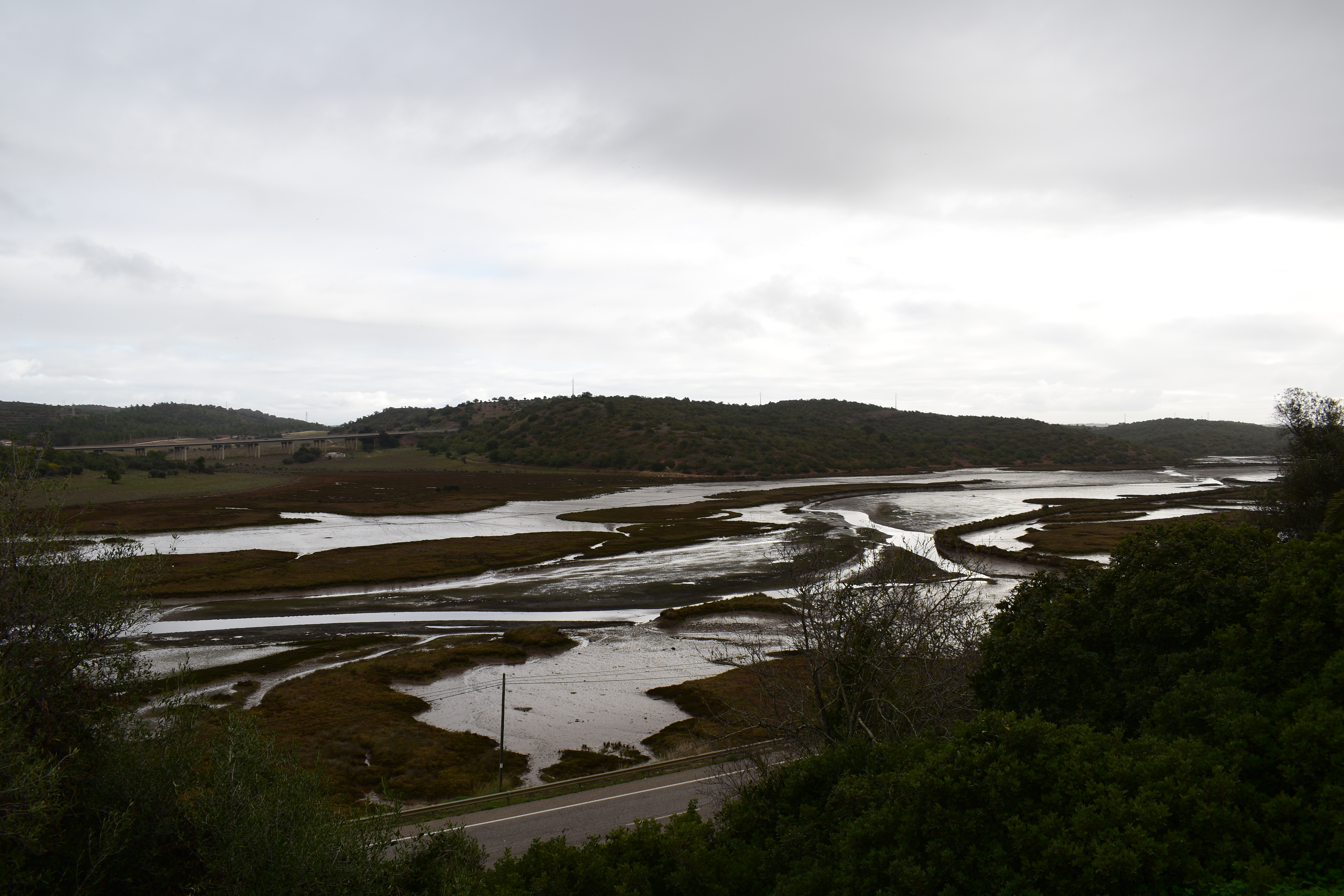

- Location of the confluence (Boina estuary) in Portugal

Location
- Country: Portugal
- Region: Algarve
- District: Faro
- Municipality: Silves

Physical characteristics
- Source
  - location: Serra de Monchique, Algarve
  - coordinates: 37°09′13.4″N 8°15′55.5″W
- Source confluence
  - location: Boina estuary
  - coordinates: 37°10′14.4″N 8°31′49.4″W
- Mouth: Boina estuary, south west coast of the Algarve into the Atlantic at Portimão via the Arade River

The Boina River (Portuguese pronunciation: [ˈbɔjnɐ]) is a small river in the south west Algarve, Portugal. It is a tributary of the Arade River which it has a conflux at the Boina Estuary 6.8 kilometres (4.2 mi) north of the mouth of the Arade at the town of Portimão.

== Description ==
The Boina River runs for a distance of 30.0 kilometres (18.6 mi) from its headwater sources which are a number of small streams and brooks rising from springs across the Serra de Monchique. The rivers confluence is with the Arade River forming the western arm of the Arade estuary and is known as the Boina estuary. The head of the estuary is near the village of Arge.
