= Boco River =

River in Aveiro, Portugal

Coordinates: 40.6368°N 8.6894°W

The Boco (Portuguese: Rio Boco, pronounced [ˈʁi.u ˈβoku]) is a river in Portugal. It flows into the Ria de Aveiro at the Aveiro Lagoon through the Ílhavo Channel (Portuguese: Canal de Ílhavo).

== See also ==
- List of rivers of Portugal
