= Vizela River =

River in northern Portugal

Coordinates: 41.3629°N 8.4319°W

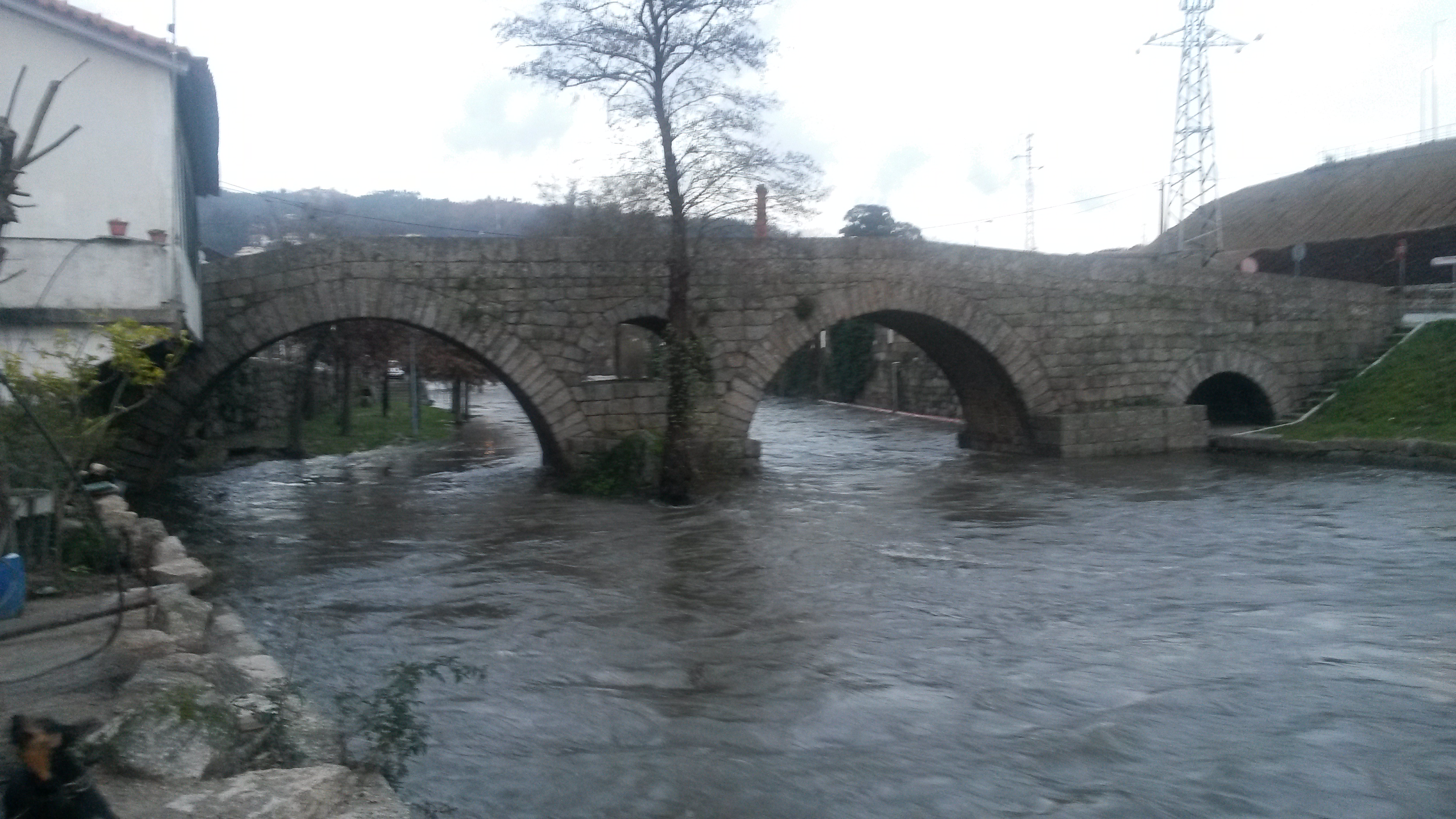
Overflow in the Vizela River

Vizela River (Portuguese pronunciation: [viˈzɛlɐ]) is a river in Portugal. It flows into Ave River and it is named after the city of Vizela.
