= Isna River =

River in central Portugal

Coordinates: 39°43′39″N 8°13′16″W

Isna River (Portuguese: Rio Isna, Portuguese pronunciation: [ˈiʒnɐ]) is a river in Portugal. It is 45.5 kilometres (28.3 mi) long. The river's source begins South of Casalinho and then passes South West past the villages/towns of Atalaia, Cardal Pequeno, Fernandaires and Trisio before it leads into the Zêzere River.
