= Caima River =

River in northern Portugal

Coordinates: 40.6736°N 8.4463°W

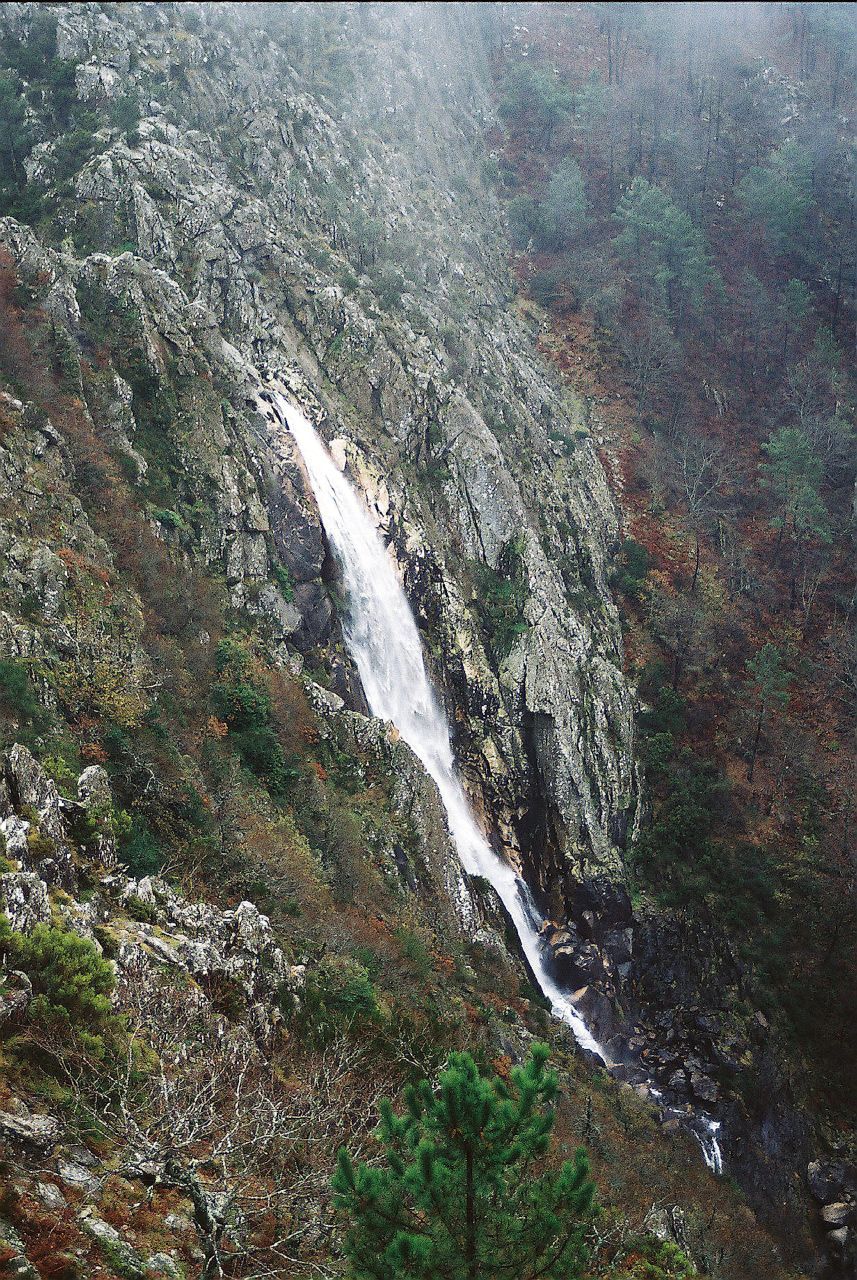

Location
- Country: Portugal

Physical characteristics
- Source
  - location: Arouca Municipality
- Mouth
  - location: Vouga River
- Basin size: 196 square kilometres (76 sq mi)

The Caima (Portuguese pronunciation: [ˈkajmɐ]) is a river in north-central Portugal. Its source is in Arouca Municipality. Its basin contains a number of abandoned mines (including for lead, copper, silver) that have led to heavy metal contamination of the river.
