= Algoz e Tunes =

- Civil parish
- Location in Portugal
- Coordinates: 37.164°N 8.303°W
- Country: Portugal
- Region: Algarve
- Intermunic. comm.: Algarve
- District: Faro
- Municipality: Silves

Area
  - Total: 44.89 km^{2} (17.33 sq mi)

Population (2011)
  - Total: 6,491
  - Density: 144.6/km^{2} (374.5/sq mi)
- Time zone: UTC+00:00 (WET)
  - Summer (DST): UTC+01:00 (WEST)

Algoz e Tunes is a civil parish in the municipality of Silves, Portugal. It was formed in 2013 by the merger of the former parishes Algoz and Tunes. The population in 2011 was 6,491, in an area of 44.89 km².
