= Vouga River =

River in northern Portugal

Coordinates: 40.683°N 8.667°W

Vouga
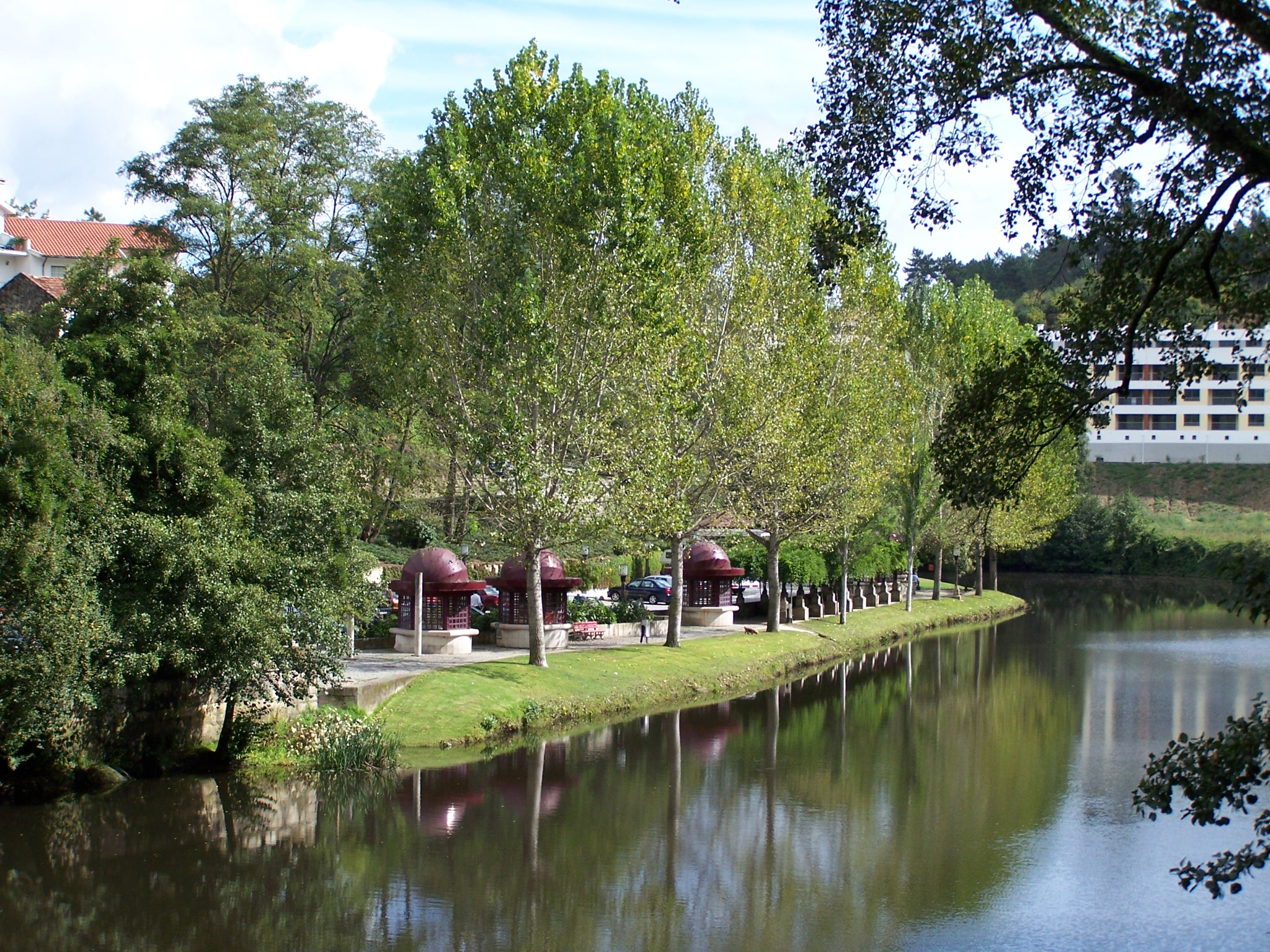

Location
- Country: Portugal

Physical characteristics
- Source: Chafariz da Lapa
  - location: Serra da Lapa, Sernancelhe, Viseu, Portugal
- Mouth
  - location: Atlantic Ocean at Aveiro, Portugal
- Length: 148 km (92 mi)
- Basin size: 3,635 km^{2} (1,403 sq mi)

Basin features
- Tributaries
  - right: Caima

Vouga River (European Portuguese pronunciation: [ˈvow.ɣɐ]) is a river in the Centro Region of Portugal. The source of the Vouga is the Chafariz da Lapa, at an elevation of 864 metres (2,835 ft), in the parish of Quintela, municipality of Sernancelhe, Viseu District. The course of the river ends in the Atlantic Ocean, in the form of a ria, the Ria de Aveiro.

== Tributaries ==
- Águeda (left bank)
- Caima (right bank)
- Sul (right bank)
- Teixeira (right bank)

== Environment ==
Cacia pulp and paper mill effluent, one of the major polluting sources of the Vouga River and Aveiro Lagoon, is discharged into the Aveiro coastal area. The area has an unpleasant smell due to the effluent.
