= Tunes (Silves) =

- Civil parish
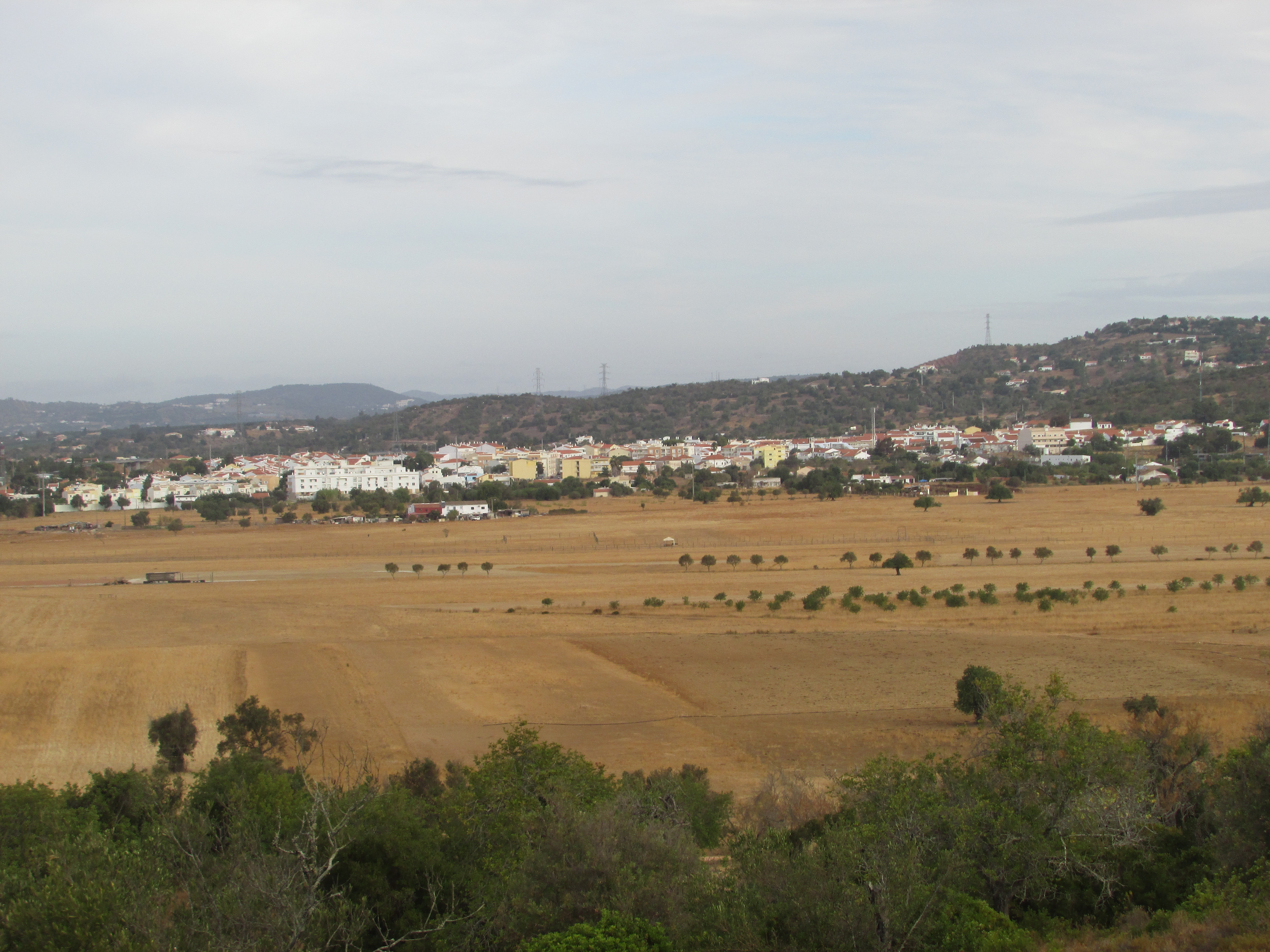
- Vista of Tunes from the south

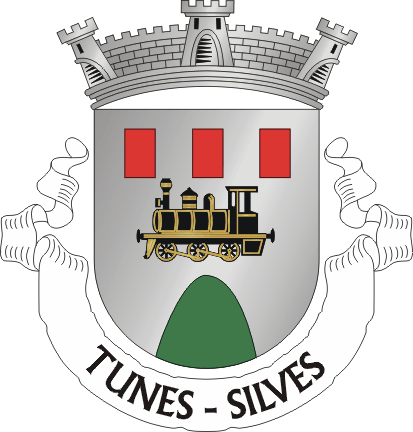
- Coat of arms

- Location in Portugal
- Coordinates: 37°9′59″N 8°15′37″W
- Country: Portugal
- Region: Algarve
- Intermunic. comm.: Algarve
- District: Faro
- Municipality: Silves
- Disbanded: 2013

Area
  - Total: 12.8 km^{2} (4.9 sq mi)
- Elevation: 66 m (217 ft)

Population (2001)
  - Total: 2,002
  - Density: 156/km^{2} (405/sq mi)
- Time zone: UTC+00:00 (WET)
  - Summer (DST): UTC+01:00 (WEST)
- Postal code: 8365-235
- Area code: 282
- Website: http://www.jf-tunes.com

Tunes is a village in the civil parish of Algoz e Tunes, in the municipality of Silves, in Algarve region, Portugal. It was the seat of its own civil parish until 2013 when the parish of Tunes merged into the new parish of Algoz e Tunes. In 2001 there were 2002 inhabitants, in an area of approximately 12.13 square kilometres (4.68 mi^{2}): there were 167 residents per kilometre square. Tunes is an important railway hub in southern Portugal.

== History ==
The opinion that persists around the toponymic name of the area, Tunes, is that it was so named for the number of colonists from north Africa, primarily from Tunis. Those who believe in this origin site the medieval French marigold (Tagetes patula) flower of Tunes, a herbaceous plant similar to the carnation (with cut petals and yellow flower) and common in Tunes, Portugal as well as in Tunisia.

The civil parish was created on 4 October 1985, under Decree-law 130/85, making it the youngest of the parishes of Silves. The settlement developed primarily around the junction of various rail-lines that connected Lisbon to the Algarve.

In the 19th century, the locality was dominated by a few agricultural settlers who dedicated themselves to wine production. The first barrios began to appear after the railway opened in Gateiras. What was planned initially was a station would be constructed in Algoz, near the village of Tunes. But, owing to the slope of the hills, the construction of the station was differed to several kilometres to the east. The population was composed primarily of workers for the railway. On 21 February 1889, the first train passed through Tunes on the Lisbon-Faro line. It was on the same line, specifically the Tunes-Lagos link, that the last steam-powered train was used in the Algarve (in 1972).

It was also in 1972 that the first thermoelectric plant was inaugurated in the community.

The economic changes in the country over time transformed the civil parish from one of agricultural and industry to a more tourist-oriented speciality.

== Geography ==
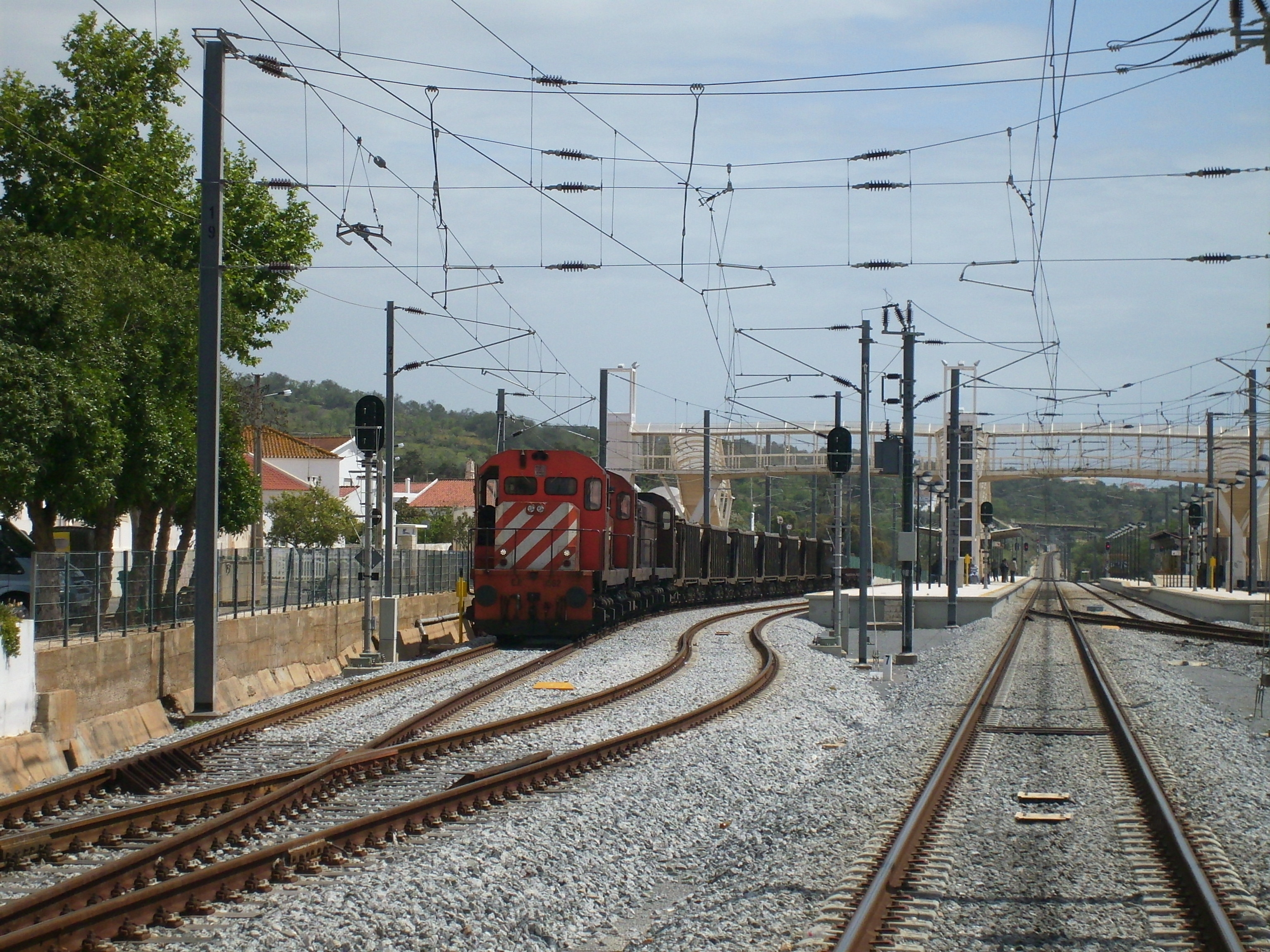
A locomotive along the Tunes railway junction

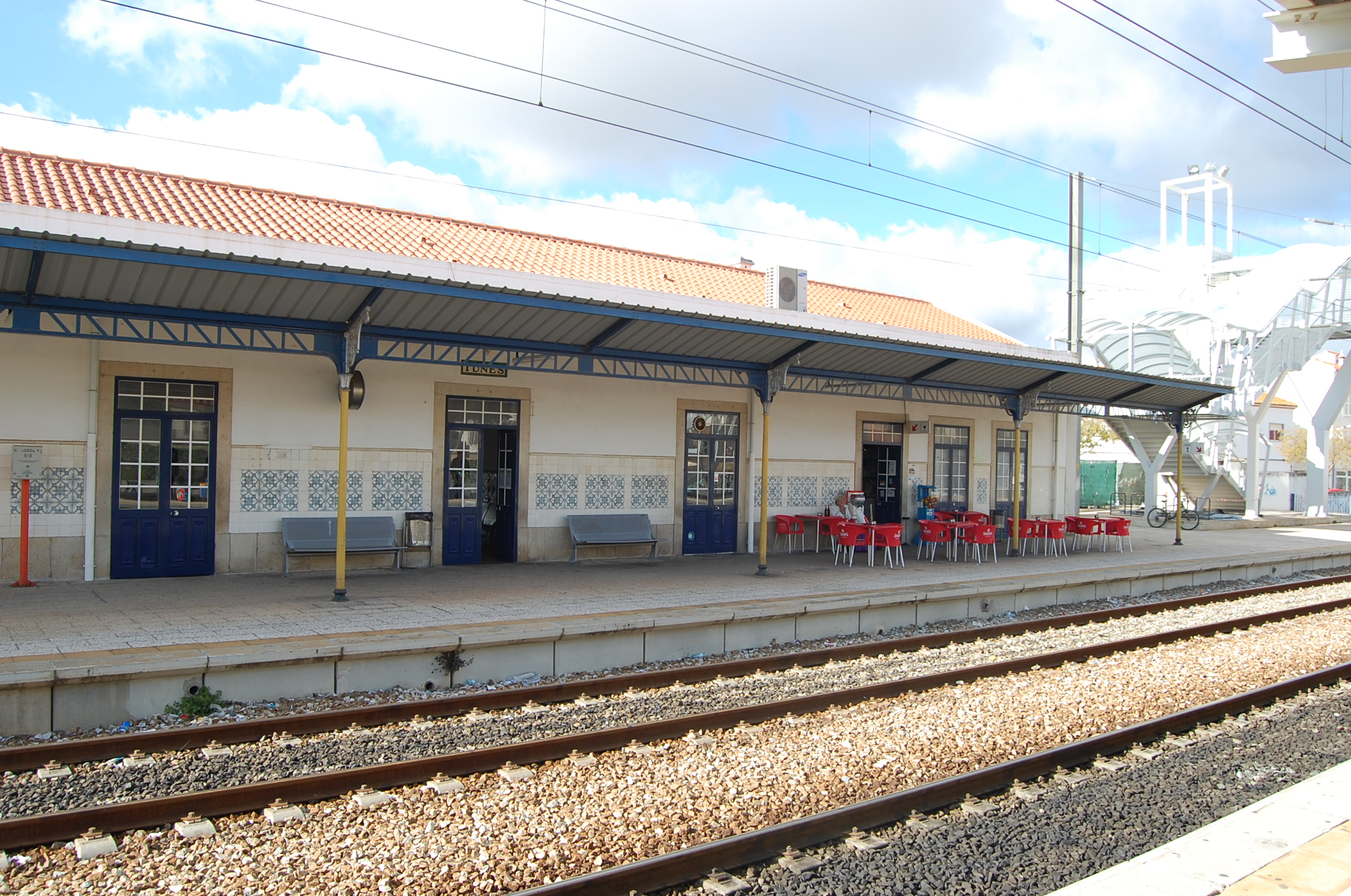
Tunes Railway station

The parish is located 29.7 kilometres (18.5 mi) east of the main centre of Silves and, approximately 245 kilometres (152 mi) south-southeast of Lisbon. It contains the localities Amêndoais, Assumadas, Canais da Silva, Cortezães, Gateiras, Guiné, Poço da Figueira and Tunes.

The town is most noted for a train station which is an important national transport hub.

== Architecture ==
=== Civic ===
- Primary School of Tunes (Portuguese: Escola primária de Tunes)
- Railway Station of Tunes (Portuguese: Estação Ferroviária de Tunes)

== Notable citizens ==
- Diogo do Guiné, who was accused of several crimes, escaped police forces in 1833, and refuged in a cave in the Cerro do Guiné. No one would attempt to capture Diogo, since no one could enter the caverns, fearful of other bandits who lived there, and resulting in the name Diogo do Guiné.
- Hermínio da Palma Inácio (Ferragudo, Lagoa 29 January 1922 - Lisbon, 14 July 2009), a native of Tunes, was known for his participation in sabotage plots against the regime of António Oliveira de Salazar. This included the hijacking of a TAP Sud Aviation Caravelle, en route from Casablanca to Lisbon, in 1961. He was a founder of the LUAR – Liga de União Revolucionária (League of Revolutionary Union). In 1995, he was posthumously awarded the Order of Liberty by Portuguese President Mário Soares.
