= Culture of Somerset =

Somerset is a county in the south west of England. It has a varied cultural tradition ranging from the Arthurian legends to The Wurzels, a band specialising in Scrumpy and Western music.

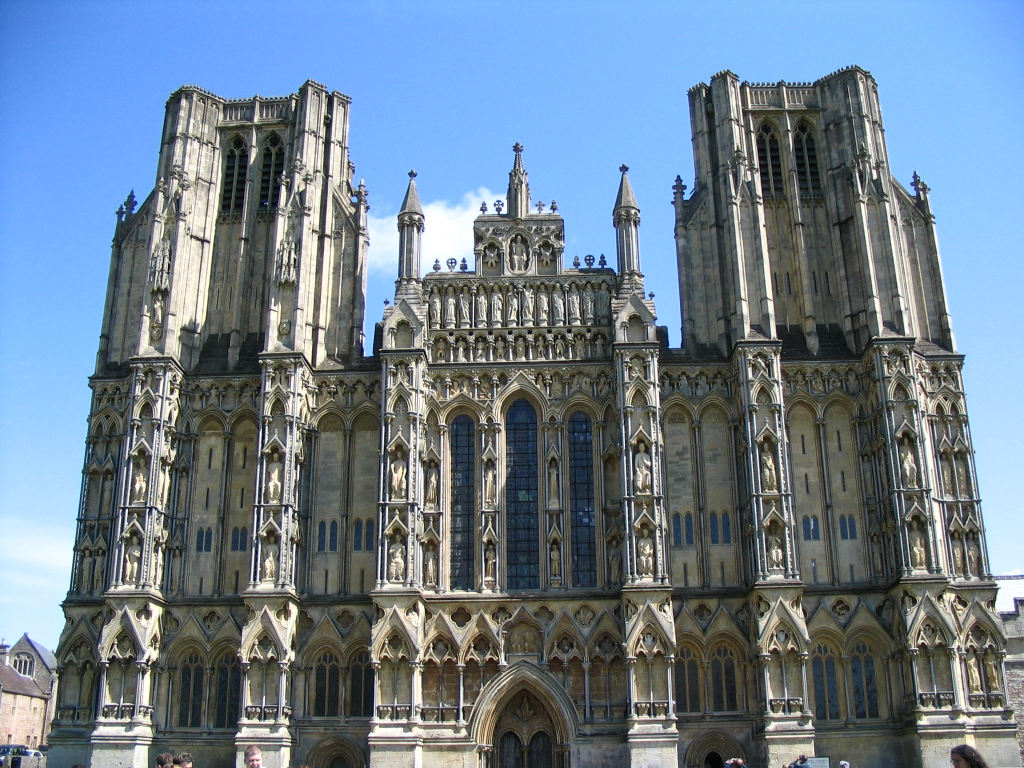
The west front of Wells Cathedral

== Art, music, film and literature ==
Traditional folk music, both song and dance, was important in Somerset's agrarian communities. Somerset songs were collected by Cecil Sharp and incorporated into a number of works including Holst's A Somerset Rhapsody. Halsway Manor near Williton is an international centre for folk music. The tradition continues today with groups such as The Wurzels, who specialise in Scrumpy and Western music. The number of Morris dance sides declined drastically following the First World War, but saw a resurgence during the 1950s, and Morris dancing is now a common sight at events throughout the summer.

Wordsworth and Coleridge wrote while staying in Coleridge Cottage, Nether Stowey. The writer Evelyn Waugh spent his last years in the village of Combe Florey. The novelist John Cowper Powys (1872–1963) lived in the Somerset village of Montacute from 1885 until 1894 and his novels Wood and Stone (1915) and A Glastonbury Romance (1932) are set in Somerset. His brothers, T. F. Powys and Llewelyn Powys, were also successful writers.

Many traditional rural trades such as basket making have survived, and many other crafts such as jewelry, leatherwork and pottery can be found at studios around the county.

An annual competition for the Bard of Bath aims to find Bath's best poet, singer or storyteller. The Bard uses the title to develop artistic projects in the area and leads evening bardic walks around the city. The title resurrects an Iron-Age Celtic Druid tradition where Druids were the law-makers, judges and ceremonial leaders, Ovates were mediums, healers and prophets and Bards were poets, musicians and history-keepers. All of them held high status and a place in mystical/religious circles.

== Theatres ==
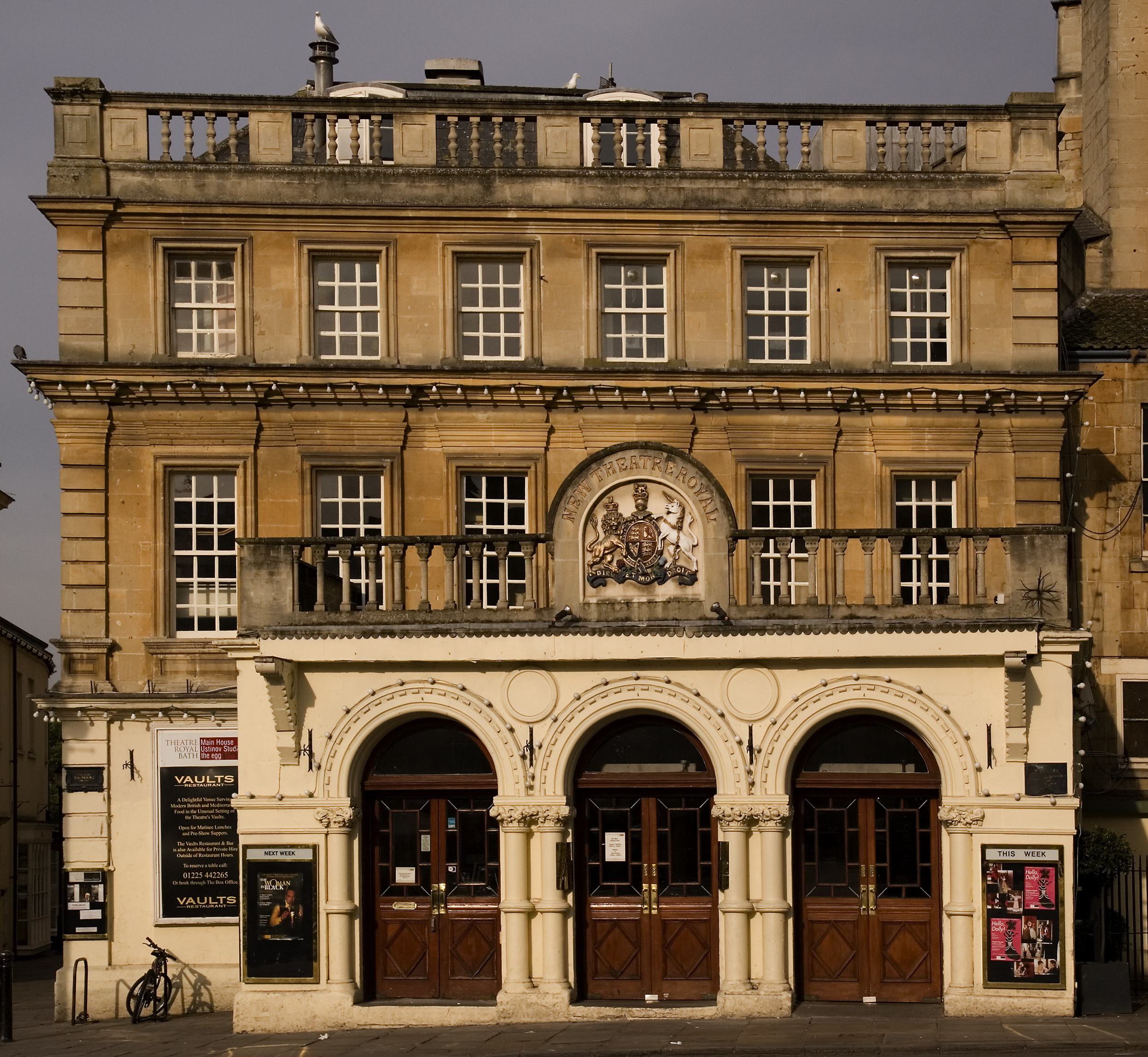
Theatre Royal, Bath

Bath has the greatest number of theatres in the county. The oldest is the Theatre Royal which was built in 1720 by Thomas Greenway, and was Beau Nash's first house: The theatre, along with the neighbouring Garrick's Head public house, is a Grade II* listed building and is considered a prime example of Georgian architecture. The auditorium has tiers of ornate plasterwork, with sumptuous red and gilt decoration, and a majestic trompe l'oeil ceiling and glittering chandelier. It was extensively renovated in 1982, and refurbished in 1999 and now provides a 900-seat auditorium. The Ustinov Studio, a studio theatre is the Theatre Royal's second space, built in 1997 at the rear of the building on Monmouth Street. It is named after the actor Peter Ustinov. It is the home of Britain's largest annual international festival of adult puppetry, and a venue for an eclectic range of drama, dance and classical music. In 2006 it closed for a £1.5million, 15-month refurbishment undertaken by Haworth Tompkins. Also connected to the Theatre Royal is the egg which was built specifically for the use of young people. It was converted from a former cinema by architects Haworth Tompkins. The Grade II listed Victorian building houses the eponymous 'egg'-shaped auditorium, around which an arts cafe, rooftop rehearsal space and basement technical workshop are arranged. The idea was supported by the children's author Bel Mooney. It opened in October 2005. In 2007, the Peter Hall Company made use of the space in order to stage a production of George Orwell's Animal Farm. The auditorium is unique in the UK enabling both fully day-lit or blacked out theatre and is usable end-on, in the round, flat floor and traverse.

In 2004, the Next Stage Theatre Company took possession of a grade II listed building in Bath originally built as a Congregational hall in 1797, which had been used by The People's Mission until 1998, and began building work to convert it into the Mission Theatre. It is now owned by the Bath and North East Somerset Council, which has granted a lease to occupy and use the building as a 100-seat theatre, arts centre and multi-purpose facility for community activities. On the first floor there is a small 30-seat theatre (The Theatre Upstairs) and a Bistro open during the day and providing meals before performances in the theatre. The Rondo Theatre, which was established in 1989, is located in the former church hall of St. Saviours Church, Larkhall. The building, purchased in 1976 by Doreen and Wilf Williams, has been converted into a 105-seat theatre. The facility received extensive renovations and upgrades after the receipt of lottery grants in 1996 and 2003.

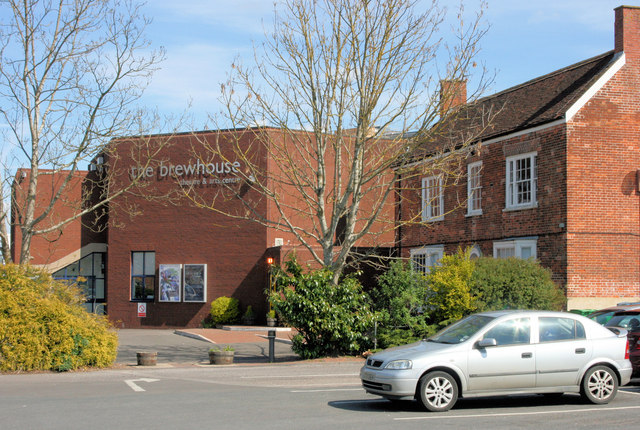
Brewhouse Theatre, Taunton

The Blakehay Theatre in Weston-super-Mare was originally built in 1850 as Wadham Street Baptist Church. During World War II the theatre was hit by incendiary bombs. After the war it was rebuilt inside the original Victorian shell. In 1985 the building ceased to be a place of worship. In 1986 the Blakehay was saved from demolition by the Weston-super-Mare Building Trust and run by the Civic Society. In September 2004 Weston Town Council purchased the theatre for £195,000. Also in Weston is The Playhouse a 664-seat theatre that hosts a largely entertainment based programme of shows all year round including opera, ballet, comedy, music and pantomime performances. In 1946, an old market building, designed by local architect Hans Price, was converted into a 500-seat theatre. For the next 18 years this theatre, The Playhouse, provided the town with a great variety of entertainment and played host to stars including Frankie Howerd, Bob Monkhouse and Ken Dodd. On 21 August 1964, a fire destroyed most of the theatre and the unsafe structure had to be demolished. In 1969, at a cost of £230,000 a new theatre opened and has been in continuous use ever since. The stage measures 59 feet (18 m) by 28 feet (9 m) and can be extended by covering the orchestra pit.

The Brewhouse Theatre on the banks of the River Tone in Taunton, opened in March 1977, and now offers a 350-seat auditorium and supporting studio and exhibition spaces. Strode Theatre in Street is part of Strode College and provides rehearsal and drama space for students from the college. It opened on 5 October 1963 with a performance by the Bournemouth Symphony Orchestra.

There are two theatres in Frome: The Memorial Theatre was built in 1924 in memory of the fallen of the First World War, whilst the 240-seat Merlin Theatre is part of the Community College campus.

== Festivals ==
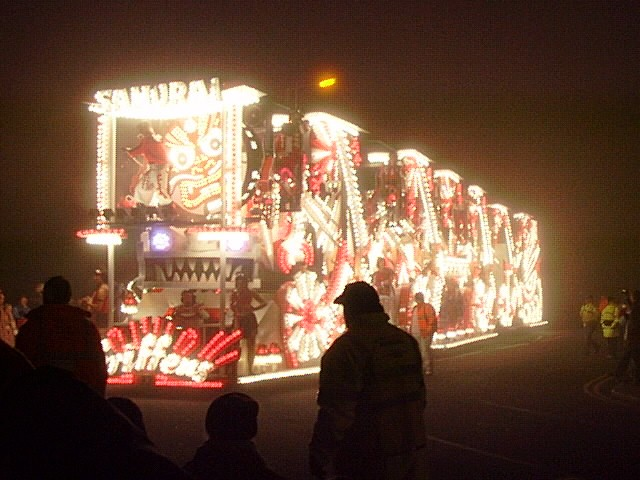
"Samurai" by Griffens CC, at Burnham on Sea Carnival 2006, part of the West Country Carnival circuit

The Glastonbury Festival of Contemporary Performing Arts takes place most years in Pilton, near Shepton Mallet, attracting over 170,000 music and culture lovers and entertainers from around the world. The Big Green Gathering was held in Somerset on five occasions between 2002 and 2007.

The annual Bath Literature Festival is one of several local festivals in the county which include the Frome Festival and the Trowbridge Village Pump Festival, which, despite its name, is held at Farleigh Hungerford in Somerset.

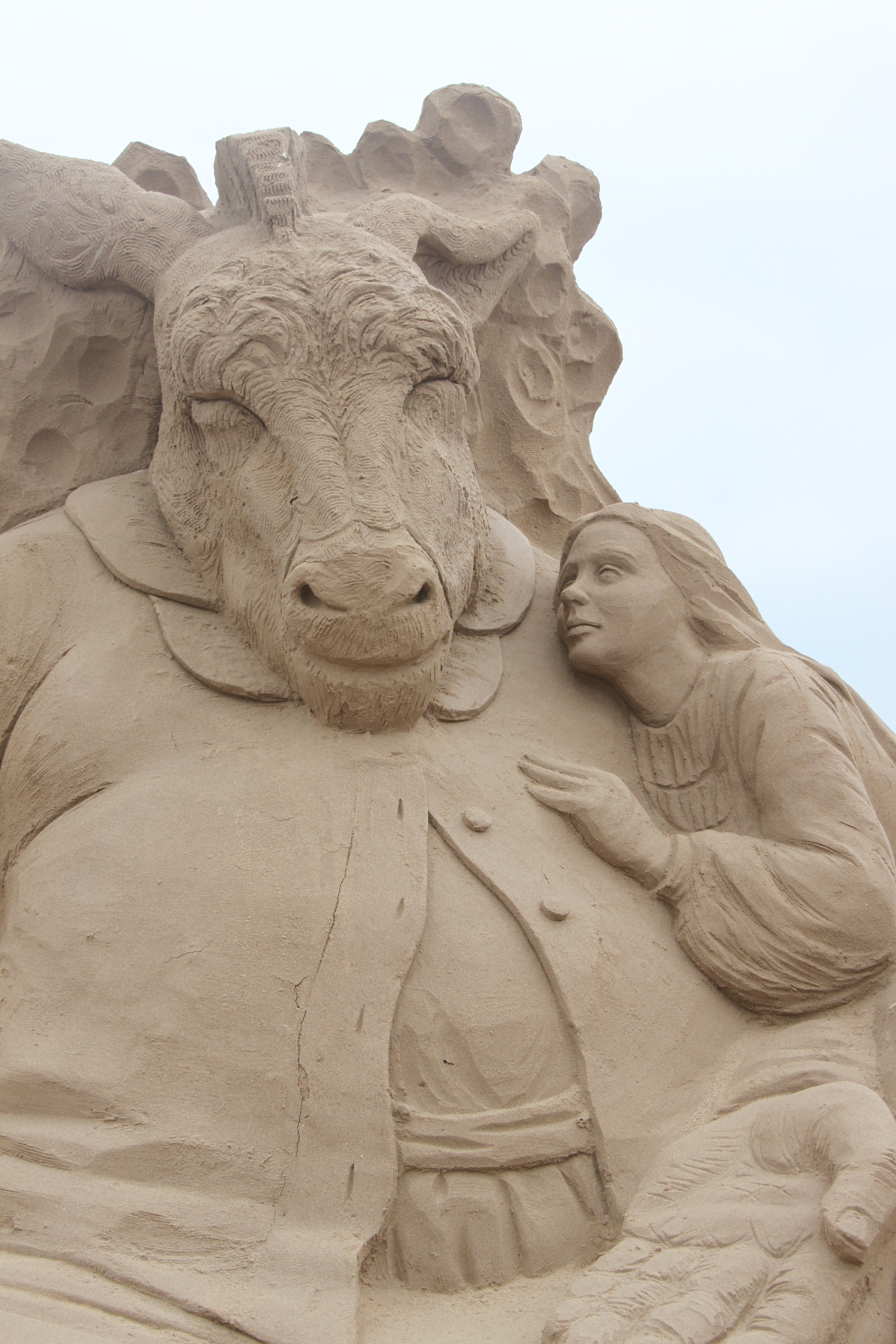
Sand Sculpture at Weston-super-Mare Sand Sculpture Festival of A Midsummer Nights Dream

The annual circuit of West Country Carnivals is held in a variety of Somerset towns during the autumn, forming a major regional festival, and the largest Festival of Lights in Europe. It is an annual celebration featuring a parade of illuminated floats (termed "carts" locally), in the English West Country. The celebration dates back to the Gunpowder Plot of 1605. The series of parades in each town now form a major regional festival. Some carts cost in excess of £20,000 to build and are the result of thousands of man hours work throughout the year. The event's purpose, as it has always been from the start, is to raise thousands of pounds for local charities from money collection carts in the two-hour procession. In several villages Punkie Night is celebrated each October.

Many villages had Friendly Societies or Clubs between the late 18th and early 20th centuries. The use of Friendly Society Brasses as emblems was particularly prevalent in Somerset and the surrounding counties.

The Weston-super-Mare Sand Sculpture Festival is held annually on the beach at Weston-super-Mare. The Bridgwater Science Festival is held each year in the Town Hall and other venues in Bridgwater.

== Legends and religion ==
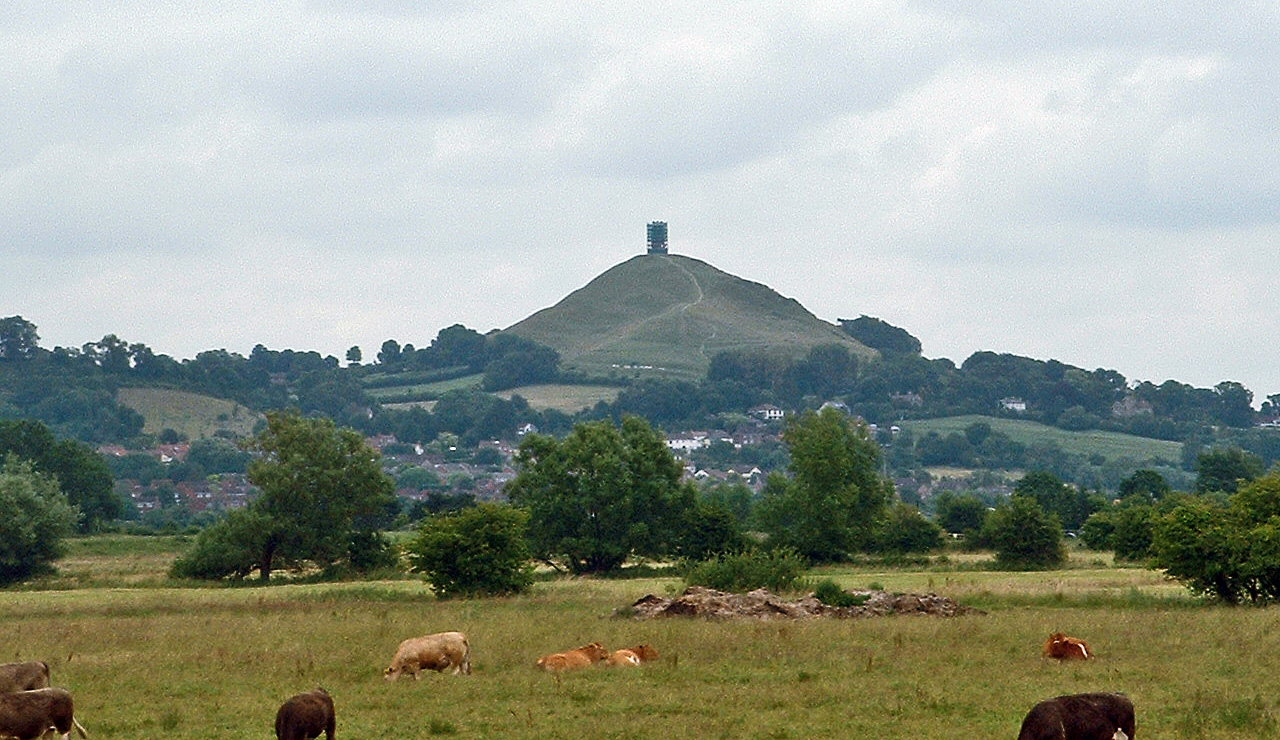
Glastonbury Tor

According to Arthurian legend, Avalon became associated with Glastonbury Tor when monks at Glastonbury Abbey claimed to have discovered the bones of King Arthur and his queen. What is more certain is that Glastonbury was an important religious centre by 700. It claims to be "the oldest above-ground Christian church in the World" by dating the founding of the community of monks to AD 63, the year of the legendary visit of Joseph of Arimathea, who was supposed to have brought the Holy Grail to England.

During the Middle Ages there were also important religious sites at Woodspring Priory and Muchelney Abbey. The present Diocese of Bath and Wells covers Somerset and a small area of Dorset. The Episcopal seat of the Bishop of Bath and Wells is now located in the Cathedral Church of Saint Andrew in the city of Wells, having been previously based at Bath Abbey. Before the English Reformation, it was a Roman Catholic diocese. There is also a Benedictine monastery, Saint Gregory's Abbey (commonly known as Downside Abbey), at Stratton-on-the-Fosse, and a Cistercian Cleeve Abbey near the village of Washford. Culbone Church is the smallest English parish church still holding services.

Many legends exist about Somerset. The Stanton Drew stone circles are said to have been formed when a wedding party continued to dance on the Lord's day. Likewise the Witch of Wookey Hole is said to have been turned to stone by a priest.

The Norton Fitzwarren Dragon is just one of many stories about dragons in Somerset. After a battle a dragon was formed from the pile of corpses and it began terrorising the area by devouring children and destroying crops. A young man took on the beast and after a long and bloody struggle, he pierced the dragons heart and cut off its head. In All Saints Church, a sixteenth-century rood screen depicts the story.

== Museums and art galleries ==
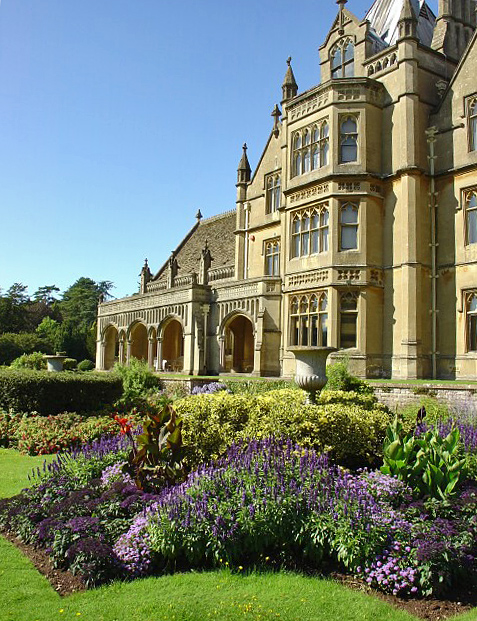
Tyntesfield.

There are a number of museums and art galleries in the county, several of which are in Bath. These include: the American Museum in Britain, the Building of Bath Collection, the Herschel Museum of Astronomy, the Jane Austen Centre, and the Roman Baths. Fine art collections can be found at the Victoria Art Gallery, Holburne Museum of Art and the Museum of East Asian Art.

The main Museum of Somerset along with the Somerset Military Museum are in Taunton Castle, while museums such as the Blake Museum, Weston Museum, the Somerset Rural Life Museum in Glastonbury and the Peat Moors Centre, explore the counties rural history and crafts.

Other visitor attractions reflect the cultural, historical and industrial heritage of the county: Claverton Pumping Station, Dunster Working Watermill, Nunney Castle, King John's Hunting Lodge in Axbridge, Radstock Museum and Westonzoyland Pumping Station Museum.

More recent technology is exhibited at the Fleet Air Arm Museum at Yeovilton, The Helicopter Museum in Weston-super-Mare and Haynes International Motor Museum in Sparkford.

== Historic buildings ==
Somerset has 11,500 listed buildings; 523 scheduled monuments; 192 conservation areas; 41 parks and gardens including those at Barrington Court, Holnicote Estate, Prior Park Landscape Garden and Tintinhull Garden; 36 English Heritage sites; and 19 National Trust sites including Clevedon Court, Fyne Court, Montacute House and Tyntesfield; as well as Stembridge Tower Mill, the last remaining thatched windmill in England. Other historic houses in the county which have remained in private ownership or used for other purposes include Halswell House and Marston Bigot. Among the county's most distinctive architectural assets are the Somerset Towers—more than 90 late medieval square-topped church towers, some intricately adorned with delicate tracery window openings, pinnacles, golden hamstone arches, gargoyles, and merlons.

== Sport ==
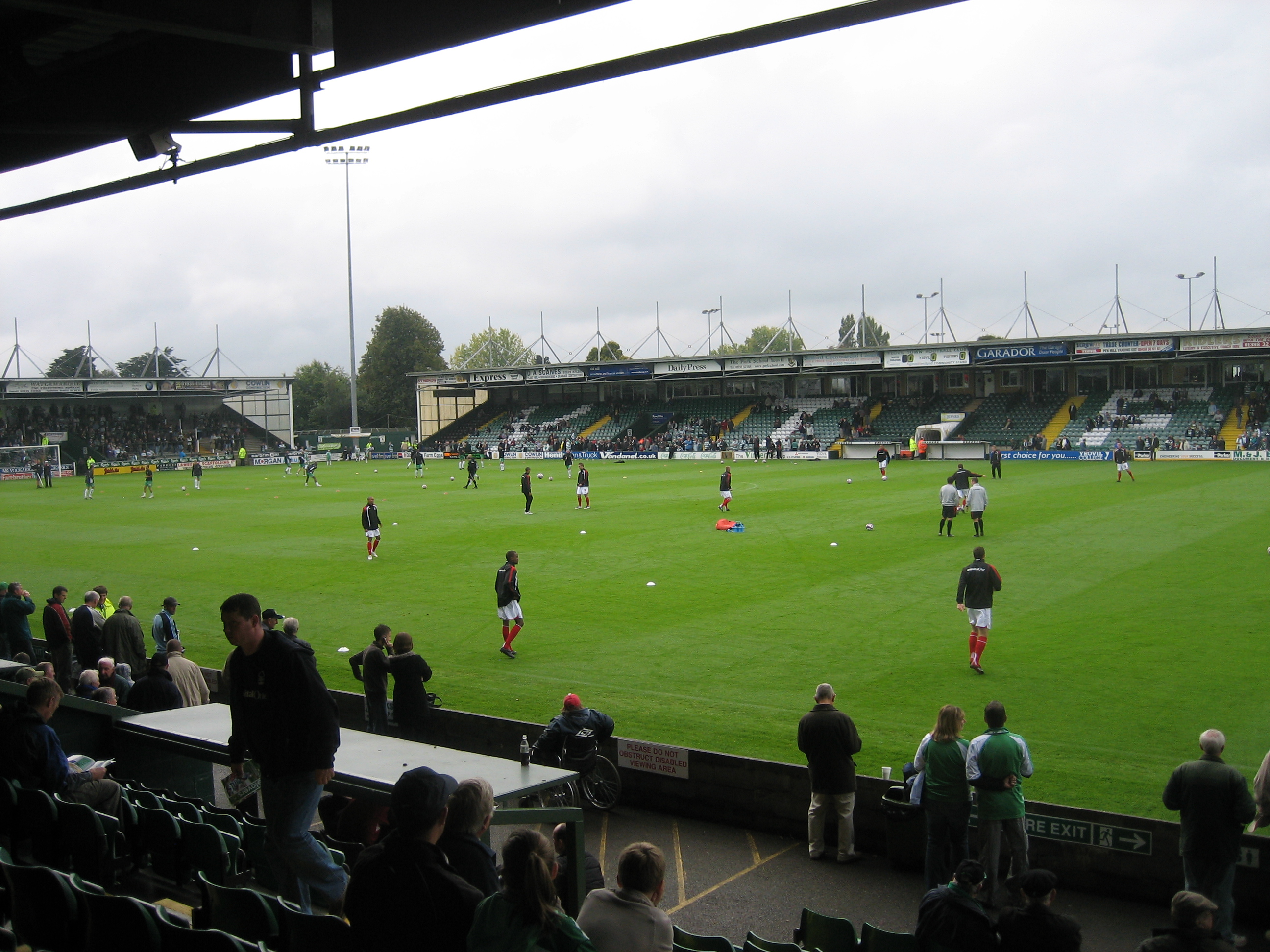
The Huish Park ground of Yeovil Town F.C.

Bath Rugby is an English professional rugby union club that are based in the city of Bath. They play in the Guinness Premiership league. The club has experienced major success, having in the past won England's domestic competition, the Anglo-Welsh Cup (as the John Player and Pilkington Cup), as well as the Heineken Cup. Founded in 1865, Bath Football Club is one of the oldest and most successful clubs in existence. They play at the Recreation Ground, also known as the Rec. Somerset Vikings are a rugby league team who play at Hyde Park, Taunton in the South West Division of the Rugby League Conference.

The Somerset County Cricket Club is one of the 18 major county clubs which make up the English domestic cricket structure, representing the historic county of Somerset. Its limited overs team is called the Somerset Sabres. The club has its headquarters at the County Ground, Taunton. First-class games are also played at Bath. Former grounds include Weston-super-Mare, Frome, Glastonbury, Wells and the Imperial Tobacco ground in south Bristol. Amateur cricket is also played by teams in the North Somerset Cricket League and West of England Premier League.

Yeovil Town F.C. is an English football team based in Yeovil, Somerset. The club play the National League, the fifth tier of the English football league system. They won promotion to the Football League as Conference champions in 2003, and had long been established as the most successful non-league team in the FA Cup - having defeated major Football League teams, most famously Sunderland in the 4th Round in 1949, going on to play in front of more than 81,000 against Manchester United at Maine Road. They play their home games at Huish Park. The Somerset FA is the governing body of football in the county of Somerset. The association was formed in 1885. There are several minor football leagues in the county, including the Weston super Mare and District League, the Somerset County Football League and the Perry Street and District League.

Yeovil Olympiads Athletics Club in Yeovil was founded in 1969 and has produced many international athletes since its creation. The first was Eric Berry who came 6th in the 1973 European Juniors in the hammer event. Olympians who started with the club include Max Robertson and Gary Jennings, both 400 metres hurdlers.

The Somerset Rebels are a speedway team from Highbridge, Somerset. Founded in 2000, the club competes in the Premier League. Their home track is located at the Oak Tree Arena. Mendips Raceway is another motorsport venue in the Mendip Hills. It is located on the rim of Batts Combe quarry between Shipham and Charterhouse. The oval shaped circuit is used for racing hot rods, stock cars, Hotstox, bangers and demolition events. The circuit, which was opened in 1969, features an oval and a figure of eight layout. On 14 September 2008, the circuit hosted the BriSCA F2 World Championship Final.

Horse racing courses are at Taunton and Wincanton.

There are several golf courses including Enmore Park Golf Club.

== Media ==
In addition to the English national newspapers the county is served by the regional Western Daily Press and local newspapers including; the Bath Chronicle, Chew Valley Gazette, Clevedon Mercury, Mendip Times and the Somerset County Gazette. Television and radio are provided by BBC Somerset, Heart West, The Breeze (Yeovil & South Somerset) and ITV Wales & West (previously known as HTV).

== See also ==
- Music of Somerset
