= Sand festival =

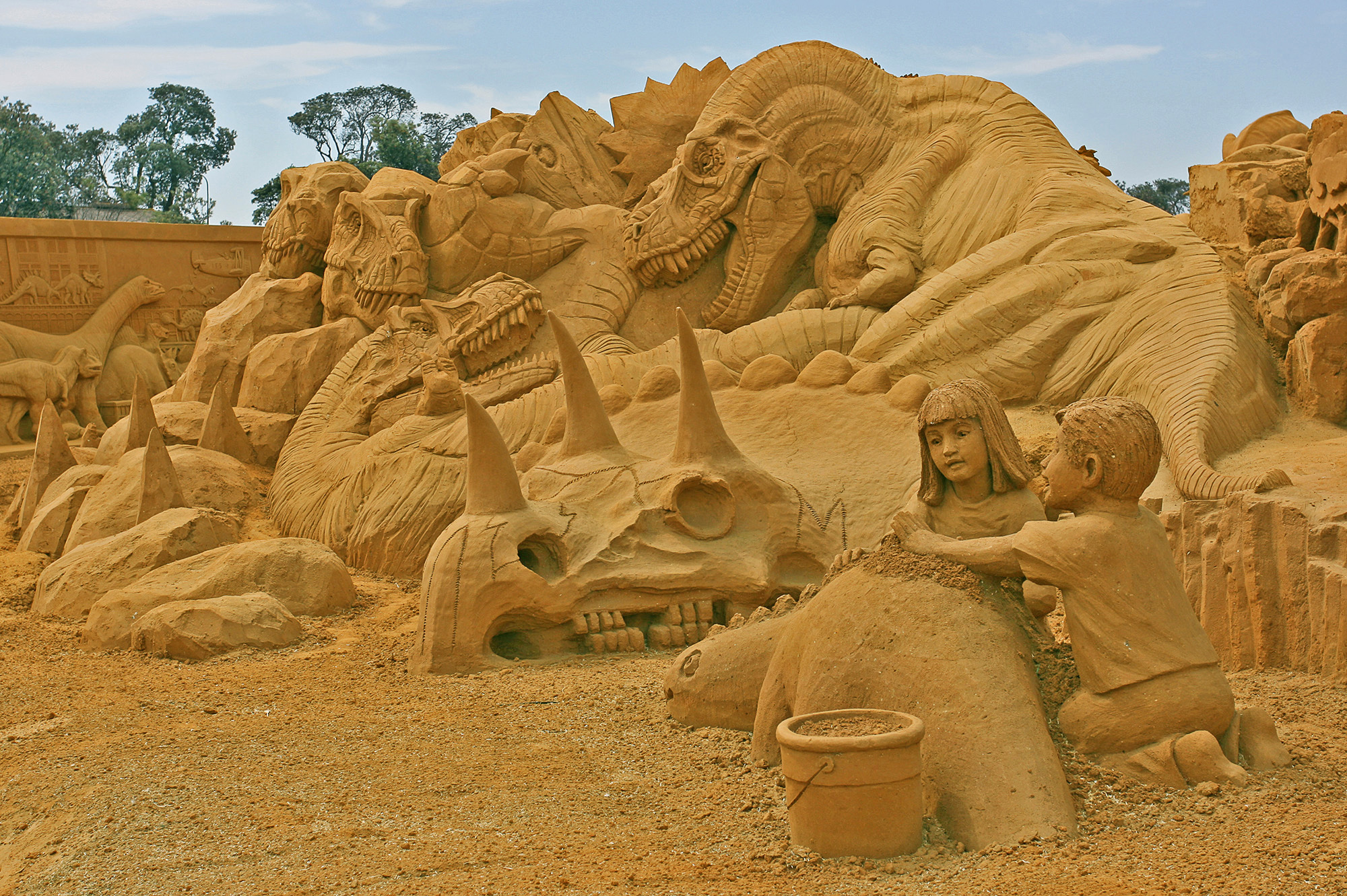
An elaborate sandsculpting display at the Sand Sculpting Australia "Dinostory" festival

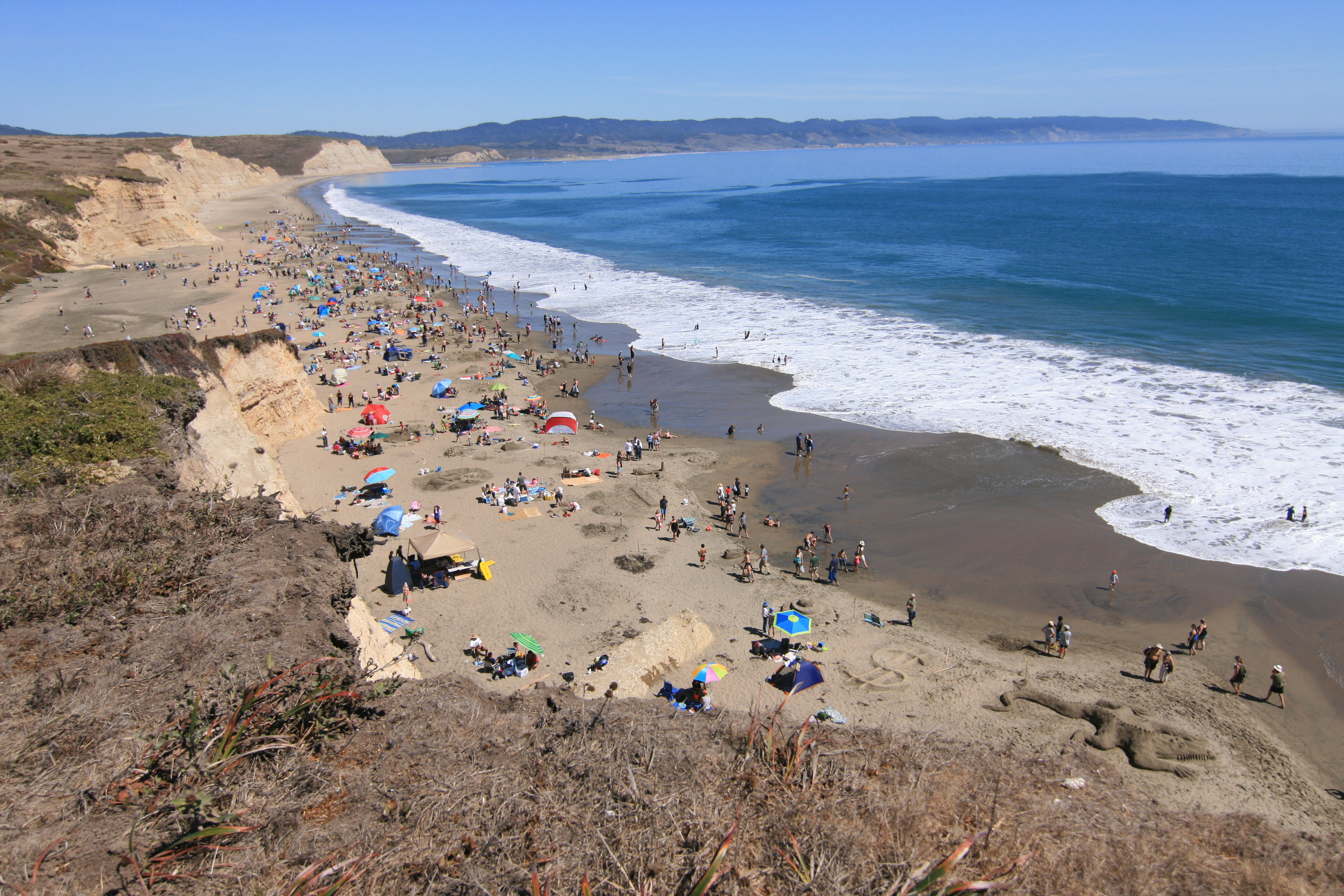
Drakes Beach during a 2015 sand sculpture contest

Sand festivals or festivals of sand sculpture are exhibitions of sculptures made of sand carried out in various places around the world. These events usually include a competition.

Traditional sand sculptures are sandcastles. However, at sand festivals one may see virtually any kinds of sculptures you would expect to see in stone, bronze or wood.

== Australia ==
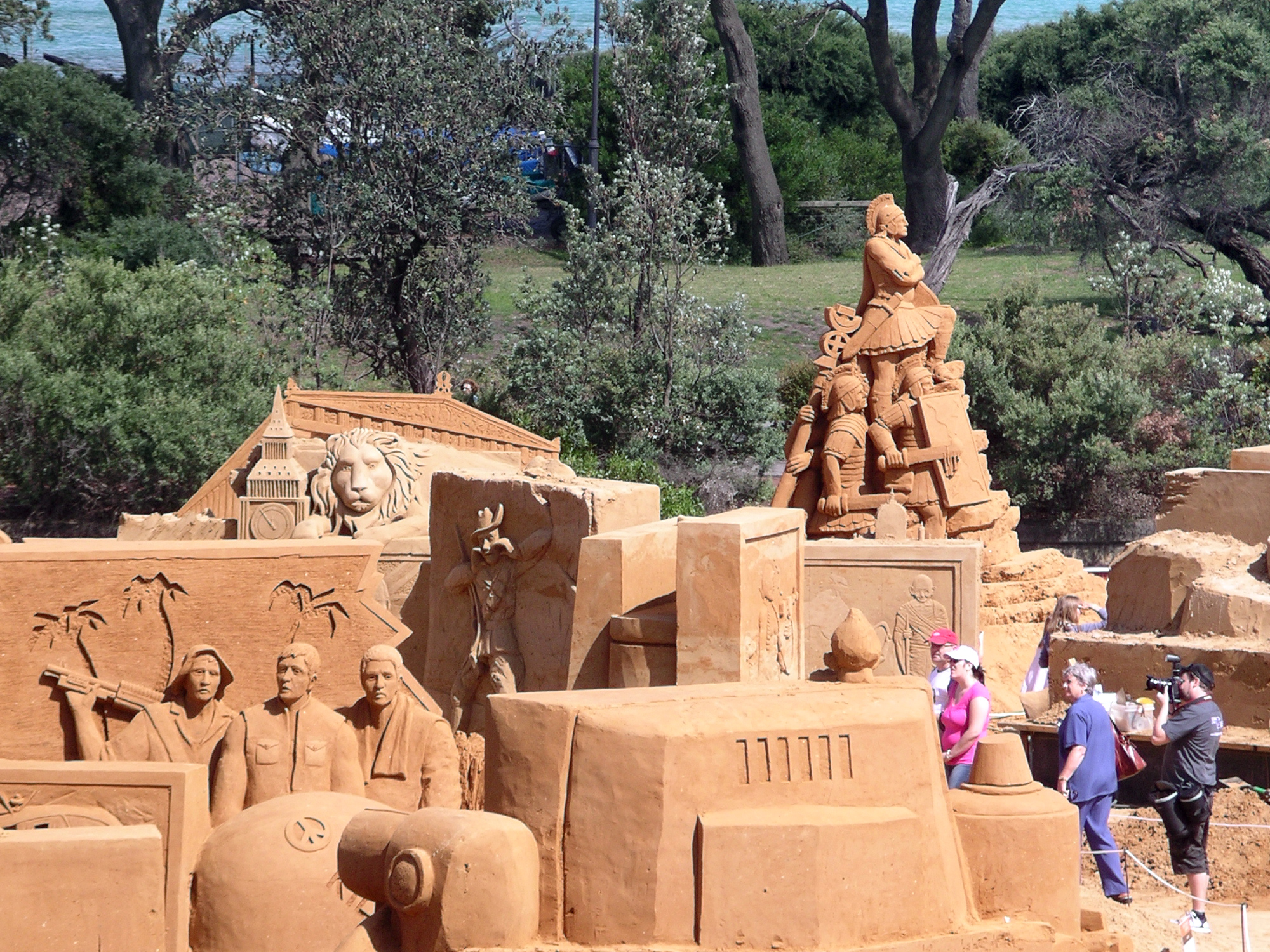
Sand Sculpting Australia, 2009

The Sand Sculpting Australia festival has been held annually in Frankston, Victoria since 2008, and was held for seven years prior to this on the foreshore at Rye, Victoria. This event features a different theme each year, with the 2008–2009 theme being dinosaurs in an exhibit called "Dinostory".

== Canada ==
- Clam Harbour, Nova Scotia
- Lac Beauchamp Park
- Harrison Hot Springs, British Columbia Former Host of the World Championships of sand sculpture. Fort Myers Beach Florida, is the host of the Solo Division in 2011. Siesta key, Florida will host the Doubles Division.

== Germany ==
Germany conducts regular sand festivals in:

- Berlin (Sandsation). The one in July 2005 was called Sandsation 2005.

2010 : 6.June – 28. August near O2-world

- Travemünde (Sand World)

== India ==
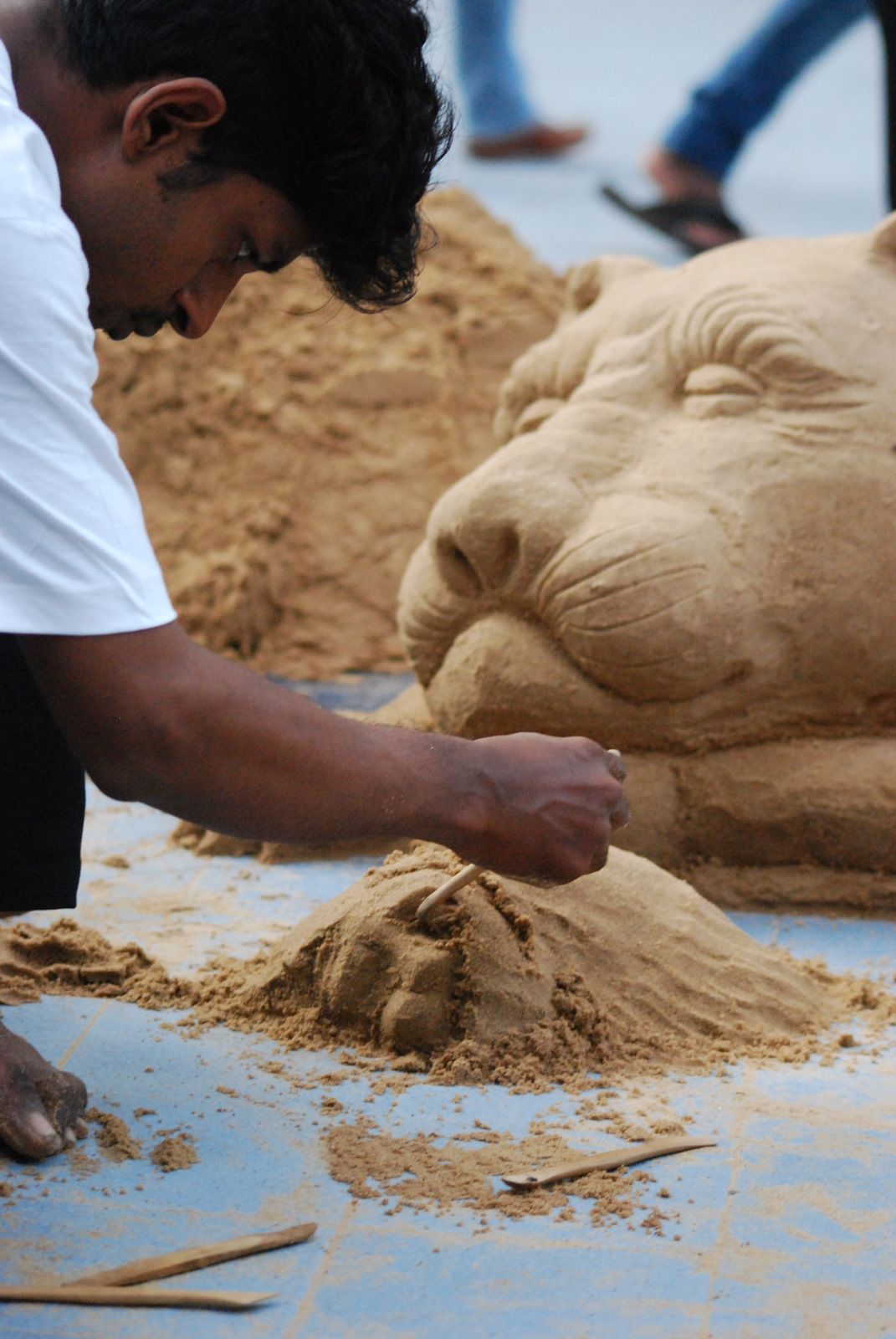
Sand sculptor at work at the Goa Sand Art Festival

Indian sand artist Sudarshan Patnaik created a sculpture in memory of the victims of the tsunami disaster in Puri, south of the capital of the Indian state of Odisha, Bhubaneshwar. The determination of this man, support, and a consorted effort from his friends in Puri, culminated in the formation of the Golden Sand Art Institute 1995. The institute is an open-air institute with no boundaries and limitations. It is located on the seashore that spans between Hotel May Fair Beach Resort and the Panthanivas in Puri.

Goa Sand Art Festival is an annual event hosted in Goa, in association with Goa Tourism. The ‘Goa Sand Art Festival’ is a three-day festival held at Candolim beach, which is one of the pristine beaches in Goa. It is a three-day art festival held in December on the weekend before Christmas with different themes to highlight a particular issue. The Goa Sand Art Festival conceptualized and organized by Jerry Jose is one of its kind art festivals involving the students and upcoming artists.

== Indonesia ==
The Indonesia Sand Sculpture Festival, described as the largest sand sculpture event in Southeast Asia, held in Sentul - Bogor, West Java, Indonesia on December 18, 2011 – January 28, 2012.

== Japan ==
- Fukiage beach sand sculpture and exhibition event in Minamisatsuma, Kyushu Island. This event first held on 1987, originally schedule on August until 2001, a year gap, schedule change to May since 2003.

== Netherlands ==
- Scheveningen

== Pakistan ==
Since 2011, Sand Castle Contest has been an annual event in Karachi at Seaview Beach by Lets Build On (LBoN) under the theme of "Clean Beach; Clean Karachi" which has 10 events annually around the beach in its loop & all are led by Dr Zsuzsanna Fajcsak.

In 2012 on 9 September, the 2nd Sand Castle Building Contest was held where around 250-300 participants including families, kids, students & foreigners joined it.

== Portugal ==
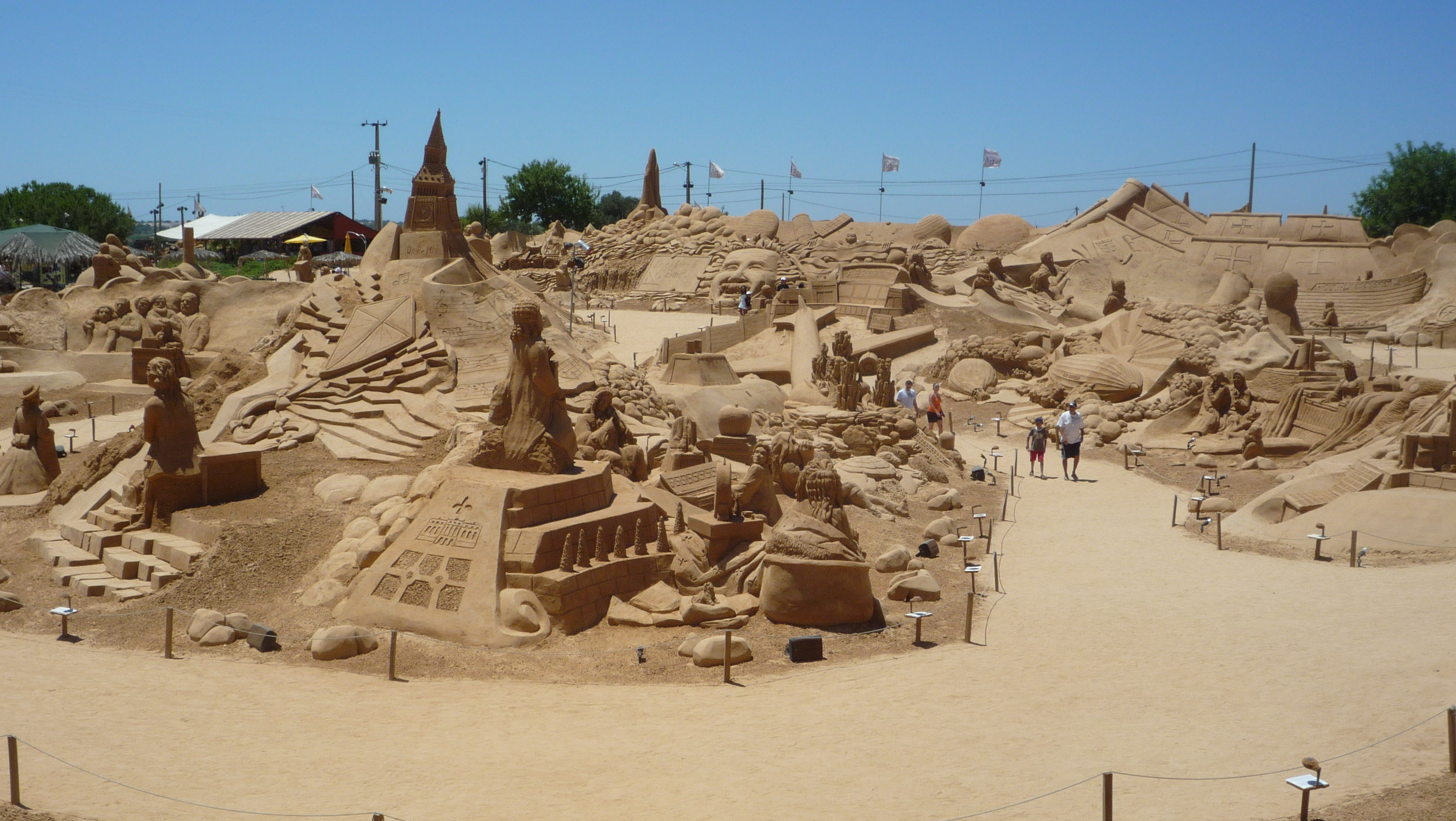
FIESA

The International Sand Sculpture Festival (FIESA), described as the largest sand sculpture event in the world, has been held in Pêra, Algarve annually since 2003. Recently relocated to Lagoa, in a permanent park called SandCity.

== Russia ==
International festivals of sand sculptures (фестиваль песчаной скульптуры) are organized in Russia.

Since 2001 an event has been held in St. Petersburg in the Peter and Paul Fortress. Fourteen teams from ten countries participated at the first one.

In 2002 an international festival was held in Anapa.

On September 1, 2005 the event was held in the Moscow Zoo with the participation of artists from Russia, Sweden, Latvia, Finland and Ukraine. The motto was "Animal World".

== Switzerland ==
The yearly Sandskulpturen takes place in Rorschach, on the coast of the Bodensee (a.k.a. Lake Constance).

== Turkey ==
- Antalya International Antalya Sand Sculpture Festival

== United Kingdom ==
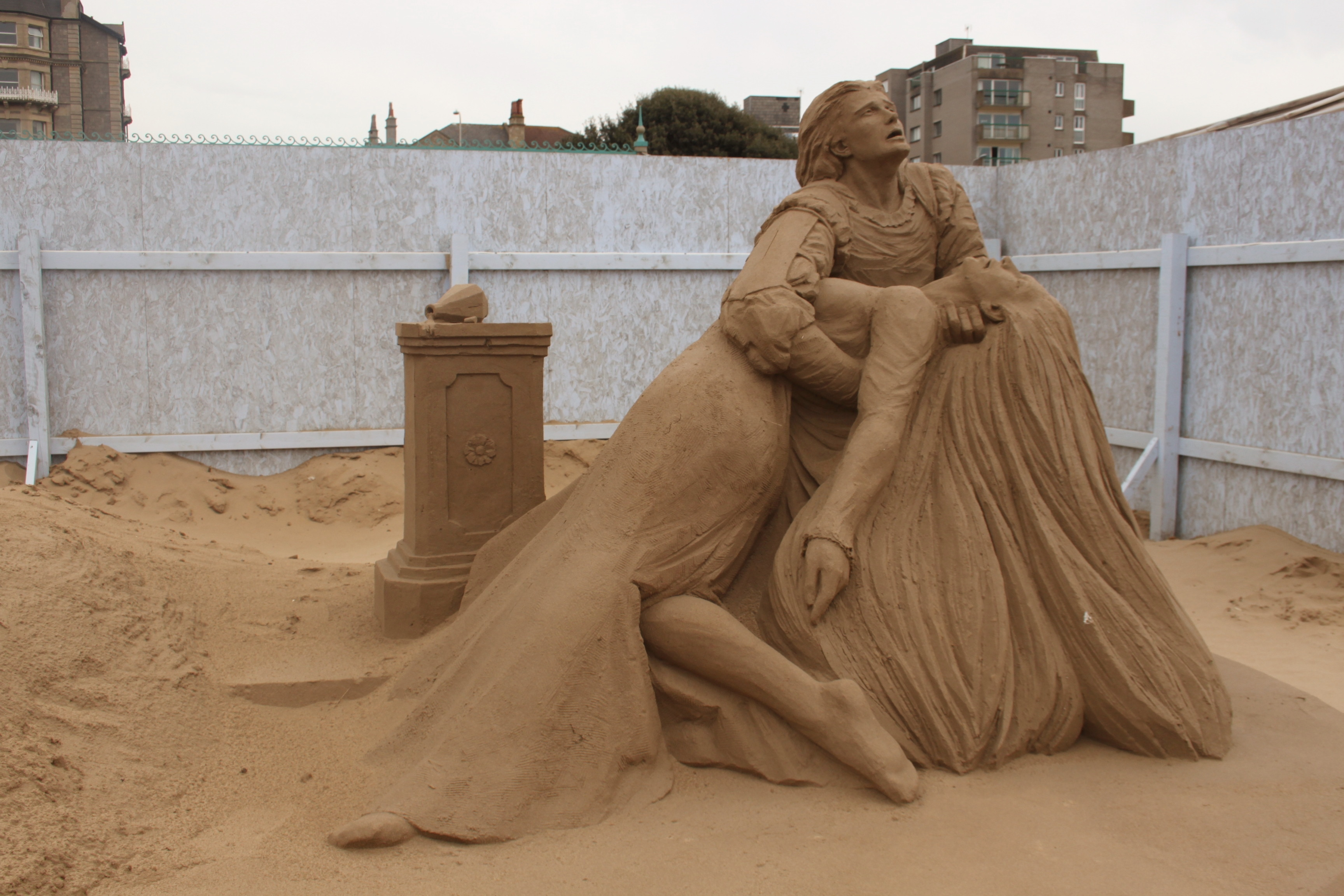
Sand Sculpture at the Weston-super-Mare Sand Sculpture Festival of Romeo and Juliet by Marielle Heessels

Weston-super-Mare has held the annual Weston-super-Mare Sand Sculpture Festival since 2005.

== United States ==
There are several master level sand sculpting competitions in the U.S. Many of them like Sand Castle Days on South Padre Island, Texas or The American Championships on Fort Myers Beach, Florida have been around since the late 1980s. These events bring in sand sculptors from around the world, hosting between 10 and 30 sculptors. The US also hosts many amateur level competitions on beaches around the country.

- Savannah College of Art and Design hosts a Sand Arts Festival every April.
- Hampton Beach, New Hampshire hosts the Master Sand Sculpting Classic every June since 2001.

== See also ==
- Sand art and play
- Ice sculpture
- Snow sculpture
