= Espiche River =

River of the Algarve, Portugal

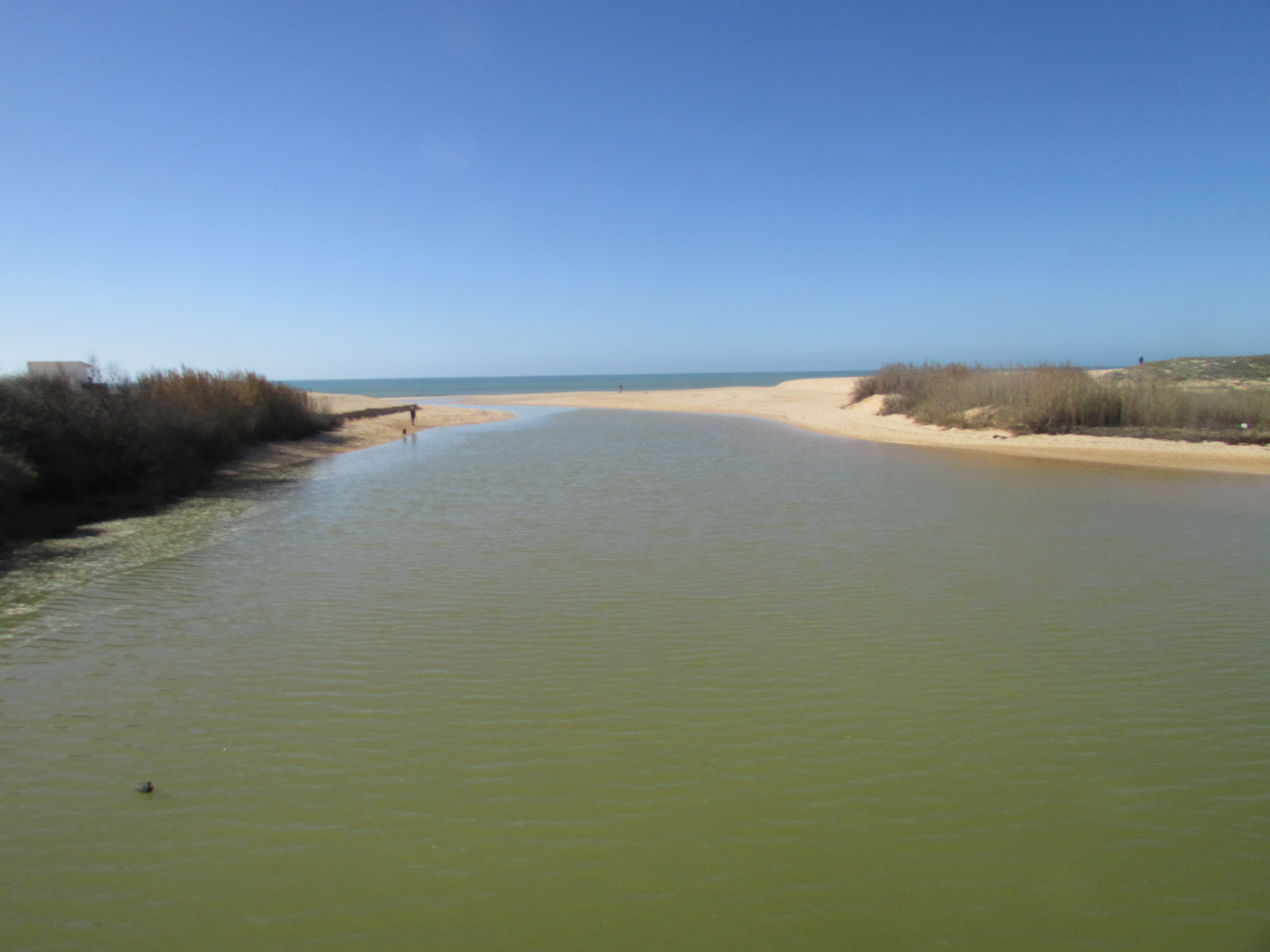

- Location of the mouth of the Espiche River in Portugal
- Native name: Ribeiro de Espiche (Portuguese)

Location
- Country: Portugal
- Region: Algarve
- District: Faro
- Municipality: Albufeira

Physical characteristics
- Source
  - location: Algoz, Algarve
  - coordinates: 37°08′57.3″N 8°17′42.6″W
- Mouth: The south central coast of the Algarve into the Atlantic at Praia dos Salgados
  - coordinates: 37°05′22″N 8°19′46″W
- Length: 5.4 km (3.4 mi), north to south

The Espiche River (Portuguese pronunciation: [ɨʃˈpiʃɨ]) is a small river in the south central region of the Algarve, Portugal which rises a little south-east of the village of Algoz. It runs south towards the south coast, and its mouth is at the Praia dos Salgados between Armação de Pêra and Albufeira.

== Description ==
The river runs for a length of 8.7 kilometres (5.4 mi) from its spring to the mouth at Salgados.

=== Salgados Lagoon ===
Behind the beach is an area of wetland called the Salgados Lagoon which is fed by the waters of the river. It is a shallow salt marsh which was restored and is now an important wildlife habitat for the area. The east banks of the lagoon have been transformed into a golf course. Whilst the west bank behind the sandbar has been conserved as a large wetland which has become an excellent habitat for a large variety of water fowl and has become an important stopping point for thousands of migrating birds. The lagoon has been classified as an IBA (Important Bird Area). It has been estimated that Salgados has upwards of 5,000 water fowl of 60 different species. These species include Purple gallinule, Purple heron and is a nesting site for the Ferruginous duck.

=== Zoomarine ===
Further up stream from the coast, the river passes around the western perimeter of the visitor attraction called the Zoomarine theme park and crosses under the N125 principal east to west coast road.
