= Pêra (Silves) =

- Civil parish
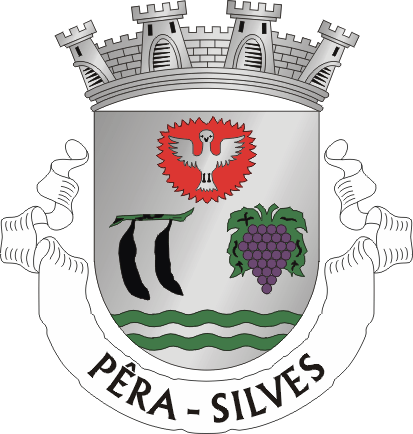
- Coat of arms

- Location in Portugal
- Coordinates: 37°7′22.8″N 8°20′20.4″W
- Country: Portugal
- Region: Algarve
- Intermunic. comm.: Algarve
- District: Faro
- Municipality: Silves
- Disbanded: 2013

Area
  - Total: 20.6 km^{2} (8.0 sq mi)

Population (2001)
  - Total: 1,951
  - Density: 94.7/km^{2} (245/sq mi)
- Time zone: UTC+00:00 (WET)
  - Summer (DST): UTC+01:00 (WEST)
- Postal code: 8365

Pêra (Portuguese pronunciation: [ˈpeɾɐ]) is a former civil parish in the municipality of Silves, Portugal. In 2013, the parish merged into the new parish Alcantarilha e Pêra. The village is 12.5 kilometres (7.8 mi) south east of Silves and is 261 kilometres (162 mi) south south east of Lisbon. The village used to be called Pêra de Cima or Upper Pêra to distinguish it from the present Armação de Pêra, which was then named Pêra de Baixo (Lower Pêra).

== Description ==
Pêra is located a little south of the N125 coast road and is linked to Albufeira by the old municipal road Estr EN526. Pêra has benefited from the road by-pass built several years back which diverted most of the traffic away from the village which often brought it to a standstill. The narrow streets of the village were only ever intended to accommodate pedestrians and horse-drawn vehicles.

The International Sand Sculpture Festival (FIESA) is held annually in the parish.

The parish of Pêra has within its boundaries the villages of

- Arroteies
- Benagaia
- Fonte Negra
- Louriga
- Mesquita
- Monte Raposo
- Relvas
- Rogel
- São Lourenço
- Sentieiras
- Torrinha
- Vale de Margem
- Vales

== Parish Church ==
The patron of the village is the Divine Holy Ghost. Pêra main parish church was built in the 18th century and has a single nave and a simple apse. The highlight of the church is the altarpiece with a pyramid-shaped throne in the Baroque style which is located at the end of the chancel. Also from the Baroque period are the side altarpiece, as well as those in the Chapels of Nossa Senhora do Rosário (Our lady of the Rosary) and Sagrado Coracão de Jesus (Sacred Heart of Jesus). Both these chapels have statues which date from the 18th century. The church also possesses interesting figurative tiles in the chancel which depict the four evangelists, Matthew, Mark, Luke and John.

== Nature Reserve ==
2 kilometres (1.2 mi) from the village to southeast, close to the beach, there are some marshes by the name of the Lagoa dos Salgados. The salt marshes are a refuge for many varieties of waterfowl and has a rich abundance of vegetation.
