= Bridgwater Science Festival =

- Status: Active
- Genre: Science Festival
- Frequency: Annual
- Locations: Bridgwater, Somerset
- Country: England
- Founder: Tom Payne

The Bridgwater Science Festival is a science festival which takes place in Bridgwater, in the English county of Somerset in the May half term holiday, contributing to the public awareness of science for the local population.

== Introduction and History ==
The Bridgwater Science Festival was set up in 2013 with the first Festival taking place in 2014, supported by the Institute of Physics (South West branch) and Futures for Somerset. The festival held its second event in 2015 at Bridgwater Town Hall, supported by Bridgwater Town Council, the University of the West of England and the Institute of Physics.

== Programme ==
The Bridgwater Science Festival aims to attract as wide an audience as possible in entertaining, inspiring and engaging science-based activities. It is a community event with the emphasis on getting children and their families to experience fun, hands-on activities.

== Festival History ==
=== 2015 ===
The main 'Family Fun Day' acted as the opening event in 2015, and moved to the Town Hall. Many more people attended the event than the previous year. Notable participants included:

- University of the West of England Science Communication Unit
- UWE Centre for Transport and Society with information on Bristol's self-driving car project
- Bristol Robotics Laboratory Tangible Networks project
- Reptile handling
- Space Detectives - space themed workshop
- Royal Photographic Society's International Images for Science exhibition
- Astronomy with Wells and Mendip Astronomers

There was also a small series of talks on "Extreme Weather" (Met Office); "Spectroscopy" (part of International Year of Light); and "Somerset's Butterflies".

Following the opening day, during the half term events included:

- Funky Fossils at Somerset Brick and Tile Museum
- Information and hands-on fun with Avalon Marshes Learning Partnership

The total attendance was over 1000 people.

=== 2014 ===
The main 'Family Fun Day' took place at Robert Blake Science College on the last day of the festival. Notable participants included:

- University of Bristol School of Medical Sciences
- University of Bristol School of Clinical Sciences
- Several local science-based organisations

Other events during the 2014 Festival included:

- A talk by Simon Singh on The Simpsons and Their Mathematical Secrets, with ticket sales donated to Somerset CF (Flood Relief Fund).
- Science Showoff science-comedy night
