= Lac Beauchamp Park =

Park in Gatineau, Quebec

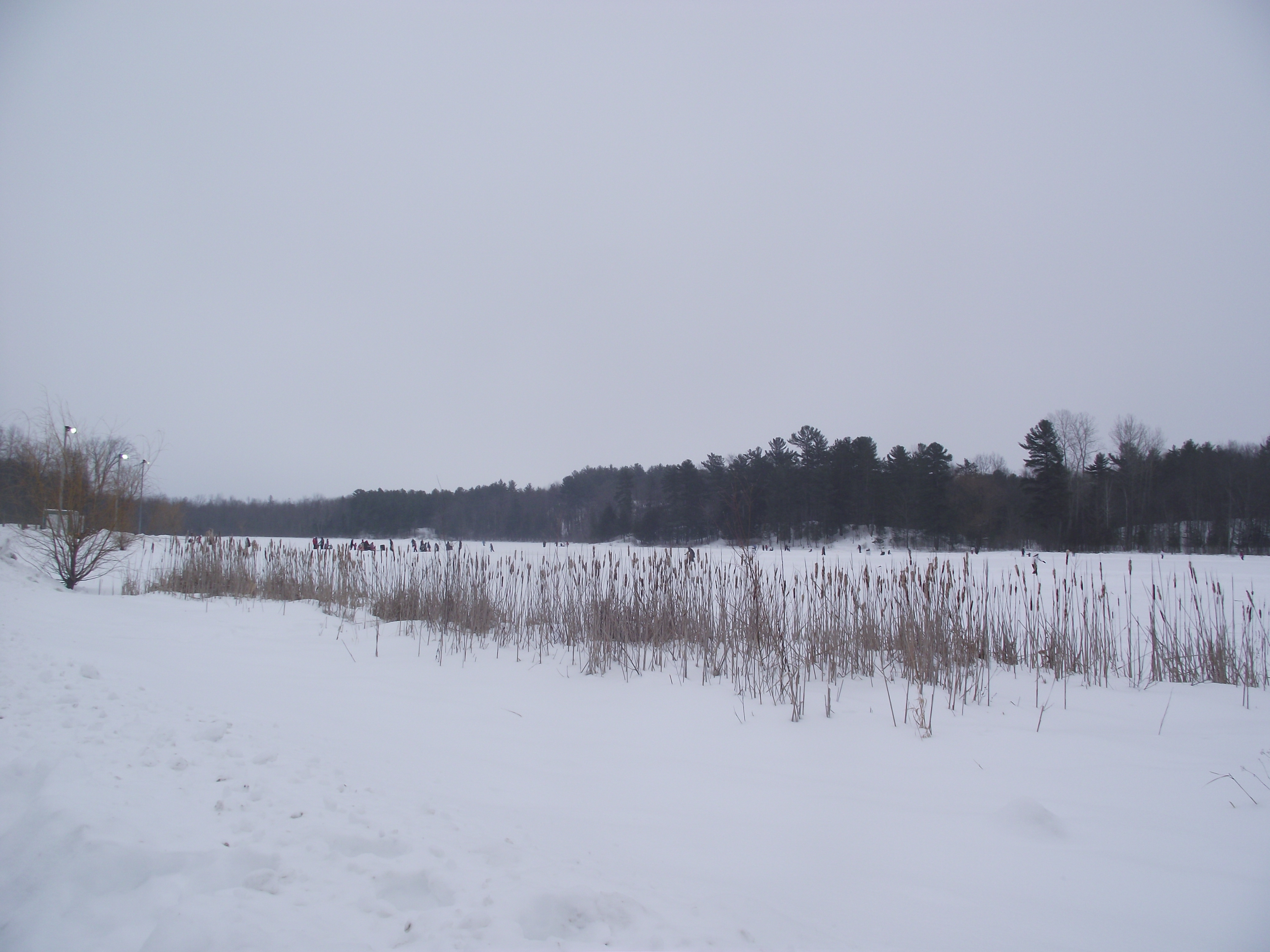
- Lake Beauchamp in the winter
- Interactive map of Lac Beauchamp Park
- Type: Wooded park
- Location: Quebec
- Nearest city: Gatineau
- Coordinates: 45°29′22″N 75°37′21″W
- Area: 172 hectares (430 acres)

Lac Beauchamp Park in Gatineau, Quebec, Canada is a large wooded park of 172 hectares built around a small lake in the middle of the suburban sprawl of the eastern part of the city. In the winter it has 15 km of ski and snowshoe trails. The lake also has a skating area. In the summer, the lake has a supervised swimming beach and canoe rentals. The ski trails are then used by amateur naturalists, hikers and bikers.

The park is located about 10 km East of the downtown core of Gatineau and is thus easy to reach from Ottawa by any of the main bridges.

The city offers several recreational activities in and around the park chalet. Several groups, such as ornithologists, entomologists, and garden lovers use the building and the nature preserve around it for their activities.

There is an annual sand sculpture competition on the beach.
