= International Sand Sculpture Festival =

Coordinates: 37.1289°N 8.3310°W

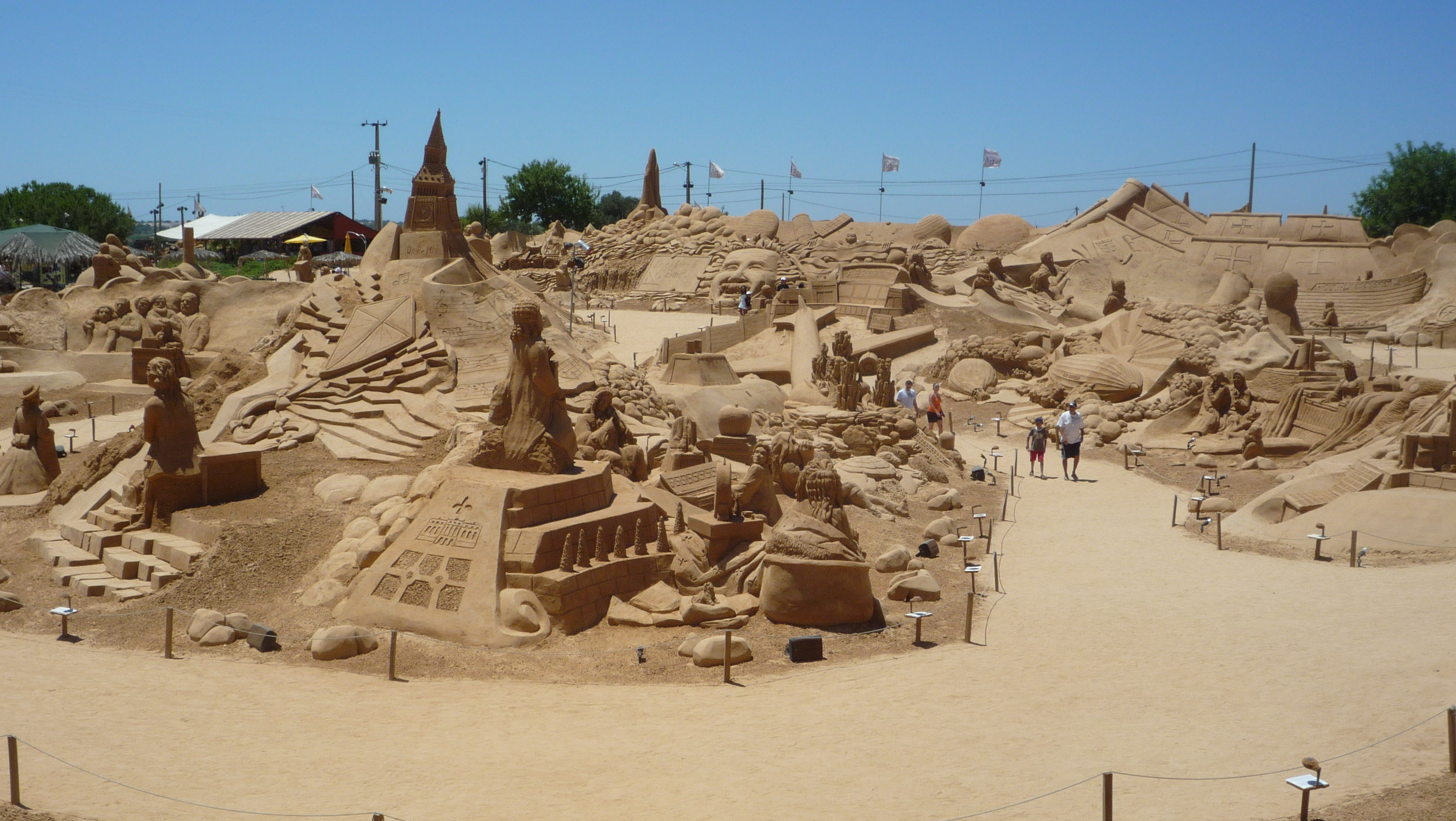
FIESA 2009: Discoveries

Described as the largest sand sculpture event in the world, the International Sand Sculpture Festival or Festival Internacional de Escultura em Areia (FIESA) has been held in Pêra, Algarve, Portugal annually since 2003. The site at occupies 15,000 square metres (3.7 acres). Each year about 60 artists use 35000 tons of sand to create 50 works of art. The exhibition is also open in the evenings with atmospheric lighting.

== Themes ==
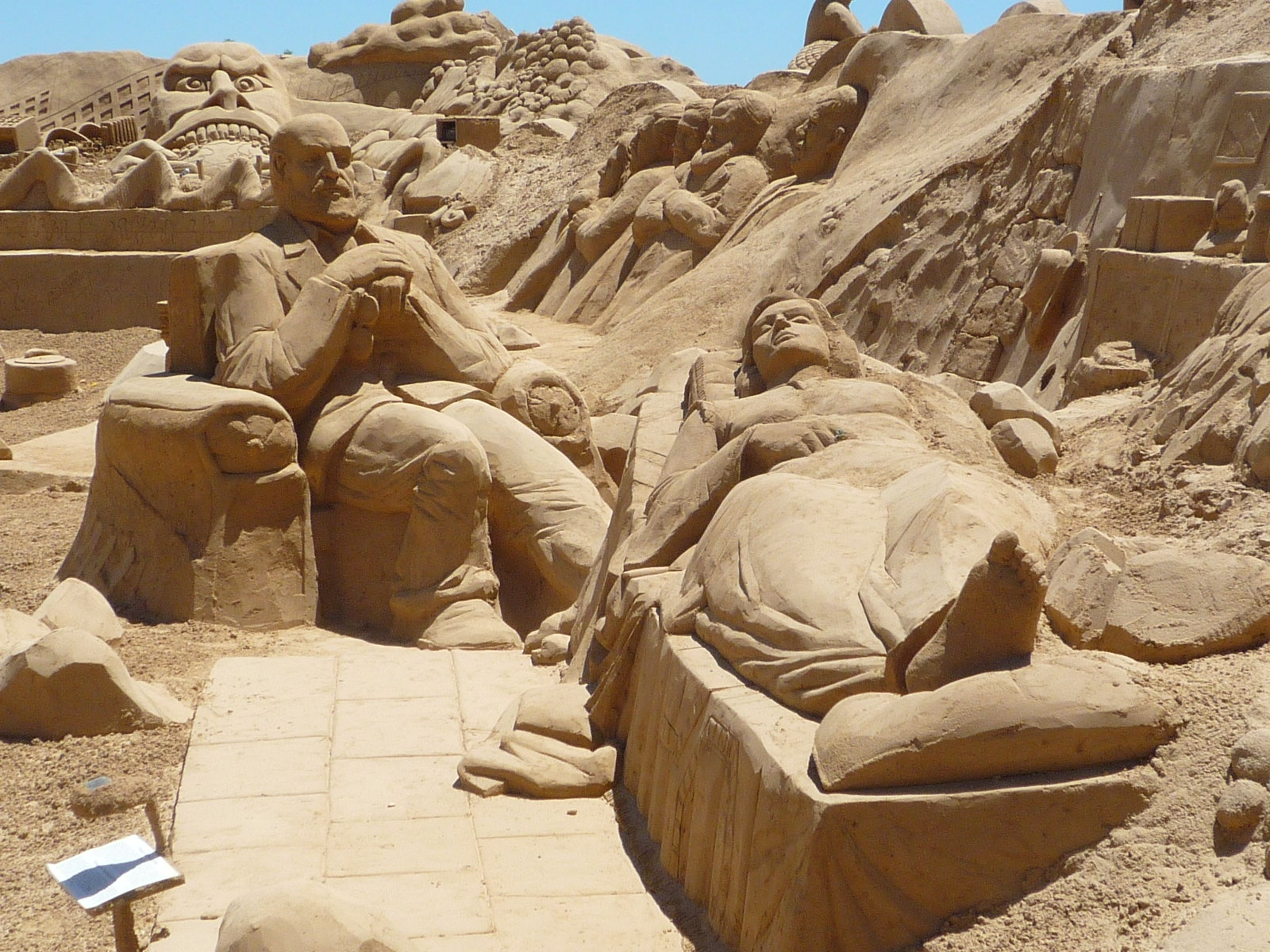
Sigmund Freud with a patient (FIESA 2009)

Each year the exhibition has a different theme:

- 2014: Music II
- 2013: Music
- 2012: Idols
- 2011: Animal Kingdom
- 2010: Living World
- 2009: Discoveries
- 2008: Hollywood Films and Characters
- 2007: Wonders of the World
- 2006: Mythology
- 2005: Lost Worlds
- 2004: Tales of Enchantment

== See also ==
- Sand festival
