= Mendip Times =

Local British Newspaper

- Type: Monthly lifestyle magazine
- Format: Glossy A4 magazine
- Owner: Steve Egginton
- Editor-in-chief: Steve Egginton.
- Associate editor: Mark Adler
- Founded: 2005
- Political alignment: Politically neutral. Mendip Times does not cover politics
- Language: English
- Headquarters: Blagdon
- Circulation: 15,500 copies
- Price: Free
- ISSN: 1475-5874
- Website: https://mendiptimes.co.uk

6....

The Mendip Times is a monthly magazine, distributed free of charge in the Mendip Hills and surrounding areas of Somerset, North Somerset and Bath & North East Somerset, .England.

It was launched in 2005 and has three employees,

The owner, Steve Egginton, is a former chair of the SW branch of the Society of Editors, head of news at HTV, and was formerly producer of BBC Points West and deputy news editor of the Western Daily Press.

Politically, the magazine stays neutral.
