= Armação de Pêra =

- Civil parish
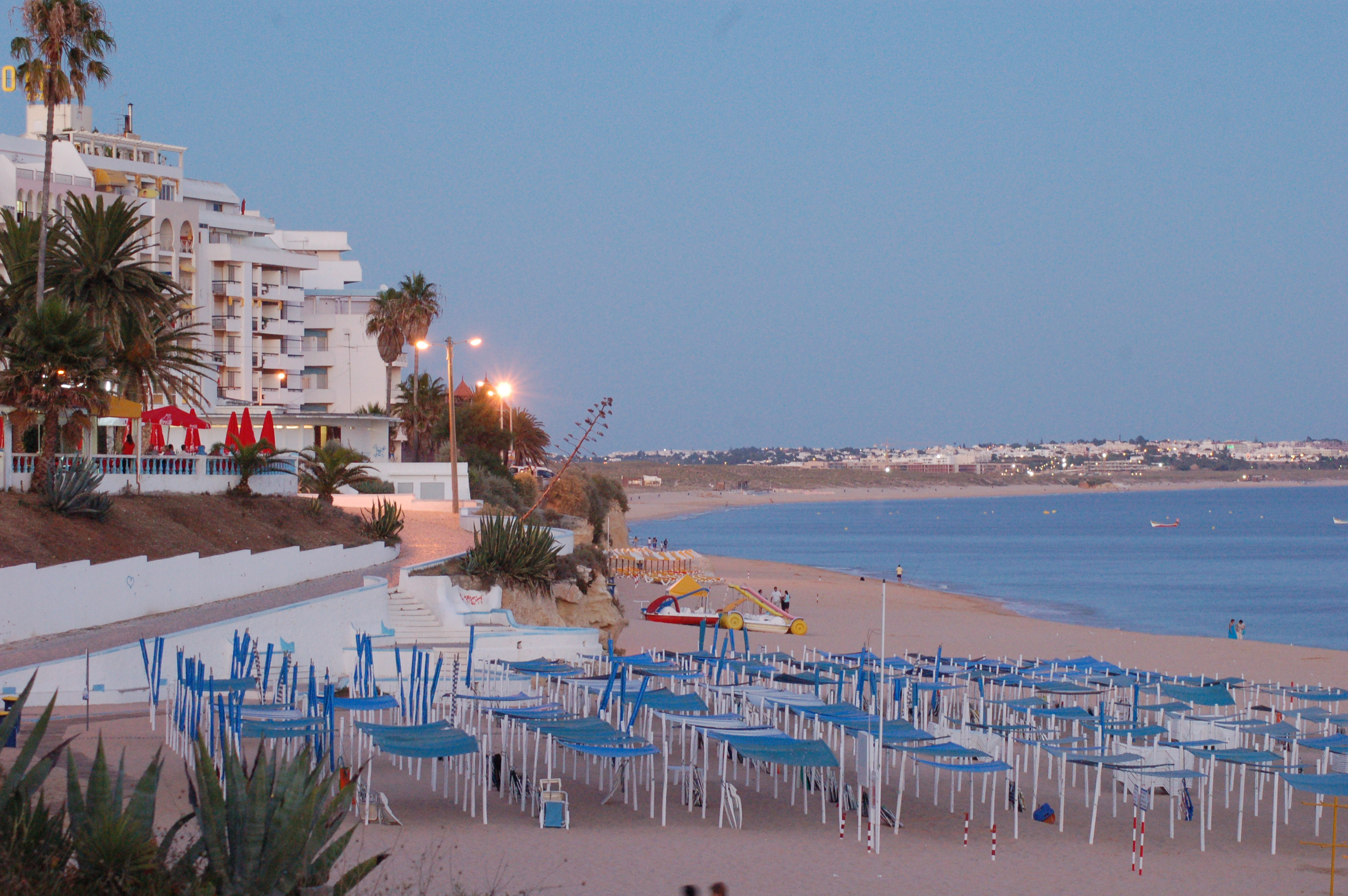
- Beach of Armação de Pêra

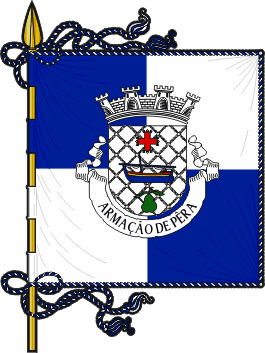
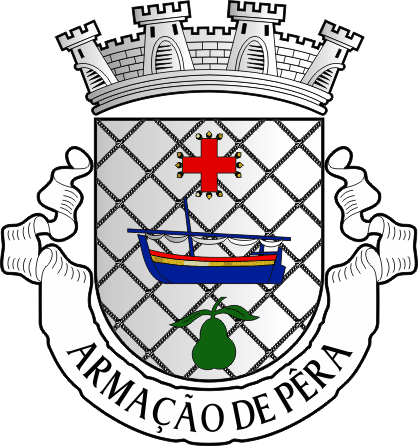
- Flag Coat of arms

- Location in Portugal
- Coordinates: 37.102°N 8.361°W
- Country: Portugal
- Region: Algarve
- Intermunic. comm.: Algarve
- District: Faro
- Municipality: Silves

Area
  - Total: 7.99 km^{2} (3.08 sq mi)

Population (2011)
  - Total: 4,867
  - Density: 609/km^{2} (1,580/sq mi)
- Time zone: UTC+00:00 (WET)
  - Summer (DST): UTC+01:00 (WEST)
- Postal code: 8365

Armação de Pêra is a town (vila) and Portuguese parish (freguesia) in the municipality of Silves. The population in 2011 was 4,867, in an area of 7.99 km^{2}. The village used to be called Pêra de Baixo or Lower Pêra to distinguish it from the present Pêra, which was then named Pêra de Cima or Upper Pêra.

The town (vila in Portuguese) of Armação de Pêra is a popular tourist center with fine beaches, hotels, cafés and restaurants. It is on a broad bay that stretches from Pont da Galé to Senhora da Rocha. Its beaches extend from Praia dos Pescadores or the Fishermen's Beach, to Salomão beach, including those of Maré Grande and Beijinhos.

The town is one of the last places in the region where fishing boats are launched from and recovered to the actual beach. There is no harbour.

== Location ==
The town is 20.9 kilometres (13.0 mi) southeast of Silves, 3 kilometres (1.9 mi) from Alcantarilha, 1.5 kilometres (0.93 mi) from Pêra and 263 kilometres (163 mi) south south east of Lisbon.

== Gallery ==
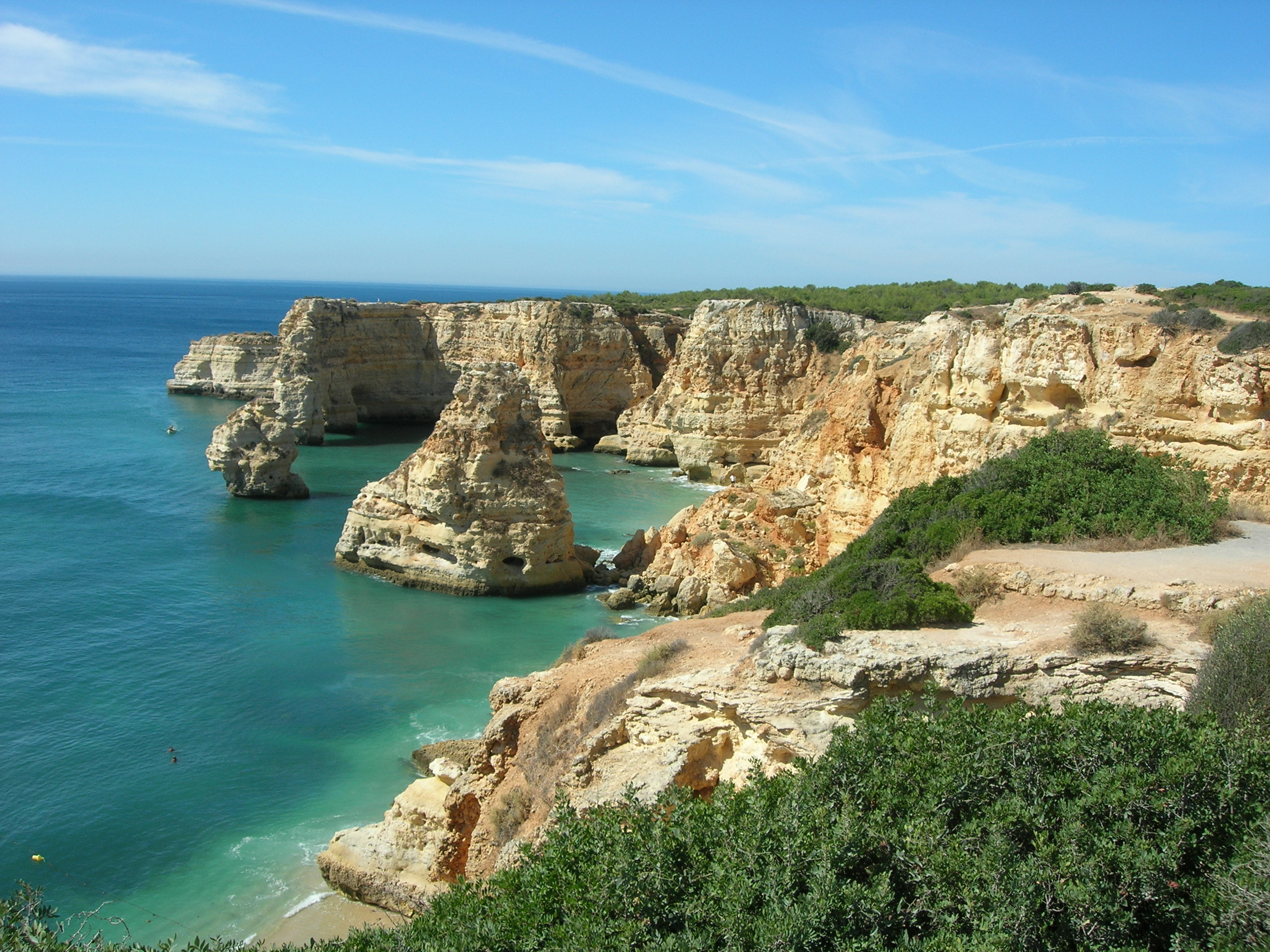

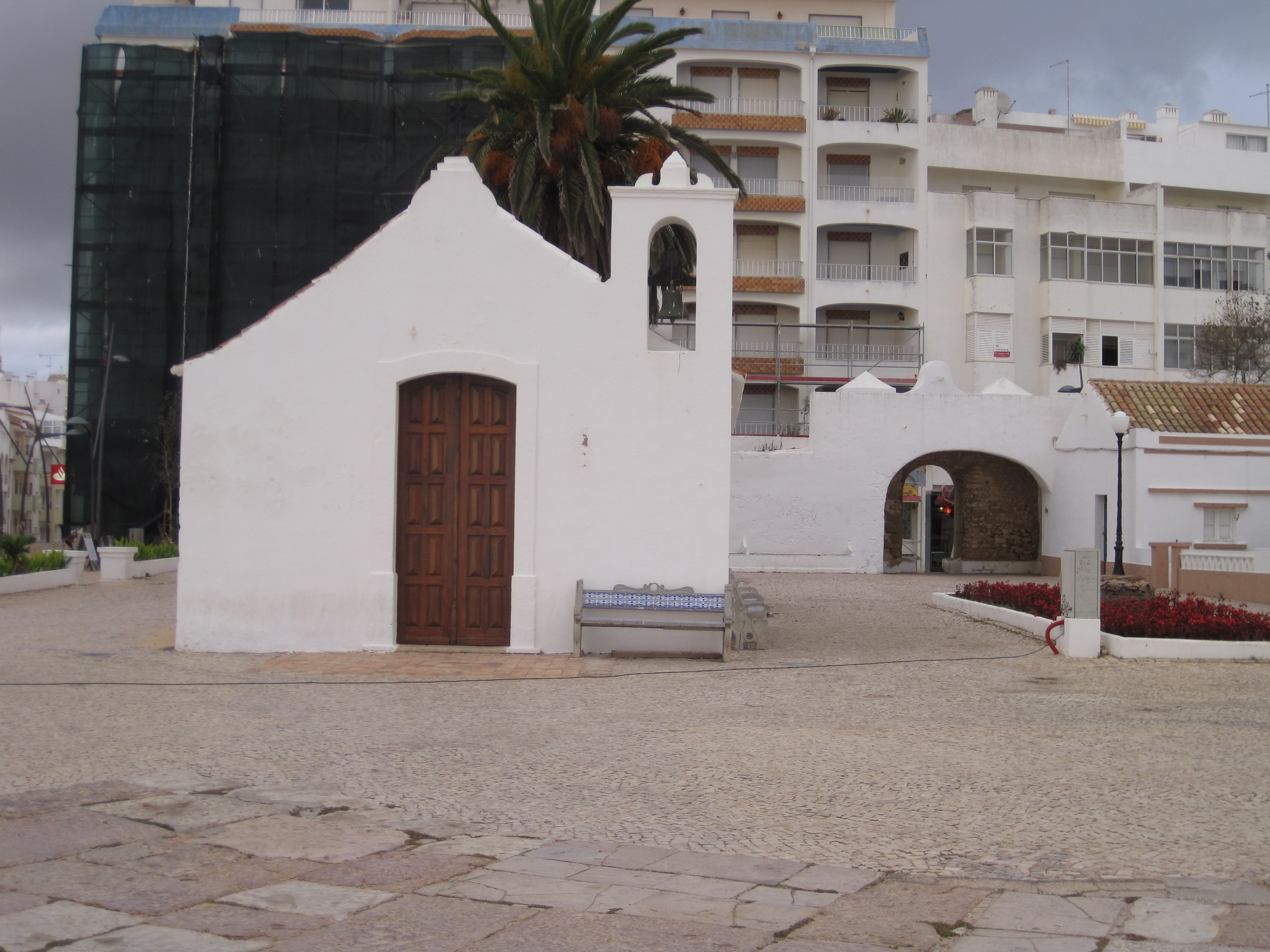
Chapel of Santo António de Armação de Pêra
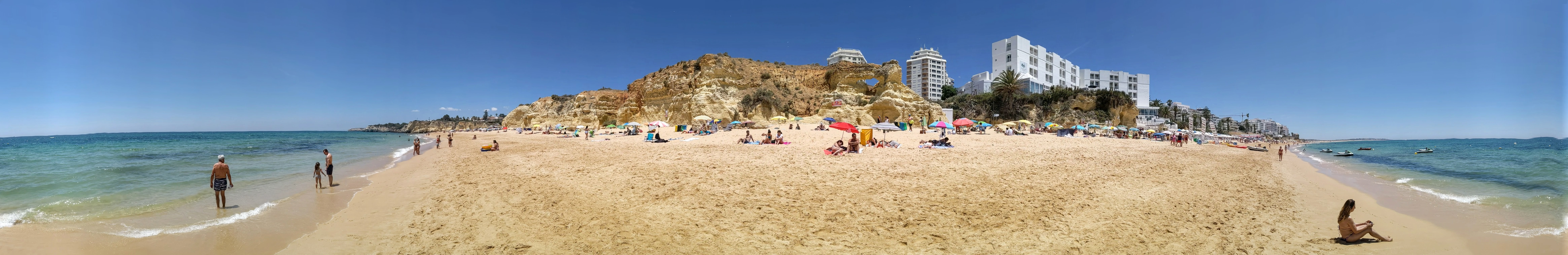
Panoramic view of Praia de Armação de Pêra, with the Holiday Inn, cliffs, and more
