= Weston-super-Mare Sand Sculpture Festival =

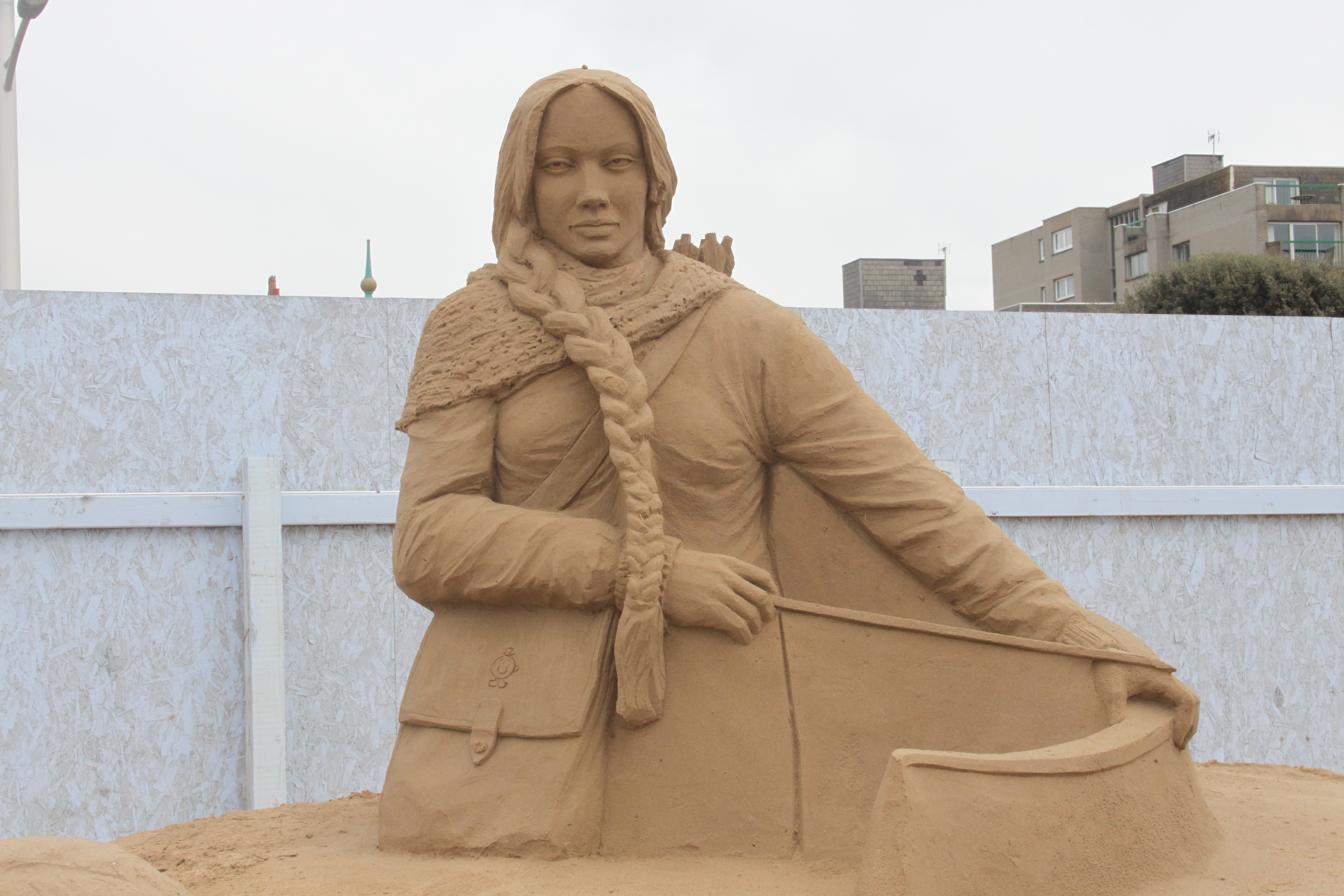
The Hunger Games by Marielle Heessels

The Weston-super-Mare Sand Sculpture Festival has been held annually since 2005 on the beach at Weston-super-Mare in the English county of Somerset. The festival has earned Weston the title of “Sand Sculpting Capital” of the UK.

The artists at the sand festival use sand and water to make sculptures. The exhibition is open from April until October each year.

The first festival in 2006 used 30 tonnes of sand, and featured a giant King Kong. By 2014 approximately 5,000 tonnes of sand from the beach was used by 20 international artists to create exhibits. North Somerset initially sponsored the event, however in 2012 they stopped their funding and alternative sponsors were sought. The 2013 festival was themed around Hollywood.

== 2014 festival ==
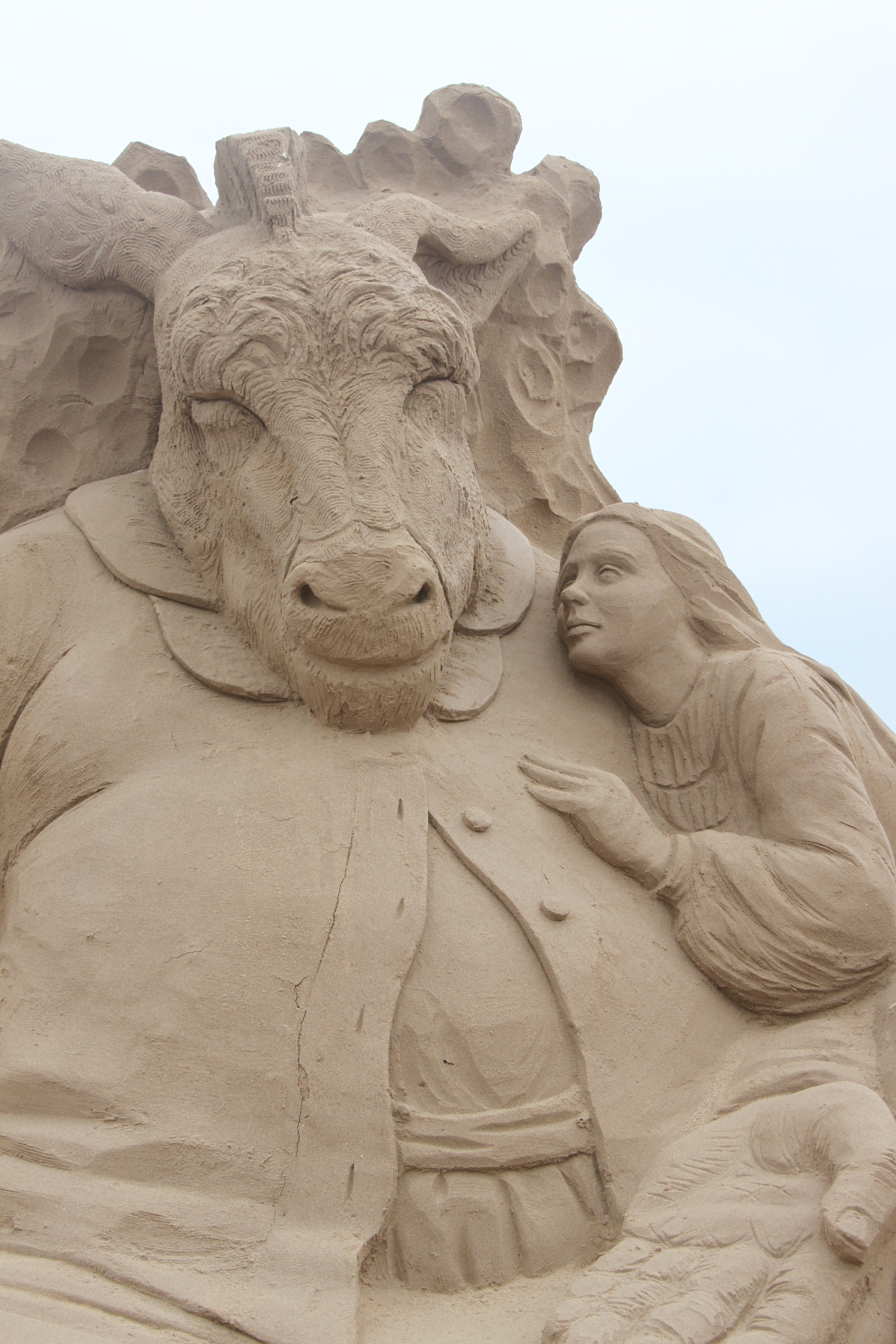
A Midsummer Nights Dream

The 2014 festival was based on the a theme of Once Upon a Time and included exhibits from traditional children's stories such as Beatrix Potter, Alice's Adventures in Wonderland, and The Chronicles of Narnia. It also included some which had recently been made into films such as Game of Thrones, The Hobbit and The Hunger Games.

£2,000 was donated for the development of art education at the site by the Town Council. Art students from Weston College assisted with some of the creation of the sculptures.

In May three of the 30 sculptures were damaged by vandals.
