= Goa Sand Art Festival =

The Goa Sand Art Festival is a three-day festival held at Candolim beach, which is one of the pristine beaches in Goa.

== GSAF 2009 ==
The Goa Sand Art Festival 2009 was the year of its inception. The theme for 2009 was Global Warming which was conveyed through six different sand sculptures. Each sand sculpture was like a campaign which highlighted the theme.

== GSAF 2010 ==
The highlight for GSAF 2010 was a theme park depicting wildlife conservation. Around 3 days prior to the main festival, the students and the artists from Mumbai, Pune and Goa began work on their creations, creating a unique theme park with different endangered species made completely out of sand.

== GSAF 2011 ==
The theme for Goa Sand Art Festival 2011 was “Marine Life – Unseen Treasures under Water”. People can witness some breath taking sand sculptures depicting the theme. In addition to other artists, this year Goa Sand Art Festival will feature one of the World Renowned Sand Sculptors from UK, Simon Smith-The Sand Wizard. A master of his trade, Simon's work of art have been commissioned and admired across the globe.

The main three day of the festival will showcase different Sand Art Forms like Sand Sculptures, Sand Dance and Sand Drawings. Those interested can also attend free workshop on Sand Art. Everyone are invited to try their hands on Sand Sculpting/Drawing/Writing Messages on sand or just playing with sand at the designated practice pit. This is not for competing with each other but for the love of art.

The artists will start work on their creations from Dec 10 onwards and the festival was open to the public from Dec 16 – Dec 18, 2011. Entry is free and all are welcome to enjoy this most eco-friendly form of art.
