= Robert Blake School =

Location
- Hamp Avenue; Bridgwater, Somerset, TA6 6AW; England; 51.1203°N 3.0040°W

Information
- Type: Foundation school
- Motto: Aspire Achieve Celebrate
- Established: 1956
- Local authority: Somerset County Council
- Department for Education URN: 123878 Tables
- Ofsted: Reports
- Chair: R Cheetham
- Headteacher: current headteacher unknown as off summer break 2026
- Gender: Mixed
- Age: 11 to 16
- Enrolment: 1000+
- Houses: Quantock; Mendip; Blackdown; Polden
- Website: http://www.robertblake.org.uk/

Robert Blake School, formerly Robert Blake Science College, is a mixed secondary school in Bridgwater, Somerset, England.

The school, which was established in 1956, has specialist Science College status, has 719 students between the ages of 11 and 16.

The school is named after Robert Blake (1599 — 17 August 1657), one of the most important military commanders of the Commonwealth of England, and one of the most famous English admirals of the 17th century, who was born in Bridgwater.

Bridgwater was selected as the first town in the South West level to be selected for the UK governments Building Schools for the Future initiative, which aimed to rebuild and renew nearly every secondary school in England. Within Bridgwater, Building Schools for the Future was to develop all of the 4 secondary schools along with 2 special provision schools, Elmwood School and Penrose School at an expected cost of around £100 Million. This included the complete relocation and rebuilding of a new school combining both the Haygrove and Penrose Schools.

In July 2010 several components of the scheme for Bridgwater schools were cancelled and others were still under discussion.

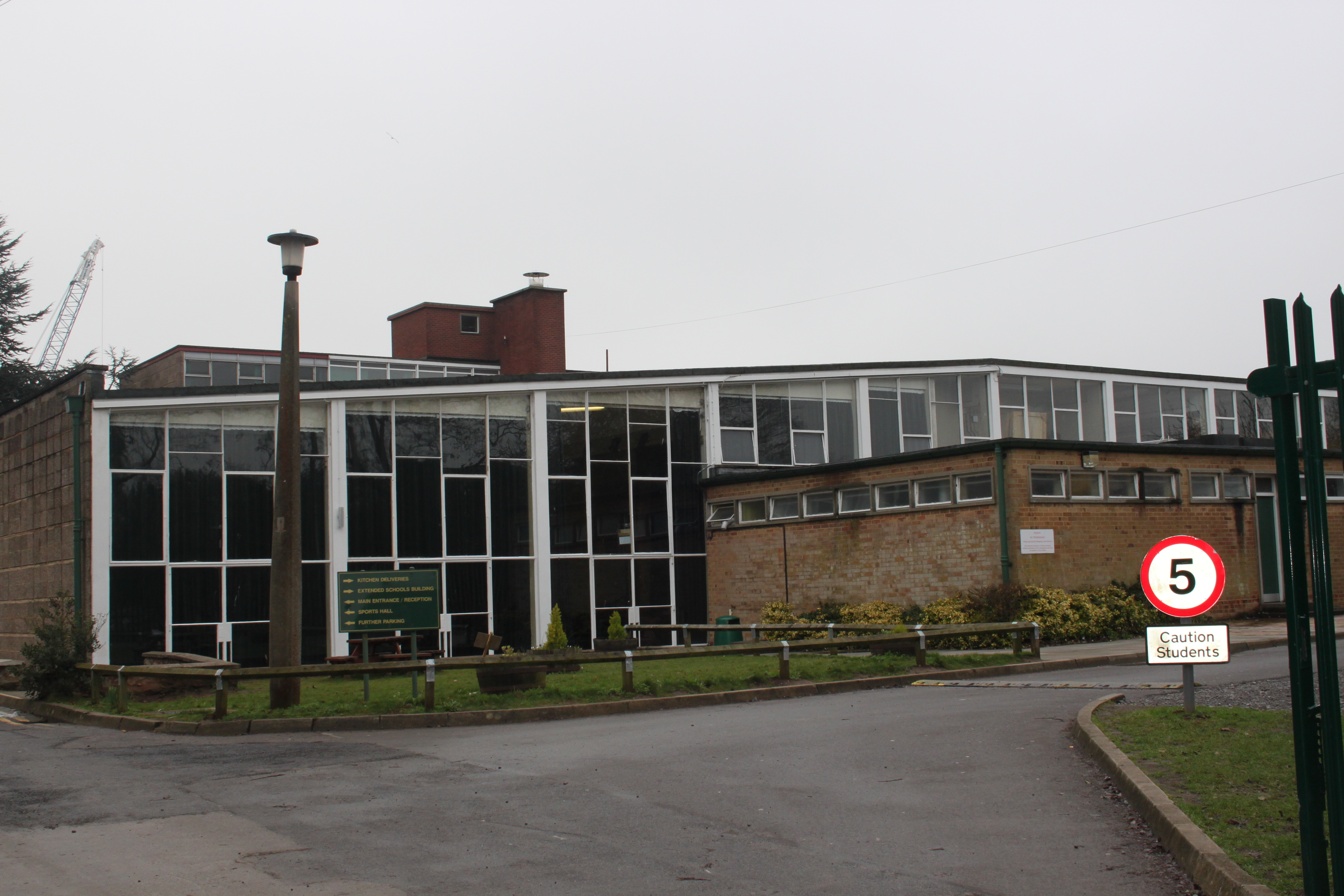
Robert Blake Science College in 2011
