= The Brewhouse Theatre & Arts Centre =

Theatre and arts centre in Taunton, England

Taunton Brewhouse
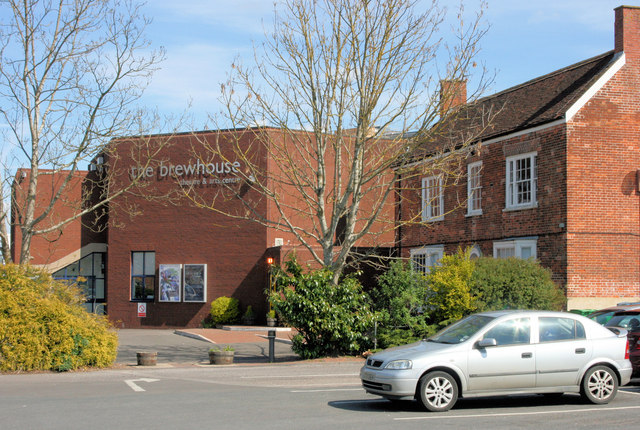
- The theatre and to the right, administrative offices in the old Georgian brew house.
- Interactive map of Taunton Brewhouse
- Former names: The Brewhouse; The Brewhouse Theatre & Arts Centre
- Address: Coal Orchard, Taunton, Somerset, TA1 1JL; Taunton; England
- Coordinates: 51.0181°N 3.1022°W
- Owner: Somerset Council
- Capacity: 352
- Type: Provincial
- Designation: The Georgian brew house is a Listed Building Grade II
- Current use: Theatre and arts centre

Construction
- Opened: 1977
- Closed: February 2013 - April 2014
- Years active: 1977 - Present

Website
- https://www.tauntonbrewhouse.co.uk/

Taunton Brewhouse (previously The Brewhouse) is the largest theatre and arts centre in Taunton, the county town of Somerset, England.

The theatre opened on 28 March 1977, on the banks of the River Tone, and offers a 352-seat auditorium, a 60-seat studio space for performances, classes and conferences, and an exhibition space. It hosts a programme of live professional and amateur theatre productions; live folk, rock, and pop music; comedians; popular and independent cinema; live broadcasts from major international venues, such as London's National Theatre and The Royal Opera House; and visual arts exhibitions.

Its first professional production was Alan Ayckbourn’s The Norman Conquests, starring the then-unknown David Jason.

At the end of October 2026 the theatre closed due to financial difficulties.

== Building ==
=== Main Auditorium ===
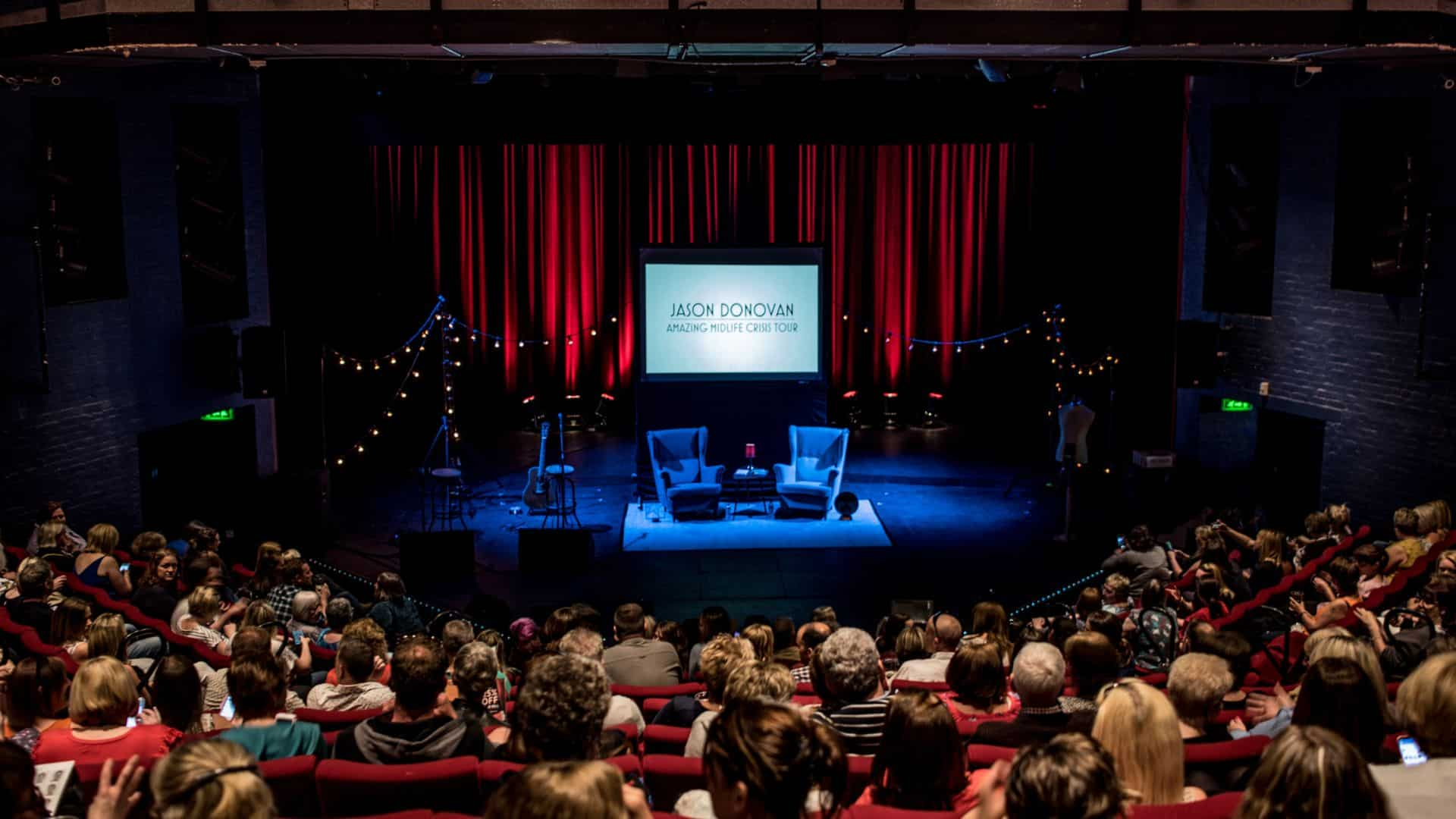
The Brewhouse main auditorium during a Jason Donavan show.

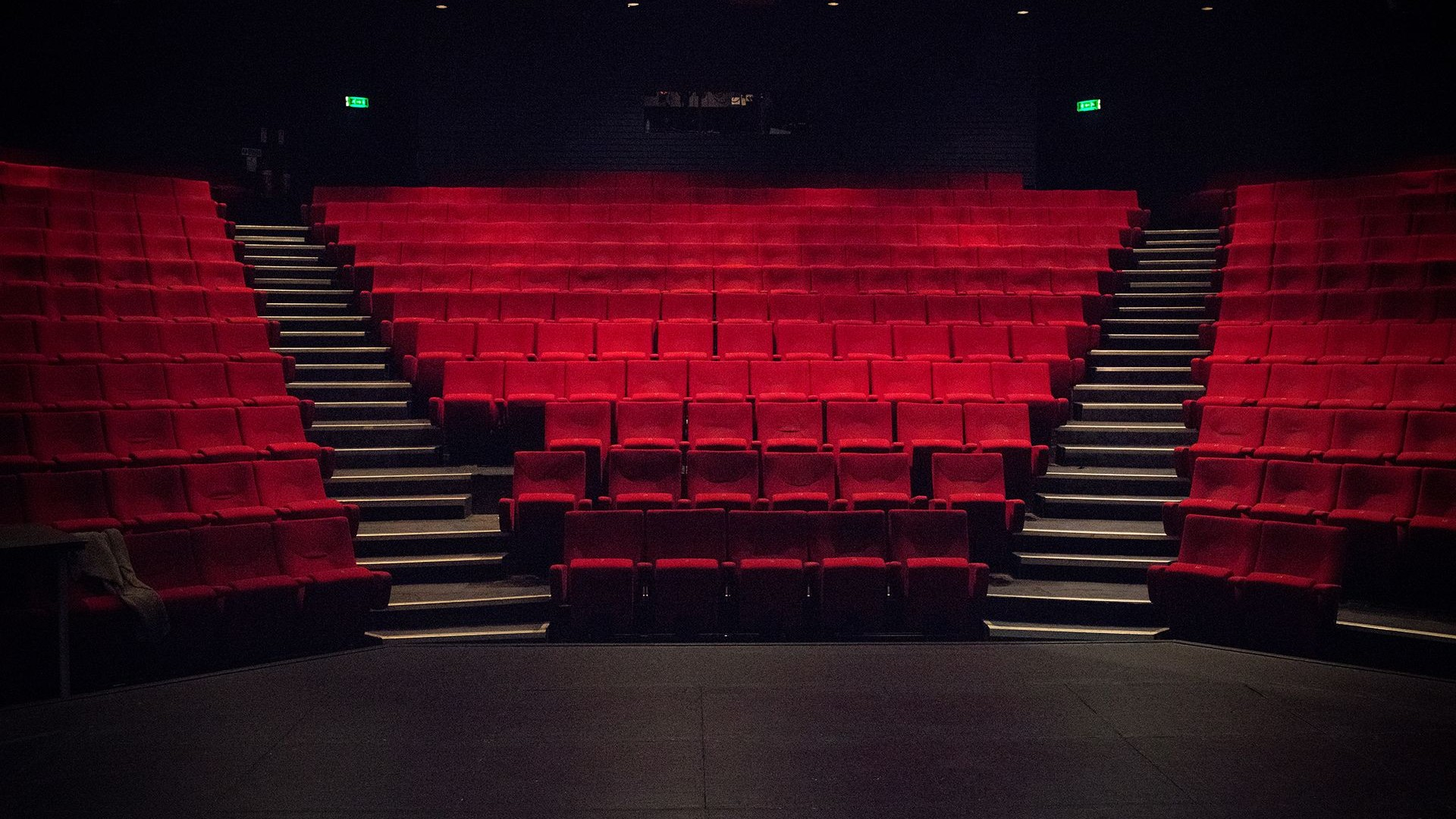
View of the main house seating from the stage.

The main house is a proscenium arch theatre with a trapezoidal apron, which can be reconfigured to include a central vomitorium, and includes a flexible orchestra pit.

=== Studio Theatre ===
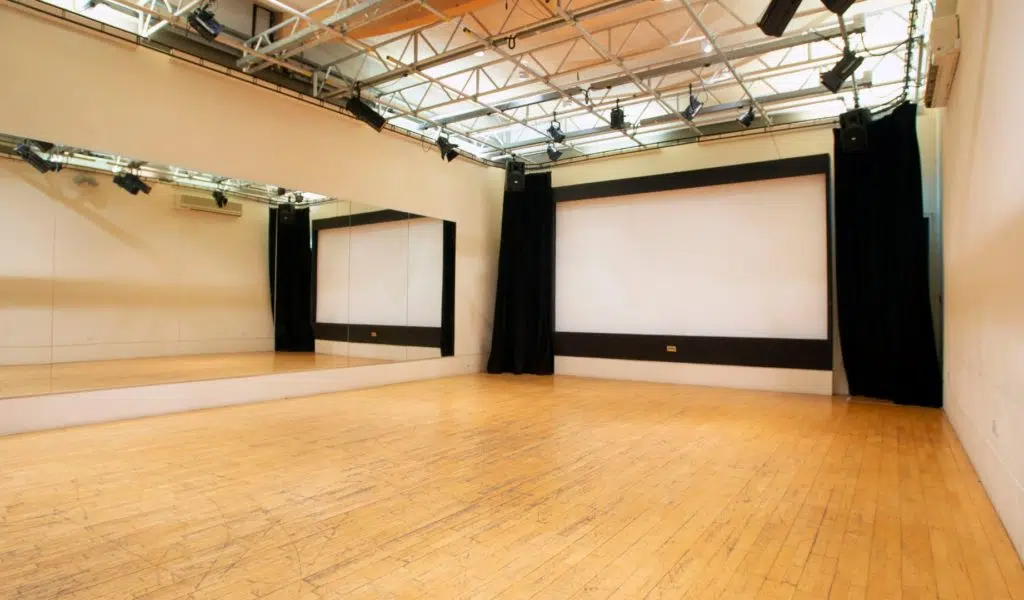
The Studio Theatre

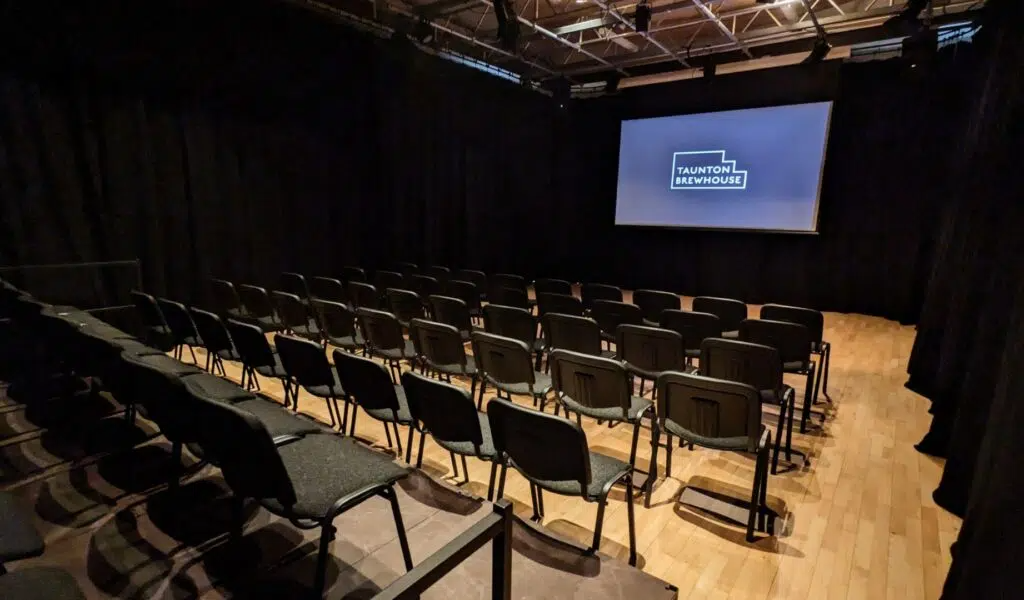
The Brewhouse studio theatre with seating

The Studio Theatre is a fully equipped performance space with black-out and conference facilities. Removable seating can host up to 60 with playing space for an end-on show, or larger groups for meetings and other events. Workshops and classes benefit from the sprung floor and mirror wall.

The Studio Theatre was fully renovated in 2023 thanks to a grant from Theatres Trust.

=== Creative Hub ===
This adaptable teaching space hosts workshops, rehearsals, and classes. Located under the saw-tooth roof of the modern wing, the Creative Hub receives natural light and includes sink facilities. For large group hires of performance spaces, it can also serve as an additional backstage or breakout room.

=== Gallery ===
The Gallery is a white cube with high ceilings, natural light and black-out facility used for exhibiting visual arts, film, photography and sculpture.

=== Brewery House ===
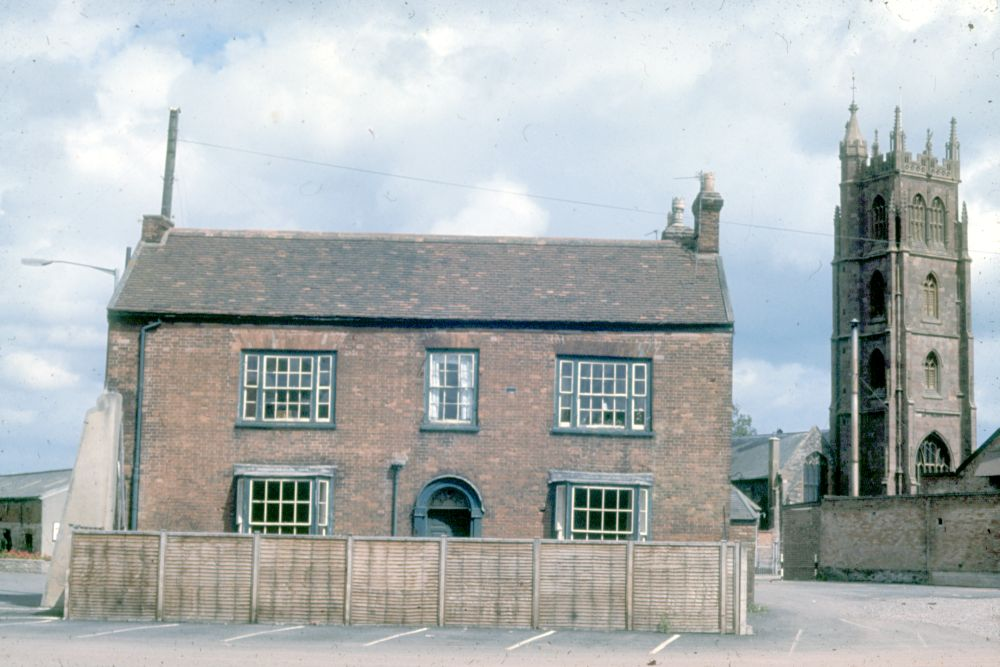
The Brewery house in 1974, before work started on The Brewhouse Theatre

The Westward Room and administrative offices are located in the Old Brewery house, a Georgian Grade II listed building, which gives the theatre its name.

== Funding ==
Like many provincial theatres, the Brewhouse Theatre has suffered several financial setbacks over the years.

In 2005, Arts Council England announced that it would cut regular funding to The Brewhouse from 2006, following a drop in artistic output. In September 2005 a new director Robert Miles was appointed to lead the artistic re-invigoration of the organisation. It was also the first theatre, apart from the Royal Court Theatre, to stage Caryl Churchill's controversial play Seven Jewish Children.

In 2009, ongoing under funding, combined with the impact of recession and a subsequent threat of cuts meant the venue was once again put under threat of closure. With support from its stakeholders Taunton Brewhouse overcame these immediate funding concerns, and in March 2010 it was announced that the organisation had been awarded £487,500 from Arts Council England's Sustain fund to allow it to continue to programme arts and participatory activities during the economic downturn.

However despite this local success, Somerset County Council completely cut their arts funding by 100%. The venue subsequently closed in February 2013 and went into administration.

The venue reopened in April 2014 by independent arts charity Taunton Theatre Association Ltd (TTA), having been granted the lease from Taunton Deane Borough Council, who bought the 61-year lease of the site and its contents from administrator BDO.

In 2020 Taunton Theatre Association were awarded a significant grant as part of the Government’s Culture Recovery Fund.

In 2024 Somerset Council cut all of its funding for the theatre. The theatre issued a statement confirming that it is working closely with both Somerset Council and Taunton Town Council to develop a plan for long-term sustainability.

== Closure in 2026 ==
On 21 September 2026 the theatre issued a statement saying that it may have to close unless additional funding could be found.

The Taunton Theatre Association set up an appeal for pledges of support, aiming to raise £150,000, but just a week later the theatre announced that it would close, at the end of October.

The theatre closed on 31 October 2026 and all 23 employees of the Taunton Theatre Association were made redundant. Media reports laid the blame for the closure primarily on the withdrawal of £132,000 funding from Somerset Council

An organisation called the Brewhouse Community Trust was set up following the closure, with the aim of reopening the theatre. The trust includes representatives from local theatre groups including the Taunton Thespians and the Wayfarer's Pantomime Society.

== History ==
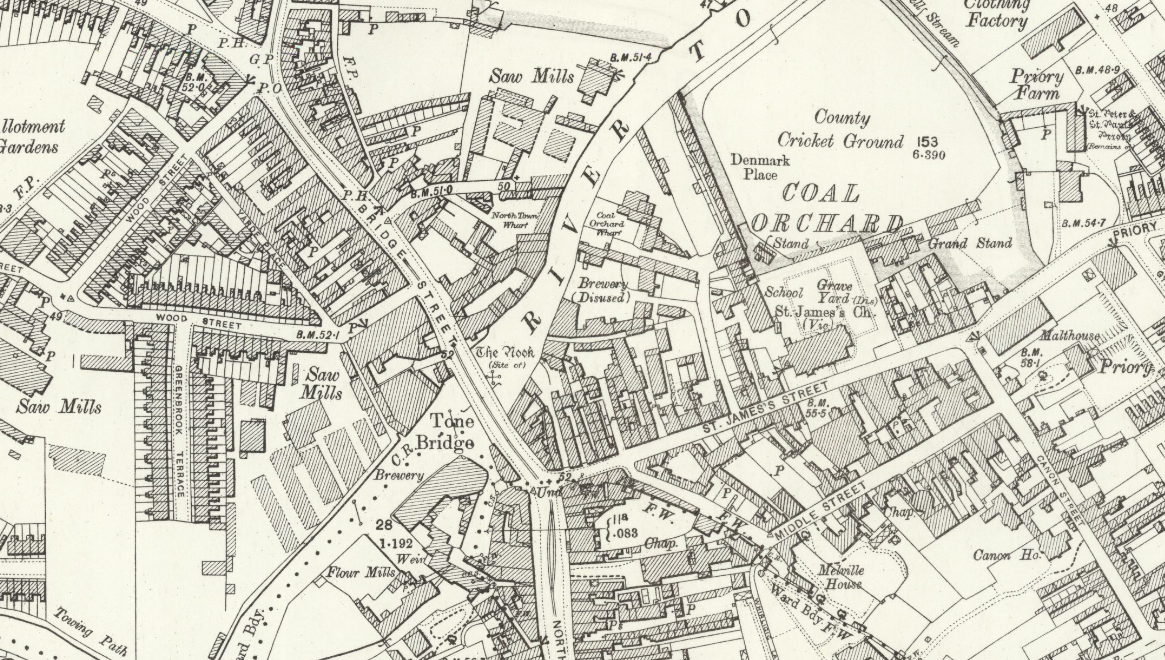
Coal Orchard Area Map - 1904

The area on which the Brewhouse Theatre stands was known as Coal Orchard, due to its use as an orchard and as a location where coal was unloaded on the bank of the River Tone. In the 19th and early 20th centuries, the site was used as a brewery.

A campaign to establish a theatre in Taunton was launched in the 1970s, led by John Wilkins, secretary of the Taunton Theatre Trust.

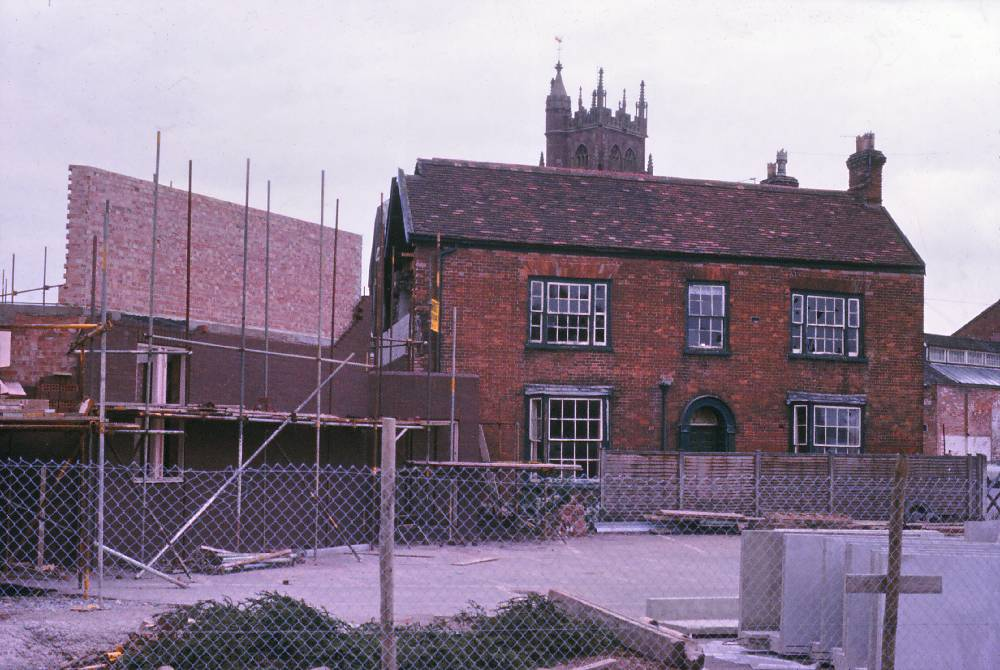
The Brewhouse during its construction in 1975.

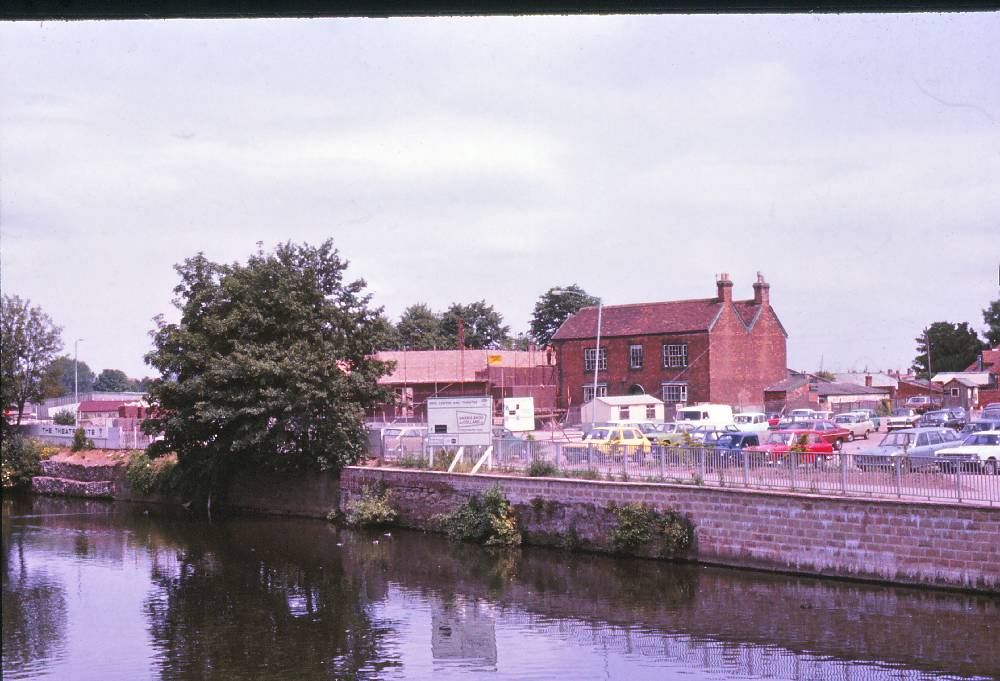
A view across the River Tone during the construction of The Brewhouse.

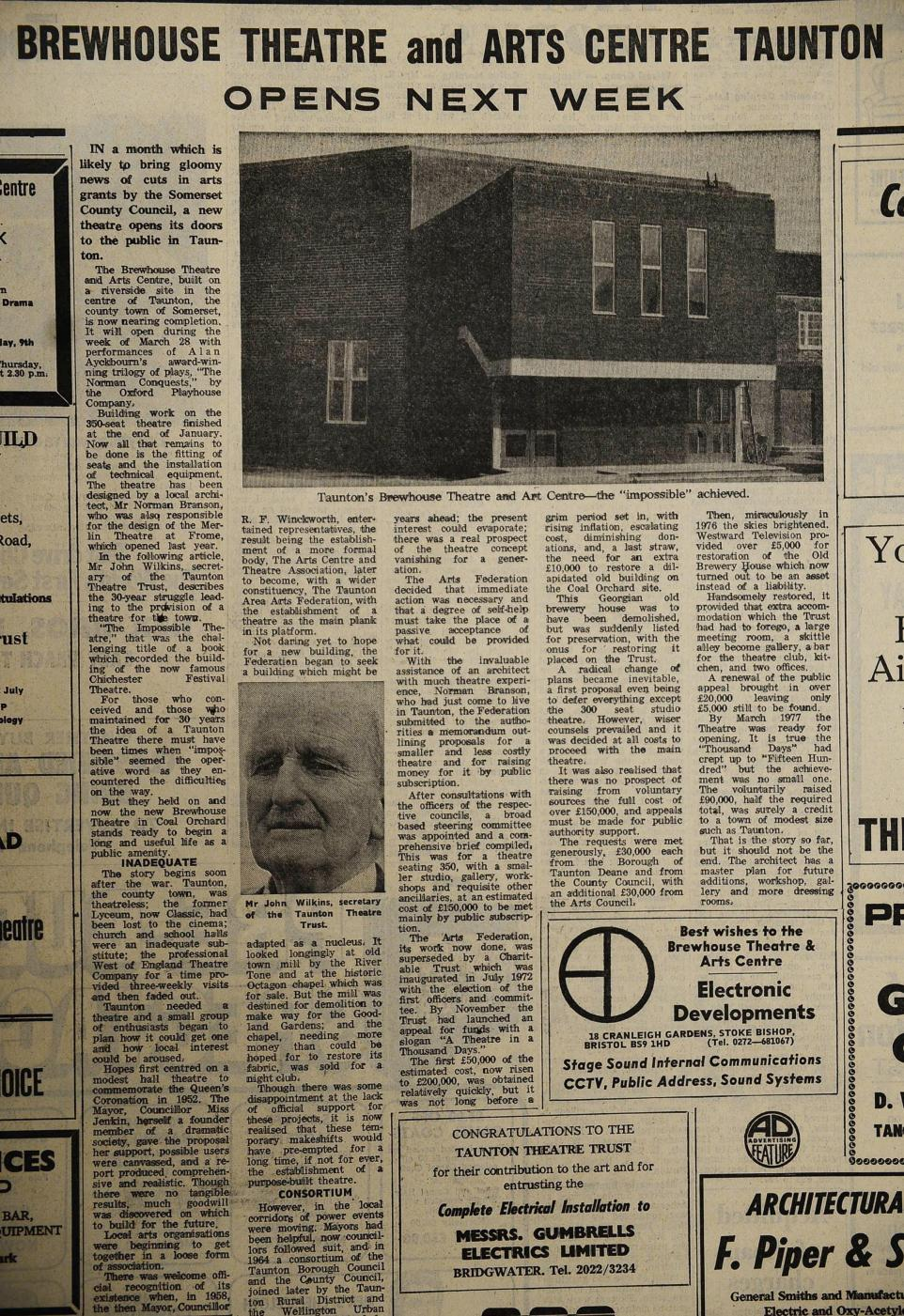
March 23rd 1977 Gazette Article

In 1975, the premises were leased to the Taunton Theatre Trust. After a lengthy period of fundraising, construction of the new theatre began, alongside the Old Brewery House. The building was designed by a local architect, Norman Branson, who also designed the Merlin Theatre in Frome. The design featured brown bricks and concrete dressings to complement the historic Old Brewery House. The theatre opened in 1977.
