= Doron =

Doron (Hebrew: דורון) may refer to:

== People ==
=== Given name ===
- Doron Almog (born 1951), Israeli soldier
- Doron Ben-Ami (born 1965), Israeli archaeologist
- Doron Cohen (born 1964), Israeli journalist, editor-in-chief of Maariv
- Doron Egozi (born 1980), Israeli sport shooter
- Doron Galezer (born 1952), Israeli journalist
- Doron Gazit (born 1953), Israeli environmental artist, activist and industrial designer
- Doron Gepner (born 1956), Israeli theoretical physicist
- Doron Jamchi (born 1961), Israeli basketball player
- Doron Kliger, professor
- Doron Lamb (born 1991), American basketball player
- Doron Matalon (born 1993), Miss Israel 2014
- Doron Nesher (born 1954) Israeli actor, writer, screenwriter, poet, director, comedian, radio broadcaster and television host
- Doron Perkins (born 1983), American basketball player
- Doron Shefa (born 1961), Israeli basketball player
- Doron Sheffer (born 1972), Israeli basketball player
- Doron Zeilberger (born 1950), Israeli mathematician

=== Surname ===
- Dina Doron, Israeli actress
- Helen Doron (born 1955), British linguist
- Shay Doron (born 1985), Israeli-American basketball player

== Other uses ==
- Doron (Pliny), an ancient city located in Cilicia Trachea which was mentioned only by Pliny the Elder
- Doron Kabilio, a character in the Israeli television series Fauda
- Doron plate, a type of body armor employed in World War II
