= Douro =

River in Portugal and Spain

Douro Duero (Spanish) Douro (Mirandese)
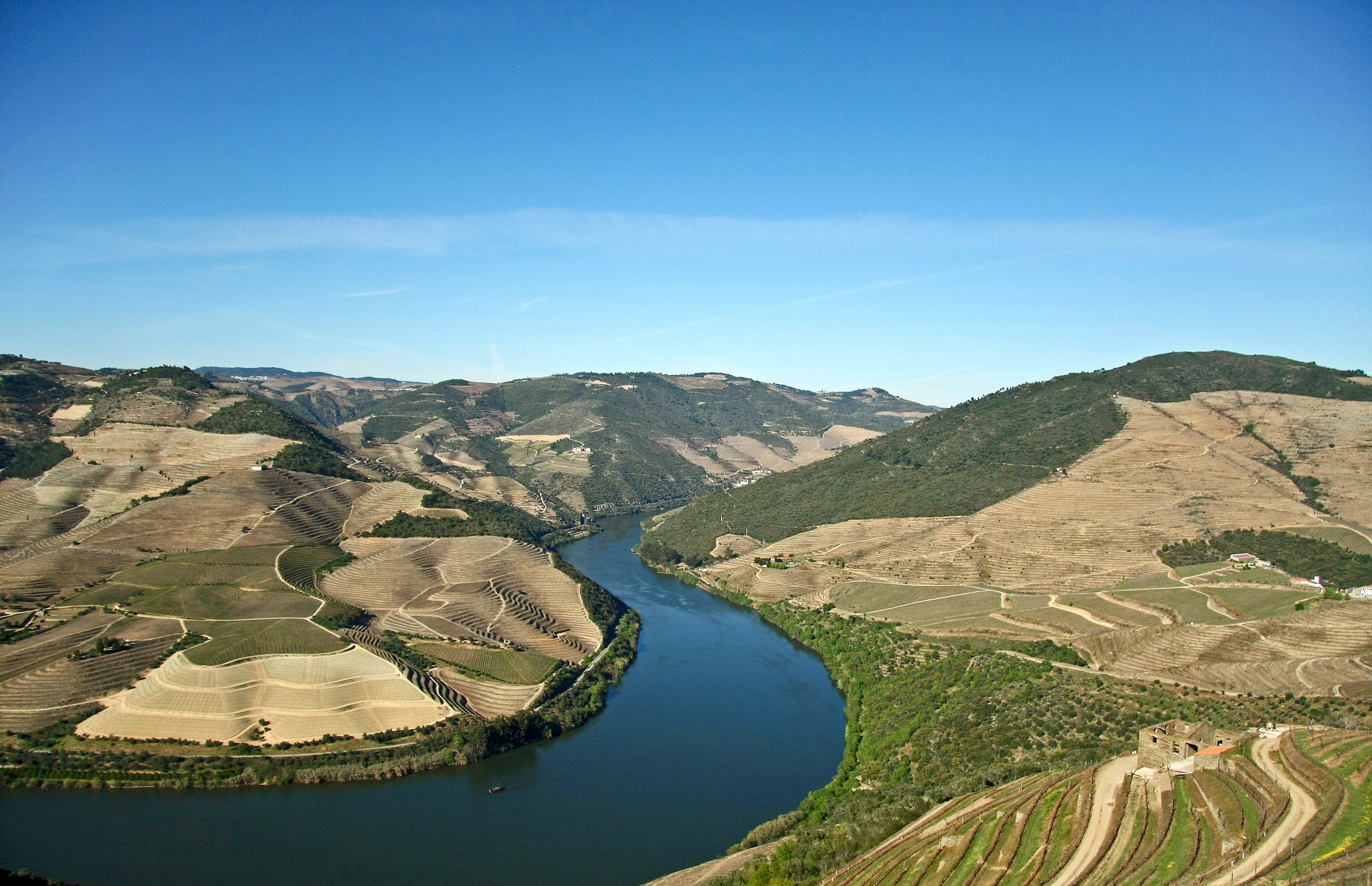
- The river flowing through the Portuguese wine region, designated as a World Heritage Site.

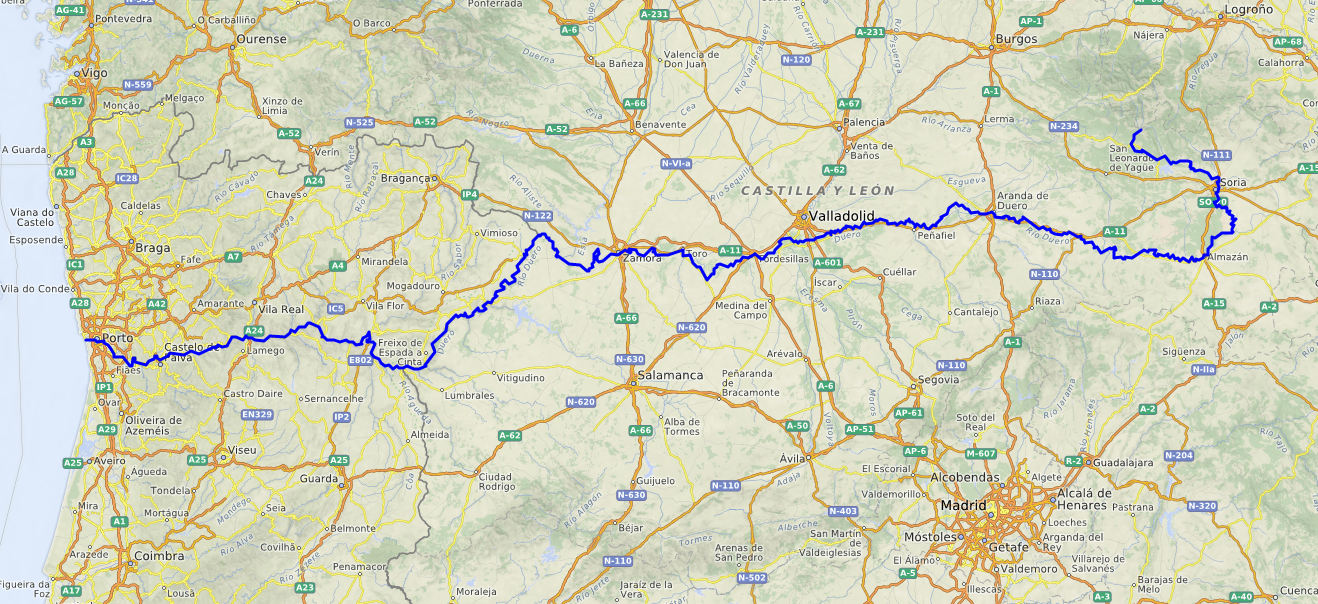

Location
- Country: Spain, Portugal

Physical characteristics
- Source: Picos de Urbión
  - location: Sistema Ibérico, Duruelo de la Sierra, Soria, Castile and León, Spain
  - coordinates: 42°0′38″N 2°52′49″W
  - elevation: 2,157 m (7,077 ft)
- Mouth: Foz do Douro
  - location: Atlantic Ocean, Porto, Greater Porto, Norte, Portugal
  - coordinates: 41°8′36″N 8°40′10″W
  - elevation: 0 m (0 ft)
- Length: 897 km (557 mi)
- Basin size: 98,400 km^{2} (38,000 sq mi)
- Discharge
  - location: Porto
  - average: 700 m^{3}/s (25,000 cu ft/s)
  - maximum: 17,000 m^{3}/s (600,000 cu ft/s)
- Discharge
  - location: Pocinho
  - average: 442 m^{3}/s (15,600 cu ft/s)

Basin features
- Tributaries
  - left: Tera, Rituerto, Riaza, Duratón, Cega, Adaja, Tormes, Huebra, Águeda, Côa, Torto, Távora, Varosa, Bestança, Paiva, Arda, Inha
  - right: Pisuerga, Valderaduey, Esla, Sabor, Tua, Corgo, Tâmega, Sousa

The Douro (UK: /ˈdʊəroʊ, ˈdʊəruː/, US: /ˈdɔːruː, ˈdɔːroʊ/, Portuguese: [ˈdo(w)ɾu], Mirandese: [ˈdowɾʊ]; Spanish: Duero [ˈdweɾo]; Latin: Durius) is the largest river of the Iberian Peninsula by discharge. It rises at the Pico de Urbión, the highest summit of the Picos de Urbión, first flows through Duruelo de la Sierra in the Spanish province of Soria, meanders briefly south, then flows generally west through the northern part of the Meseta Central in Castile and León into northern Portugal. Its largest tributary (carrying more water than the Douro at their confluence) is the right-bank Esla. The Douro flows into the Atlantic Ocean at Porto, the second largest city of Portugal.

The scenic Douro railway line runs close to the river. Adjacent areas produce port (a mildly fortified wine) and other agricultural produce. A small tributary of the river has the Côa Valley Paleolithic Art site which is considered important to the archaeological pre-historic patrimony, designated a UNESCO World Heritage Site. Within Spain, it flows through the middle of the autonomous community of Castile and León, with the basin spanning through the northern half of the Meseta Central. The latter includes wine producing areas such as the Ribera del Duero DOP.

== Name ==
The Latin name Durius might have been a Celtic name before the overwhelming Romanization of Iberia. If so, the Celtic root could have been *dubro- (in that family of languages the final vowel sound often changes with context, as in Latin). However, were that the case, the -b-, of which there remains no trace, would not have disappeared, as evidenced by place-names derived from Gaulish *dubron (plural dubra), such as French Douvres and English Dover (3rd/4th-century Dubris; Douvres in French), Spanish Dobra, German Tauber (Dubra-gave 807), and Gaelic/Old Irish dobur "water" and river name Dobhar in Ireland and Scotland. Modern Welsh dŵr "water" is cognate with modern Breton dour and Cornish dur "water" and results from a later typical Brittonic evolution of *dubro-, unknown in the Continental Celtic languages.

The possible origin is the hydronymic root *dur-, which is Pre-Indo-European or Pre-Celtic. Albert Dauzat linked this river name to a Pre-Celtic hydronymic root *dor-, which is well attested in Western Europe: in France Doire, Doron, Douron, etc. and in Italy Dora, etc. The meaning of this element is, however, unknown.

A folk-etymological derivation suggests that the name comes from the Portuguese or Spanish term for "golden".

== History ==
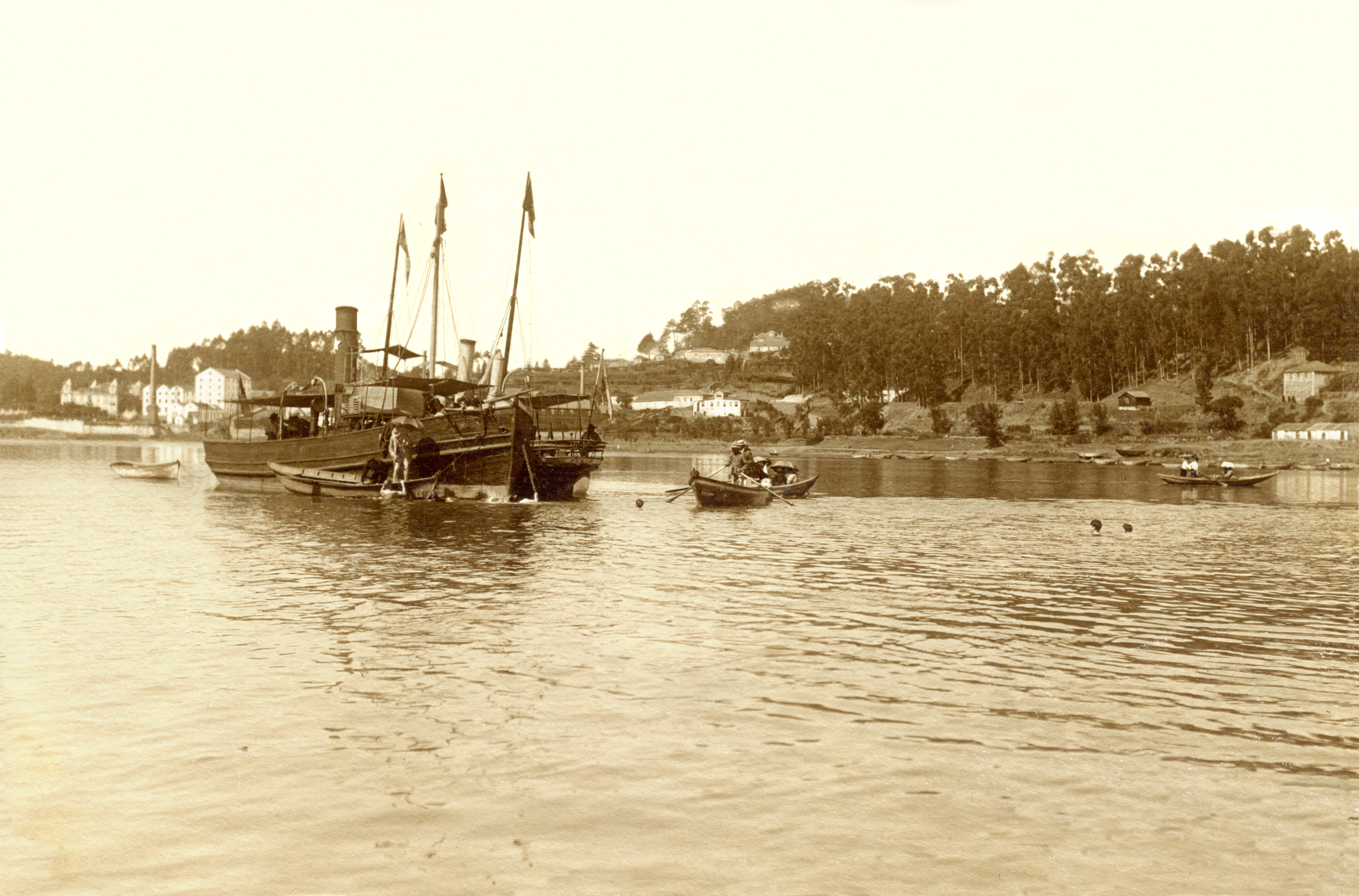
A 1908 image of boats along the Douro River

In Roman times, the river was personified as the god Durius.

Part of the drainage basin might have been severely depopulated in the 8th century. According to Claudio Sánchez-Albornoz this was a deliberate act by Alfonso I of Asturias for the defence of his Kingdom, which led the area to be named Repoblación.

The Douro vinhateiro ("vine-land") of the Douro Valley in Portugal, long devoted to vineyards, has been designated by UNESCO as a World Heritage Site. The wine was taken downriver in flat-bottom boats called rabelos, to be stored in barrels in cellars in Vila Nova de Gaia, just across the river from Porto. Nowadays port wine is transported there in tanker trucks.

In the 1960s and 1970s, dams with locks were built along the river, allowing river traffic into the upper regions in Spain and along the border.

In 1998, Portugal and Spain signed the Albufeira Convention, an agreement on the sharing of trans-boundary rivers to include the Douro, Tagus and Guadiana. The convention superseded an agreement on the Douro, signed in 1927, that was expanded in 1964 and 1968 to include tributaries.

== Geography ==
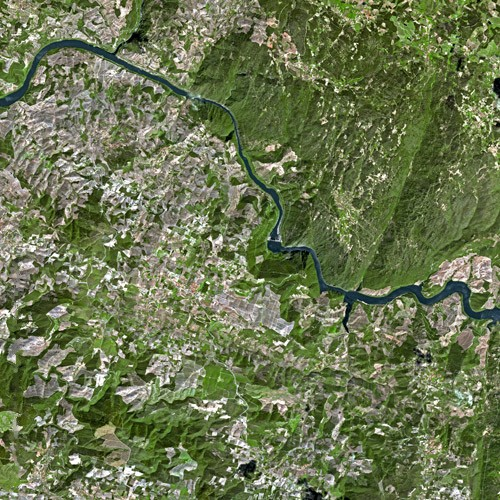
A SPOT Satellite image of the Douro River

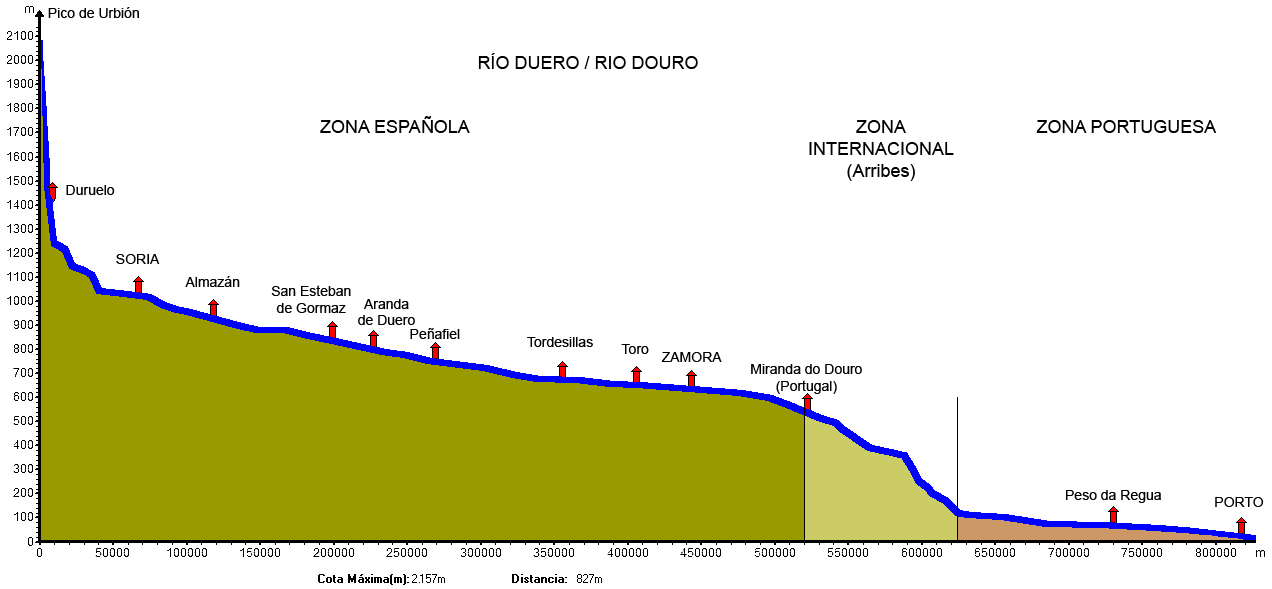
Profile of the Douro River, from its source in the mountains of the Sistema Ibérico to Foz do Douro

It is the third-longest river in the Iberian Peninsula after the Tagus and Ebro. Its total length is 897 km (557 mi), of which only stretches of the Portuguese section, being below a fall/rapids line, are naturally navigable, by modest rivercraft. The Douro River basin encompasses an area of approximately 97,290 km^{2} (37,560 sq mi).

In its Spanish section, the Douro crosses the great Castilian meseta and meanders through five provinces of the autonomous community of Castile and León: Soria, Burgos, Valladolid, Zamora, and Salamanca, passing through the towns of Soria, Almazán, Aranda de Duero, Tordesillas, and Zamora.

The most important tributaries in this region are the Pisuerga, passing through Valladolid, and the Esla, which passes through Zamora. This region is generally semi-arid plains, with wheat and in some places, especially near Aranda de Duero, with vineyards, in the Ribera del Duero wine region. Sheep rearing is also important.

The drainage basin borders those of Miño to the north, Ebro to the east, and Tajo to the south.

For 112 kilometres (70 mi), the river forms part of the border between Spain and Portugal, in a region of narrow canyons. It formed a historical barrier to invasions, creating a cultural/linguistic divide. In these isolated areas, in which the Aldeadávila Dam impounds the river, there are protected areas: the International Douro Natural Park (on the Portuguese side) and the Arribes del Duero Natural Park (on the Zamoran margin).

The Douro fully enters Portuguese territory just after the confluence with the Águeda River; once the Douro enters Portugal, major population centres are less frequent along the river. Except for Porto and Vila Nova de Gaia at the river mouth, the only population centres of any note are Foz do Tua, Pinhão and Peso da Régua. Tributaries here are small, merging into the Douro along the canyons; the most important are Côa, Tua, Sabor, Corgo, Tavora, Paiva, Tâmega, and Sousa. None of these small, fast-flowing rivers is navigable.

=== Human geography ===
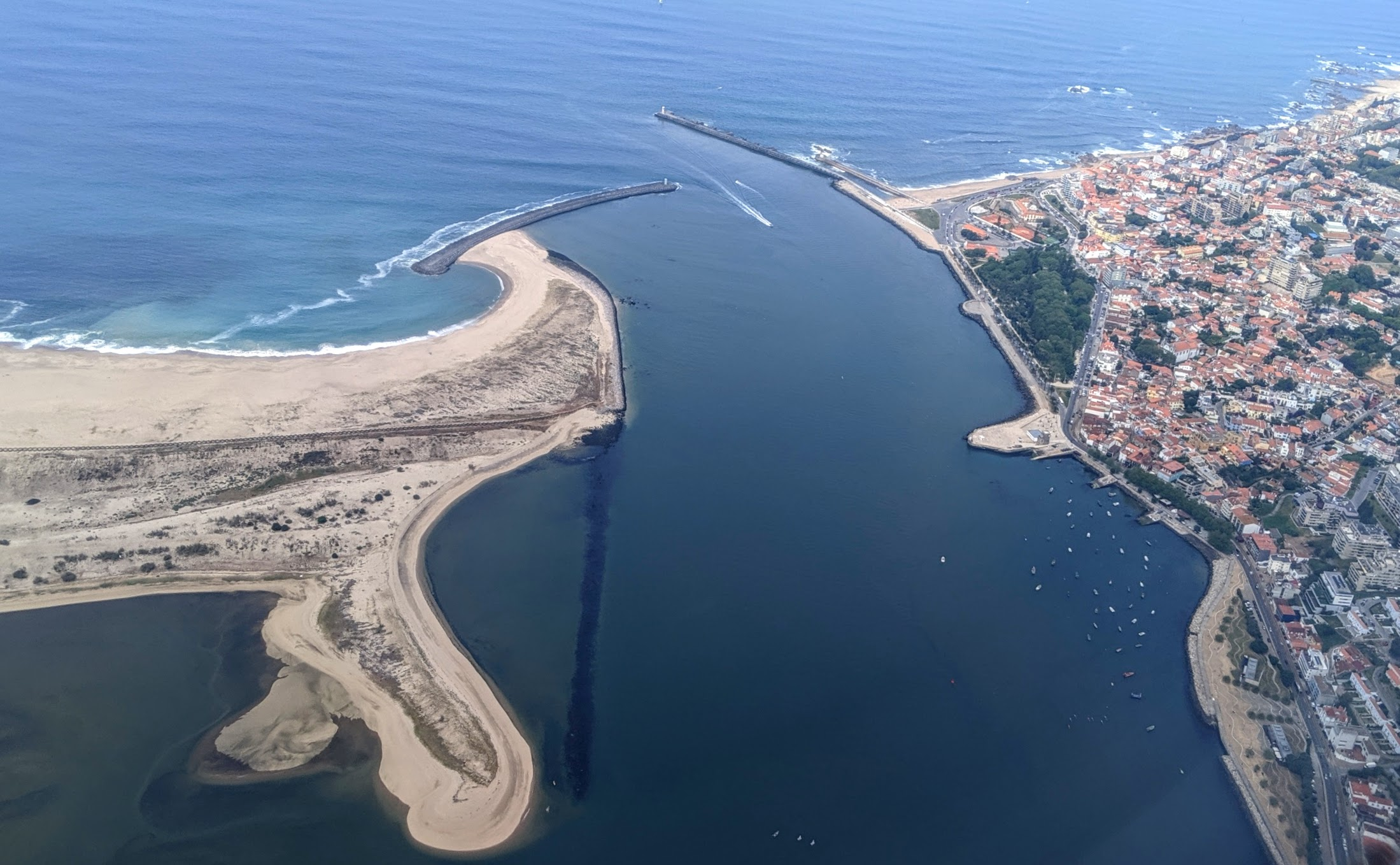
Aerial view of the Douro estuary, Porto

Major Spanish riverside towns include Soria, Almazán, Aranda de Duero, Tordesillas, Zamora and major Portuguese towns include Miranda do Douro, Foz Côa, Peso da Régua, Lamego, Vila Nova de Gaia, and Porto. The most populous cities along the Douro River are Valladolid and Zamora in Spain, and Porto and Vila Nova de Gaia in Portugal. The latter two are located at the mouth of the Douro at the Atlantic Ocean.

In Portugal, the Douro flows through the districts of Bragança, Guarda, Viseu, Vila Real, Aveiro and Porto. Porto is the main hub city in northern Portugal. Its historic centre has been designated as a UNESCO World Heritage Site because of its significant architecture and history.

== Economy ==
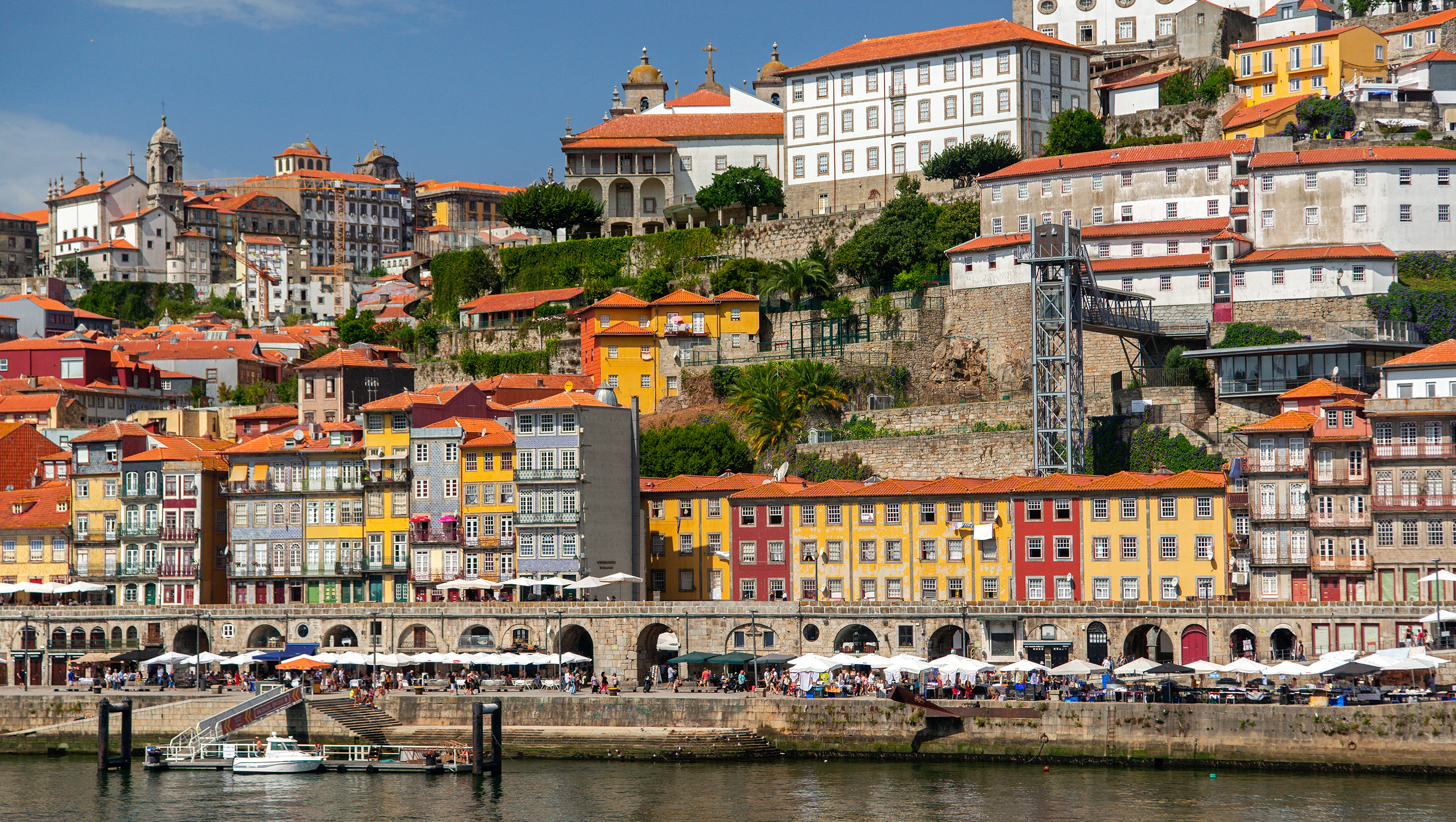
The Ribeira (meaning riverside). Its tall, colourful-building terraces is the main part of the river bank in the major city of Porto; it attracts numerous tourists

These reaches of the Douro have a mesoclimate allowing for cultivation of olives, almonds, and especially grapes, which are important for making port. The region around Pinhão and São João da Pesqueira is considered to be the centre of port, with its quintas (or farms/estates) that extend along the steep slopes of the river valleys. In the 21st century, many of these are owned by multinational, reputed wine companies.

Recently, a prosperous tourist industry has developed based on river excursions from Porto to points along the Upper Douro valley.

The Douro railway line (Linha do Douro) was completed in 1887; it connects Porto, Rio Tinto, Ermesinde, Valongo, Paredes, Penafiel, Livração, Marco de Canaveses, Régua, Tua and Pocinho.

Pocinho is near the very small city of Foz Côa, which is close to Côa Valley Paleolithic Art site. This is considered important to the archaeological pre-historic patrimony, and it has been designated as a UNESCO World Heritage Site.

=== Dams ===
Fifteen dams have been built on the Douro to regulate the water flow, generate hydroelectric power, and allow navigation through locks. Beginning at the headwaters, the first five dams are in Spain: Cuerda del Pozo, Los Rábanos, San José, Villalcampo and Castro Dams. The next five downstream are along the Portuguese-Spanish border; the first three are owned and operated by Portugal: (Miranda, Picote and Bemposta Dams), while the next two belong to Spain: (Aldeadávila and Saucelle Dams).

The Douro's last five dams are in Portugal, and allow for navigation: Pocinho, Valeira, Régua, Carrapatelo, and Crestuma–Lever dams. Vessels with a maximum length of 83 m (272 ft 4 in) and width of 11.4 m (37 ft 5 in) can pass through the five locks. The highest lock, at Carrapatelo Dam, has a maximum lift of 35 m (114 ft 10 in). The waters of Pocinho lake reach 125 metres (410 ft 1 in) above sea level. Unannounced releases of water from upstream Spanish dams occasionally causes navigation issues in these locks.

== Gallery ==
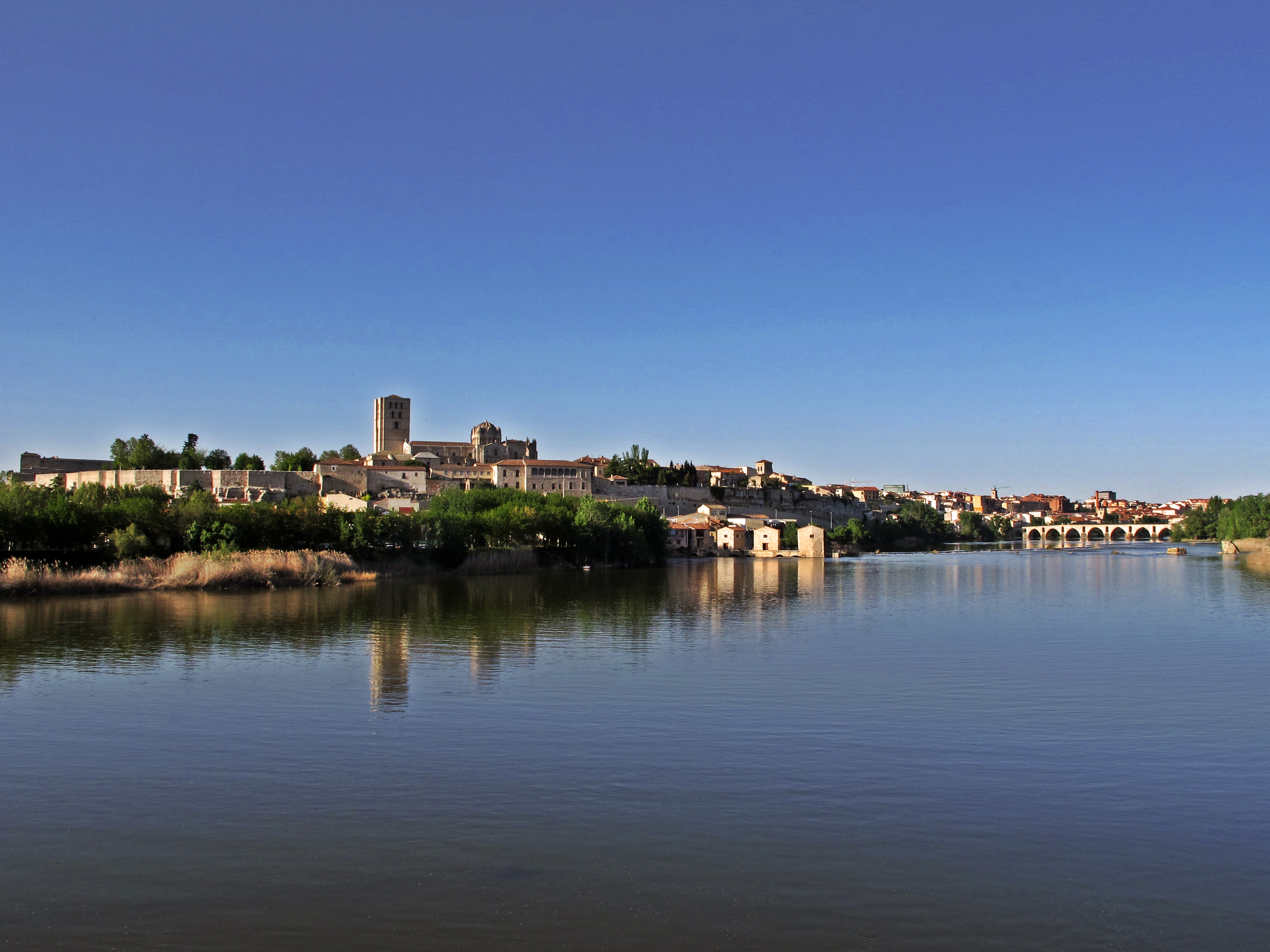
The Douro in Zamora (Spain)

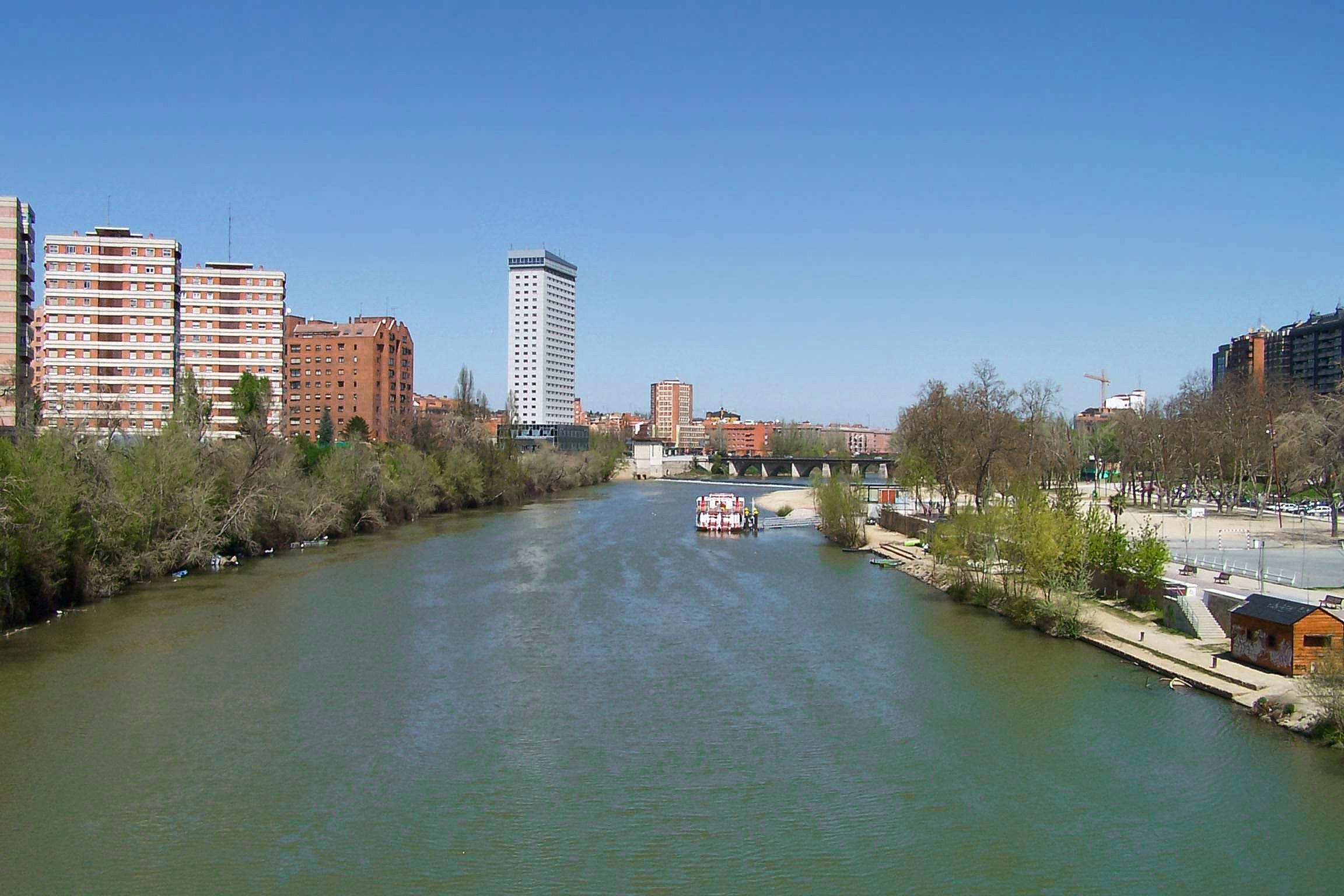
The Pisuerga River (tributary to the Duero) in Valladolid

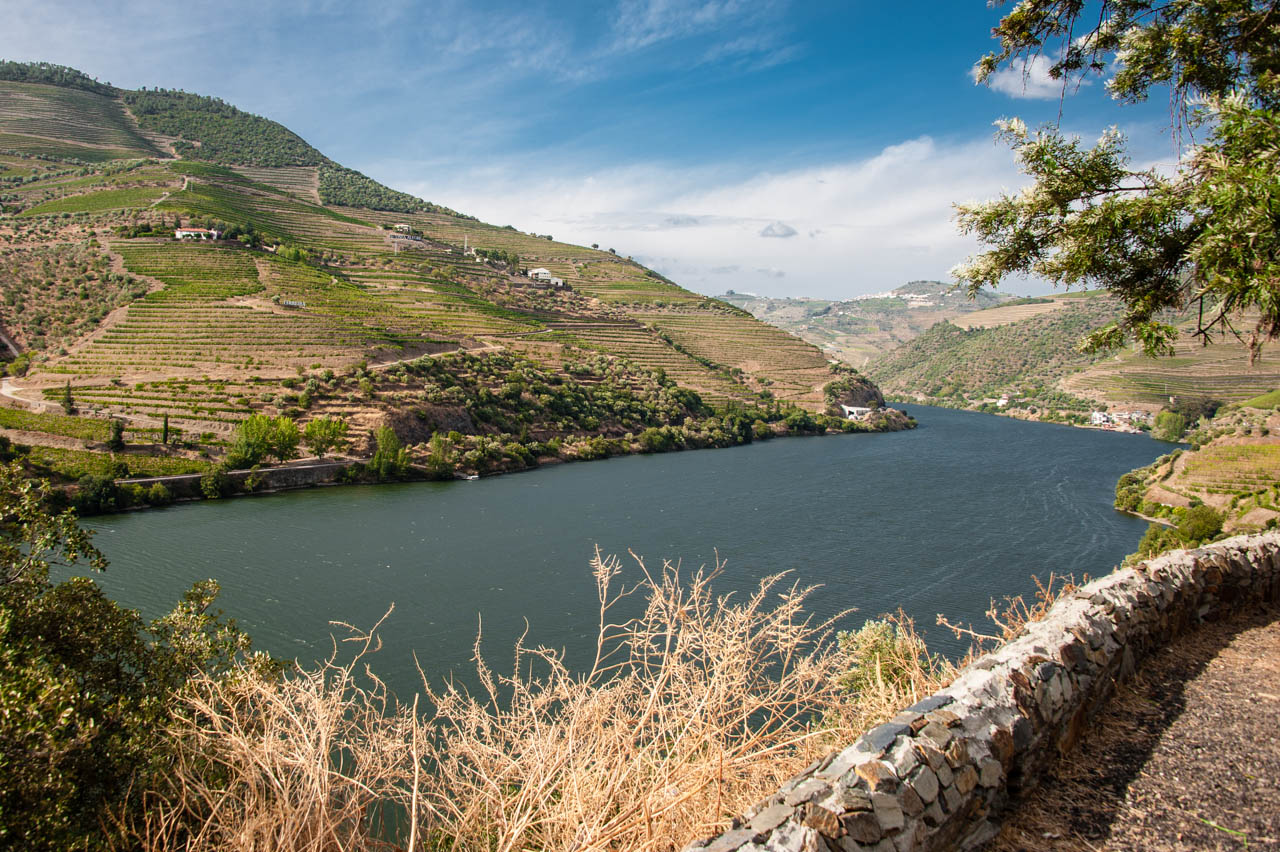
The Upper Douro valley where Port wine grapes grow

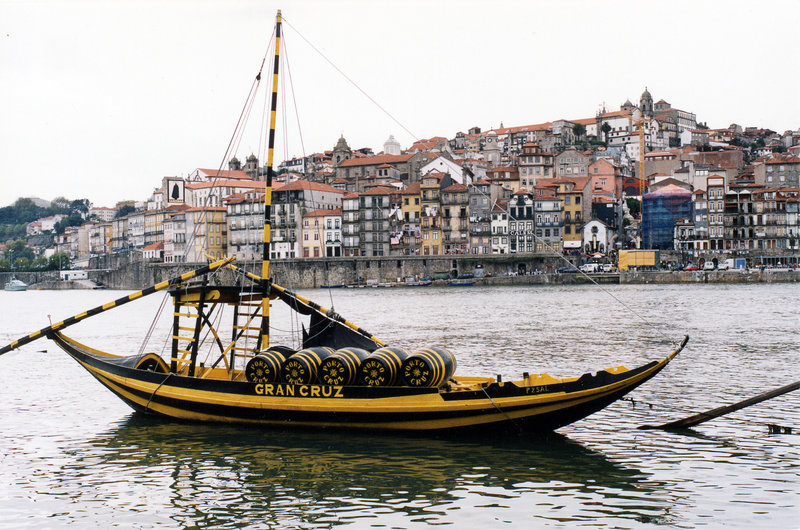
The typical rabelo boat and Porto historical district in background

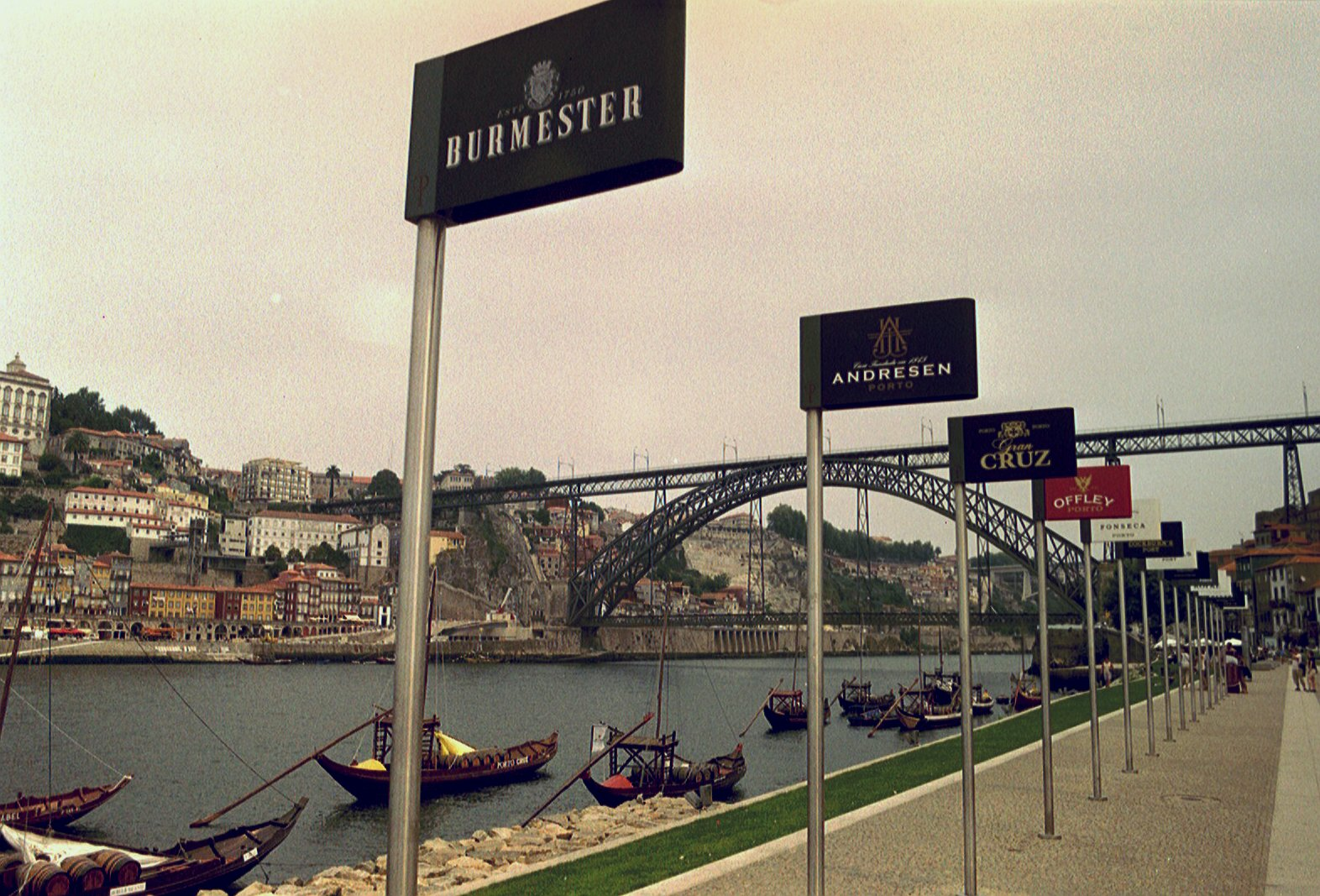
Port wine signs by the Douro River

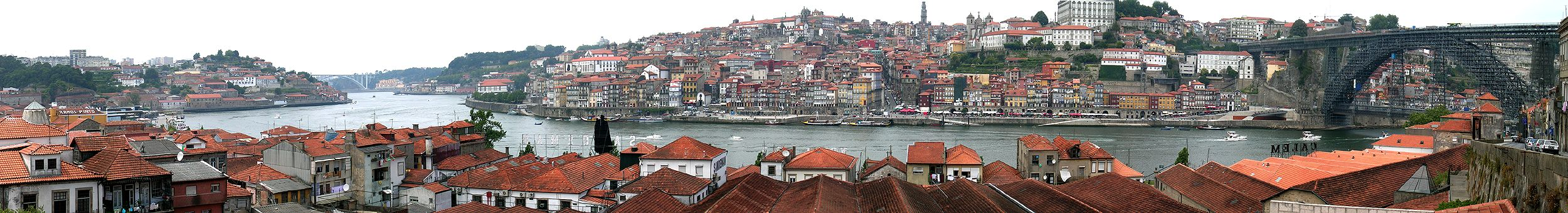
Panoramic view of Porto

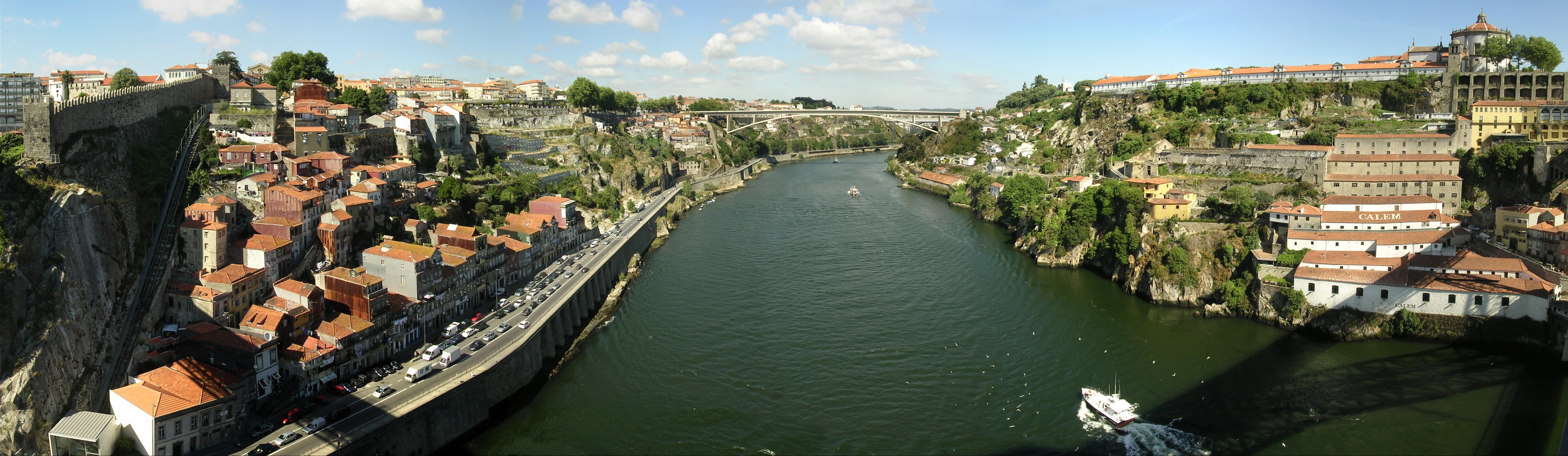
The river between Porto and Vila Nova de Gaia

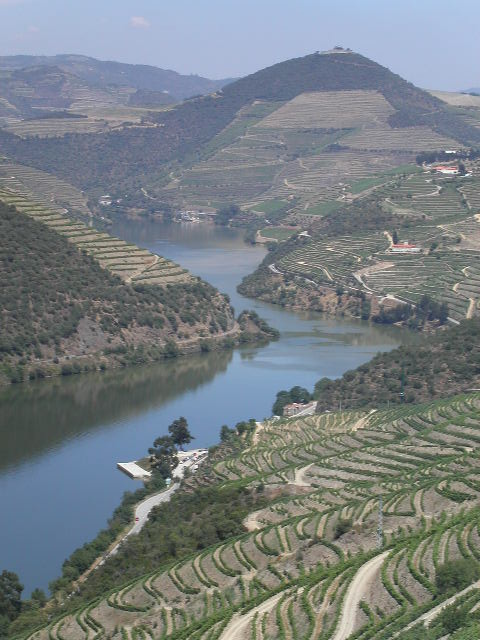
The river near Régua, Portugal

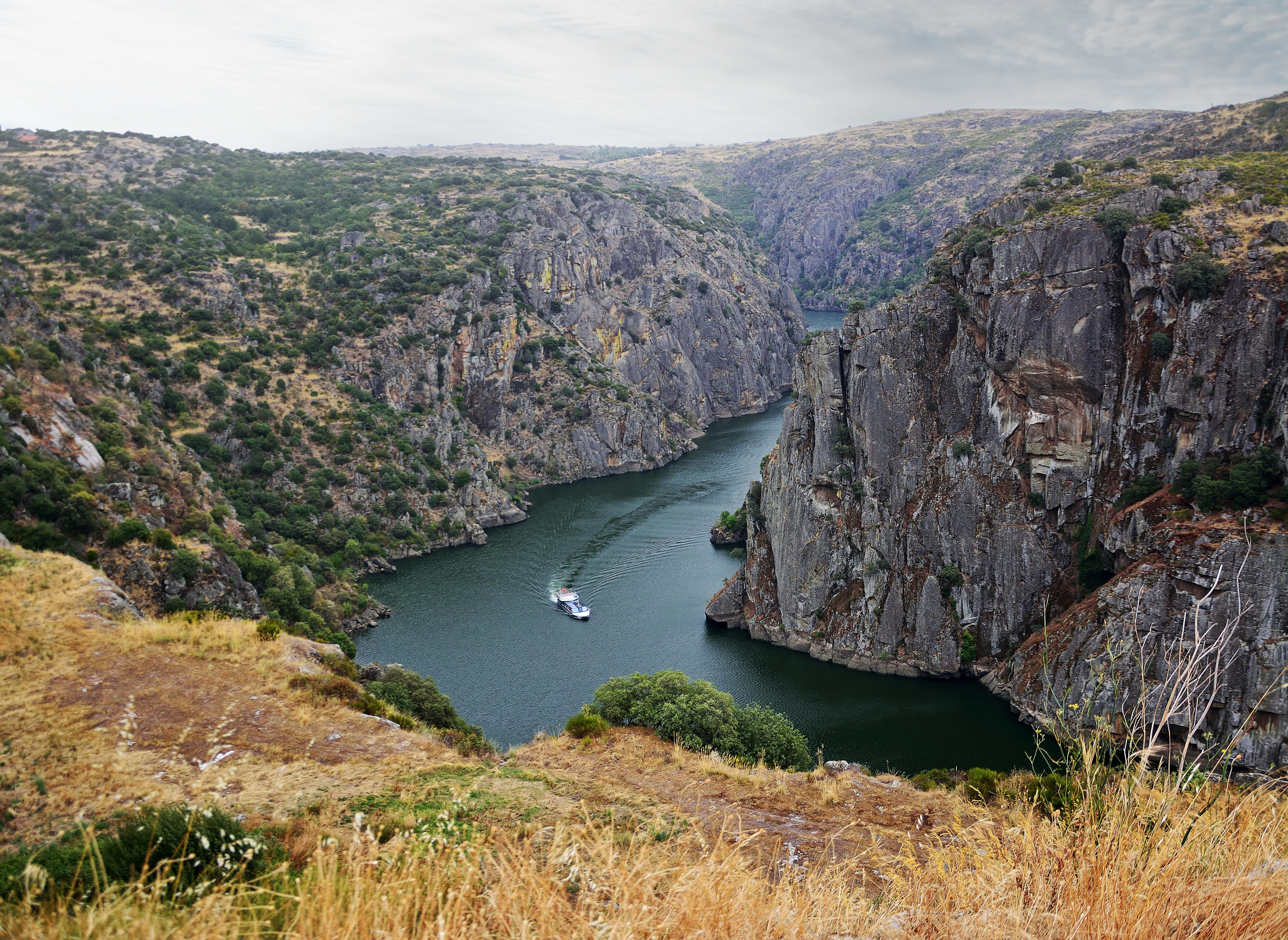
Douro Internacional near Miranda do Douro

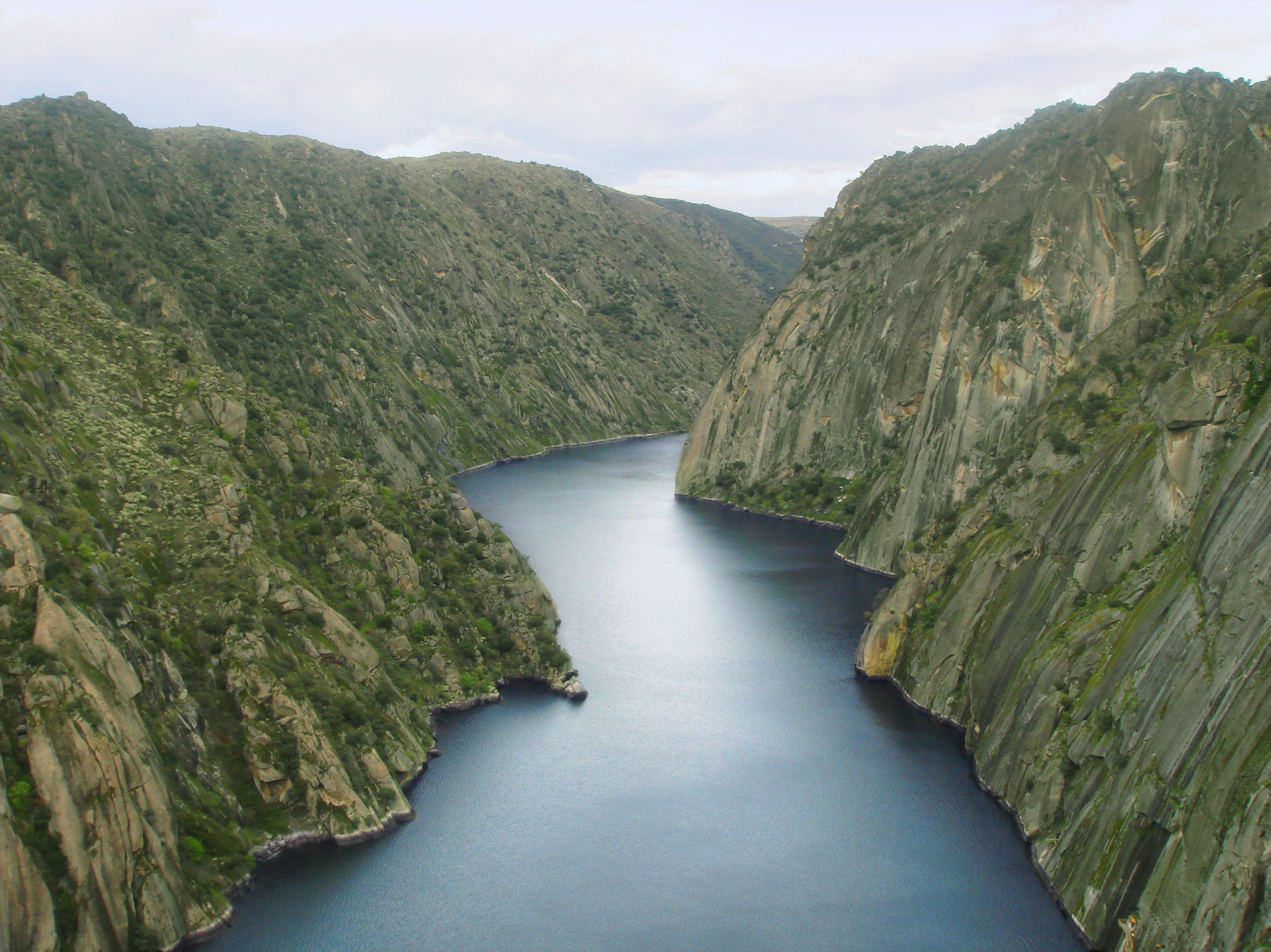
Arribes del Duero near Aldeadávila

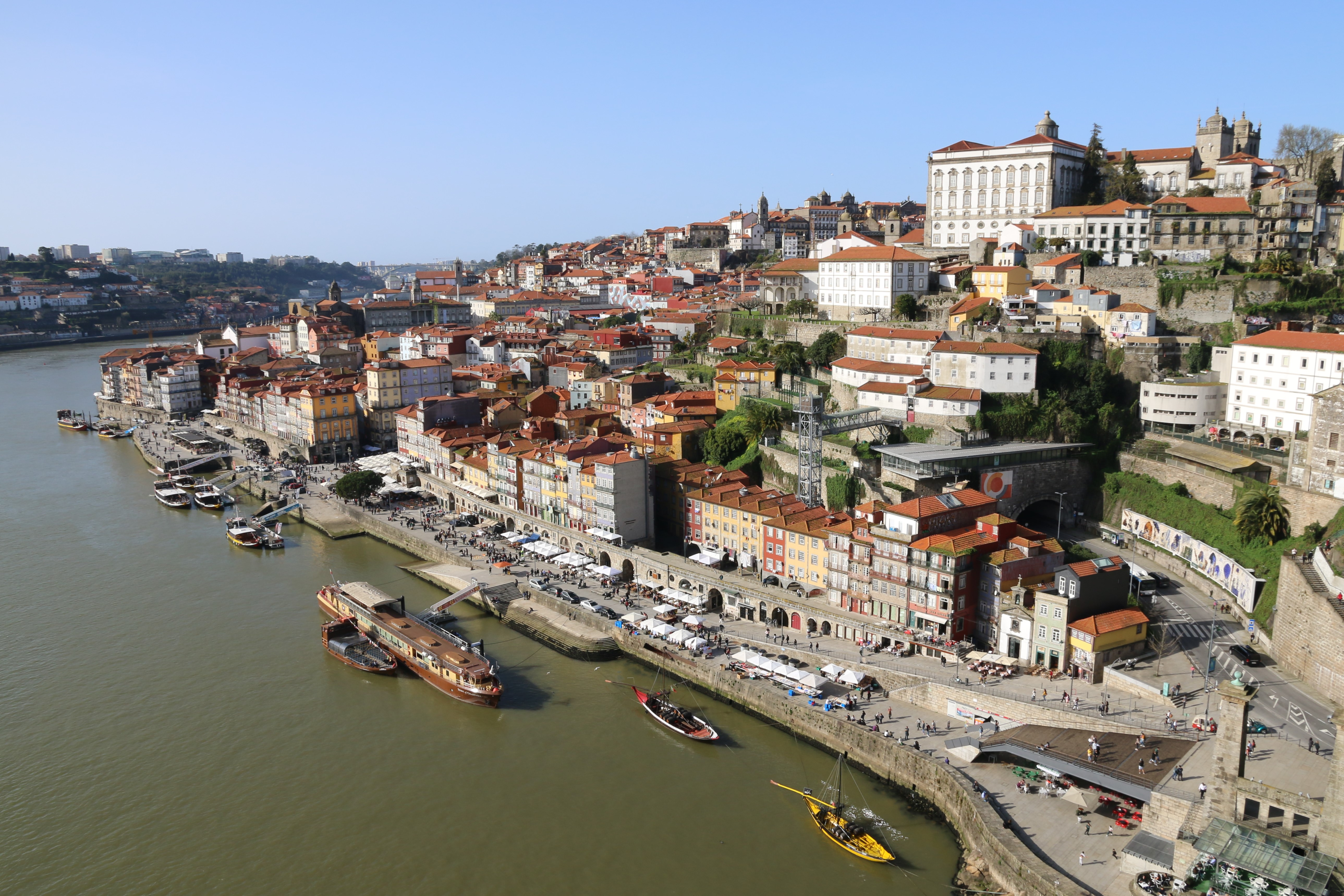
The river mouth in Porto

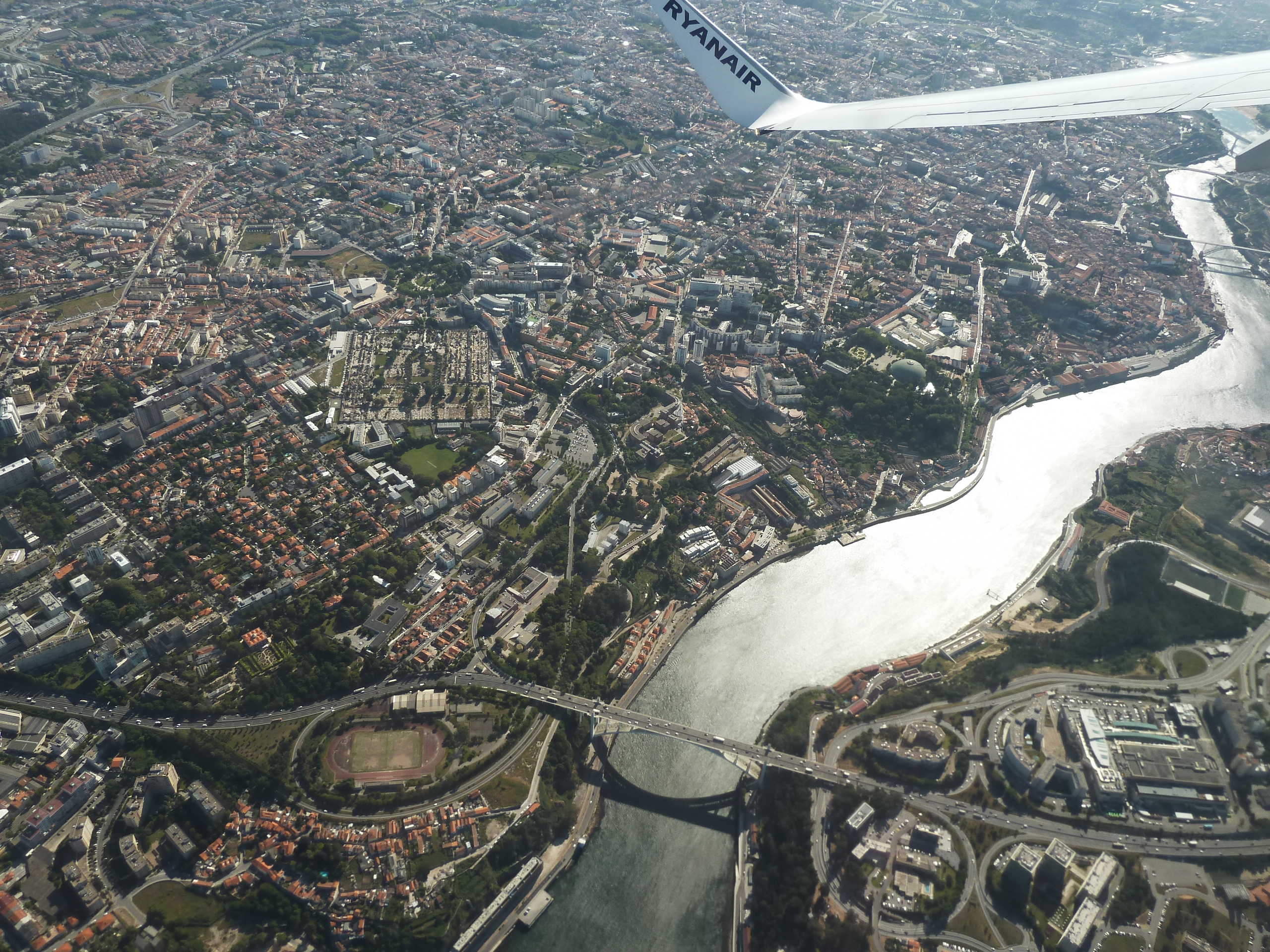
Over Porto

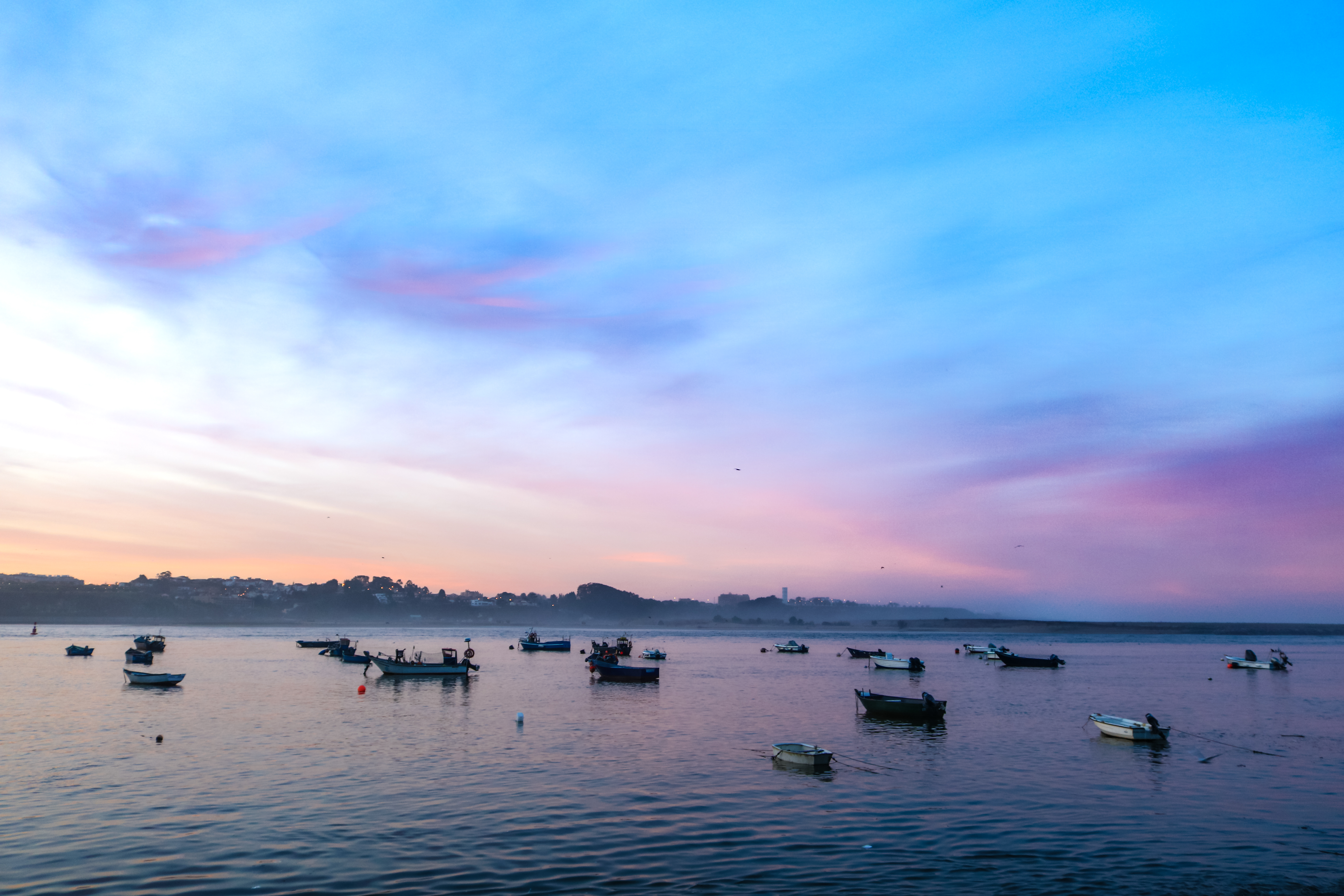
Douro Estuary

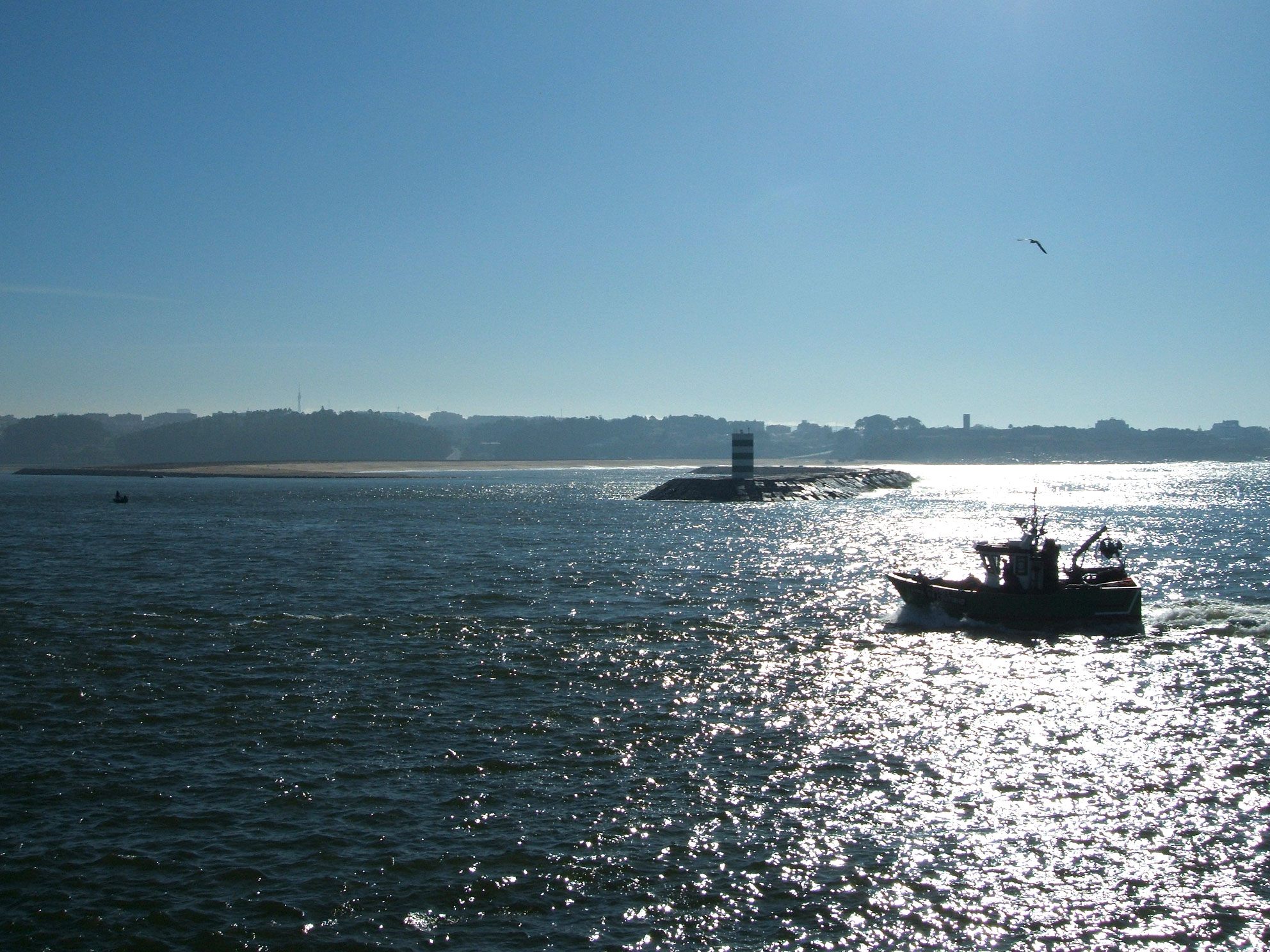
Looking across the river mouth from Foz do Douro to Vila Nova de Gaia (Atlantic Ocean on the right)

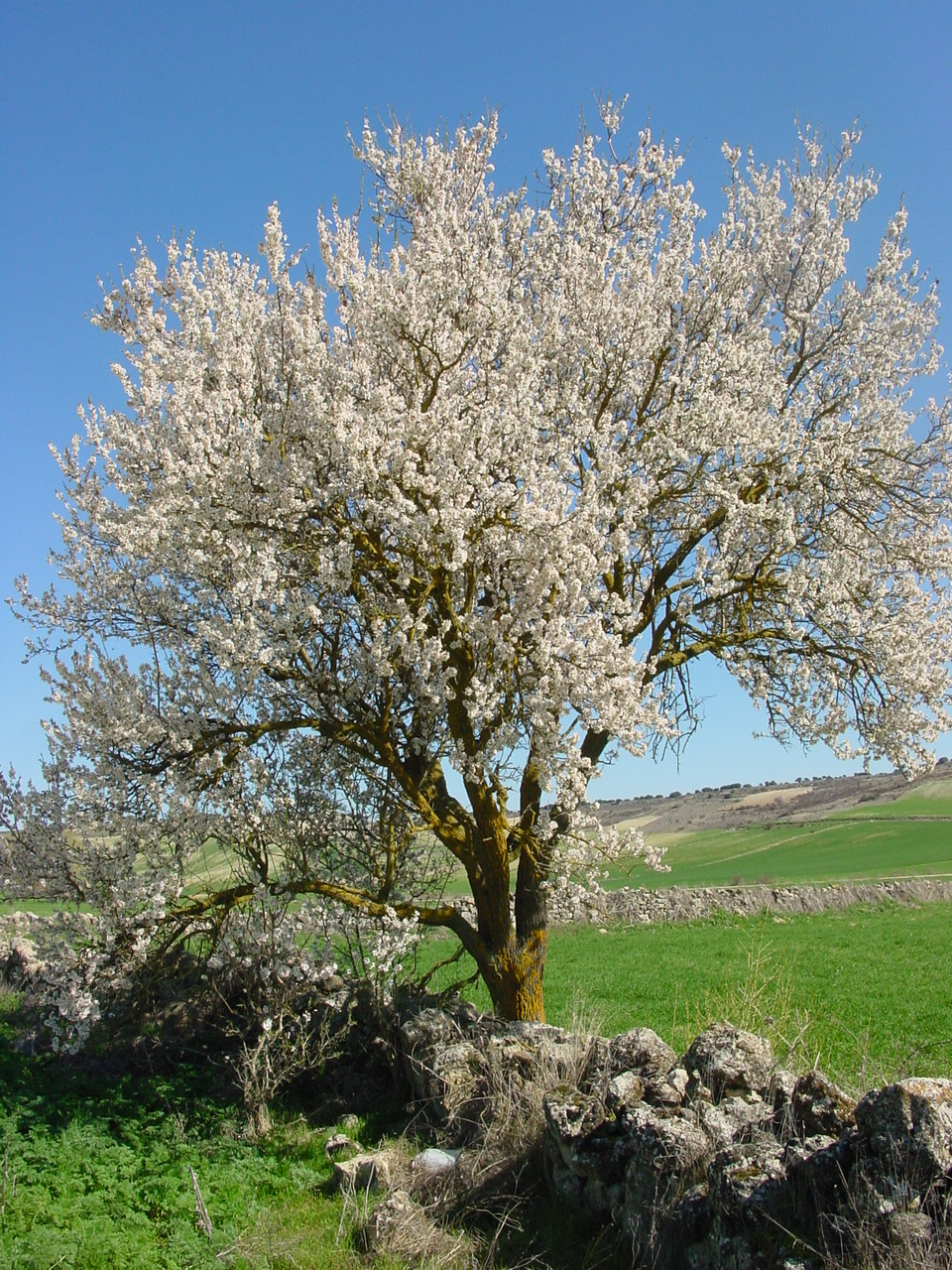
Typical almond tree, mostly seen along the river in Portugal

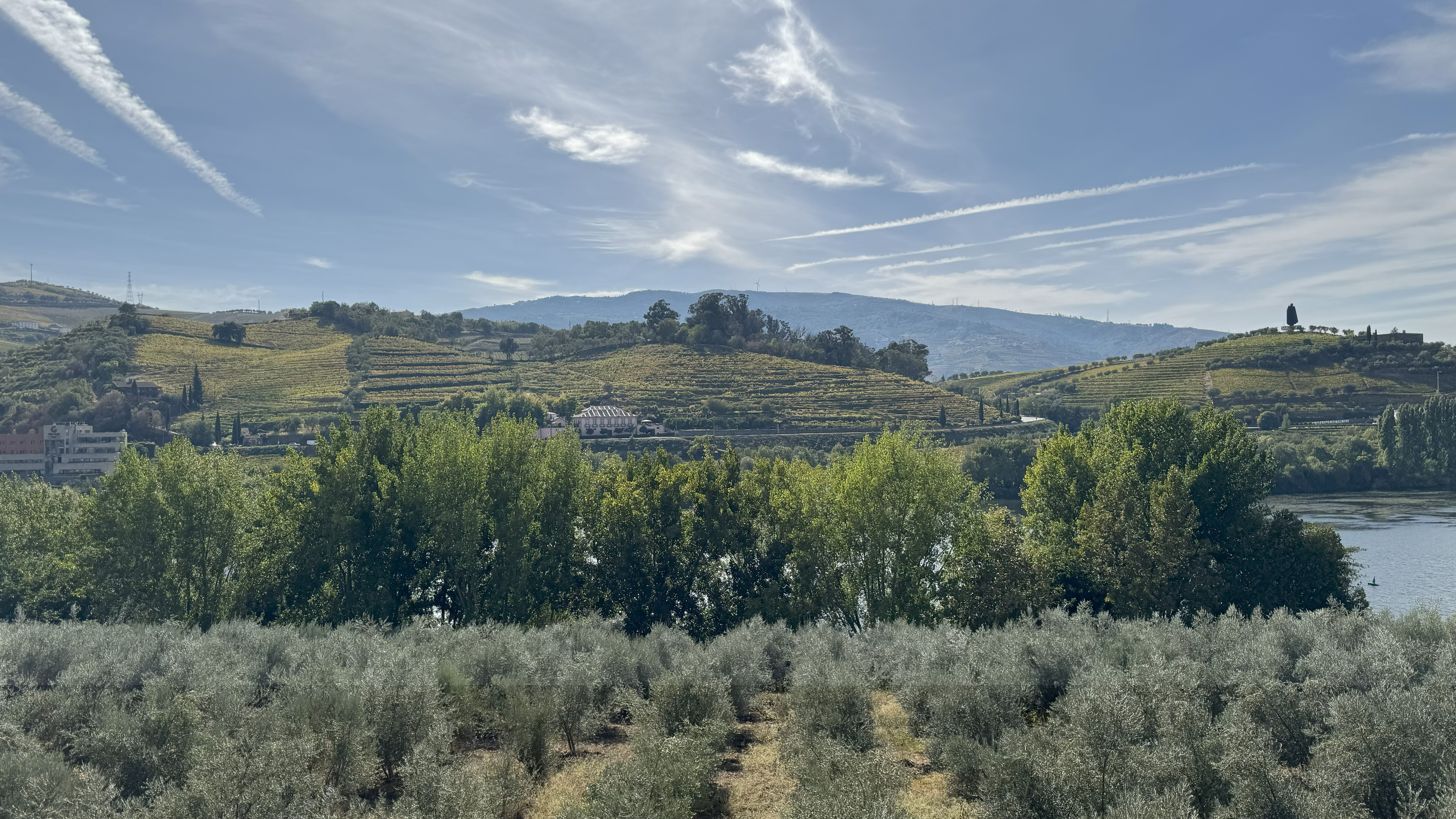
Terraced vineyards near Régua are scattered across the rolling hills, reflecting the river.

== See also ==
- List of rivers of Portugal
- List of rivers of Spain
