= Bustillo de Chaves =

Coordinates: 42°08′N 5°05′W

Bustillo de Chaves, Spain
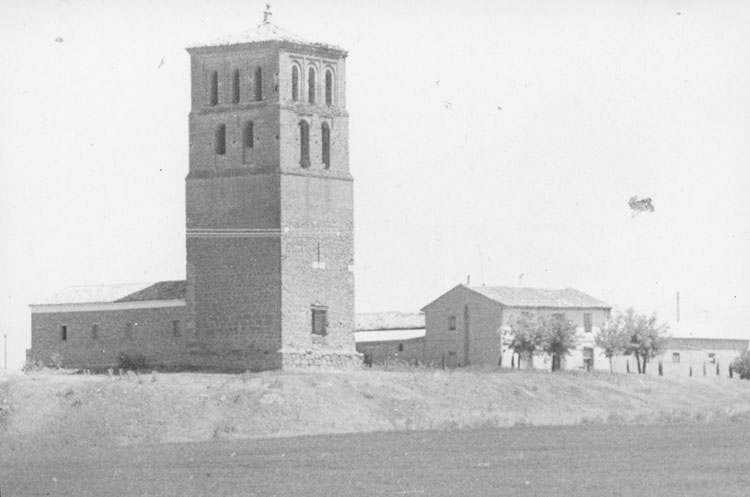
- Antique panoramic view.
- Country: Spain
- Autonomous community: Castile and León
- Province: Valladolid
- Municipality: Bustillo de Chaves

Area
  - Total: 21 km^{2} (8.1 sq mi)

Population (2025-01-01)
  - Total: 66
  - Density: 3.1/km^{2} (8.1/sq mi)
- Time zone: UTC+1 (CET)
  - Summer (DST): UTC+2 (CEST)

Bustillo de Chaves is a municipality located in the province of Valladolid, Castile and León, Spain. According to the 2004 census (INE), the municipality has a population of 102 inhabitants, and in 2012 it had 79 residents.

The village sits along the Navajos river.
