= Dorio =

Dorio may refer to:

== People ==
- Gabriella Dorio (born 1957), Italian athlete and Olympic gold winner
- Julian Dorio (born 1981), American drummer

== Places ==
- Dorio, Lombardy, Italy
- Dorio, Messenia, Greece
- Dorio or Doron, Turkey

== Other ==
- Dori'o language
