= Valderaduey =

River in Spain

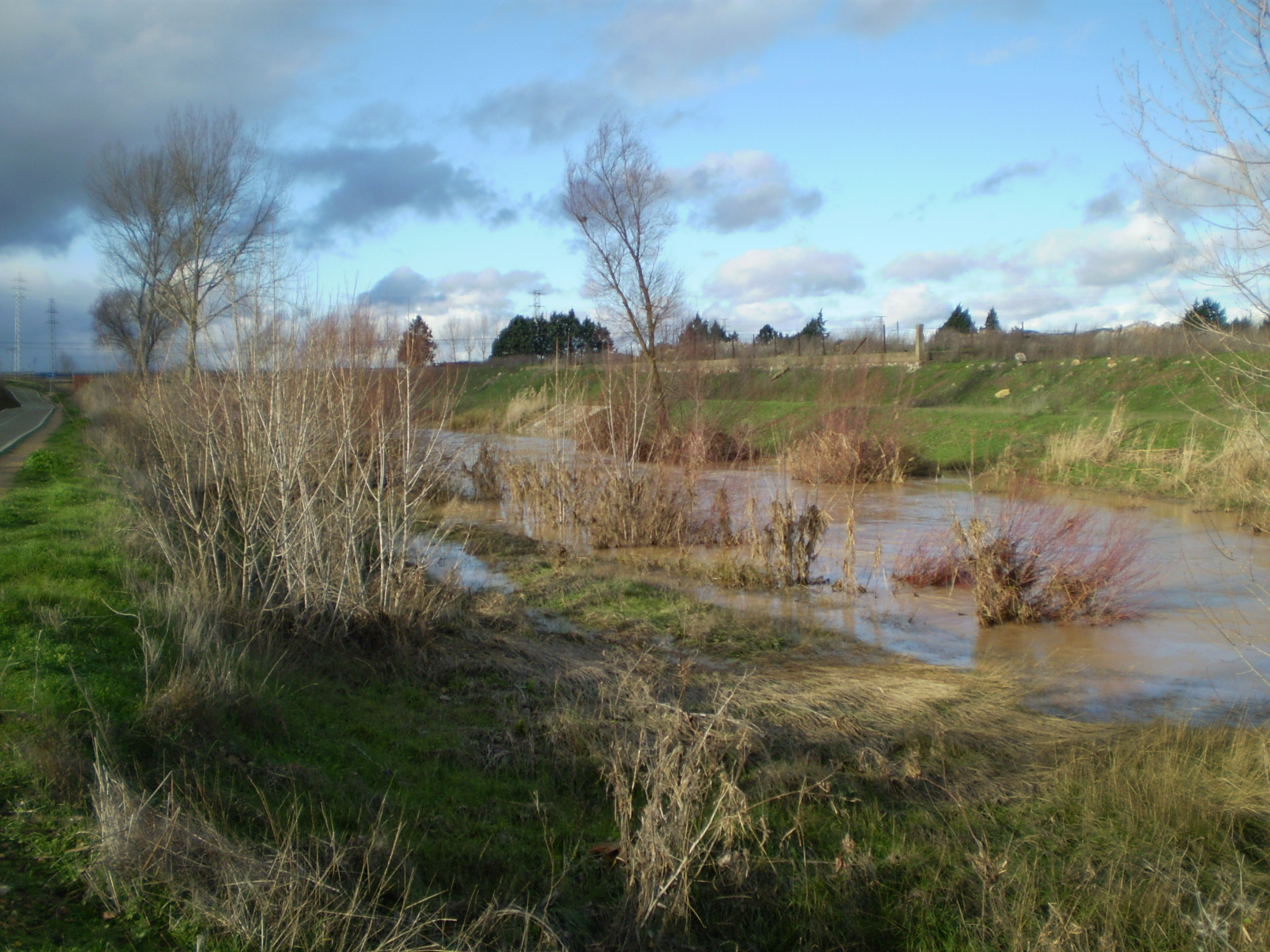
- Valderaduey river near its mouth in the Duero river, during a flooded period

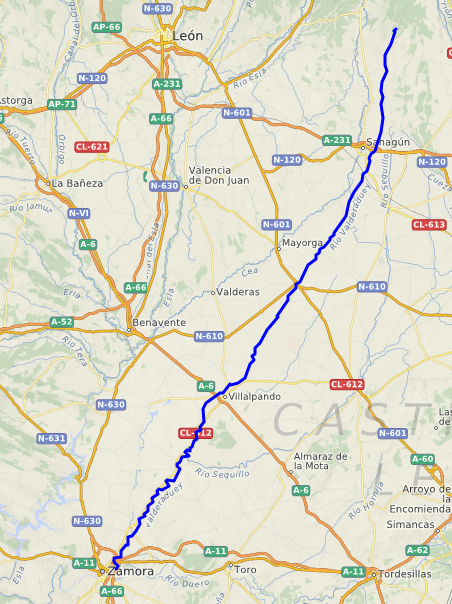
- Location of Valderaduey
- Native name: Río Valderaduey (Spanish)

Location
- Country: Spain
- Autonomous community: Castile and León
- Province: León, Valladolid, Zamora

Physical characteristics
- Mouth: Douro
  - location: Zamora
  - coordinates: 41°30′46″N 5°42′30″W
- Length: 158 km (98 mi)
- Discharge
  - location: Duero river, Zamora municipality

The Valderaduey is a river in central Spain which flows into the Douro on its right bank. In the year 949, an earthquake altered the course of the river.

== Geography ==
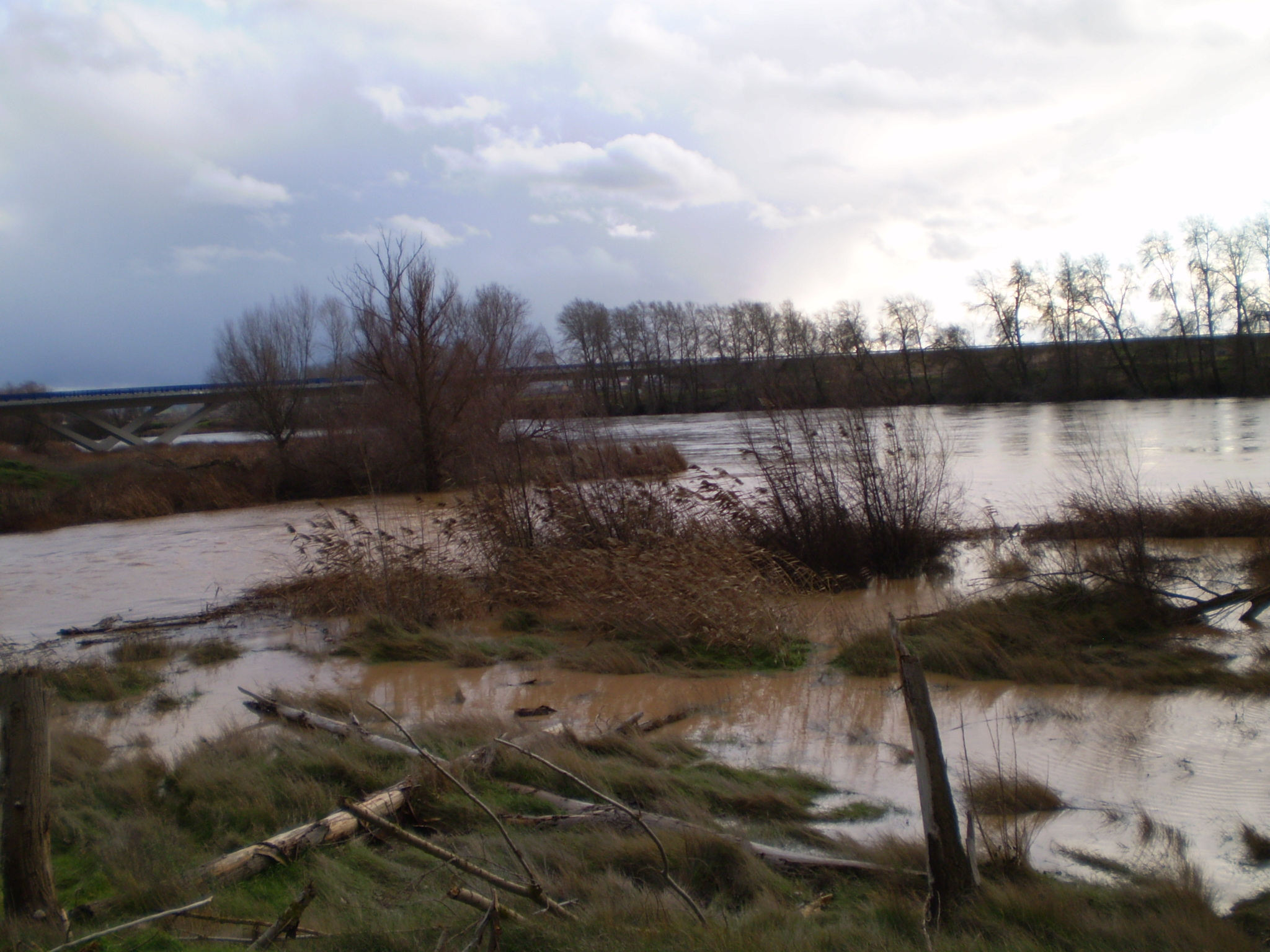
The Valderaduey where it flows into the Duero

The Valderaduey originates on the Riocamba mountain in Renedo de Valderaduey municipality, Province of León From there, the river flows south, passing through the municipalities of Sahagún, Becilla de Valderaduey, Castroponce, San Martín de Valderaduey, Cañizo and Villalpando before flowing into the right bank of the Duero in the municipality of Zamora.

The main tributaries of the Valderaduey are the Río Del Hoyo, Río Pequeno, Río Viejo, Río Bustillo, Río Navajos, Río Sequillo, Río Salado.
