= Sousa River =

River in Portugal

Coordinates: 41°05′16″N 8°31′13″W

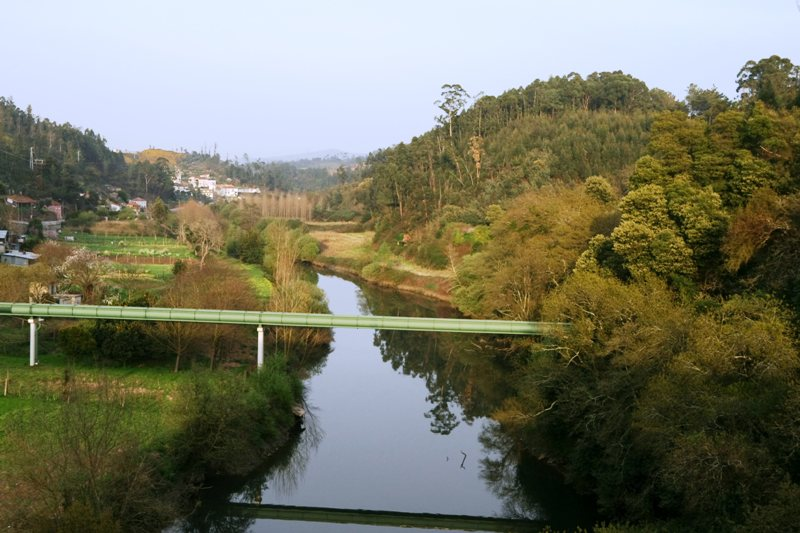
Mouth of the Sousa River.

The Sousa River (Portuguese: rio Sousa, pronounced [ˈso(w)zɐ]) is a river in Portugal, a tributary of the Douro. It rises in the parish of Friande, Felgueiras, in the Porto District of northwest Portugal, and is a right tributary of the Douro, which it meets at the parish of Foz do Sousa, Gondomar, about 16 km from the mouth of the Douro.

== Etymology ==
The name is from Latin Saxa 'rocks', later called Sausa.

== Tributaries ==
- Ferreira River
- Cavalum River
- Messio River
