= Abejar =

- Municipality
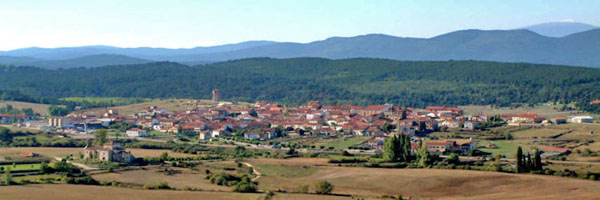

- Coat of arms

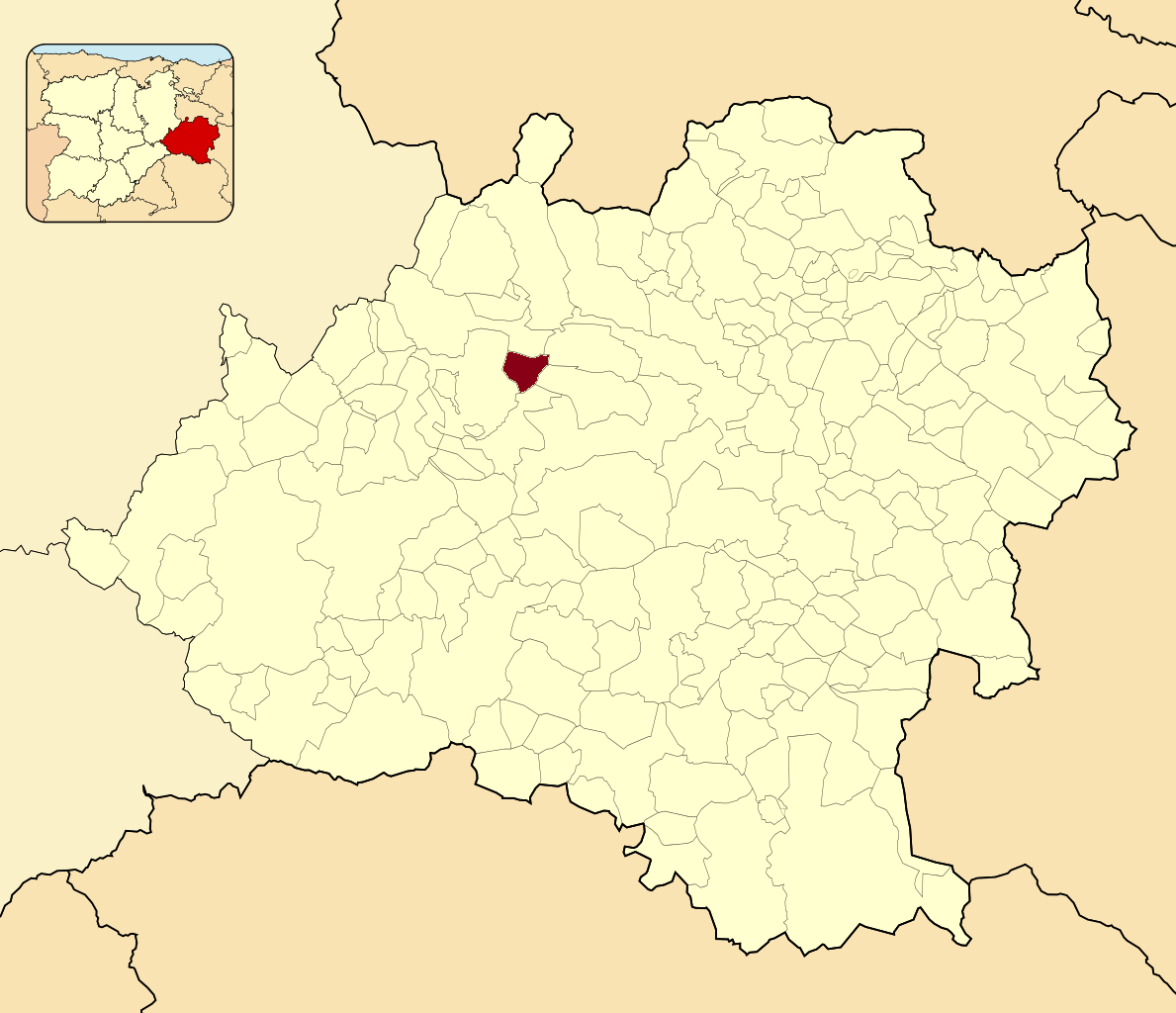
- Municipal location in the Province of Soria.

- Location in Spain. Abejar (Spain)
- Coordinates: 41°47′N 2°46′W
- Country: Spain
- Autonomous community: Castile and León
- Province: Soria
- Comarca: Pinares
- Judicial district: Soria

Government
  - Alcalde: Miguel Angel Navas . (2015) (PSOE)

Area
  - Total: 23.43 km^{2} (9.05 sq mi)
- Elevation: 1,090 m (3,580 ft)

Population (2025-01-01)
  - Total: 287
  - Density: 12.2/km^{2} (31.7/sq mi)
- Demonyms: abejaruco, abejareño, abejarense
- Time zone: UTC+1 (CET)
  - Summer (DST): UTC+2 (CEST)
- Postal code: 42146
- Website: Official website

Abejar is a town and municipality in the Spanish province of Soria, in the autonomous community of Castilla y León. As of 2018, the municipality had a population of 302 people.

== History and customs ==
During the period of the Visigoths, a battle took place in the area in 570 AD, and Abejar was along a Muslim route to the Duero. The ruins of a Moorish tower still remain, attesting to this. The modern settlement was established around the fourteenth and fifteenth centuries when an episcopal manor was established.

As part of the El Martes de Carnaval, Abejar celebrates with the La Barrosa fiesta, an old custom where two young boys dress up. It also hosts a Truffle fair and food show.

== Notable landmarks ==
The Parish Church of San Juan Bautista is a notable example of Sorian gothic architecture. The tower was built in 1627, replacing an earlier one from the 16th century, though the apse and façade are preserved. Nuestra Señora del Camino was built in the 18th century, replacing an earlier church dated to the 15th or 16th century. Saint Teresa of Jesus stayed at the chapel during her passage to Soria in 1581. There are the ruins of a Moorish tower or watchtower, retaining about 3 meters of its original height. The wall is 1 meter thick, and its interior has a diameter of 3.5 meters. A branch of the important 18th century cattle route Cañada Real Soriana Occidental crosses the municipality from North to South.

== See also ==
- Picos de Urbión
