= Darieium =

Darieium (Greek: Δαρίειον) was an ancient city of Asia Minor. Stephanus of Byzantium mentions it as a city of Phrygia. He has also Dorieium, a city of Phrygia, which some suppose may be the same place. Pliny has also a Doron, or Dorio, as it is said to be written in some manuscripts, in Cilicia Tracheia, that may also be the same place.
