= Picos de Urbión =

Mountain range in Spain

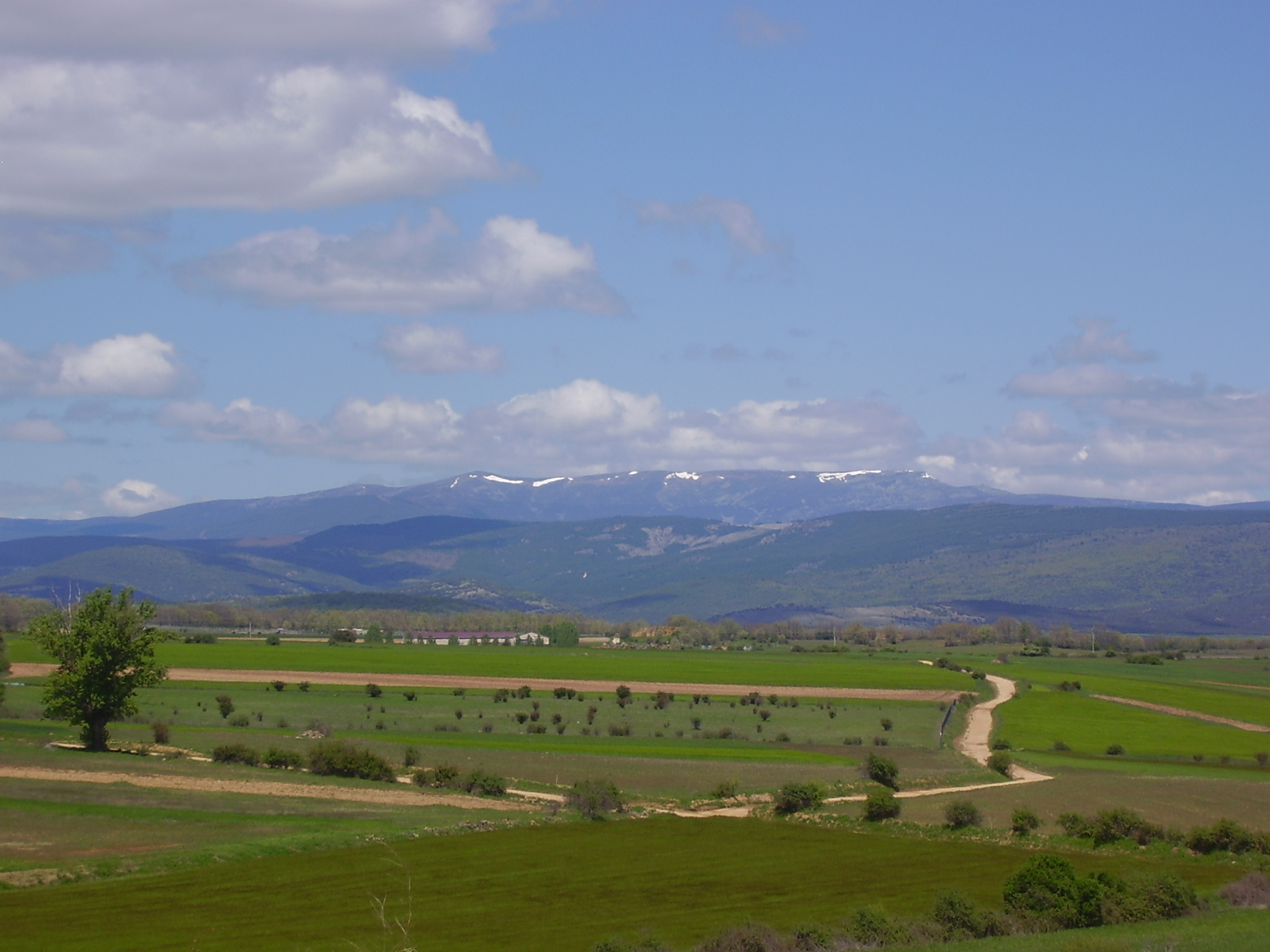
- Los Tajones in the Picos de Urbión

Highest point
- Elevation: 2,228 m (7,310 ft)
- Coordinates: 42°00′30″N 2°51′52″W

Geography
- Location within Spain
- Location: Province of Soria & Province of Burgos (Castile and León & La Rioja)
- Parent range: Sistema Ibérico

Geology
- Mountain type: Slate

Climbing
- Easiest route: From Duruelo de la Sierra or Abejar

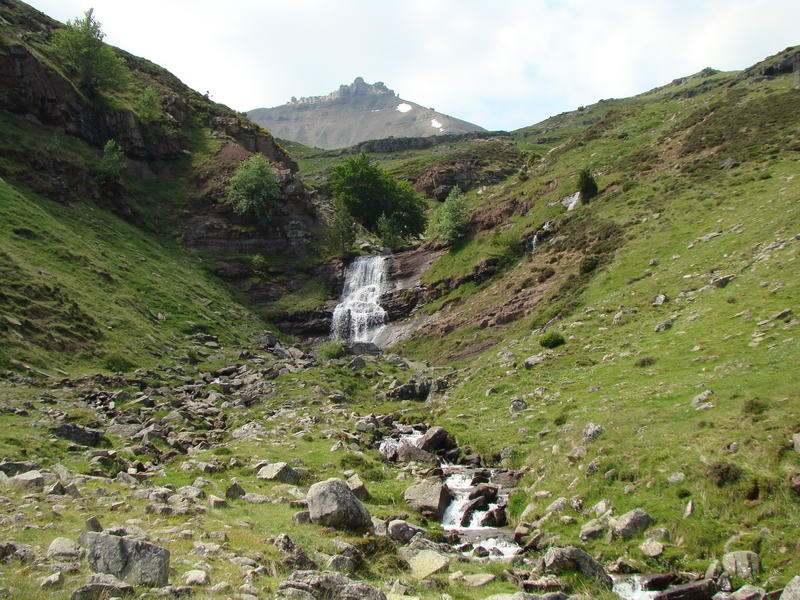
Urbión River with the Pico Urbión (2.228 m) in the background.

Picos de Urbión, or "Urbion Peaks" is a mountain range in the Sistema Ibérico, Spain, limited by the Sierra de Neila and Sierra Cebollera of the same range. The ridge's highest summit, Pico Urbión, is 2,228 m) is one of the highest points in the 500 km long Sistema Ibérico.

== Geography ==
The Picos de Urbión are located in the municipal terms of Duruelo de la Sierra and Viniegra de Abajo, between the provinces of Soria and Burgos in Castile and León and La Rioja (Spain). The Duero River and the Najerilla have their source in these mountains. These mountain ranges divide the Ebro and Duero basins.

Its relief was modelled by glaciers, giving origin to lakes like the Laguna de Urbión or the Laguna Negra, both good places for hiking.

The highest peaks of the range are usually covered in snow between October and May every year. The Sierra de la Demanda is located north of these mountains.

== See also ==
- Sistema Ibérico
