= Doron Gepner =

Israeli theoretical physicist

- דורון גפנר
- Born: March 31, 1956; Philadelphia, United States
- Education: Technion (B.S.), Weizmann Institute of Science (Ph.D.)
- Known for: Gepner models
- Scientific career
- Fields: Theoretical physics
- Workplaces: Technion; Weizmann Institute of Science; Princeton University; California Institute of Technology
- Thesis: Nonperturbative phenomena in field theory (1985)
- Doctoral advisor: Yitzhak Frishman

Doron Gepner (Hebrew: דורון גפנר; born March 31, 1956) is an Israeli theoretical physicist. He made important contributions to the study of string theory, two-dimensional conformal field theory, and integrable models.

== Birth and education ==
Gepner was born in Philadelphia to Israeli parents. He studied mathematics at Technion, Haifa (B. Sc., 1976) and theoretical physics at the Weizmann Institute, Rehovot (Ph.D., 1985), where his graduate advisor was Yitzhak Frishman. His early work focused on non-perturbative quantum field theory in two space-time dimensions.

== Research ==
In 1985–1987 Gepner was a postdoctoral researcher at Princeton University. He made important contributions to the study of Rational Conformal Field Theory with extended chiral algebras. He also pioneered the use of methods of conformal field theory to study compactifications of superstring and heterotic string on Calabi–Yau manifolds. He introduced exactly solvable examples of such compactifications now known as Gepner models. This was an important step in establishing that superstrings and heterotic strings have a landscape of consistent vacua. Later he held research and teaching positions at Princeton University (1987-1989), Weizmann Institute (1989-1993) and California Institute of Technology (1992-1994). Since 1993 he has been an associate professor at the Weizmann Institute. Gepner's later work centered on Rational Conformal Field Theory and its relation with 2D integrable models. Gepner also made notable contributions to the theory of partitions in number theory, finding deep generalizations and analogs of the Rogers–Ramanujan identities.

== Students ==
- Ron Cohen
- Anton Kapustin
- Ernest Baver
- Boris Gotkin
- Umut Gursoy
- Boris Noyvert
- Joseph Conlon
- Sheshansu Pal
- Barak Haim
- Genish Arel
