= Doron Kliger =

Doron Kliger (Hebrew: דורון קליגר) is a Professor of Behavioral Economics and Finance as well as head of the Department of Economics at the University of Haifa.

Kliger holds a PhD Tel-Aviv University (1998) and is associate editor of the Journal of Behavioral and Experimental Economics.
