= San Martín de Valderaduey =

Coordinates: 41°49′N 5°28′W

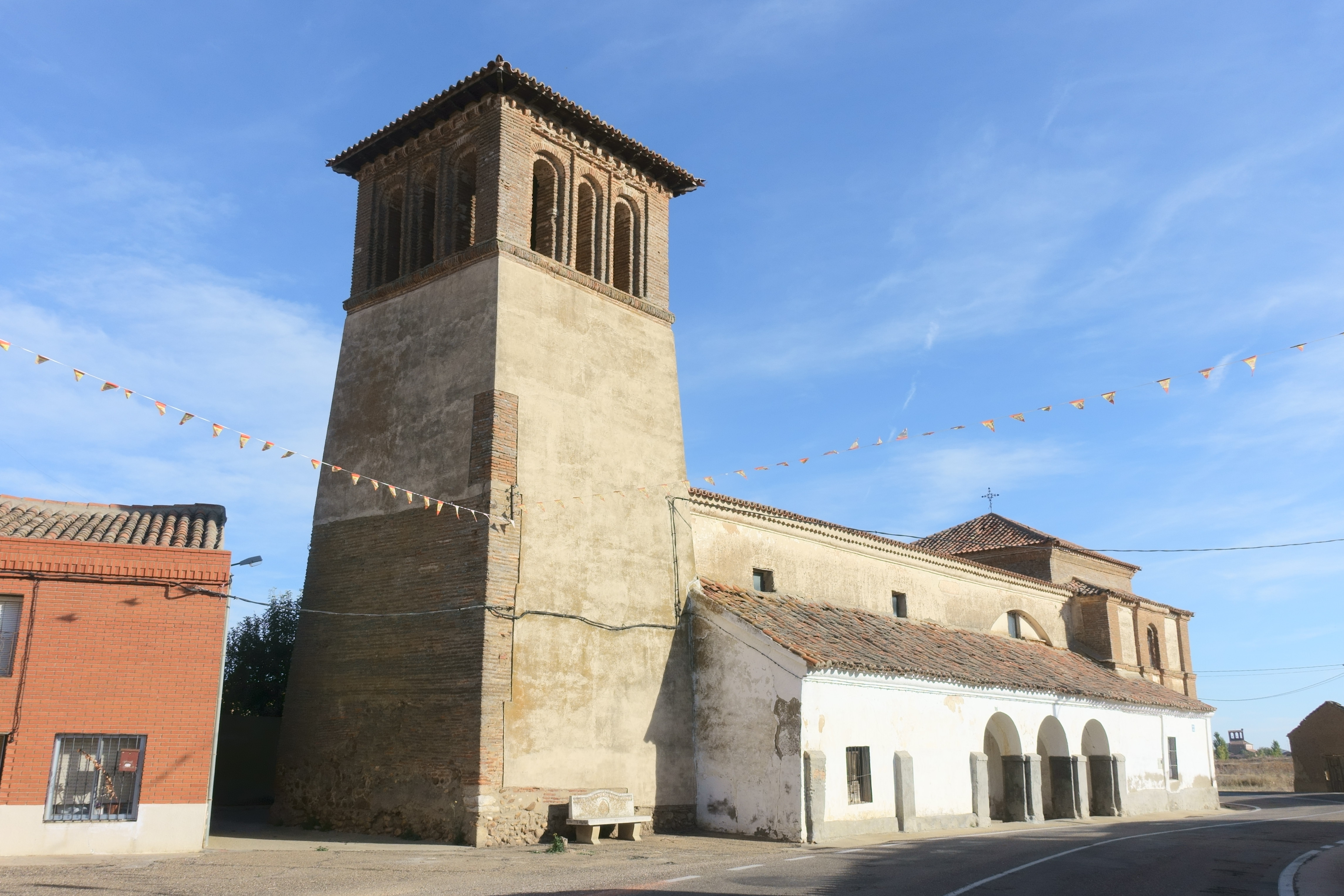
- Interactive map of San Martín de Valderaduey
- Country: Spain
- Autonomous community: Castile and León
- Province: Zamora
- Municipality: San Martín de Valderaduey

Area
  - Total: 23 km^{2} (8.9 sq mi)

Population (2025-01-01)
  - Total: 47
  - Density: 2.0/km^{2} (5.3/sq mi)
- Time zone: UTC+1 (CET)
  - Summer (DST): UTC+2 (CEST)

San Martín de Valderaduey is a municipality located in the Sanabria comarca, province of Zamora, Castile and León, Spain. According to the 2004 census (INE), the municipality has a population of 86 inhabitants. The town's main church is from the 10th century.
