= Duruelo de la Sierra =

- Municipality
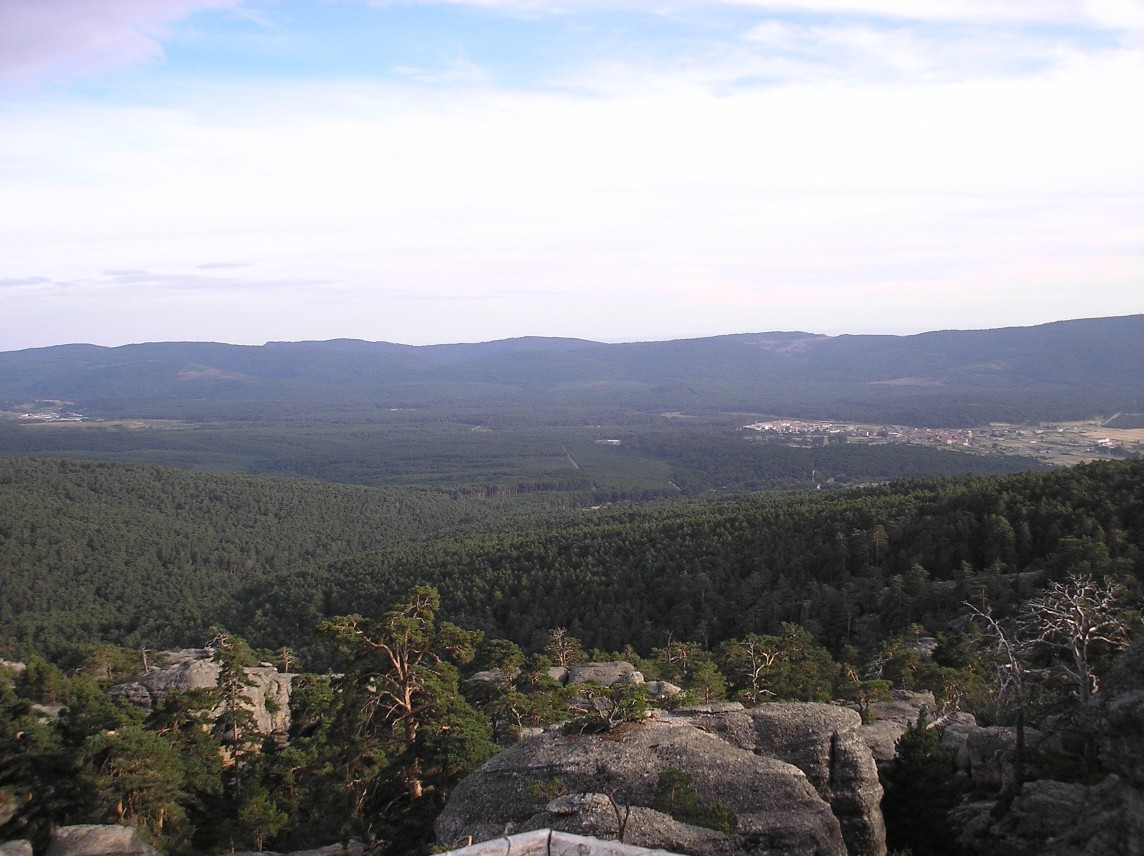

- Flag Coat of arms

- Location in Spain Duruelo de la Sierra (Spain)
- Coordinates: 41°57′15″N 2°55′54″W
- Country: Spain
- Autonomous community: Castile and León
- Province: Soria
- Comarca: Pinares
- Judicial district: Soria

Government
  - Alcalde: Román Martín Simón. (2007) (PP)

Area
  - Total: 44.84 km^{2} (17.31 sq mi)
- Elevation: 1,205 m (3,953 ft)
- Highest elevation: 2,228.76 m (7,312.2 ft)

Population (2025-01-01)
  - Total: 1,035
  - Density: 23.08/km^{2} (59.78/sq mi)
- Demonym: Durolenses
- Time zone: UTC+1 (CET)
  - Summer (DST): UTC+2 (CEST)
- Postal code: 42158
- Official language(s): Spanish
- Website: Official website

Duruelo de la Sierra is a municipality of Spain, in the province of Soria, Autonomous Community of Castile and León (Spanish Comunidad Autónoma de Castilla y León).

== Population ==
Duruelo de la Sierra has an area of 44.55 km^{2}, with a population of 1,473 inhabitants and a density of 31.56/km^{2}.

== Geography ==
- Altitude: 1205 metres
- Distance to Soria: 55 kilometres

== Monuments and Statues ==
- Santa Marina Hermitage.
- San Miguel Arcángel Church (12th Century), extended 16th Century.
- Medieval Graveyard, behind San Miguel's Church. Much touristic interest, dating from the 9th to the 10th Century. (Spanish Necròpolis Medieval)

== Flora and fauna ==
The flora of this particular region is emphasized by Scots Pine (Spanish: pino albar), accompanied by Erica vagans (Spanish: brezo), and Oak Tree (Spanish: roble).

The fauna for this particular region is emphasized by Red Deer (Spanish: ciervo), European Roe Deer (Spanish: corzo), Wild Boar (Spanish: jabalí) and Eagle (Spanish: águila).

== Economy ==
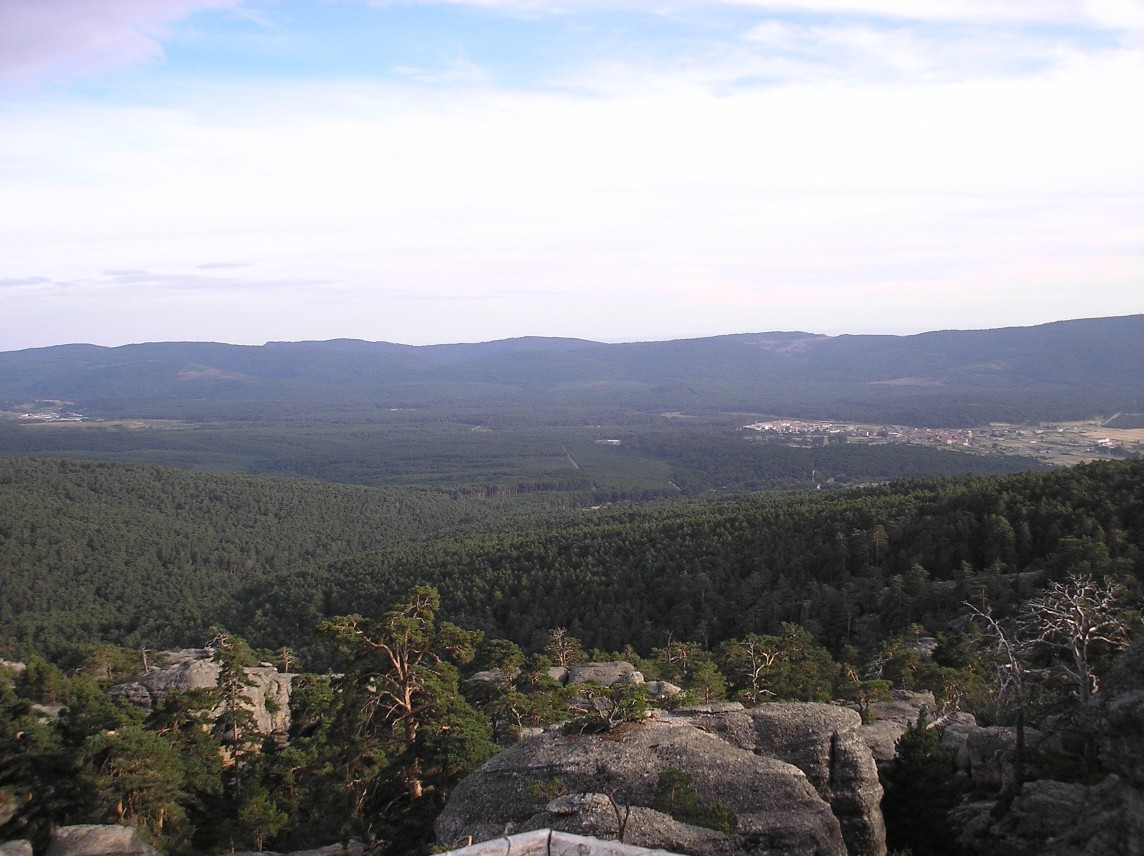
Duruelo de la Sierra and Covaleda between the pine forest, as seen from the Mirador de Castroviejo.

- Forest advantages, distribution between neighbours results in a gain of sales of the pines.
- Furniture and Wood Industry, the great industrial estate is currently expanding.
- There exists several sawmills where the pines become planks, and are sold to Spain and other countries.

== Locations ==
- Pico de Urbión (lit. Tip of Urbión): observed from the valley, much touristic interest.
- Castroviejo: location contains unusual rock formations.
- Cueva Serena (lit. Calm Cave)
- La Chorla
- Ambas Cuerdas (lit. Both Cords)
- Fuente del berro (lit. Source of the Watercress)
- Peñas blancas (lit. White Rocks)
- Laguna de Urbión (lit. Lagoon of Urbión)
- Nacimiento del Duero (lit. Birth of Duero)

== International relations ==
=== Twin towns – Sister cities ===
Duruelo de la Sierra is twinned with:

- Porto, Portugal, since 1989

== Festivals and traditions ==
=== Festivals ===
- Martes de Carnaval: A Tuesday of February or March.
- Santa Marina: 17 and 18 July.
- El Cristo: 13 to 17 September.

=== Traditions ===
- La Ronda: the celebration of Martes de Carnaval and Santa Marina.
- Vaca Flaca: the celebration of Martes de Carnaval.
- La Rueda (lit. The Wheel)
- Colgar al Judas (lit. Hanging of Judas)

== See also ==
- Picos de Urbión
