= Helen Doron =

British linguist and educator (b. 1955)

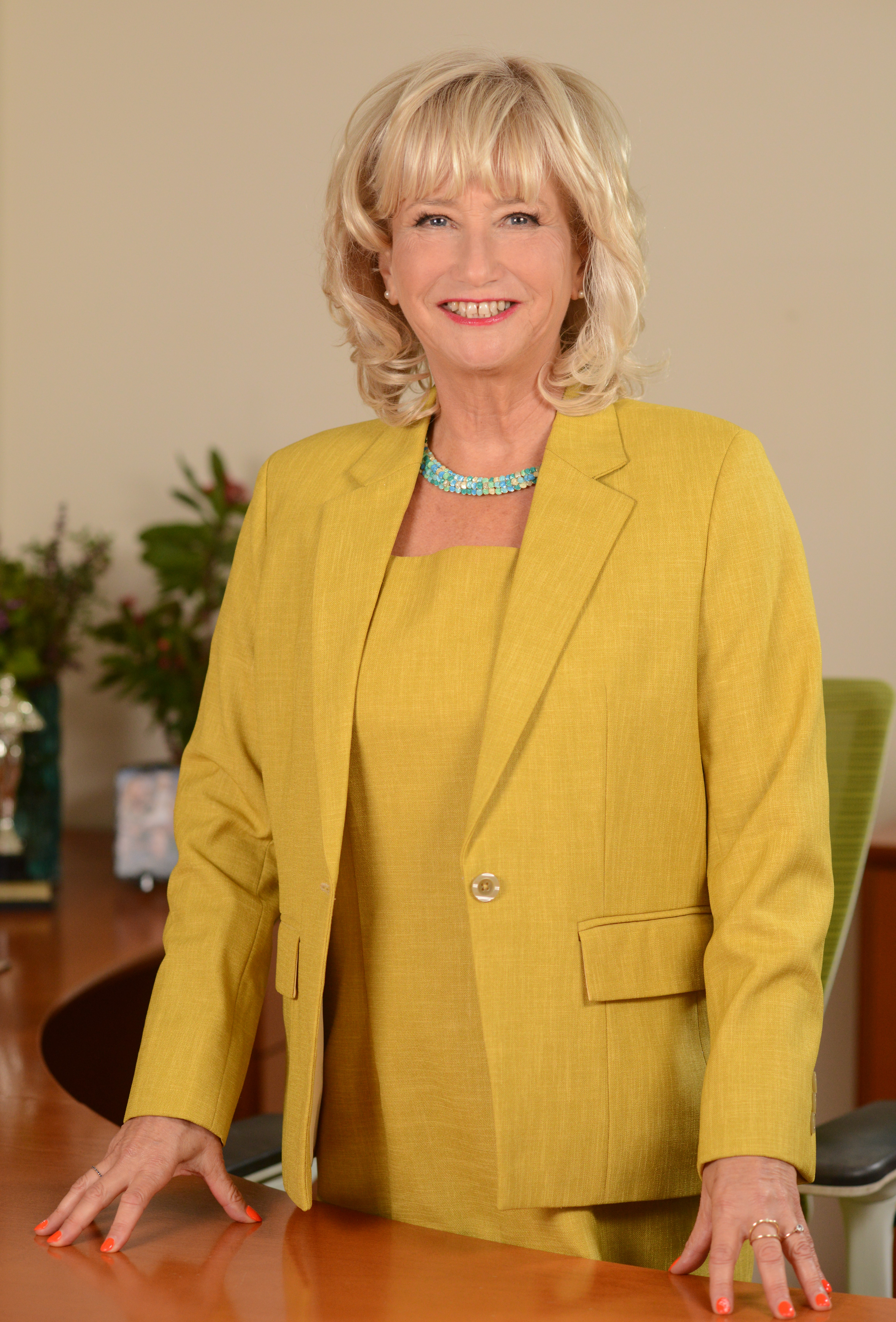
- Born: Helen Rachel Lowenthal; 5 November 1955 (age 70); London, UK
- Education: B.A in Linguistic Science and French; M.A. in Linguistics
- Occupations: Linguist and educator
- Known for: Founder of the Helen Doron method of education and Helen Doron Educational Group
- Children: 3

Helen Rachel Doron, née Lowenthal (born 5 November 1955), is an English linguist, educator, and entrepreneur. She is known for developing an early foreign-language teaching approach based on principles of mother-tongue language acquisition and for founding the Helen Doron Educational Group, an international educational franchise network operating in approximately 40 countries, including across Europe, South Korea, and Turkey. The company is registered in the United Kingdom. The group offers language and enrichment programs under several educational brands, including Helen Doron Academy, Helen Doron International, MathRiders, and Helen Doron Spanish. Doron also is a board member of Curiosity Robotics, a company developing an AI-based talking robot trained on the Helen Doron English method.

== Biography ==
Helen Doron was born in the United Kingdom and educated in England, where she pursued studies in linguistics and French at the University of Reading, earning a B.A. with dual honors in Linguistic Science and French, before teaching at the University of Poitiers in France. Following her early academic and teaching experience, Doron began developing her approach to early foreign-language education. She established her franchise in the early 1990s and completed a master's degree in educational linguistics. The early development of Helen's educational work began with self-produced audio materials, including cassette recordings used in small-scale teaching settings, before expanding into a formal educational network.[43] She has also noted that her husband provided practical and personal support during the early stages of the business as it developed into an international organization.

Helen has expressed long-standing support for a plant-based diet, including through the publication of a vegan recipe book that has been released internationally, including in a Korean-language edition. She has also stated that these values inform aspects of her educational philosophy and organizational culture within the Helen Doron Educational Group.

Doron has three children. Her son, Benaya, holds a joint degree in Physics and Neuroscience and is the CEO of Helen Doron International in South Korea. He is also a singer songwriter, who released his first album in 2013. Her daughter, Ella, is a singer-songwriter. She released her first album, Ella vs Mountain, in 2012. Helen's youngest son, Adam, holds a PhD in physics whose research focused on quantum mechanics.

== Methodology ==
The Helen Doron Method is an approach to early foreign-language education designed to replicate key conditions of first-language acquisition. It is based on the premise that young children can acquire additional languages naturally when exposed to them early, frequently, and in a positive emotional environment, without pressure to consciously analyze linguistic rules. Doron describes the method as emphasizing how children learn rather than what they are taught, prioritizing intuitive absorption over formal instruction in the early stages.

A central component of the methodology is repeated background hearing, in which children are regularly exposed to recorded language through songs, stories, and dialogues outside the classroom. This repeated home listening is intended to familiarize learners with sound patterns, rhythm, and intonation before they are expected to actively produce language, mirroring the way infants absorb their first language through constant auditory input. Doron calls this 'the mother tongue method of learning language'.

Instruction within the classroom emphasizes listening and speaking as foundational skills. Reading and writing are introduced gradually and in age-appropriate ways as children mature cognitively and emotionally. Lessons incorporate music, movement, games, and role-play to support engagement and reinforce language patterns through multisensory learning.

The method places strong emphasis on positive reinforcement and emotional security. Teachers are trained to create a supportive, non-judgmental atmosphere in which mistakes are treated as a natural part of learning. Motivation, encouragement, and consistent praise are used to build confidence and sustain long-term engagement. This learner-centered and humanistic orientation is frequently highlighted in institutional and academic descriptions of the approach.

Content and teaching strategies are tailored to developmental stages, with distinct programs designed for infants, toddlers, children, and adolescents. For very young learners, activities focus on sensory stimulation, repetition, and parental involvement, while older learners engage in more structured communicative tasks, storytelling, and guided interaction. Across age groups, the curriculum relies on a large body of original songs, streaming content, and educational materials developed specifically for each level.

Doron has acknowledged the influence of immersion-based learning philosophies, particularly those associated with Shinichi Suzuki's approach to music education, known as the Suzuki method, which emphasizes early exposure, repeated background home hearing, parental support, and learning in a nurturing environment. The Helen Doron Method adapts these principles to language education, applying them to spoken language rather than musical performance.

Doron has also cited the influence of Glenn Doman's early learning approach, particularly its emphasis on early stimulation, repetition, and the belief that young children benefit from rich sensory input during critical developmental periods. Doman maintains that the critical time window for brain and language development is up to the age of 7. Elements associated with the Doman method are reflected in the Helen Doron Method's focus on frequent exposure, structured repetition, and parental involvement in early learning.

The methodology is commonly described as drawing on insights from developmental psychology and early learning research, particularly regarding sensitive periods for language acquisition, affective factors in learning, and the role of meaningful input in cognitive development. Rather than presenting a standalone theoretical framework, the method integrates these concepts into a structured, practice-oriented teaching system.

Academic studies and evaluations have examined the Helen Doron Method across multiple institutional and national contexts, consistently reporting high levels of learner engagement, positive classroom dynamics, and alignment with established principles of early foreign-language acquisition and immersion-based instruction.

== The Helen Doron Educational Group ==
The Helen Doron Educational Group (HDEG) is an international franchise network focused on early childhood, mathematics, and language education. The group has been active since 1985 and operates in approximately 40 countries through more than 1,200 learning centers and academies worldwide. This includes English-only speaking kindergartens and preschools that use our methodology and learning materials and as well bilingual kindergartens and preschools.

The HDEG delivers its educational programs through multiple branded offerings, including Helen Doron Academy, Helen Doron International, MathRiders, the "Ready, Steady, Move!" program, which combines various movement disciplines and second language acquisition to create a stimulating and fun learning environment for young children, and language programs in additional languages such as Spanish. The group's international activities span multiple regions, with established operations across Europe, Latin America, East and Central Asia, and Türkiye.

Women represent a substantial proportion of the group's leadership, master franchisees, and learning-center owners.

A significant proportion of Helen Doron English franchise owners are former teachers or parents who transition into business ownership after working within the educational system, often expanding from single centers to multi-unit operations.

Industry organizations have recognized the group's franchise model and leadership. In 2019, the Helen Doron Educational Group received the Global Franchise Award for Best Children's & Educational Franchise, and in 2020 and 2021, it received the Global Mentorship Award.

Doron herself has also received industry recognition related to mentorship and leadership in franchising. In 2020, she was named among the 100 Most Influential Women in Franchising by franchise consulting and industry organizations. In 2023, Doron was also included in The Powerlist: 50 Era-Defining Women to Watch, published by Global Franchise. She has additionally been recognized through business and education awards, highlighting leadership, mentoring, and organizational impact.

Media profiles and franchise case studies have described the group's structure as providing opportunities for women to operate and manage educational businesses within an international franchise framework.

In 2025, the Helen Doron Educational Group received accreditation from the Middle States Association (MSA-CESS), an international accrediting organization for schools and educational institutions.[32][33][34] The accreditation applies to the group's educational system and organizational framework, recognizing standards related to governance, curriculum, instructional quality, and continuous improvement across affiliated programs.

The Helen Doron Educational Group has announced initiatives to enter the United States market by establishing bilingual kindergarten programs. The group has described its U.S. expansion strategy as involving collaboration with local partners to support the introduction of its educational framework.

=== Educational Programs & Tools ===
The group operates several branded educational programs within its franchise network. These include Helen Doron Academy, an all-day bilingual preschool program; Helen Doron International, a full-day English-language kindergarten program; MathRiders, an after-school mathematics enrichment program; and Helen Doron Spanish.

In addition to its in-person educational programs, the Helen Doron Educational Group offers digital learning resources and online platforms supporting language education. These include mobile applications distributed through platforms such as Google Play and the Apple App Store, as well as TeenBuzz, an interactive online radio platform developed for teen and tween English learners.
