= Navajos (river) =

River in Spain

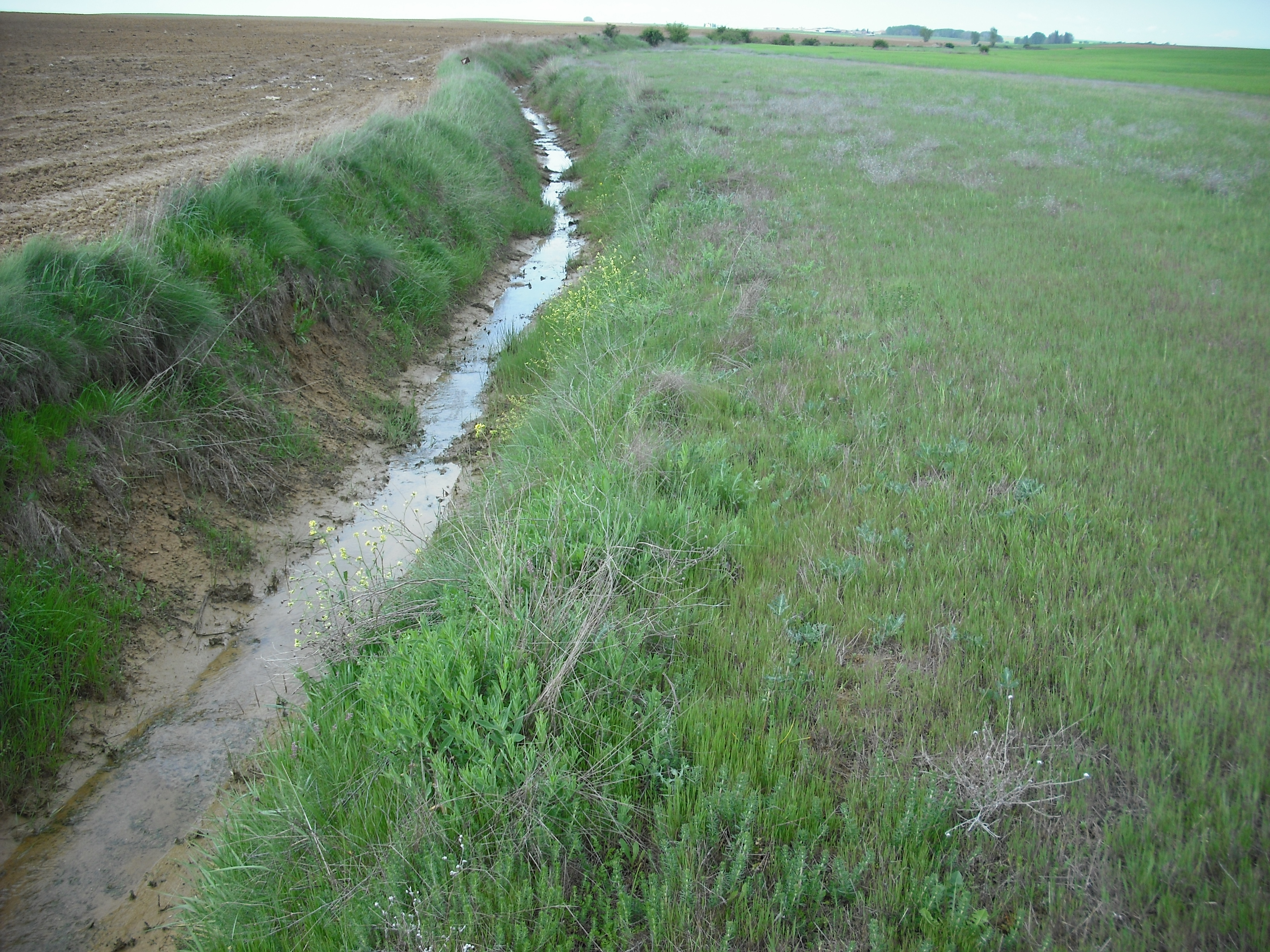
Source of the Navajos River at the confluence of the Fontihoyuelo and Villalón.

Navajos is a small Spanish river, in Castile and León. It is a tributary of Valderaduey. Its total length is 50 kilometres (31 mi).
