= Doron (Pliny) =

Doron or Dorio, as it is said to be written in some manuscripts, is a city mentioned only by Pliny and located in Cilicia Tracheia. Some scholars have equated the city to Darieium or Dorieium in Phrygia mentioned by Stephanus of Byzantium.
