= Poço Barreto halt =

Railway halt in Portugal

Poço Barreto halt Apeadeiro de Poço Barreto
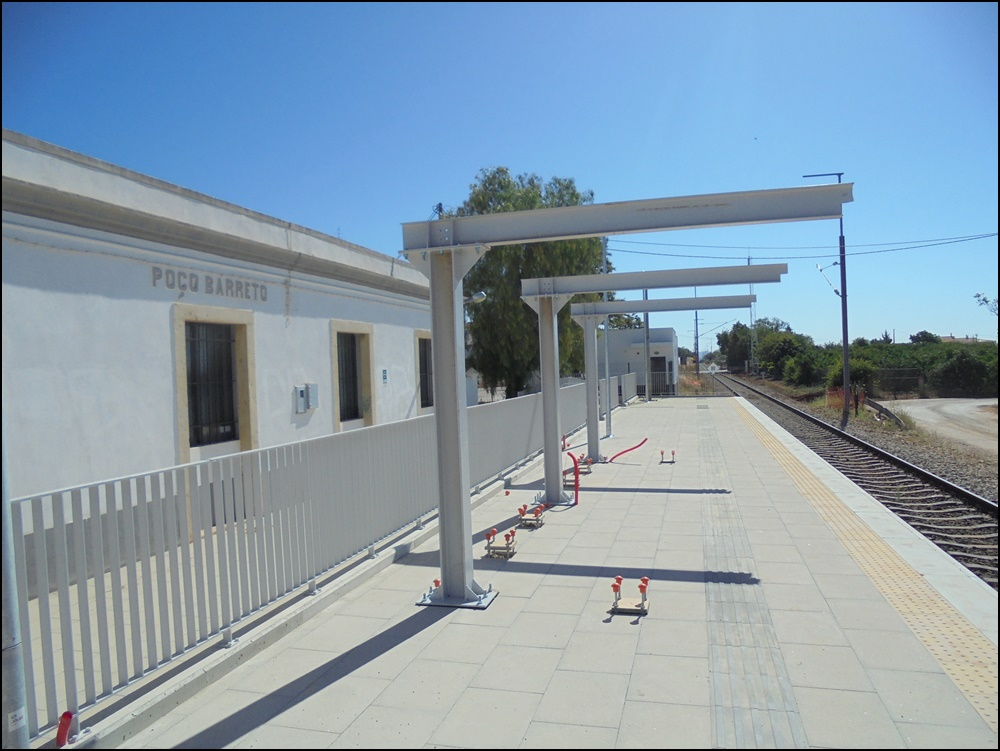
- Poço Barreto halt in May 2024

General information
- Location: Silves; Portugal
- Coordinates: 37°9′49.01″N 8°23′19.92″W
- Owner: Infraestruturas de Portugal
- Line: Linha do Algarve
- Platforms: 1
- Train operators: Comboios de Portugal

Construction
- Parking: yes
- Cycle facilities: yes
- Accessible: yes

History
- Opened: 19th of March de 1900

Services
Preceding station	Comboios de Portugal	Following station
Alcantarilha towards Faro	Regional	Silves towards Lagos
Location

Poço Barreto is a halt on the Algarve Line in the Silves municipality, Portugal. It was opened on 19 March de 1900, and served as terminus for the railway line until 1 February 1902, when the section to Silves was opened.

As of May 2024, work is under way to provide a longer and higher platform, together with new lighting, in readiness for the introduction of electric trains. No date known at this time.

== Services ==
This halt is used by regional trains, operated by Comboios de Portugal.
