= Vala halt =

Vala halt Apeadeiro de Vala

General information
- Location: Silves; Portugal
- Coordinates: 37°10′30.9″N 8°25′35.8″W
- Owner: Infraestruturas de Portugal
- Line: Linha do Algarve

History
- Opened: 1 February 1902
Location

Vala, originally spelt Valla, is a closed halt on the Algarve line in the Silves municipality, Portugal. It is part of the section from Silves to Ferragudo, which opened on 15 February 1903.
