= Mexilhoeira halt =

Mexilhoeira halt Paragem de Mexilhoeira
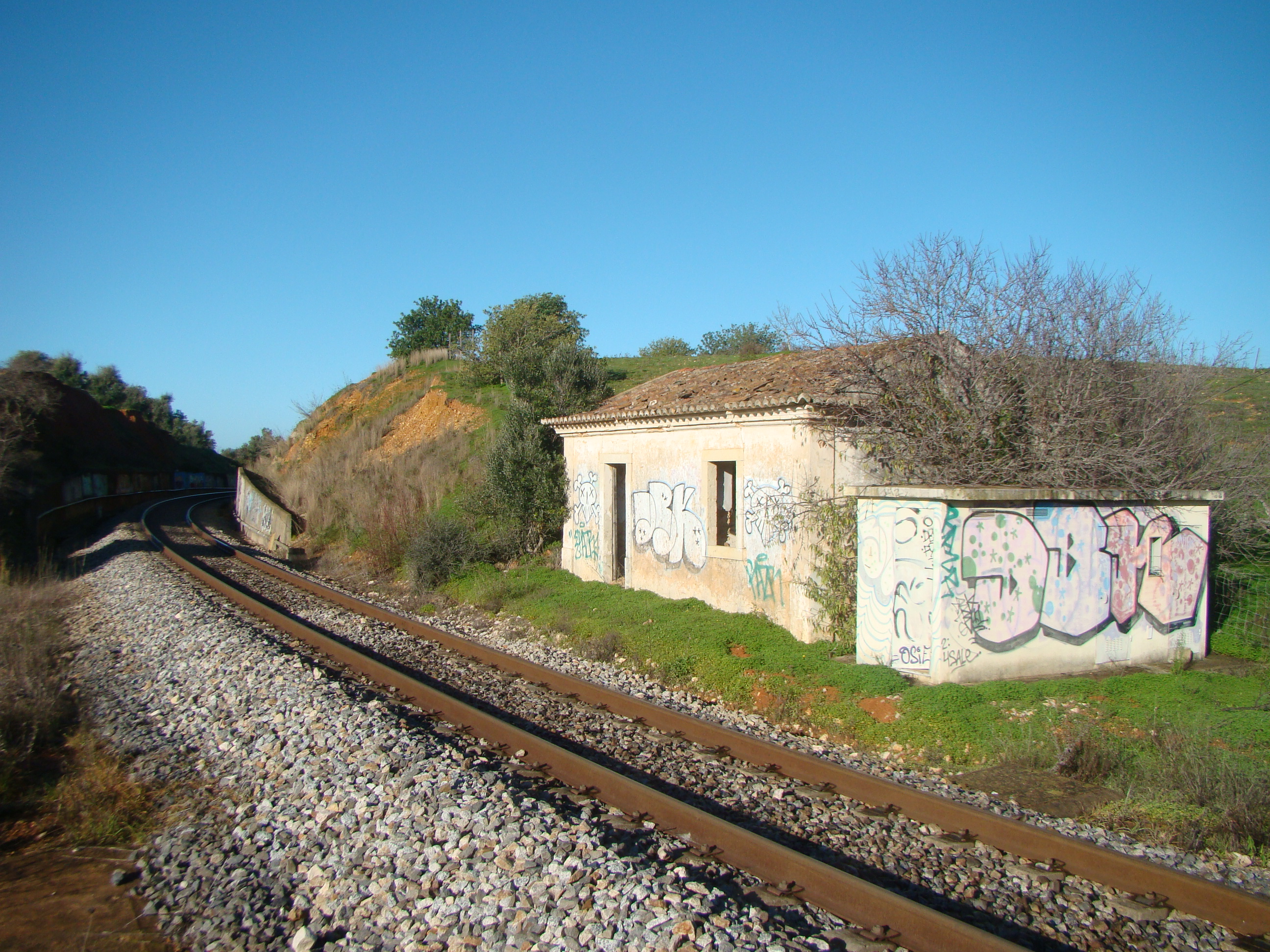
- Mexilhoeira halt in 2018

General information
- Location: Lagoa, Algarve; Portugal
- Coordinates: 37°8′28.45″N 8°29′47.33″W
- Owner: Infraestruturas de Portugal
- Line: Linha do Algarve

History
- Opened: February 16, 1903; 123 years ago
Location

Mexilhoeira is a closed halt on the Algarve line in the Lagoa municipality, Portugal. It is part of the section from Silves to Ferragudo, which opened on 15 February 1903.
