= Lameira halt =

Closed halt in Algarve line

Lameira halt Apeadeiro de Lameira
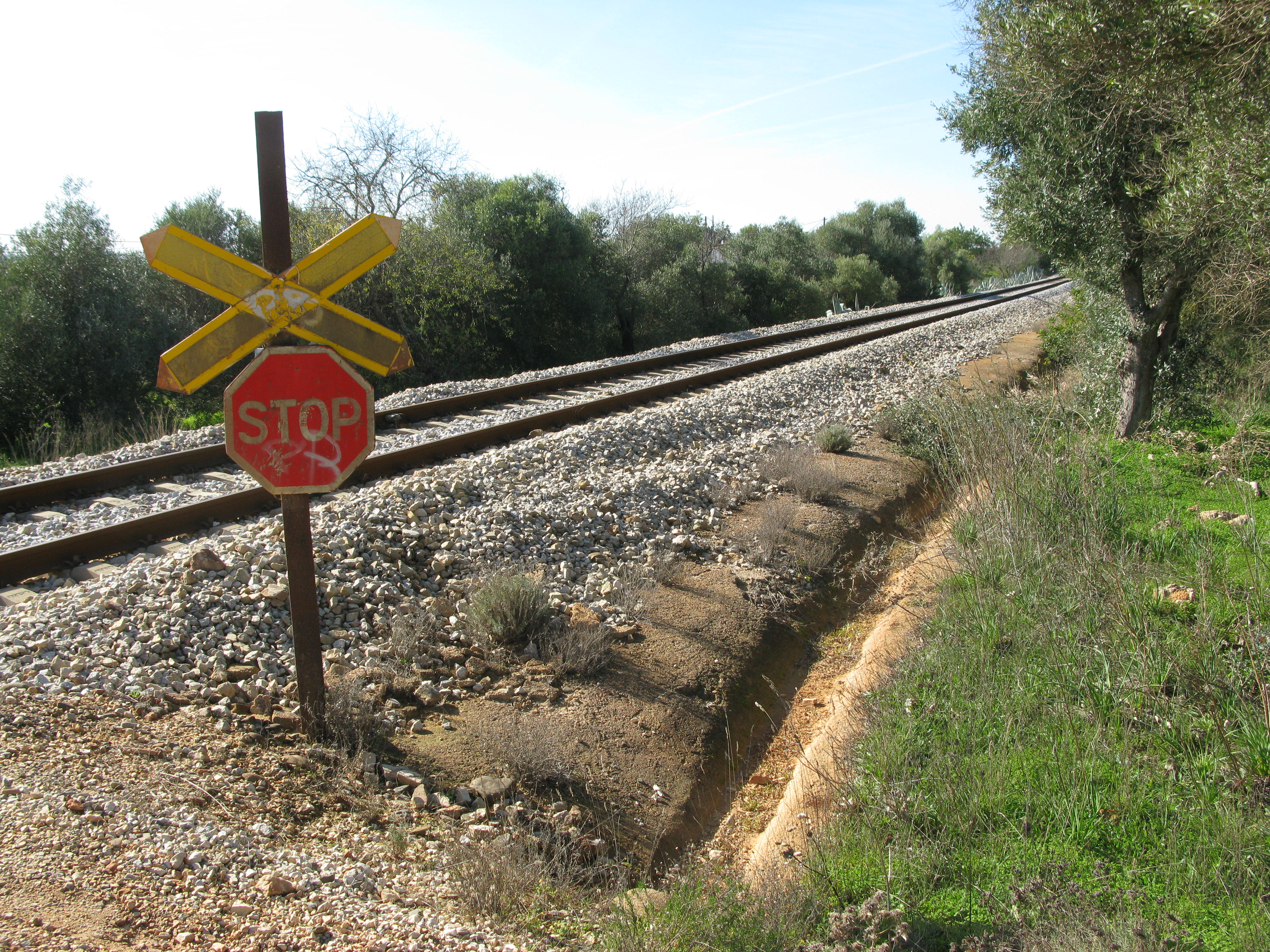
- The Lameira halt in 2018.

General information
- Location: Silves; Portugal
- Coordinates: 37°9′54.44″N 8°22′32.26″W
- Owner: Infraestruturas de Portugal
- Line: Algarve line

History
- Opened: 19 March 1900; 126 years ago
Location

Lameira is a closed halt on the Algarve line in the Silves municipality, Portugal. It is part of the section from Algoz to Poço Barreto, which opened on 19 March 1900.
