= Sobrado halt =

Railway halt in Portugal

Sobrado halt Apeadeiro de Sobrado
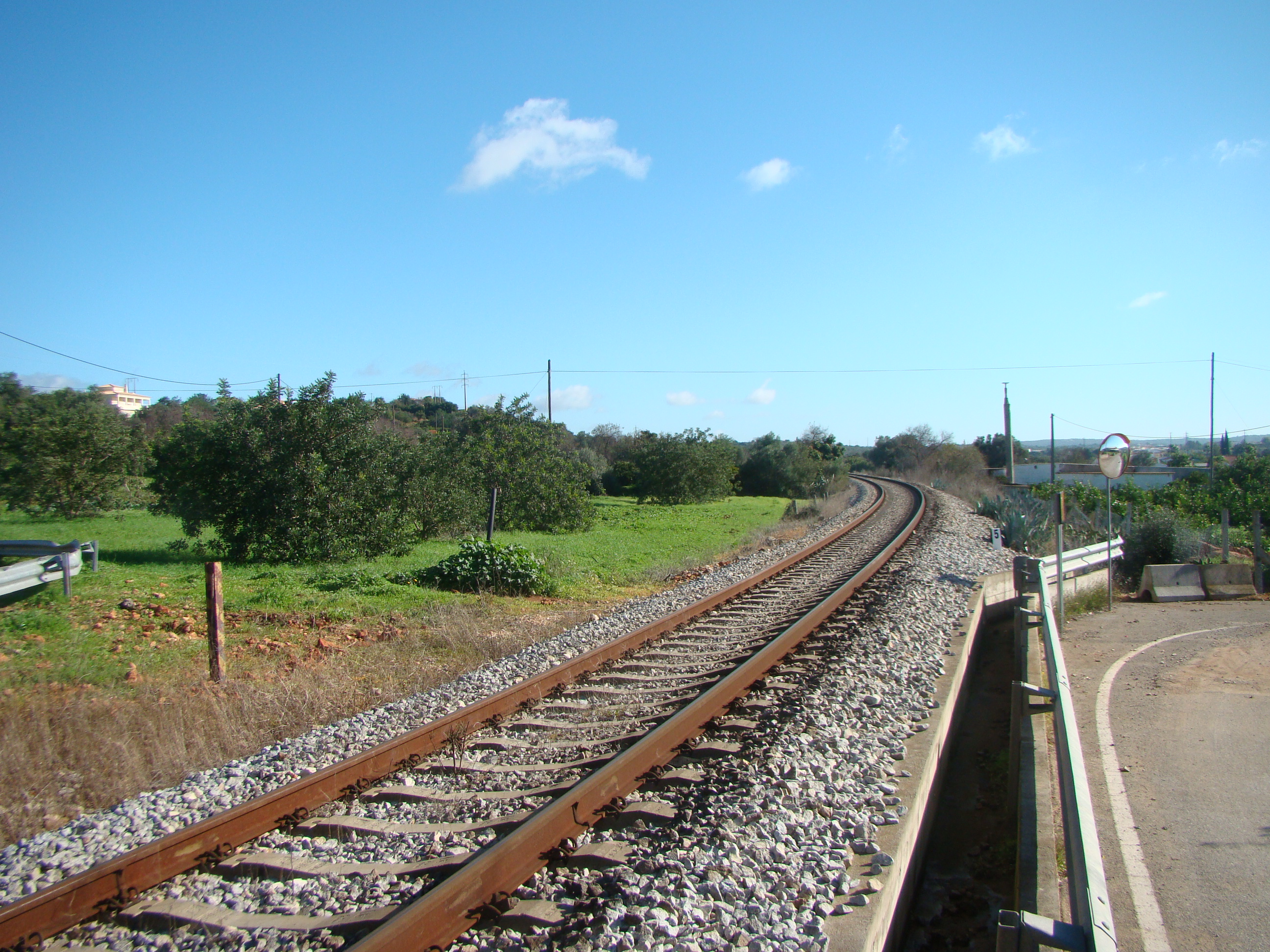
- Sobrado halt in 2018

General information
- Location: Silves; Portugal
- Coordinates: 37°10′21.03″N 8°19′51.87″W
- Owner: Infraestruturas de Portugal
- Line: Linha do Algarve

History
- Opened: 19 March 1900
Location

Sobrado is a closed halt on the Algarve line in the municipality of Silves, Portugal. It is part of the section from Algoz to Poço Barreto, which opened on 19 March 1900.
