= Meia Praia halt =

Railway station in Portugal

Meia Praia
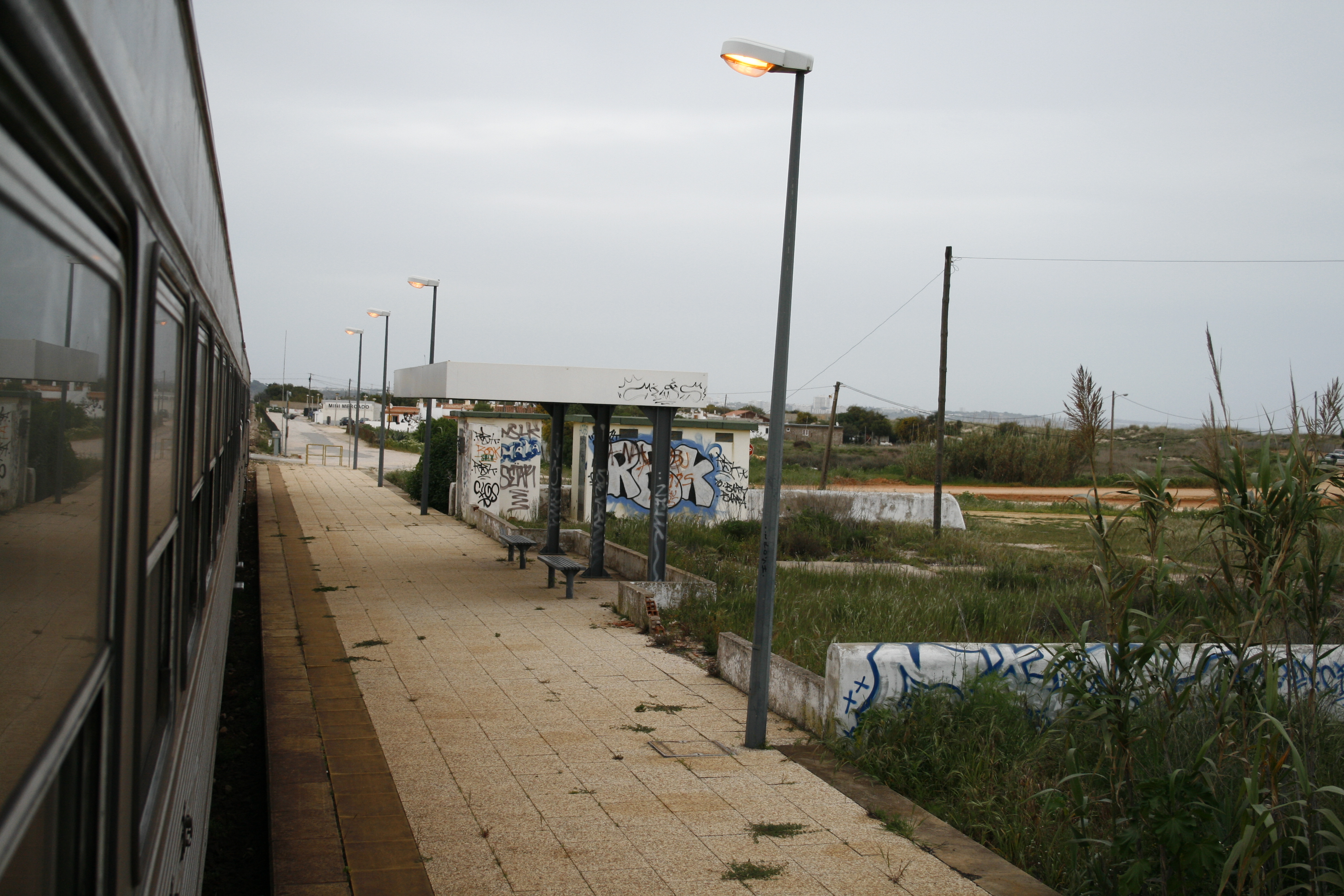
- Meia Praia halt in 2010

General information
- Location: Lagos; Portugal
- Coordinates: 37°7′6.83″N 8°38′51.16″W
- Owner: Infraestruturas de Portugal
- Line: Linha do Algarve
- Platforms: 1
- Train operators: Comboios de Portugal

Services
Preceding station	Comboios de Portugal	Following station
Mexilhoeira Grande towards Faro	Regional	Lagos Terminus
Location

Meia Praia is a halt on the Algarve Line in the Lagos municipality, Portugal.

== Services ==
This halt is used by regional trains, operated by Comboios de Portugal.
