= Alcantarilha railway station =

Railway station in Portugal

Alcantarilha railway station Estação Ferroviária de Alcantarilha
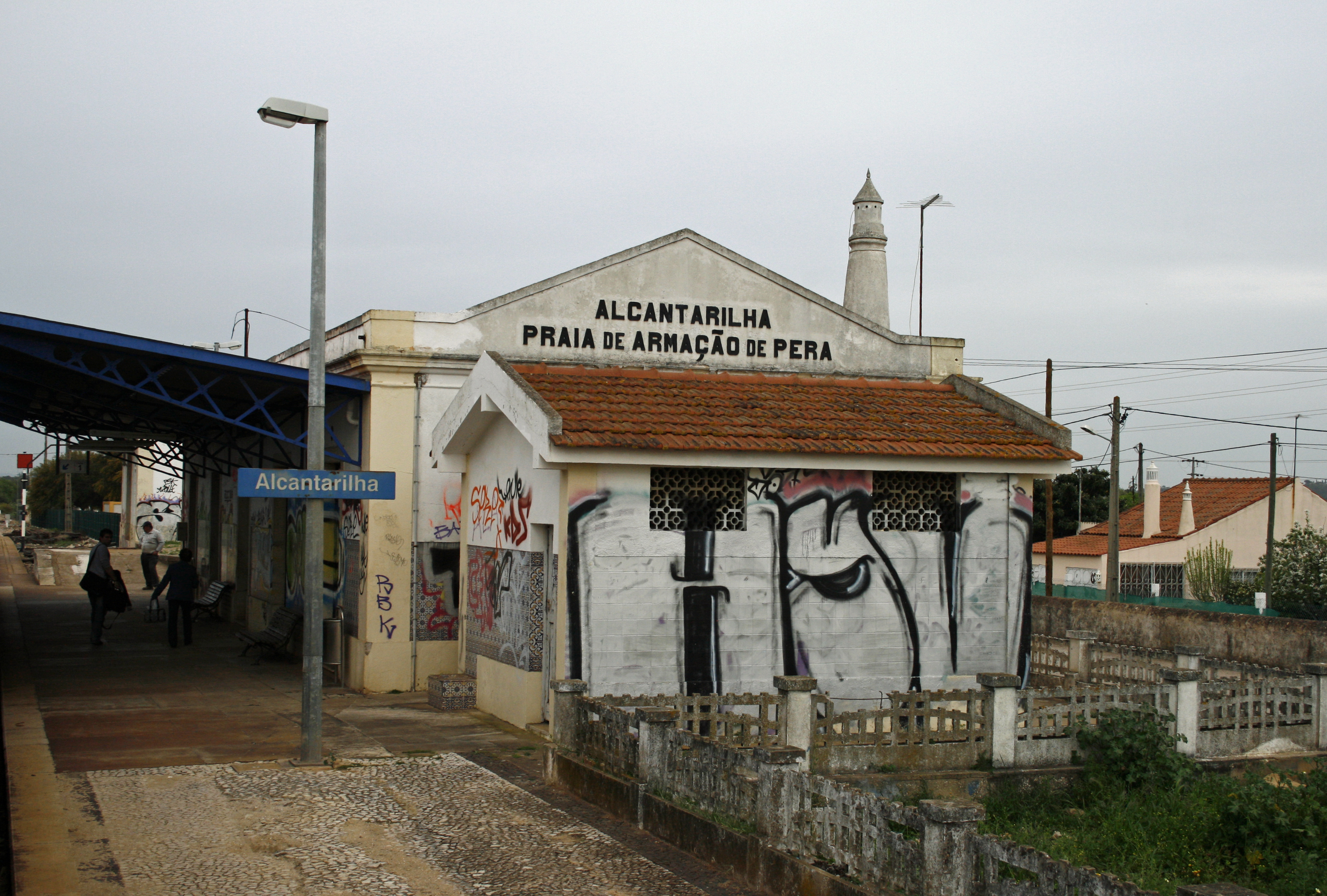
- Alcantarilha station in 2010

General information
- Location: Silves, Faro; Portugal
- Coordinates: 37°10′11.59″N 8°20′55.52″W
- Owner: Infraestruturas de Portugal
- Line: Linha do Algarve
- Platforms: 2
- Train operators: Comboios de Portugal

History
- Opened: 19 March 1900; 126 years ago

Services
Preceding station	Comboios de Portugal	Following station
Algoz towards Faro	Regional	Poço Barreto towards Lagos
Algoz towards Faro	Regional	Silves towards Lagos
Location

Alcantarilha is a railway station on the Algarve line which serves Alcantarilha and Armação de Pêra, in the Silves municipality, Portugal. It opened on 19 March 1900.
