= Mexilhoeira Grande railway station =

Railway station in Portugal

Mexilhoeira Grande railway station Estação Ferroviária de Mexilhoeira Grande
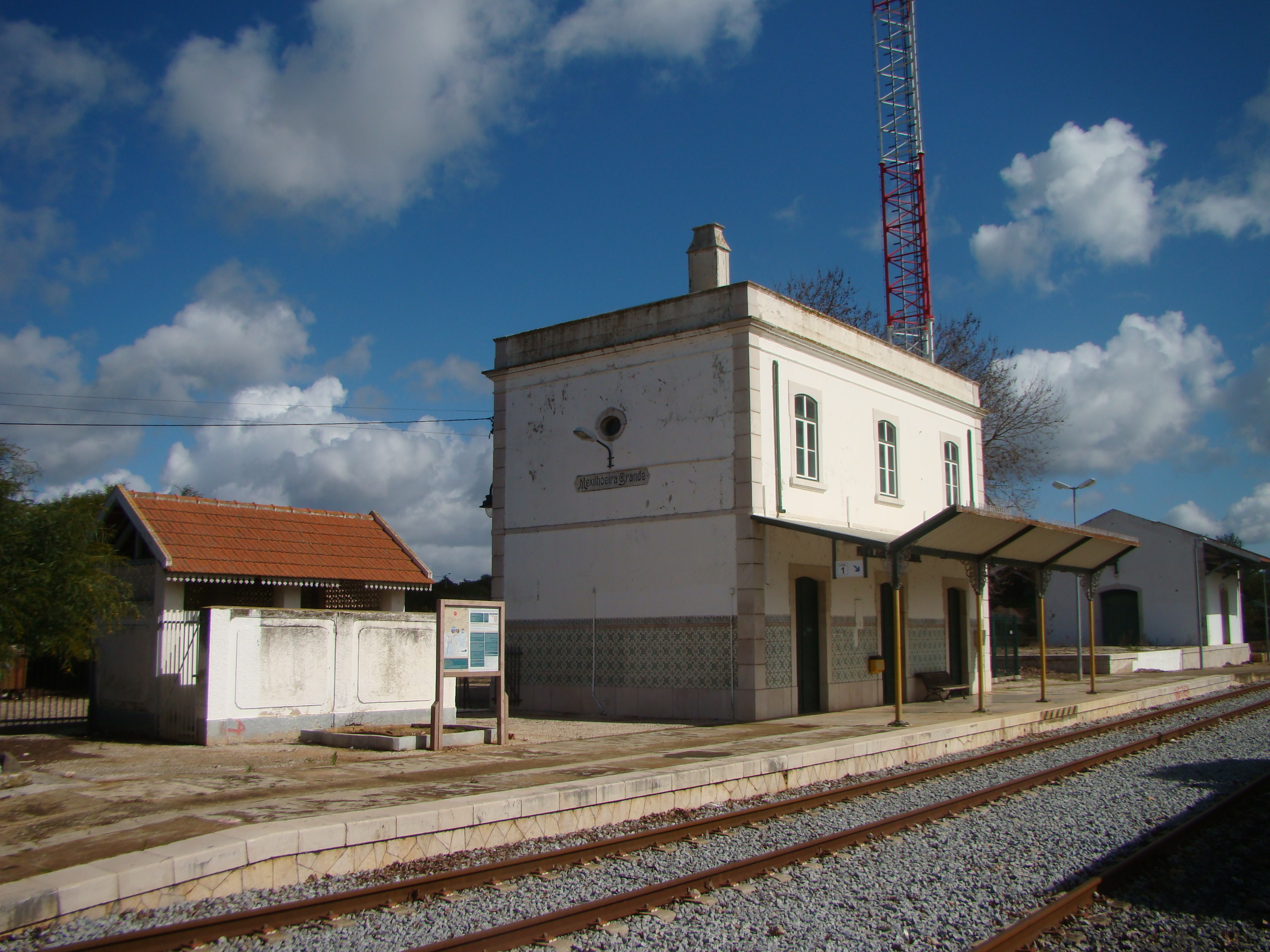
- Mexilhoeira Grande station in 2018

General information
- Location: Estrada da Estação Ferroviária; Mexilhoeira Grande, Portimão; Portugal
- Coordinates: 37°9′15.19″N 8°36′34.56″W
- Owner: Infraestruturas de Portugal
- Line: Linha do Algarve
- Platforms: 2
- Train operators: Comboios de Portugal

History
- Opened: 30 July 1922

Services
Preceding station	Comboios de Portugal	Following station
Portimão towards Faro	Regional	Meia Praia towards Lagos
Portimão towards Faro	Regional	Lagos Terminus
Location

Mexilhoeira Grande is a railway station on the Algarve line, which serves Mexilhoeira Grande, in the Portimão municipality, Portugal. It opened on 30 July 1922.
