= Portimão railway station =

Railway station in Portugal

Portimão
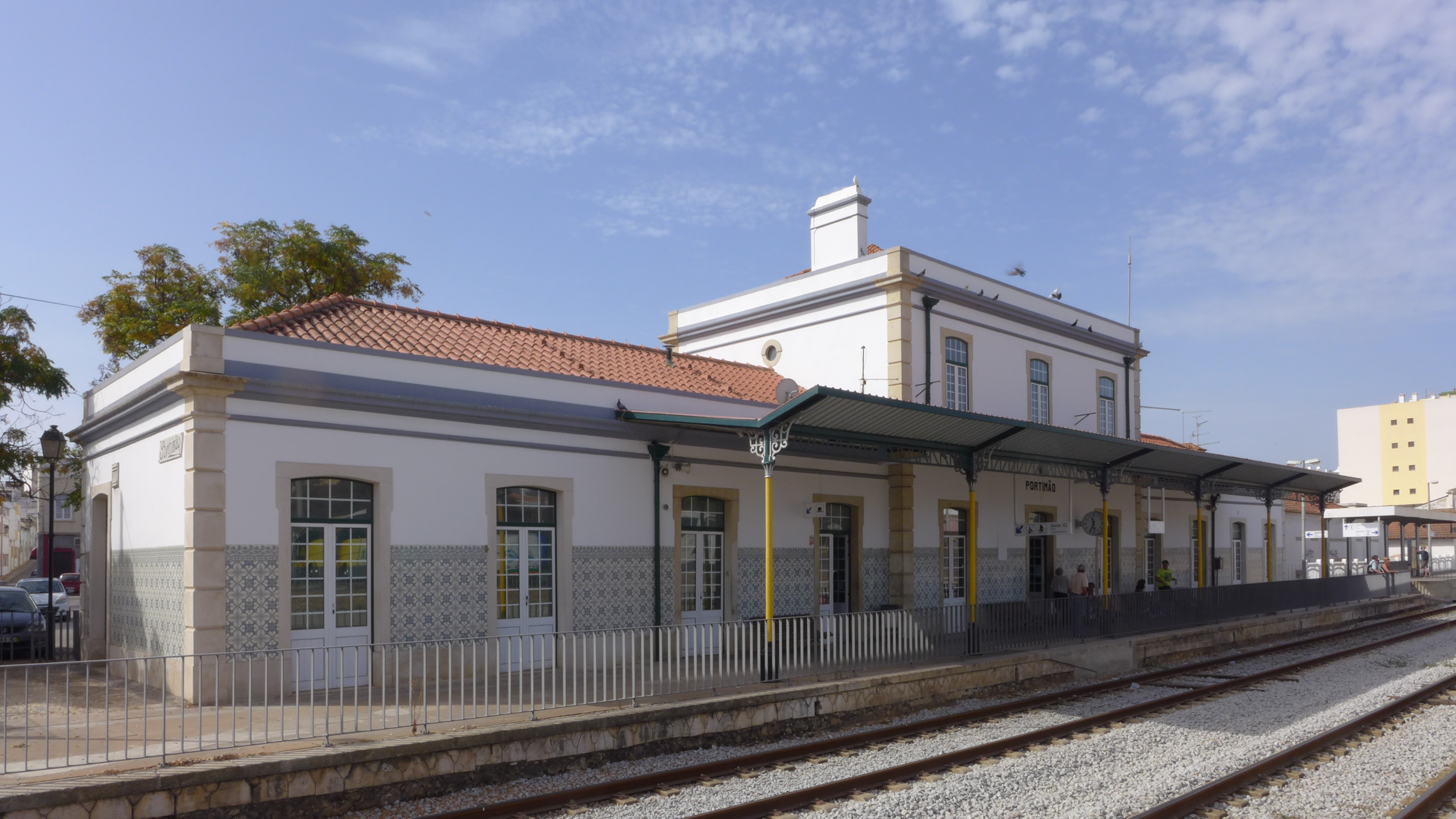
- Portimão railway station, 2017

General information
- Location: Rua Cruz d Pedra, Portimão; Portugal
- Coordinates: 37.1446°N 8.5375°W
- Operator: Comboios de Portugal
- Line: Algarve line

History
- Opened: July 30, 1922; 104 years ago

Services
Preceding station	Comboios de Portugal	Following station
Ferragudo towards Faro	Regional	Mexilhoeira Grande towards Lagos
Location

Portimão station (Portuguese: Estação de Portimão) is the main railway station in the city of Portimão, Portugal, operated by Comboios de Portugal. It opened on 30 July 1922.
