= Estômbar-Lagoa railway station =

Railway station in Portugal

Estômbar-Lagoa railway station Estação Ferroviária de Estômbar-Lagoa
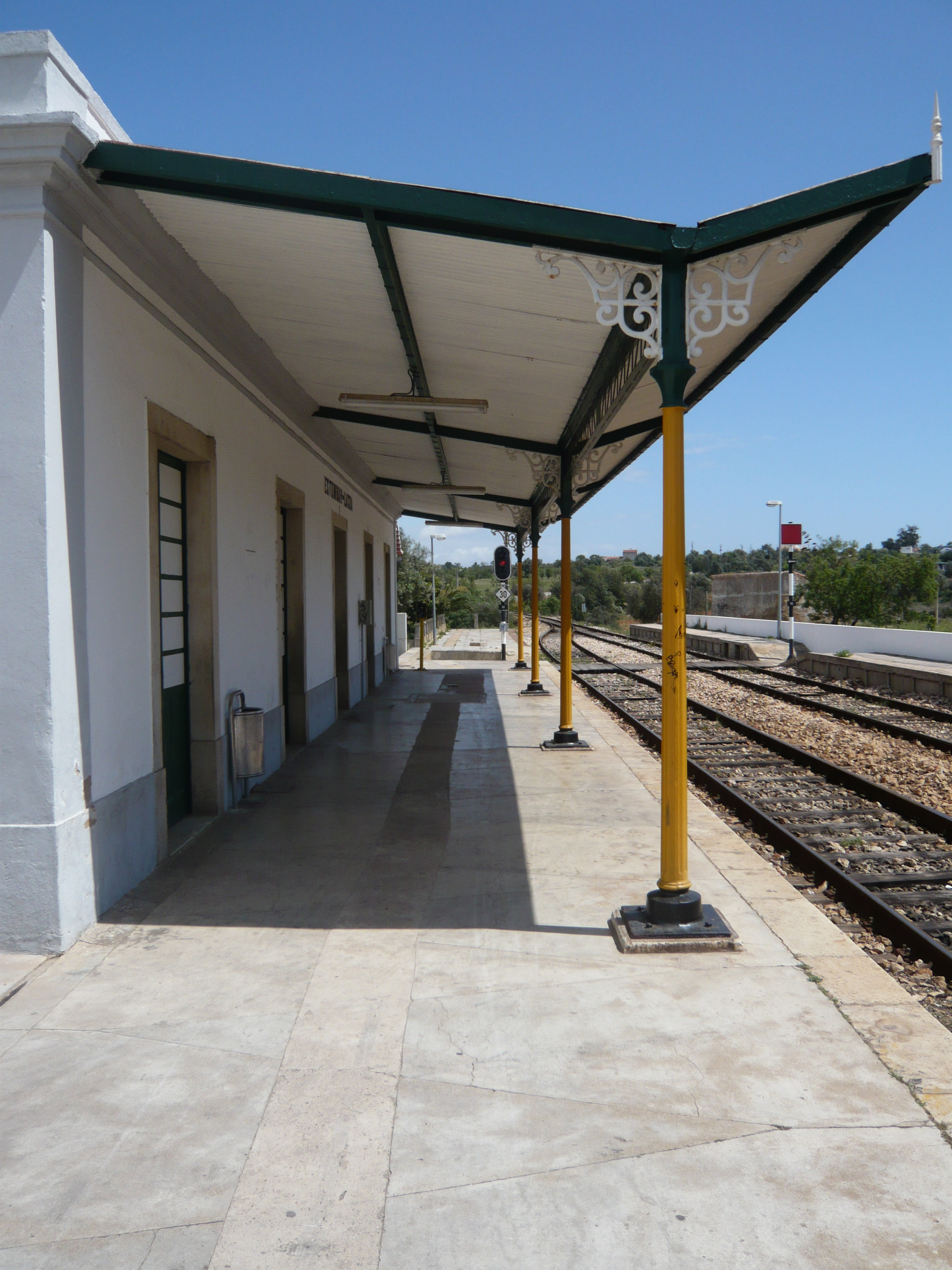
- Estômbar-Lagoa station in 2008

General information
- Location: Lagoa; Portugal
- Coordinates: 37°8′36.51″N 8°29′7.96″W
- Owner: Infraestruturas de Portugal
- Line: Linha do Algarve
- Platforms: 2
- Tracks: 2
- Train operators: Comboios de Portugal

History
- Opened: 15 February 1903; 123 years ago

Services
Preceding station	Comboios de Portugal	Following station
Silves towards Faro	Regional	Ferragudo towards Lagos
Location

Estômbar-Lagoa railway station (Portuguese: Estação Ferroviária de Estômbar-Lagoa) is a railway station on the Algarve line which serves Lagoa Municipality and is located in Estômbar, Portugal. It opened on 15 February 1903.

== History ==
On 8 November 1997, two trains crashed close to Estômbar, killing four people and injuring 14.
