= Vale da Lama halt =

Vale da Lama halt Apeadeiro de Vale de Lama

General information
- Location: Lagoa; Portugal
- Coordinates: 37°10′30.91″N 8°25′35.82″W
- Owner: Infraestruturas de Portugal
- Line: Linha do Algarve

History
- Opened: 1 February 1902
Location

Vale da Lama is a closed halt on the Algarve line in the Lagoa municipality, Portugal. It opened on 1 February 1902.
