= Vila Real de Santo António railway station =

Railway station in southeast Portugal

Vila Real de Santo António station Estação Ferroviária de Vila Real de Santo António
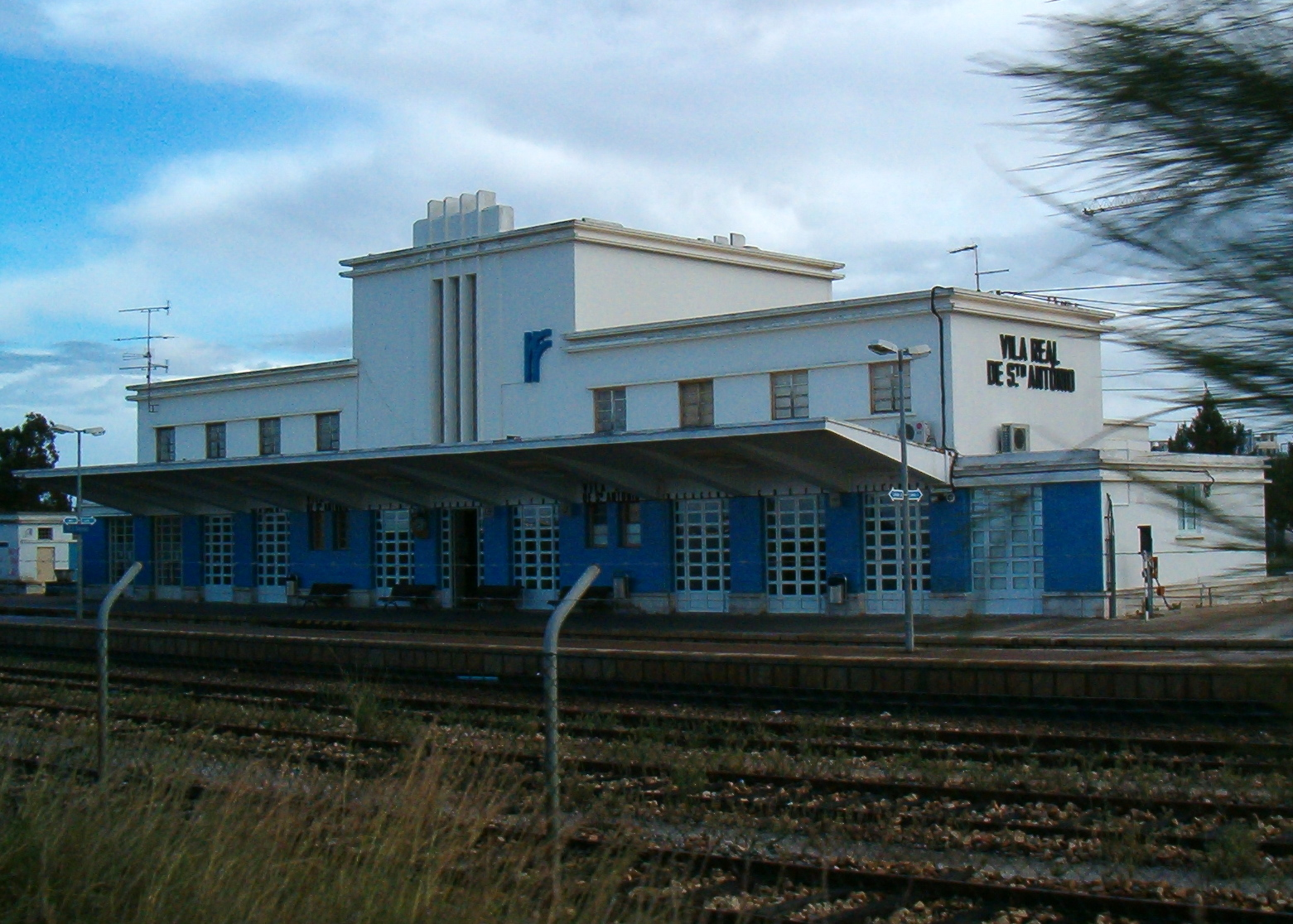
- Vila Real de Santo Antonio station, 2008

General information
- Location: Vila Real de Santo António; Portugal
- Coordinates: 37.19969°N 7.42157°W
- Elevation: 5 m (16 ft)
- Line: Linha do Algarve (1906–present)
- Tracks: 3

History
- Opened: 14 April 1906

Services
Preceding station	Comboios de Portugal	Following station
Terminus	Regional	Monte Gordo towards Faro
Terminus	Regional	Cacela towards Faro
Location

The Vila Real de Santo António railway station is a station on the Algarve line that serves the city of Vila Real de Santo António, in the district of Faro, Portugal. The original station went into service on 14 April 1906, and the new building was inaugurated on 4 September 1945.

== History ==
=== Planning and construction ===
On 13 May 1904, a decree was published ordering studies to be carried out for the installation of the Vila Real de Santo António station, on the site that had been preferred by the population. It was then expected that the locomotives would arrive in Vila Real de Santo António within a year or so.

On 11 January 1905, a tender was held for earthworks in the stretch from Cacela to Vila Real de Santo António.

One of the reasons for opening the line to Vila Real de Santo António was the need to better serve the agricultural fields in the eastern Algarve by rail.

=== Inauguration ===
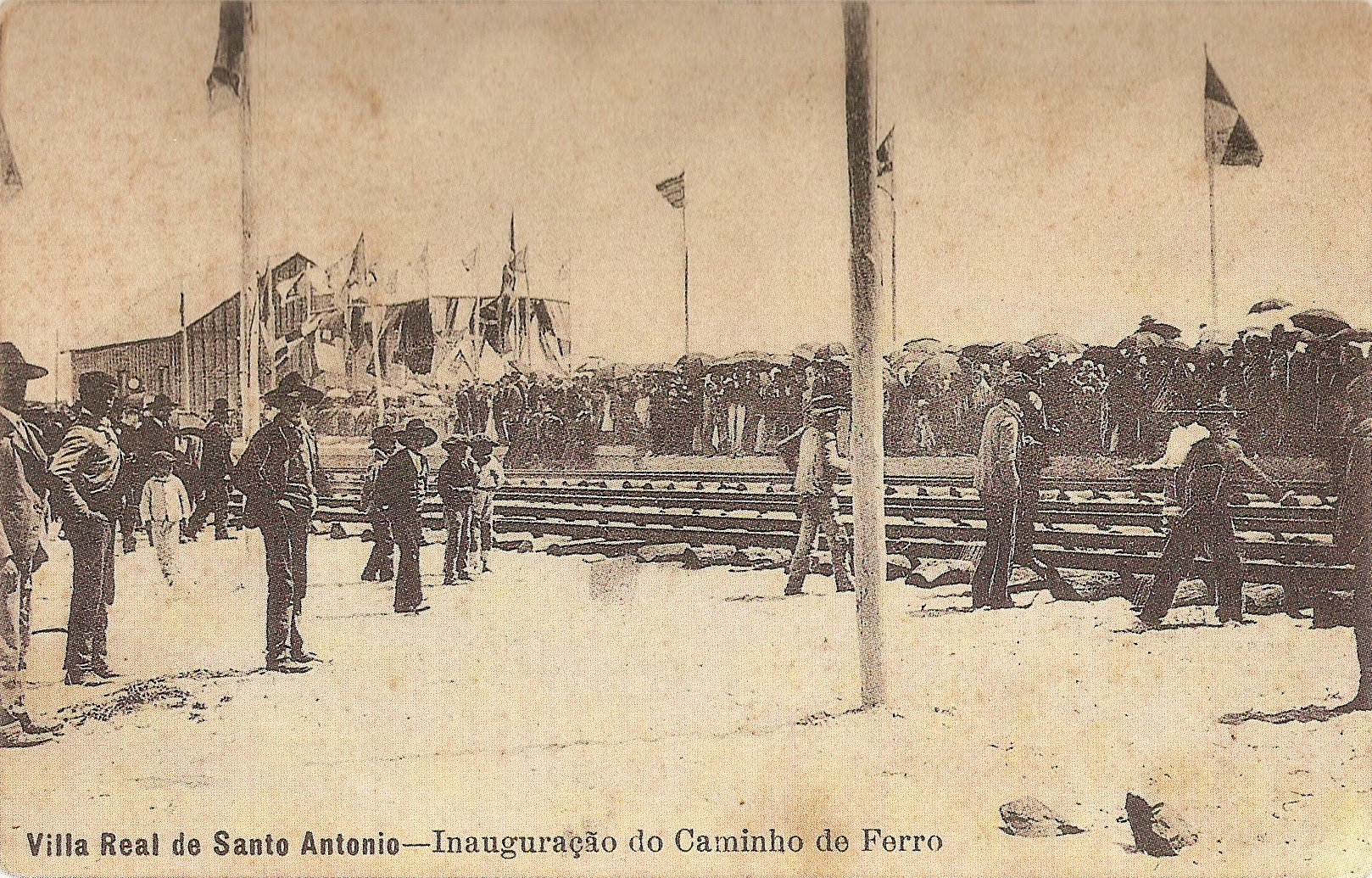
Inauguration of the old Vila Real de Santo Antonio railway station

The section between Tavira and Vila Real de Santo António entered service on 14 April 1906 and was then considered part of the South Line. However, the inauguration was criticised in an article published in Tavira's O Heraldo newspaper, which accused the government of having opened the line to traffic before it was completely finished, in order to benefit political circles in the eastern Algarve. According to the article, the Vila Real de Santo António railway station entered service without meeting the necessary conditions for its functions, and the houses for the staff, the remise and the turntable, among other infrastructures, had yet to be built.

=== 1930s–1940s ===
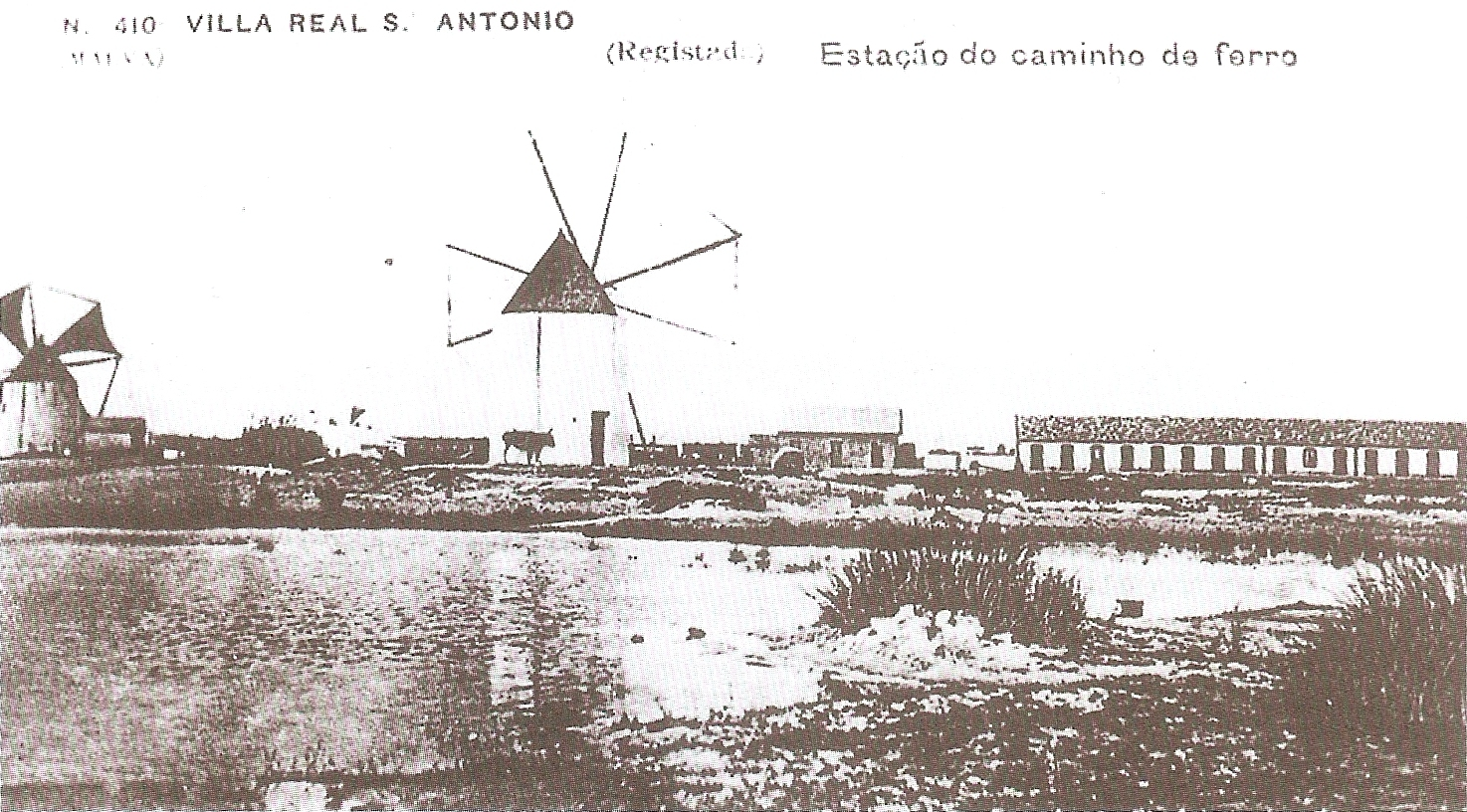
Old Vila Real de Santo António station

Vila Real de Santo António's first station was located in an area that was then far from the city and the river, so that an international bridge could be built in the future to connect it to the Spanish railway network. However, this created access difficulties, making it necessary to cross an area of sand and marshland to reach the station.

The installation of a new interface was therefore planned, and in 1940 a brigade of engineers visited Vila Real de Santo António to choose the site for the new station. Meanwhile, the design for the new station building had already been drawn up by the architect Cottinelli Telmo in 1936. On 4 September 1945, the new interface was inaugurated.

=== 1950s–1960s ===
In the early 1950s, the station housed a delegation from the National Information Secretariat.

On 1 November 1954, the automotive services between Lagos and Vila Real de Santo António began. In 1956, the Compagnie Internationale des Wagons-Lits ran three services on the trains between Barreiro and Vila Real de Santo António: one with sleeping cars, one with dining cars and one with canteens.

On 20 June 1969, the Board of Directors of Companhia dos Caminhos de Ferro Portugueses approved the creation of excursion trains between Vila Real de Santo António and Lisbon, as a way of combating the growing competition from road transport in the southern region.

=== 1990s ===
In 1991, the Inter-regional trains between Vila Real de Santo António and Lagos began circulation.

=== 21st century ===
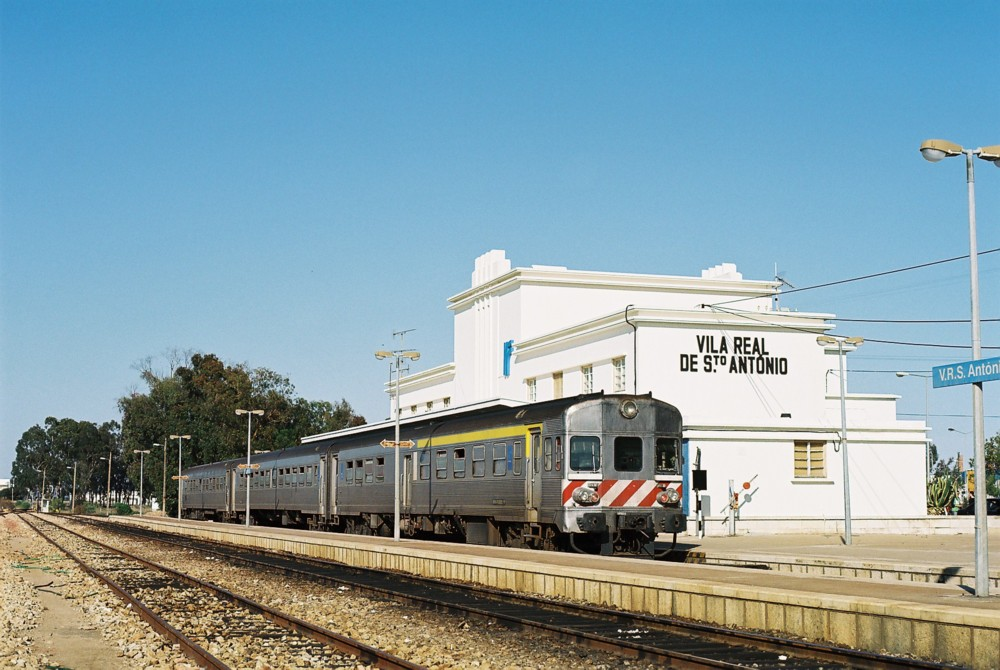
Train arriving at the Vila Real de Santo António railway station

By January 2011, this station had three tracks, two 437 meters long and the third 407 meters long; only the first two lines had platforms, both 133 meters long, the first 35 centimeters high and the second 40 centimeters high — values later changed to the current ones.

== See also ==
- Infraestruturas de Portugal
- Rail transport in Portugal
- History of rail transport in Portugal
