= Alcantarilha =

- Civil parish
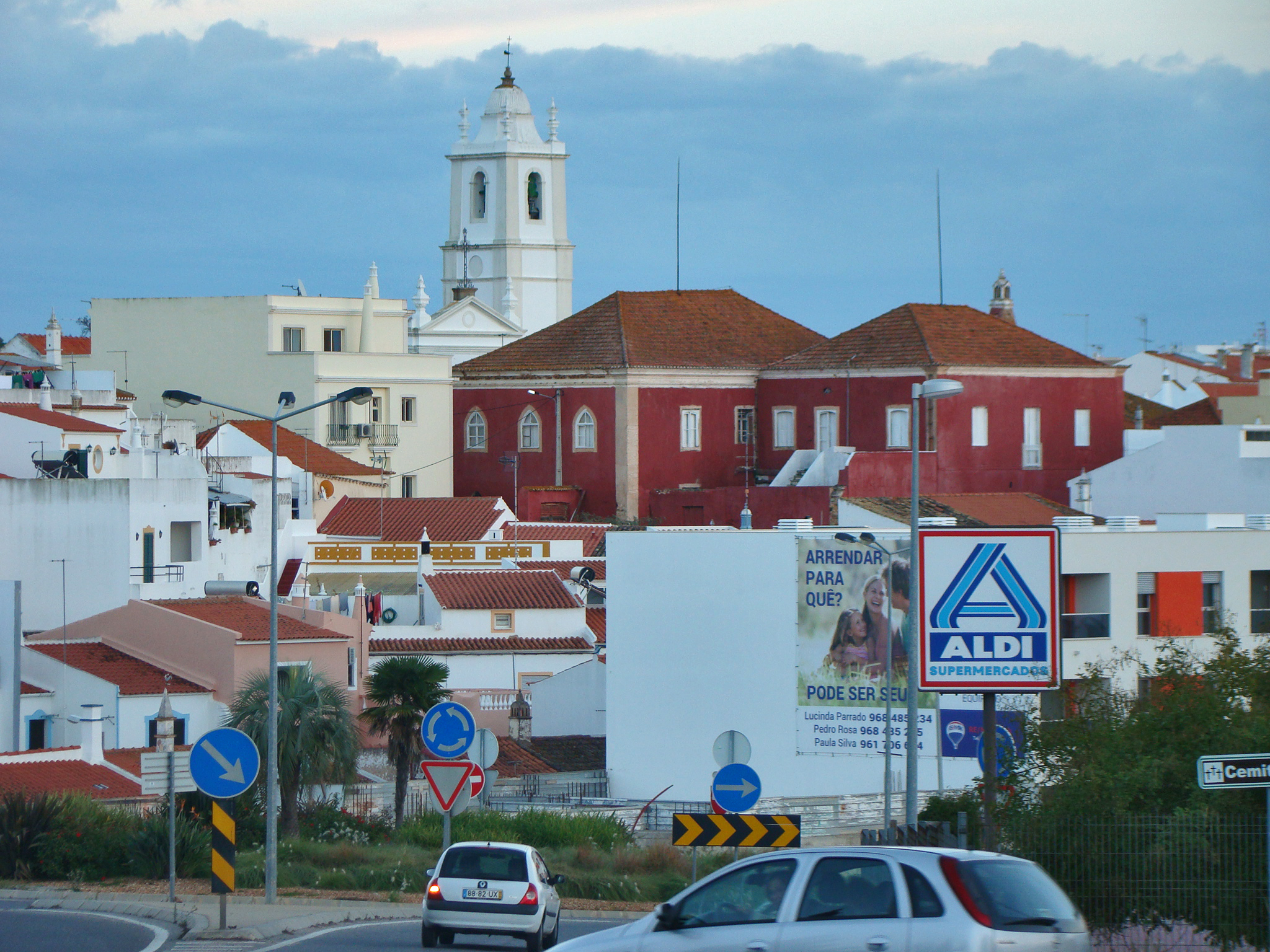
- View of Alcantarilha

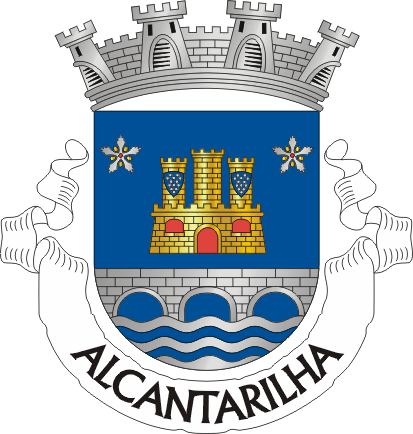
- Coat of arms

- Location in Portugal
- Coordinates: 37°9′52″N 8°21′29″W
- Country: Portugal
- Region: Algarve
- Intermunic. comm.: Algarve
- District: Faro
- Municipality: Silves

Area
  - Total: 19.54 km^{2} (7.54 sq mi)
- Elevation: 26 m (85 ft)

Population (2001)
  - Total: 2,347
  - Density: 120.1/km^{2} (311.1/sq mi)
- Time zone: UTC+00:00 (WET)
  - Summer (DST): UTC+01:00 (WEST)
- Postal code: 8365
- Area code: 282
- Patron: Nossa Senhora da Conceição
- Website: www.jf-alcantarilha.pt

Alcantarilha (European Portuguese pronunciation: [alkɐ̃tɐˈɾiʎɐ]) is a former civil parish in the municipality of Silves, Portugal. In 2013, the parish merged into the new parish Alcantarilha e Pêra. With an area of 19.54 square kilometres (7.54 mi^{2}) the population of 2347 inhabitants (based on the 2001 census) is dispersed throughout the territory (there are 120 inhabitants per kilometre square of territory).

== History ==
The territory of Silves has been occupied since the Paleolithic, and testaments of human presence in Alcantarilha can be traced back to the fossil beaches in Torre and Morgado das Relvas, along the coast. The first settlement in Alcantarilha, developed during the pre-Roman era. The primitive agglomeration concentrated around a defensible area at the end of the settlement. From the inventory by the Direcção Geral dos Edifícios e Monumentos Nacionais (General-Directorate on Buildings and National Monuments), this settlement consisted of a Lusitanian castro bridging the Neolithic and Chalcolithic eras. This space was also a transit point for Phoenicians, Greek and Carthaginian traders.

The name Alcantarilha appears to have its origin in Arab settlement/occupation, from the word al-quanTarâ, which meant bridge, viaduct or aqueduct, while the addition of the diminutive ilha implied a Roman or Mozarab influence, to indicate "small bridge".

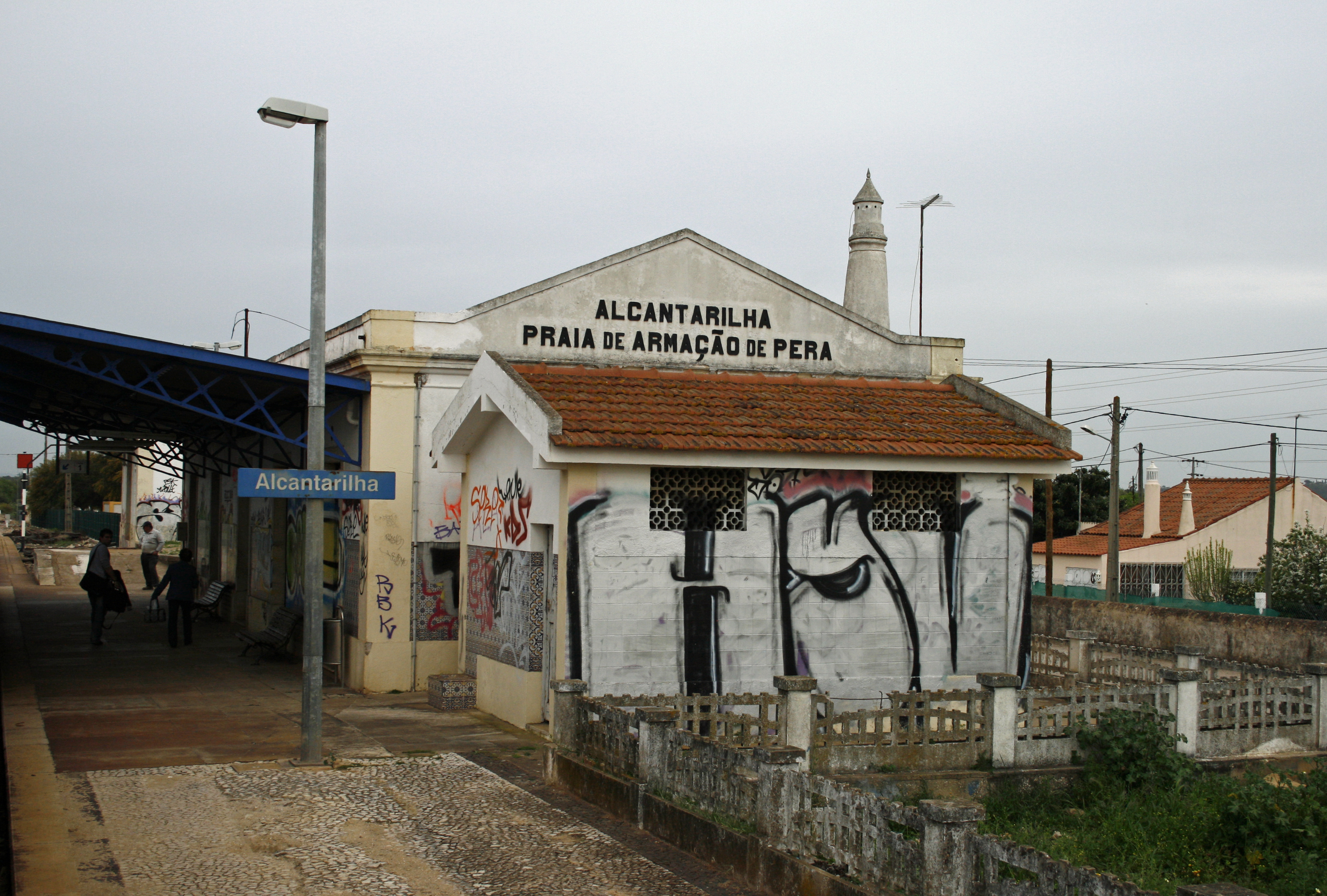
The former rail station of Alcantarilha-Armação de Pêra, hinting at Alcantarilha's history with its neighbouring parish

During the Middle Ages, and beginning of the modern era, little is known about the activities of the communities of Alcantarilha, except for activities related with the defense of the Algarve coast and rare descriptions of the settlement in the 16th century. The oldest description came from 1573, and reflected by João Cascão, King Sebastian's personal chronicler, who accompanied the king through the Algarve to survey the defenses along the coast. The monarch had ordered the completion of the walls of Alcantarilha in 1571, which were part of a project began in the reign of John III. King Sebastian visited on 28 January 1573 for a short visit, to find the project completed. João Cascão left behind a historical account, on the small "hamlet" of Alcantarilha, that included 150 neighbours and completely encircled by a wall of bulwarks.

For a while the civil parish oscillated between two parish seats: Pêra and Armação de Pêra. Until 1683, Pera (the parish seat) was linked to Alcantarilha, when bishop José de Menezes de-annexed the community, and included it in the municipality of Albufeira. Armação de Pêra, therefore, became the new parish seat until 1933, when Armação de Pêra also achieved territorial autonomy, and was de-annexed from Alcantarilha, to form its own parish.

On 4 February 1999, PS deputy Jorge Valente (elected in the Algarve) brought before the National Assembly a petition to formally elevate the urban seat of Alcantarilha to the status of vila (town). This project was approved in plenary on 13 May 1999, and proclaimed on 1 November 1999.

== Architecture ==
=== Civic ===
- Manor of the Mascarenhas Marreiros Leite (Portuguese: Solar dos Mascarenhas Marreiros Leite/Capela das Artes)
- Railway Station of Alcantarilha-Armação de Pêra (Portuguese: Estação Ferroviária de Alcantarilha-Praia de Armação de Pêra)

=== Military ===
- Castle of Alcantarilha (Portuguese: Castelo de Alcantarilha/Muralhas de Alcantarilha)

=== Religious ===
- Church of Nossa Senhora da Conceição (Portuguese: Igreja Paroquial de Alcantarilha/Igreja Nossa Senhora da Conceição), the parochial church of Alcantarilha, from the 16th century, is marked its Manueline-era main chapel with gilded retable (dating to the 18th century), a 17th-century tiled ashlar baptismal chapel and sacristy, highlighted by niche in acanthus leaves (also from the 18th century). Alongside the main nave is the Capela dos Ossos (Chapel of Bones), located on the southern lateral annex; this chapel is constructed completely of approximately 1500 skulls and thigh bones, arranged in lateral bands and surmounted by a Romanesque arch;
- Church of the Misericórdia of Alcantarilha (Portuguese: Igreja da Misericórdia de Alcantarilha)

== Notable citizens ==
- José António Mendonça (Alcantarilha, 21 July 1800 — Lisbon, 17 February 1870), Baron of Alcantarilha and Jaraguá;
- Sebastião José Mendonça, Baron of Alcantarilha; brother of José António Mendonça
- José Diogo Mascarenhas Neto, the first Superintendent-General for the Mail and Post (Superintendente Geral dos Correios e Postas do Reino), who revolutionized the Portuguese postal system (1799–1805), and was responsible for the elimination of the Office of High-Courier
- João Ortigão Peres, military officer
- José Joaquim Rasquinho, painter, responsible for the paintings in the Church of Santo António, in Lagos, and Church of the Lay Carmelites, in Tavira
