= Ferragudo halt =

Railway halt in Portugal

Ferragudo halt Apeadeiro de Ferragudo
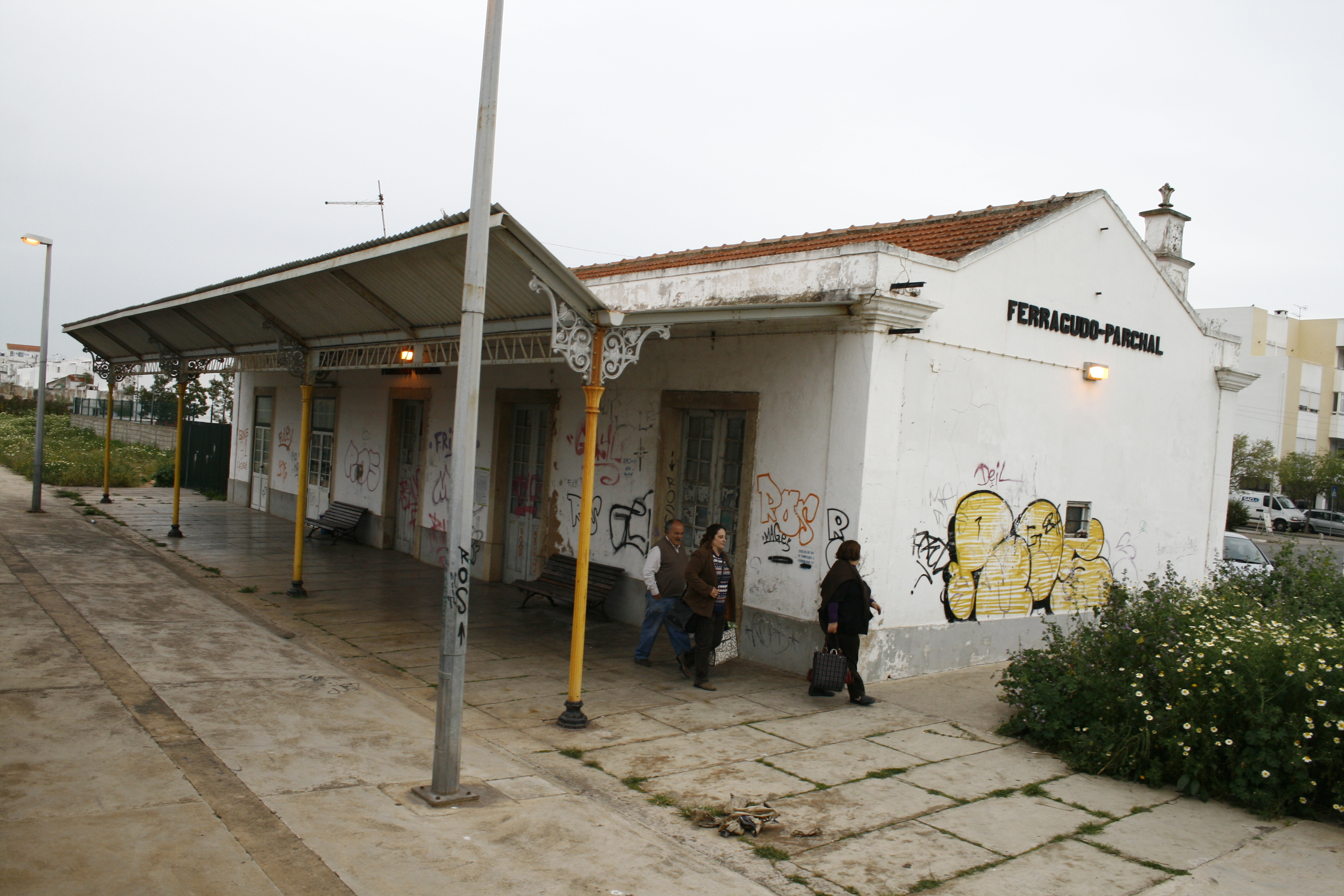

General information
- Location: Lagoa; Portugal
- Coordinates: 37°8′19.4″N 8°31′8.93″W
- Owner: Infraestruturas de Portugal
- Line: Linha do Algarve
- Platforms: 1
- Train operators: Comboios de Portugal

Services
Preceding station	Comboios de Portugal	Following station
Estômbar-Lagoa towards Faro	Regional	Portimão towards Lagos
Location

Ferragudo is a halt on the Algarve Line in the Lagoa municipality, Portugal. It was opened on 15 February 1903, under the name Portimão. After the construction and opening of the Portimão Railway Bridge and station, in 1922, the name was changed to Ferragudo.

== Services ==
This halt is used by regional trains, operated by Comboios de Portugal.
