= Algoz halt =

Railway halt in Portugal

Algoz
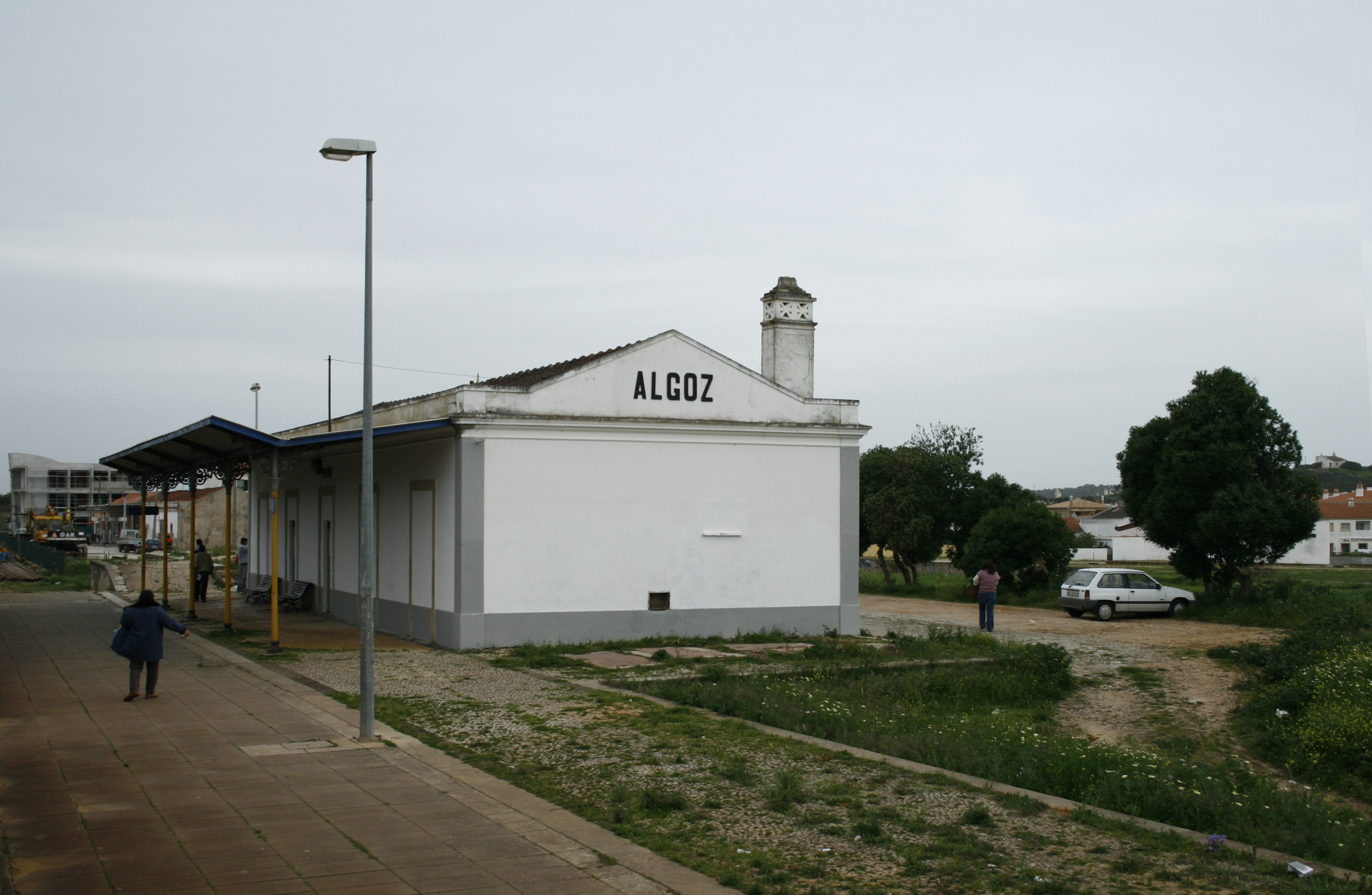
- Algoz halt in 2010

General information
- Location: Silves; Portugal
- Coordinates: 37°10′4.27″N 8°18′11.85″W
- Owner: Infraestruturas de Portugal
- Line: Linha do Algarve
- Platforms: 1
- Train operators: Comboios de Portugal

History
- Opened: 19 October 1899

Services
Preceding station	Comboios de Portugal	Following station
Tunes towards Faro	Regional	Alcantarilha towards Lagos
Location

Algoz, originally spelled Algôs, is a halt on the Algarve Line in Algoz, Silves municipality, Portugal. It was opened on 19 October 1899.

== Services ==
This halt is used by regional trains, operated by Comboios de Portugal.
