= Silves railway station =

Railway station in Portugal

Silves
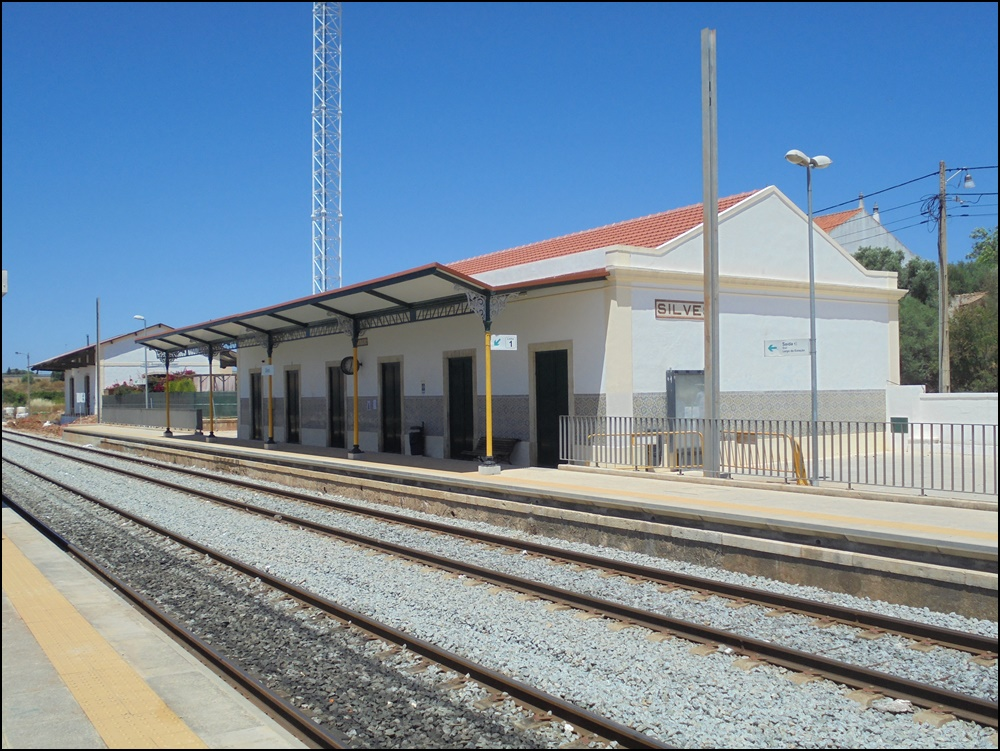
- Silves station in May 2024

General information
- Location: Silves; Portugal
- Coordinates: 37°10′32.34″N 8°26′26.14″W
- Owner: Infraestruturas de Portugal
- Line: Linha do Algarve
- Platforms: 2
- Tracks: Two
- Train operators: Comboios de Portugal

Construction
- Parking: free
- Cycle facilities: free
- Accessible: yes

History
- Opened: 1 February 1902

Services
Preceding station	Comboios de Portugal	Following station
Poço Barreto towards Faro	Regional	Estômbar-Lagoa towards Lagos
Alcantarilha towards Faro	Regional	Estômbar-Lagoa towards Lagos
Location

Silves is a railway station on the Algarve line which serves Silves, Portugal. It opened on 1 February 1902. The station is now without staff. As of May 2024, electrification of the Tunes to Portimão section of the railway is under way, with completion expected by the end of 2024. The station has been modernised in readiness, with high platforms and new lighting.
