= Lagos railway station =

Station in Portugal's Algarve

Lagos
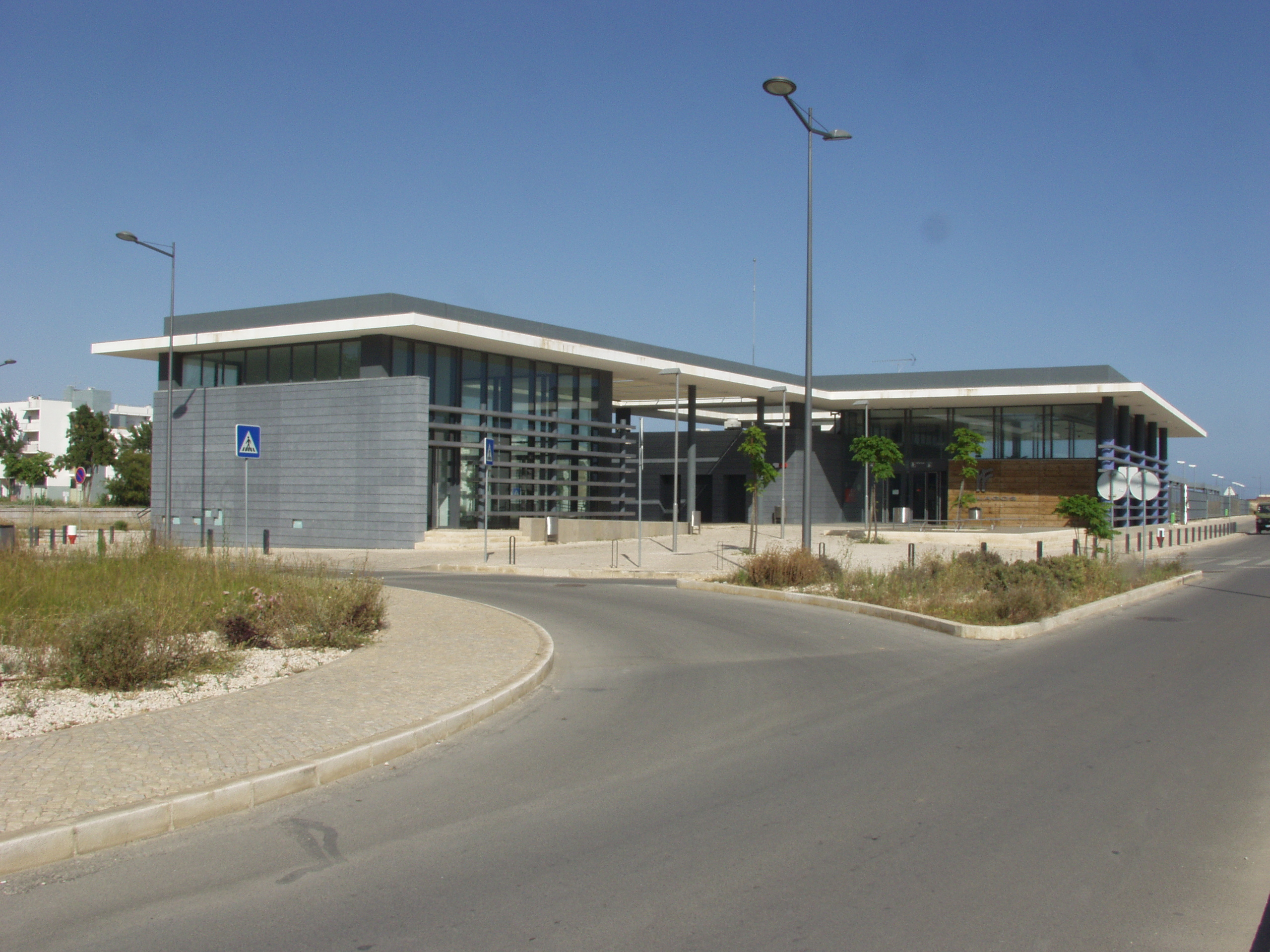
- Lagos station in 2009

General information
- Location: Estrada de São Roque; Estação Ferroviária, 8600-318; Lagos; Portugal
- Coordinates: 37°6′30.73″N 8°40′18.02″W
- Owner: Infraestruturas de Portugal
- Line: Linha do Algarve
- Platforms: 3
- Train operators: Comboios de Portugal

Other information
- Website: Lagos station on IP's website

History
- Opened: 30 July 1922

Services
Preceding station	Comboios de Portugal	Following station
Meia Praia towards Faro	Regional	Lagos Terminus
Mexilhoeira Grande towards Faro	Regional	Lagos Terminus
Location

The Lagos railway station is the western terminus of the Algarve line, which serves the city of Lagos, in the Faro District, in Portugal. It opened on the 7th of July 1922. The building was replaced by a new structure in 2003.
