= Faro railway station =

Railway station in Portugal

Faro
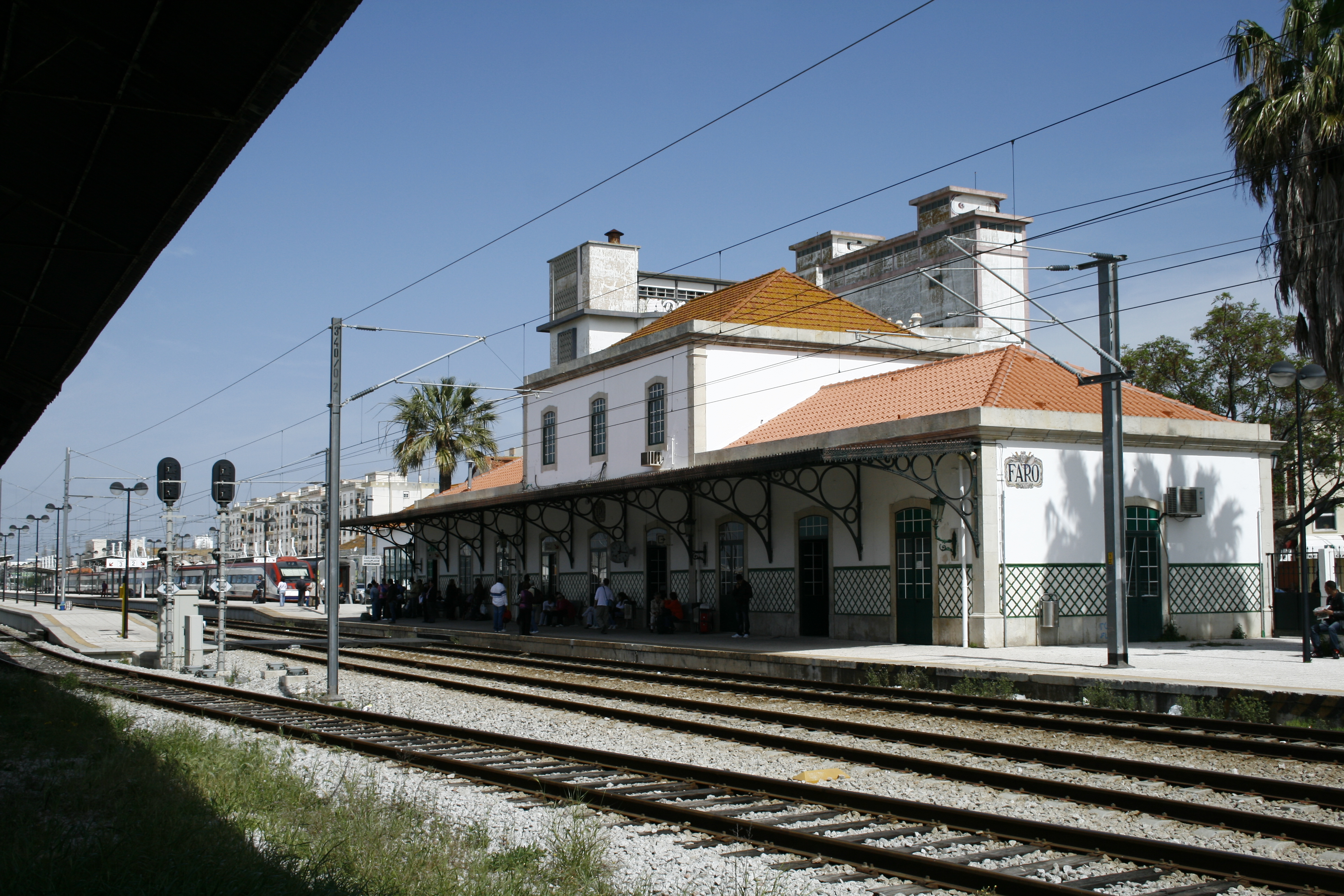
- The station in April 2010

General information
- Location: Largo da Estação dos Caminhos de Ferro, Faro; Portugal
- Coordinates: 37.018508°N 7.939677°W
- Operator: Comboios de Portugal
- Line: Linha do Algarve
- Platforms: 6

Construction
- Platform levels: 1

History
- Opened: 1 July 1889

Services
Preceding station	Comboios de Portugal	Following station
Terminus	Alfa Pendular	Loulé towards Porto-Campanhã
Terminus	Intercidades	Loulé towards Lisbon-Oriente
Terminus	Regional	Parque das Cidades towards Lagos
Bom João towards Vila Real de Santo António	Regional	Terminus
Location

Faro station (Portuguese: Estação de Faro) is the main railway station in the city of Faro, Portugal, on the Algarve line (Linha do Algarve), serving the city of Faro in the Faro District of Portugal. It is operated by Comboios de Portugal. It opened on 1 July 1889.

The station complex consists of eight main tracks (designated I through VIII) with usable lengths between 135 and 388 metres. All track lines are fully electrified (25 kV ~ 50 Hz) except for track III. Tracks I to VI feature passenger platforms ranging from 194 to 328 metres in length with a uniform height of 90 cm. There are also six secondary/auxiliary tracks (G1, G2, G3, G5, G7, and G9), with G1 and G2 being fully electrified.

The passenger station building is situated on the northeast side of the tracks (on the left side in the ascending direction towards Vila Real de Santo António).

Faro serves as a major operational transition point on the network :

- To the west (descending towards Tunes/Lisbon): Track allows maximum train lengths of 395 m, running on full electrification.
- To the east (ascending towards Vila Real de Santo António): The track profile transitions with a restricted loading gauge and a maximum train length limit of 200 m.

The line to the north-west is electrified, using overhead catenary. The line east, to the terminus at Vila Real de Santo António, has also been electrified using 25 kV AC overhead catenary, enabling electric train operations along the entire section between Faro and Vila Real de Santo António.

In 1999, following the creation of a rail crossing over the River Tagus at Lisbon, the Alfa Pendular high speed electric tilting train service was introduced on the Braga-Porto-Lisbon-Faro line, with through trains south of Lisbon starting in 2003.

Passenger Services

Faro is a major terminus for long-distance passenger services operated by CP (Comboios de Portugal):

- Alfa Pendular: High-speed trains connecting Faro directly to Porto-Campanhã.
- Intercidades: Express services linking Faro with Lisbon (Santa Apolónia / Oriente).
- Regional Services: Local train connections running along the Algarve line westward to Lagos and eastward to Vila Real de Santo António.

Although Seville is less than 200 km (120 mi) away, Faro does not have any railway connection crossing the border to Spain.
