= Linha do Algarve =

Railway line in Portugal

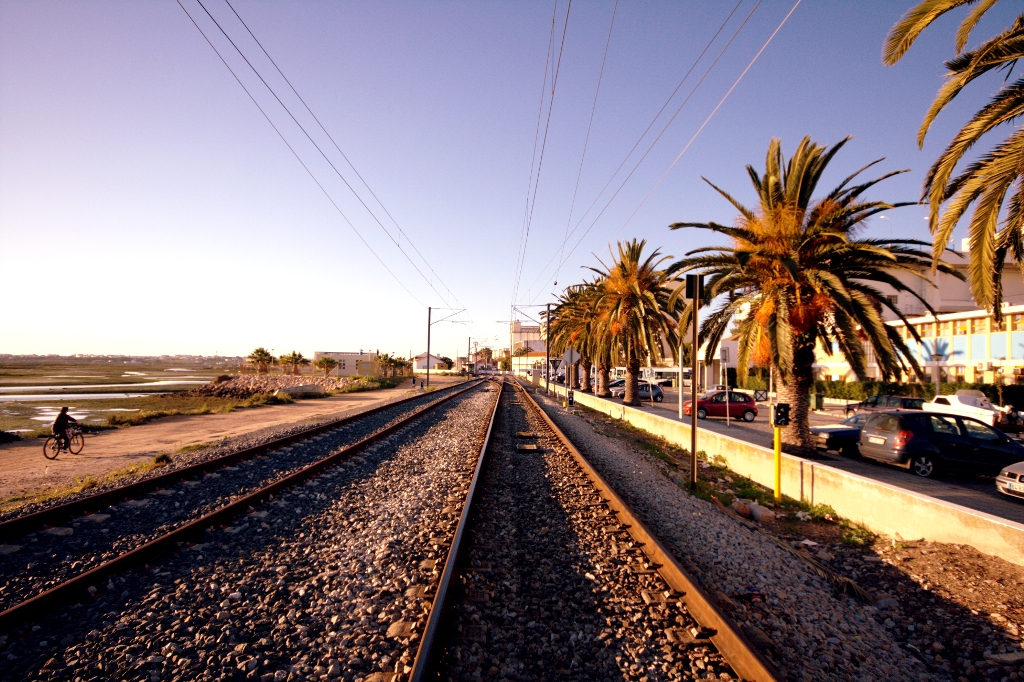
- Linha do Algarve in Faro.

Overview
- Status: Operational
- Owner: Infraestruturas de Portugal
- Locale: Faro District
- Termini: Lagos; Vila Real de Santo António

Service
- Type: Regional rail, High-speed rail
- Operator: Comboios de Portugal
- Rolling stock: CP 0450; CP 4000; CP 4700; CP 5600

Technical
- Line length: 139.5 km (86.7 mi)
- Number of tracks: One
- Track gauge: 1,668 mm (5 ft 5 21/32 in) Iberian gauge
- Electrification: 25 kV / 50 kHz Overhead line: (Tunes to Faro)
- Operating speed: Maximum 160 km/h (99 mph)
- Signalling: Interposed Automatic Block
- Train protection system: Automatic train control
Route map
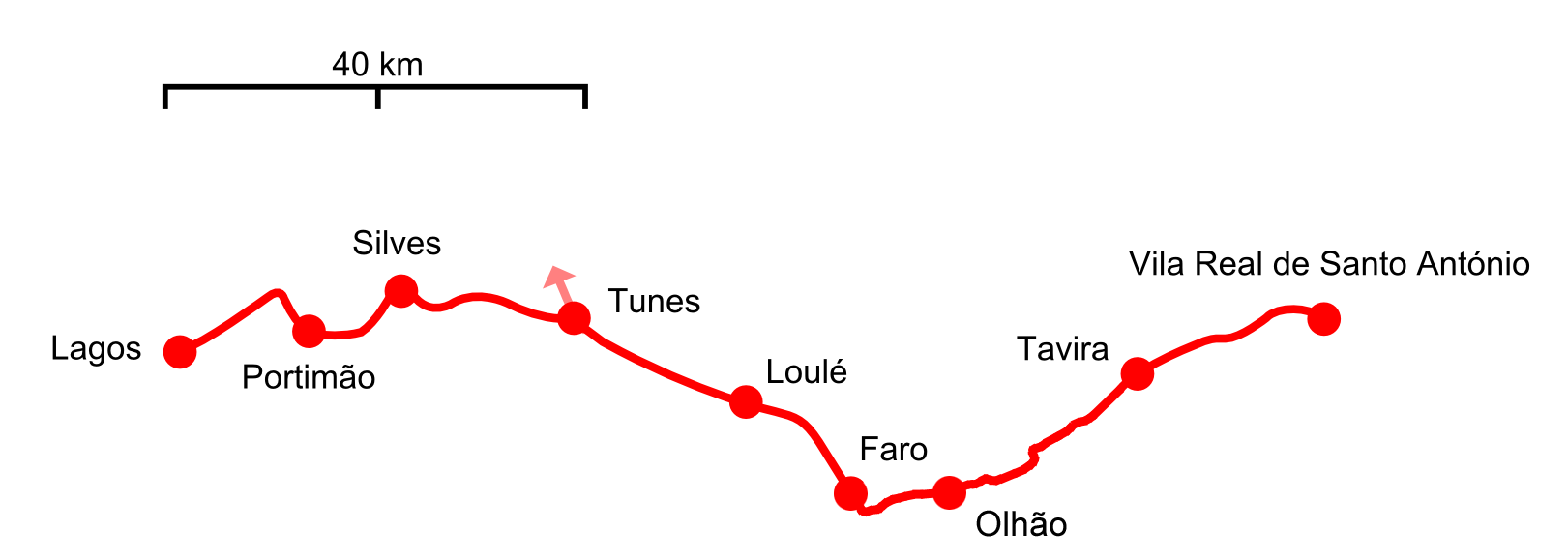

Location on the network
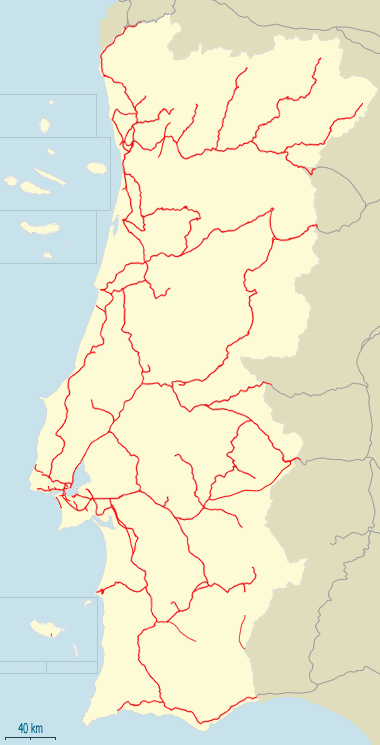

+ Lagos × VRSA (🔎)

Linha do Algarve is a railway line in the region of Algarve, in southern Portugal, which connects the stations of Lagos to the west and Vila Real de Santo António to the east of the Portuguese region.

== Geography ==
The line runs east to west along the southern municipalities of the Algarve, except for part of Lagos municipality and all of Vila do Bispo municipality which doesn't have railway. The main stations are Vila Real de Santo António, Tavira, Olhão, Faro, Albufeira, Tunes, Silves, Portimão and Lagos. Other stations include Fuseta, Bom João (Faro), Almancil, Algoz and Estômbar.

== Operation ==
=== Passengers and cargo ===
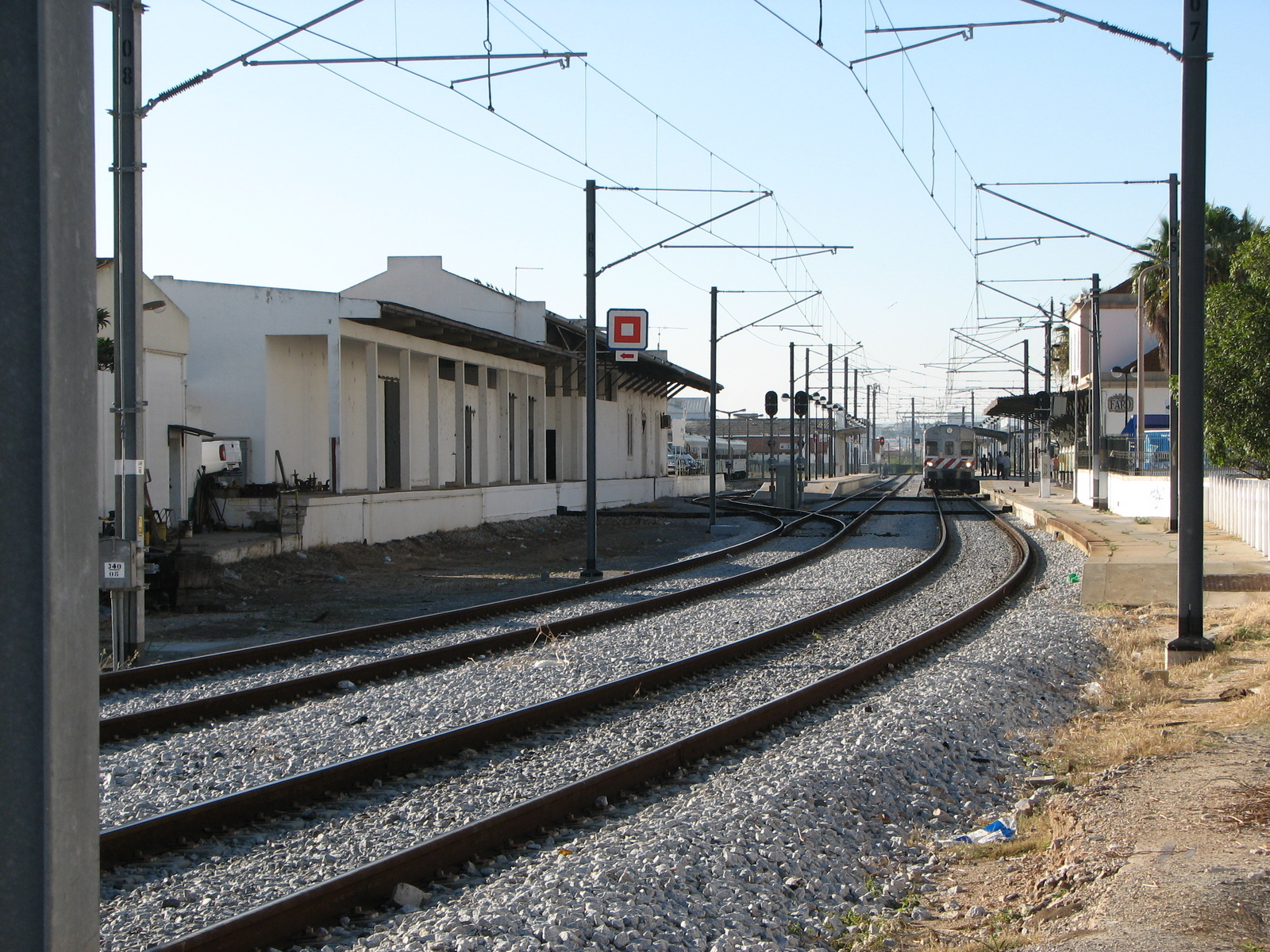
Faro railway station.

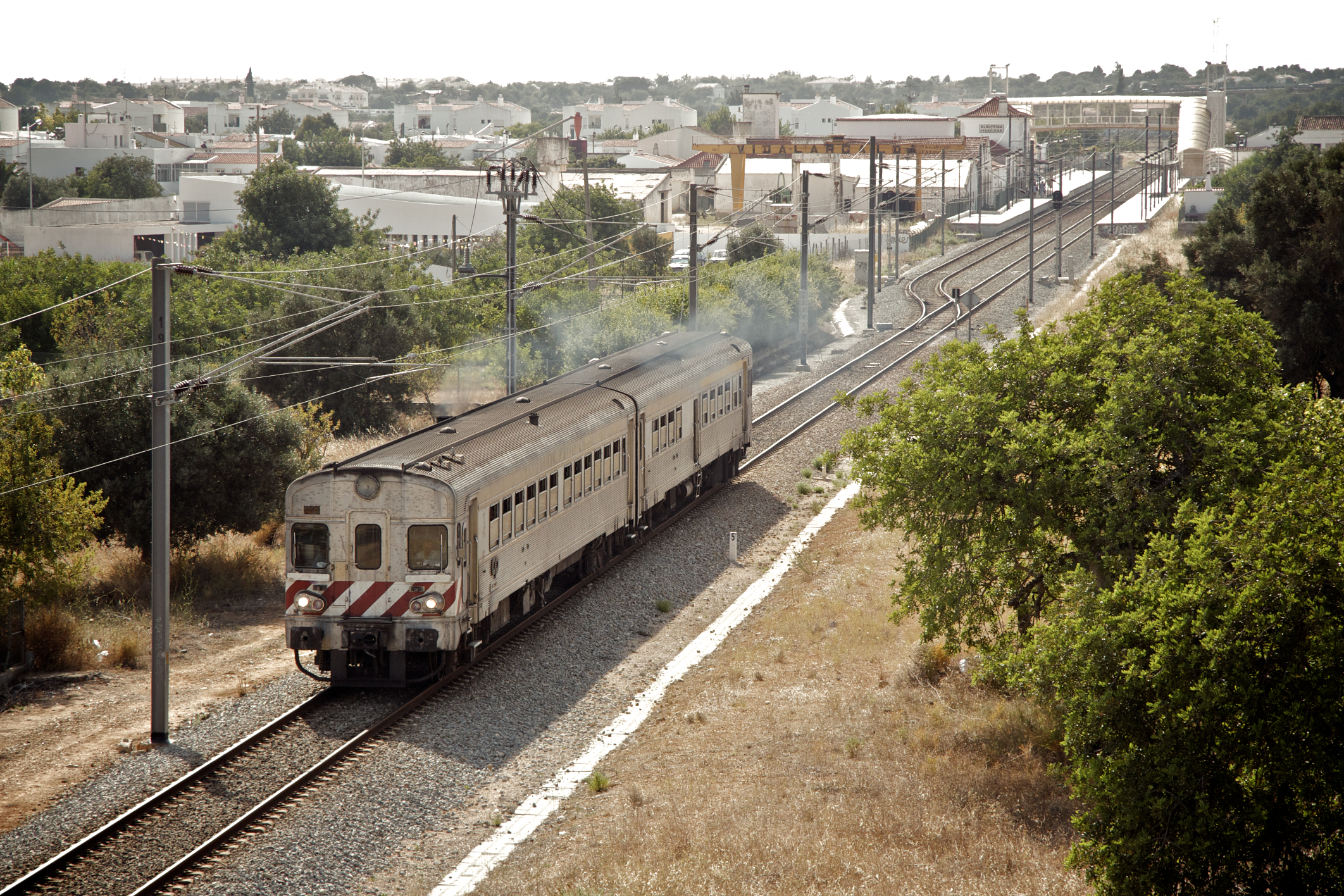
CP Class 0600 train, approaching Albufeira-Ferreiras, in 2011. This type of train is no longer used.

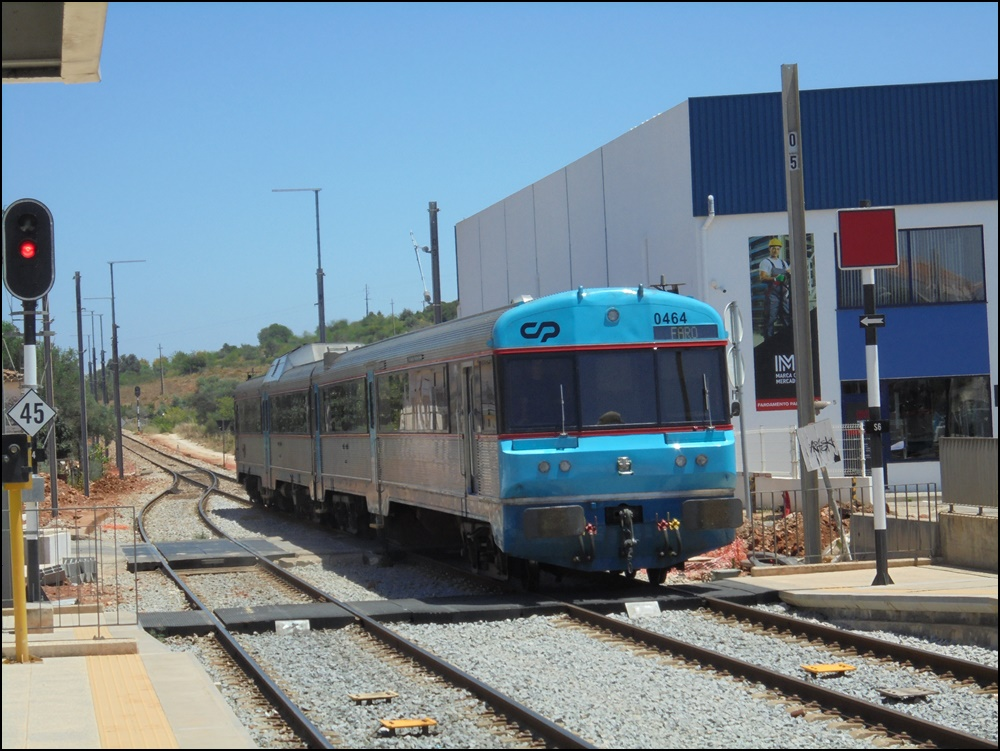
CP Regional train at Silves May 2024.jpg

All passenger services are run by the national railway operator Comboios de Portugal. Cargo services are operated by Medway. The infrastructure is owned and maintained by Infraestruturas de Portugal. The main railway station is Faro, the most important cargo terminal is Loulé.

Four passenger services operate on the Linha do Algarve. The Alfa Pendular, Intercidades, CP Regional, and a special service during the summer, the InterRegional. The CP Regional trains operate the line completely from east to west with an interchange at Faro. The Alfa Pendular, Intercidades and InterRegional only serve Messines-Alte, Tunes, Albufeira, Loulé, and Faro.

The track from Vila Real de Santo António to Vila Real de Santo António - Guadiana, which linked the line to the ferries to Ayamonte, in Spain, has been removed.

== History ==
In 1858, the expansion of the Linha do Sul, today Linha do Alentejo, from Beja to Algarve was planned; in 1864, the contract between Companhia dos Caminhos de Ferro de Sul e Sueste and the Portuguese state was signed.

The connection to Faro was completed on 21 February 1889, but only opened on 1 July of the same year.

The railway reached Olhão on 28 March 1904 (although the station was only opened on 15 May of that year), Fuseta railway station on 1 September, Luz on 31 January 1905, Tavira on 19 March, and Vila Real de Santo António on 14 April 1906. Towards Lagos, the stations of Algoz, Ferragudo and Lagos were opened on 10 October 1889, 15 February 1903 and 30 July 1922. The Vila Real de Santo António – Guadiana station was opened in the 1940's and closed in 1998. Trains now finish their journey at the 'town' station some 1km short of the river and ferry.

Work began in late 2022 on a project to modernise and electify the Faro to Vila Real de Santo António and Tunes to Lagos sections. As of summer 2026 electrified trains were fully operational between Faro and Vila Real de Santo António. The Tunes to Lagos section is several months behind, having started later. The smaller stations are being equipped with modern high platforms, along with new shelters and lighting. Several level (Grade) crossings are to be eliminated by the construction of bridges.

== See also ==
- List of railway lines in Portugal
- List of Portuguese locomotives and railcars
- History of rail transport in Portugal

== Bibliography ==
- Cabrita, Aurélio Nuno (2014). O comboio no Algarve: festejos e inaugurações. Lisboa e Portimão: Casa do Algarve e Centro de Arte e Cultura Teixeira Gomes. ISBN 978-989-96133-3-1.
- Marques, Maria da Graça Maia (1999). O Algarve Da Antiguidade aos Nossos Dias. Lisboa: Edições Colibri. ISBN 972-772-064-1.
- Santos, Luís Filipe Rosa (1995). Os Acessos a Faro e aos Concelhos Limítrofes na Segunda Metade do Séc. XIX. Faro: Câmara Municipal. ISBN 972-772-064-1.
- Santos, Luís Filipe Rosa (1997). Faro: um Olhar sobre o Passado Recente. Faro: Câmara Municipal. ISBN 972-772-064-1.
