= Ramal do Pego =

Portuguese railway line

Overview
- Termini: Mouriscas-A; Pego Power Station

Technical
- Line length: 6.7 km (4.2 mi)
- Track gauge: 1,668 mm (5 ft 5 21/32 in) Iberian gauge
Route map
Location on the network

Ramal do Pego is a railway branch in Portugal, which connects the station of Mouriscas-A, on the Linha da Beira Baixa, to the Pego Power Station.

== See also ==
- List of railway lines in Portugal
- History of rail transport in Portugal
