= List of railway stations in Portugal =

List of railway stations located in Portugal

These places are served by Comboios de Portugal or Fertagus, the main railway operators of Portugal.

== A ==
- Abrantes
- Adémia
- Afife
- Agualva-Cacém
- Aguda
- Aguim
- Albergaria dos Doze
- Albufeira-Ferreiras
- Alcaçovas
- Alcaide
- Alcains
- Alcântara-Mar
- Alcântara-Terra
- Alcaria
- Aldeia
- Alegria
- Alfarelos
- Alferrarede
- Algés
- Algoz
- Algueirão
- Alhandra
- Alhos Vedros
- Almourol
- Alpedrinha
- Alvarães
- Alvega-Ortiga
- Alverca
- Alvito
- Amadora
- Ameal
- Aregos
- Areia-Darque
- Arentim
- Areosa
- Arronches
- Assumar
- Avanca
- Aveiro
- Aveleda
- Azambuja

== B ==
- Baixa da Banheira
- Baraçal
- Barca da Amieira-Envendos
- Barcelos
- Barqueiros
- Barquinha
- Barragem de Belver
- Barreiro
- Barreiro-A
- Barrimau
- Barroselas
- Beja
- Belém
- Belver-Gavião
- Bemposta
- Bencanta
- Benfica
- Benquerenças
- Bobadela
- Boliqueime
- Bombarral
- Braço de Prata
- Braga
- Bustelo

== C ==
- Cabeda
- Cacela
- Cacia
- Caíde
- Cais do Sodré
- Caldas da Rainha
- Caldas de Moledo
- Caminha
- Campolide
- Canas-Felgueira
- Canelas
- Caniços
- Carapeços
- Carcavelos
- Carrascal-Delongo
- Carreço
- Carregado
- Carregal do Sal
- Carreira
- Carvalha
- Carvalheira-Maceda
- Carvalhos de Figueiredo
- Casa Branca
- Casais
- Cascais
- Castanheira do Ribatejo
- Castelejo
- Castelo Branco
- Castelo Novo
- Caxarias
- Caxias
- Celorico da Beira
- Cerdeira
- Cête
- Chança
- Coimbra
- Coimbra-B
- Coimbrões
- Coina
- Contumil
- Corroios
- Cortegaça
- Couto de Cambeses
- Covas
- Covelinhas
- Covilhã
- Crato
- Cruz Quebrada
- Cuba
- Cuca
- Curia
- Curvaceiras

== D ==
- Darque
- Donas
- Durrães

== E ==
- Elvas
- Entrecampos
- Entroncamento
- Ermesinde
- Ermida
- Ermidas Sado
- Esmeriz
- Esmoriz
- Espadanal da Azambuja
- Espadaneira
- Espinho
- Esqueiro
- Estarreja
- Estoril

== F ==
- Famalicão
- Faro
- Fatela-Penamacor
- Fátima
- Fernando Pó
- Ferradosa
- Ferrão
- Ferreiros
- Figueira da Foz
- Fogueteiro
- Formoselha
- Fornos de Algodres
- Foros de Amora
- Francelos
- Fratel
- Freineda
- Freixo de Numão
- Funcheira
- Fundão
- Fungalvaz
- Fuseta-A

== G ==
- Gata
- General Torres
- Giesteira
- Godim
- Gondarém
- Gouveia
- Grândola
- Granja
- Guarda
- Guimarães

== I ==
- Irivo

== J ==
- Juncal

== L ==
- Lagos
- Lamarosa
- Lapa do Lobo
- Lardosa
- Lavradio
- Leandro
- Leiria
- Lisboa Oriente
- Lisboa Santa Apolónia
- Litém
- Livração
- Lordelo
- Loulé
- Louro
- Lousado
- Luso - Buçaco

== M ==
- Madalena
- Mangualde
- Marco de Canaveses
- Marvila
- Massamá-Barcarena
- Mato de Miranda
- Mazagão
- Mealhada
- Meia-Praia
- Meinedo
- Mercês
- Midões
- Mira Sintra-Meleças
- Miramar
- Mirão
- Miuzela
- Mogofores
- Moimenta-Alcafache
- Moita
- Moledo do Minho
- Monte Abraão
- Monte de Lobos
- Monte Estoril
- Monte Gordo
- Mortágua
- Moscavide
- Mosteirô
- Mouquim
- Mouriscas-A

== N ==
- Nelas
- Nespereira
- Nine

== O ==
- Oeiras
- Oiã
- Oleiros
- Olhão
- Oliveira
- Oliveira do Bairro
- Oliveirinha-Cabanas
- Ovar

== P ==
- Paço de Arcos
- Paialvo
- Pala
- Palmela
- Pampilhosa
- Papízios
- Parada
- Paraimo-Sangalhos
- Paramos
- Parede
- Paredes
- Pegões
- Pelariga
- Penafiel
- Penalva
- Penteado
- Pereira
- Pereirinhas
- Pinhal Novo
- Pinhão railway station
- Poceirão
- Pocinho
- Pombal
- Ponte de Sor
- Porta Nova
- Portalegre
- Portela
- Portela de Sintra
- Portimão
- Porto Campanhã
- Porto Rei
- Porto São Bento
- Póvoa
- Praça do Quebedo
- Pragal
- Praia do Ribatejo
- Praias do Sado

== Q ==
- Queluz-Belas
- Quintans

== R ==
- Reboleira
- Recarei-Sobreira
- Recesinhos
- Rede
- Régua
- Reguengo - Vale da Pedra - Pontevel
- Retaxo
- Riachos - Torres Novas - Golegã
- Rio de Mouro
- Rio Tinto
- Rochoso
- Rodão
- Roma-Areeiro
- Rossio
- Ruílhe

== S ==
- Sacavém
- Salreu
- Santa Cita
- Santa Comba Dão
- Santa Cruz Damaia
- Santa Eulália-A
- Santa Iria
- Santa Margarida
- Santana-Cartaxo
- Santarém
- Santo Amaro de Oeiras
- Santo Tirso
- Santos
- São Frutuoso
- São João das Craveiras
- São João do Estoril
- São Martinho do Campo
- São Pedro da Torre
- São Pedro do Estoril
- São Romão
- Sarnadas
- Seiça-Ourém
- Seixas
- Senhora da Agonia
- Senhora das Neves
- Sete Rios
- Setil
- Setúbal
- Silva
- Silvalde
- Silves
- Simões
- Sintra
- Soalheira
- Soito
- Soudos - Vila Nova
- Soure
- Souselas
- Suzão

== T ==
- Tadim
- Tamel
- Tancos
- Taveiro
- Tavira
- Terronhas
- Tojeirinha
- Tomar
- Torre das Vargens
- Torres Vedras
- Tortosendo
- Tramagal
- Trancoso
- Travagem
- Trofa
- Tua
- Tunes

== V ==
- Vacariça
- Valadares
- Valado
- Vale de Figueira
- Vale de Prazeres
- Vale de Santarém
- Válega
- Valença
- Valongo
- Vargelas
- Venda do Alcaide
- Vendas Novas
- Vermoil
- Verride
- Vesúvio
- Viana do Castelo
- Vila das Aves
- Vila Fernando
- Vila Franca das Naves
- Vila Franca de Xira
- Vila Meã
- Vila Nova da Baronia
- Vila Nova da Rainha
- Vila Nova de Anços
- Vila Nova de Cerveira
- Vila Nova de Gaia - Devesas
- Vila Pouca do Campo
- Vila Real de Santo António
- Vilar Formoso
- Vilela-Fornos
- Virtudes
- Vizela

== Á ==
- Águas Santas / Palmilheira

== Â ==
- Âncora-Praia

== É ==
- Évora
