= CP Class 0350 =

Série 0350
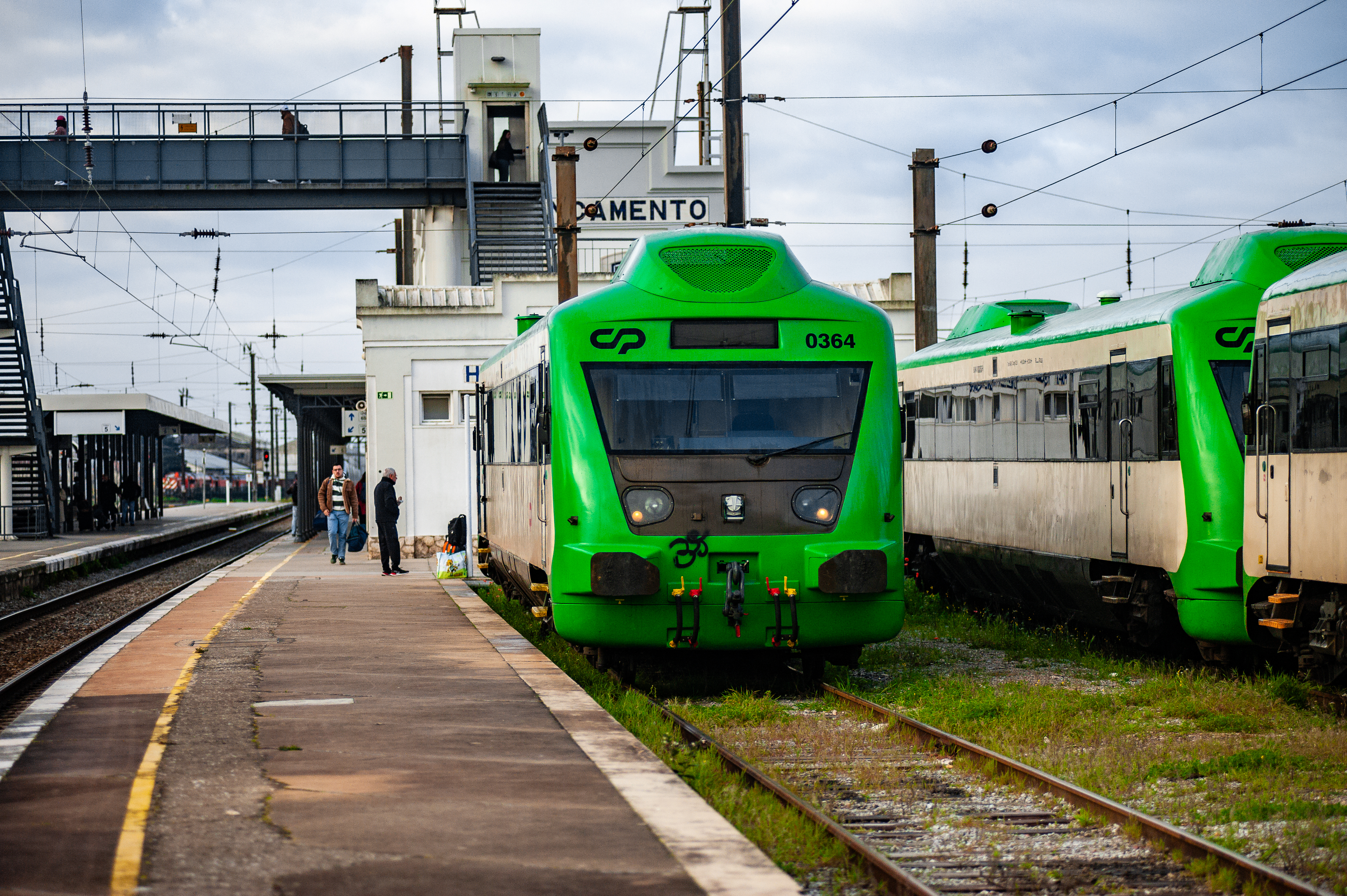
- Série 0350 railcar (number 0364) at Entroncamento station, 2025
- Stock type: Diesel Multiple Unit
- In service: 1954 - present
- Manufacturer: Allan of Rotterdam
- Built at: Rotterdam, Netherlands (original); Guifões, Portugal (refurbishment)
- Constructed: 1954-55
- Entered service: 1954
- Refurbished: 2000–2003
- Number built: 21
- Number in service: 6
- Fleet numbers: 0351–0371
- Capacity: 179
- Operator: Comboios de Portugal
- Lines served: Beira Baixa; Figueira da Foz; Lousã; Oeste; Leste; Cáceres

Specifications
- Train length: 23,630 mm (77 ft 6 3/8 in)
- Car length: 23,630 mm (77 ft 6 3/8 in)
- Width: 3,400 mm (11 ft 1 7/8 in)
- Height: 4,230 mm (13 ft 10 1/2 in)
- Floor height: 1,070 mm (3 ft 6 1/8 in)
- Doors: Electro-pneumatic coach doors, 2 each side
- Wheel diameter: 920 mm (36.22 in)
- Maximum speed: 100 km/h (62 mph)
- Prime movers: 2 x Société Surgèrienne de Construction Mécanique; Poyaud C6150T
- Engine type: (?)
- Cylinder count: 6
- Power output: 220 CV (162 kW; 217 hp)
- Transmission: Electric
- HVAC: Air conditioning
- Braking system: Electro-pneumatic
- Track gauge: 1,668 mm (5 ft 5 21/32 in)

The Série 0350 are a type of single carriage diesel railcar used by Portuguese Railways (CP). They were built by Allan of Rotterdam in the Netherlands in 1954-55 (as Série 0300). In 2000 they were extensively modernised and reclassified as Série 0350. The distinctive roof pod above the driver's compartment houses heat dissipators for rheostatic braking.

Many of the lines used by these units have been closed in recent years, notably the Figueira da Foz and Lousã branches. In August 2017 CP restarted a one-per-day return passenger service on the Linha do Leste between Entroncamento and Badajoz (Spain) using a 0350 railcar.

Allan also built a metre gauge version of its diesel railcars for CP, which were classified Série 9300.

== See also ==
- Automotora VIP
