= Queluz-Belas railway station =

Railway station in Queluz, Portugal

Queluz-Belas
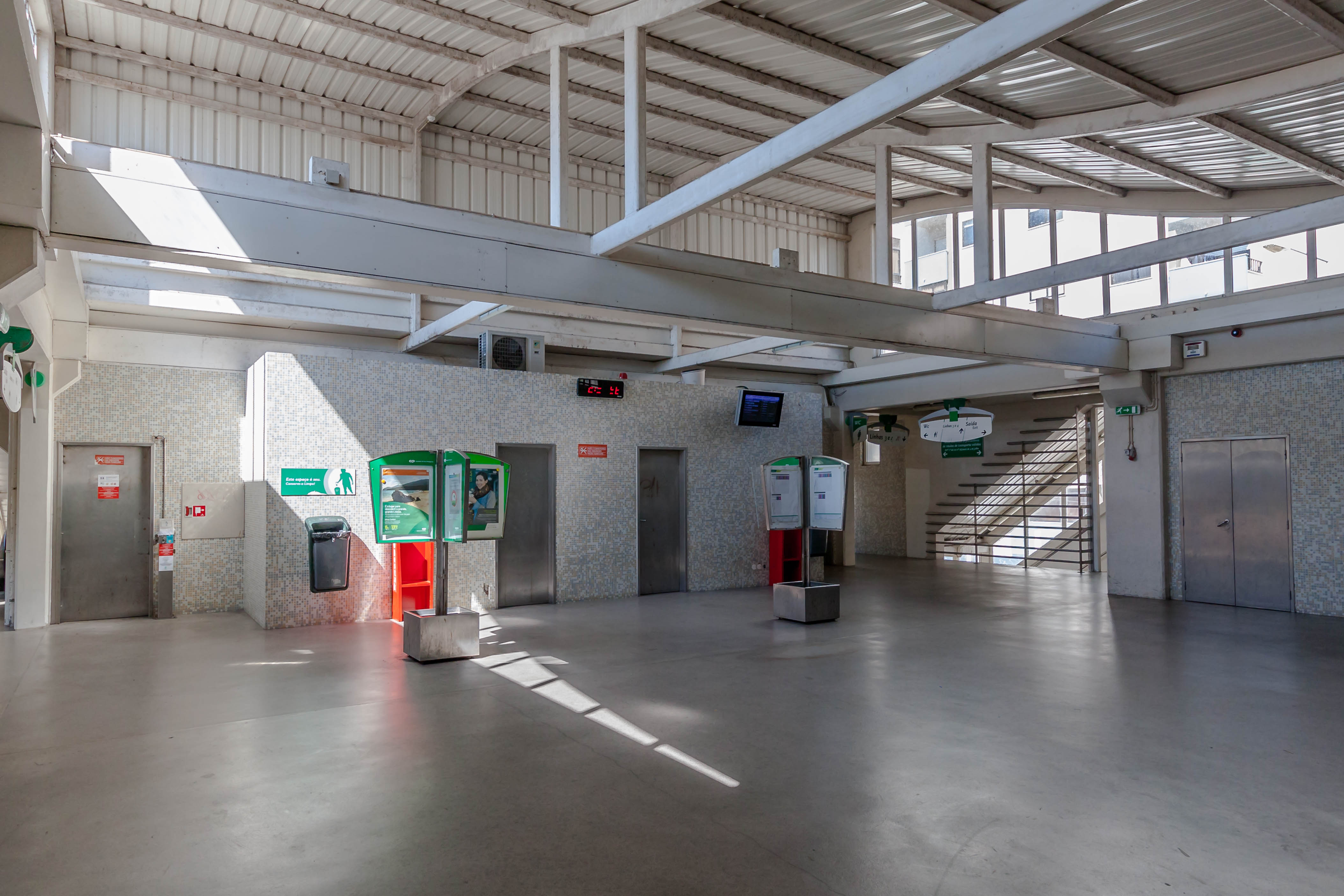
- The main atrium of Queluz-Belas Station, March 2020

General information
- Location: Av. António Enes, 2745, Queluz; Portugal
- Coordinates: 38°45′31.32″N 9°15′24.16″W
- Operator: Lisbon CP
- Manager: Infraestruturas de Portugal
- Line: Sintra Line
- Distance: 12.1 km from Rossio
- Platforms: 2 island platforms
- Tracks: 4

Construction
- Structure type: Ground-level
- Accessible: Yes

History
- Opened: 2 April 1887

Services
| Preceding station | Lisbon CP | Following station |
|---|---|---|
| Monte Abraão towards Sintra | Sintra Line | Amadora towards Rossio |
| Monte Abraão towards Sintra | Sintra Line | Amadora towards Oriente |
| Monte Abraão towards Sintra | Sintra Line | Amadora towards Alverca |
| Monte Abraão towards Mira Sintra-Meleças | Sintra Line | Amadora towards Rossio |
Location

Queluz-Belas Station (Portuguese: Estação Ferroviária de Queluz-Belas) is a railway station located in the city of Queluz, Portugal. It is served by the Sintra and Azambuja Lines. It is operated by Lisbon CP and managed by Infraestruturas de Portugal.

== Service ==
Trains stop at Queluz-Belas Station at approximately 15-minute intervals on weekends and off-peak periods on weekdays. During peak periods, trains stop at Queluz-Belas Station at approximately 5-minute intervals, with some trains arriving within a minute of each other.

== Station layout ==
Queluz-Belas Station is located on ground-level. It has exits on the north and south sides, with a bus loop located on the north side.

=== Platforms ===
Queluz-Belas Station is composed of two island platforms serving four tracks.

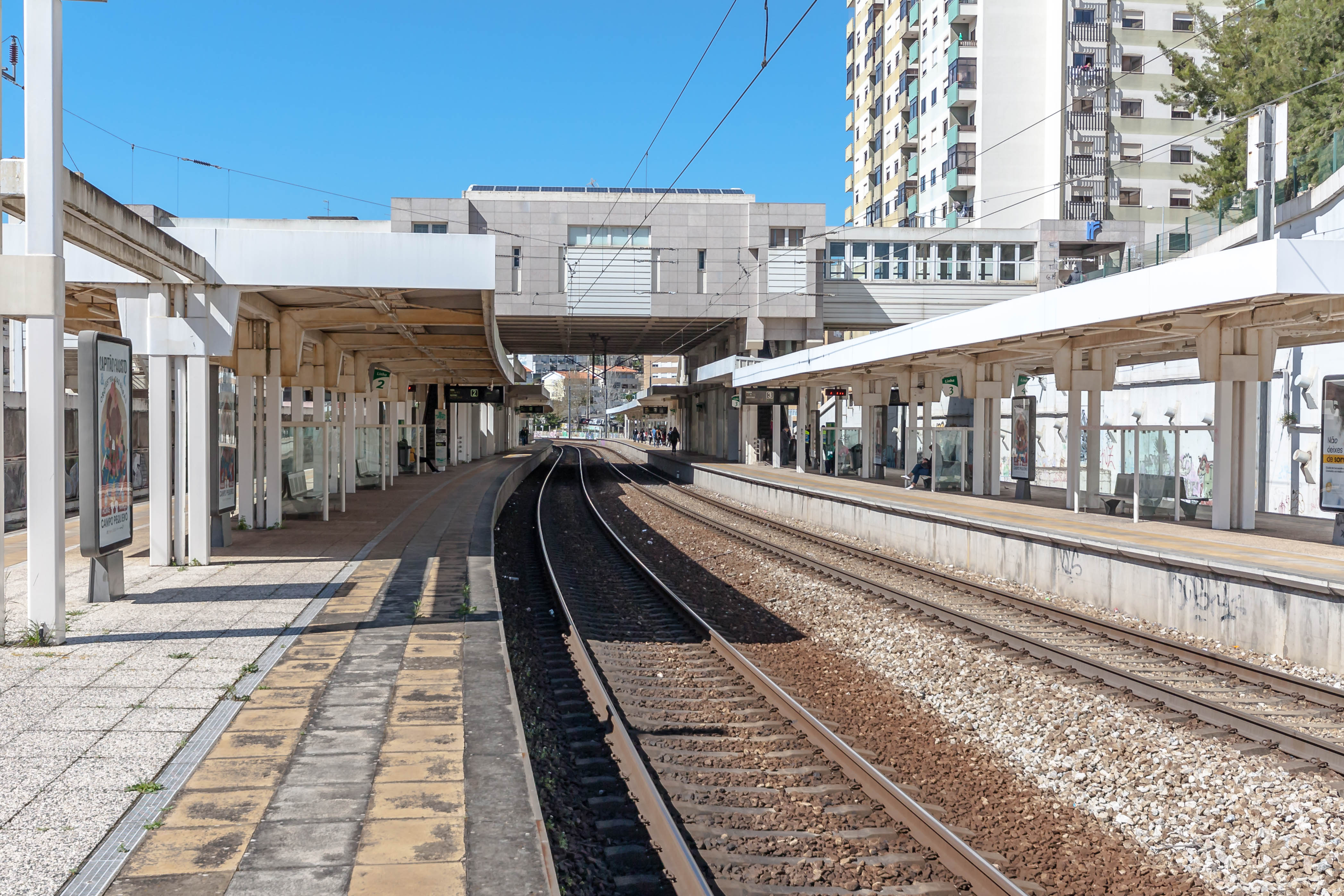
The station platforms, March 2020

== History ==
Queluz-Belas Station opened on 2 April 1887, originally on the Sintra Line between Alcântara-Terra and Sintra. The southern terminus of the line was shifted to Rossio following that station's completion on 11 June 1890. The renovation of the station was completed in June 2002, which involved introducing quadruple trackage to the station, as well as building pedestrian tunnels and better road connections. On 4 August 2017, four new escalators were installed at this station.

A fight broke out in the station on 13 July 2019, leading to a temporary closure of the station. Over 100 people were involved in the fight.

== Surrounding area ==
- Felicio Loureiro Urban Park
- Palace of Queluz
- Rio Jamor
