= Cais do Sodré =

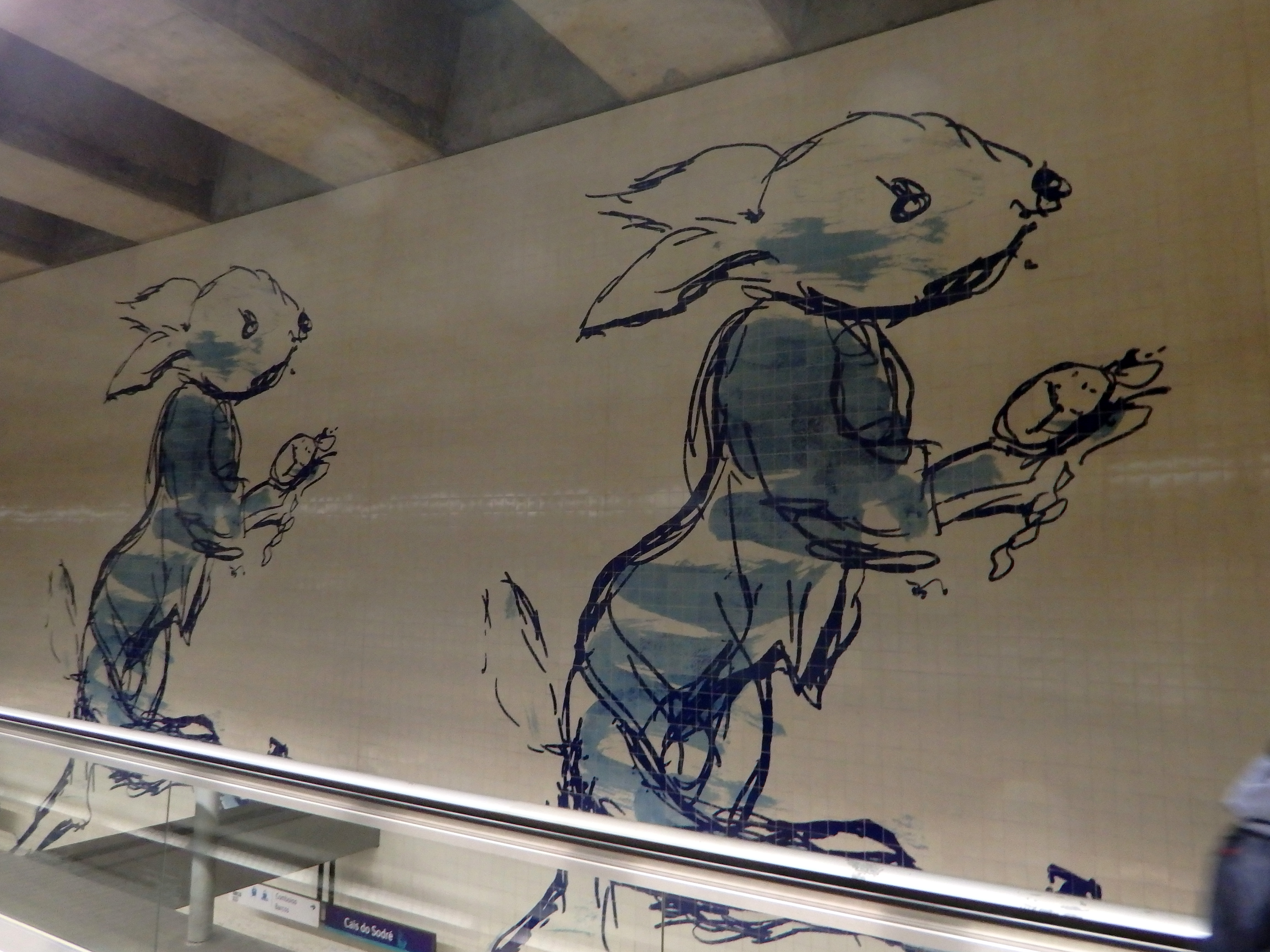
Cais do Sodré metro station, Lisbon, Portugal

Cais do Sodré is an area in the center of Lisbon, Portugal, between Cais da Marinha and Cais do Gás. This name is shared by two railway stations and a ferry station in Lisbon, Portugal:

- Cais do Sodré railway station
- Cais do Sodré (Lisbon Metro)
- Cais do Sodré, ferry station (allowing for quick travel between Lisbon and Cacilhas, Seixal and Montijo)

== History ==
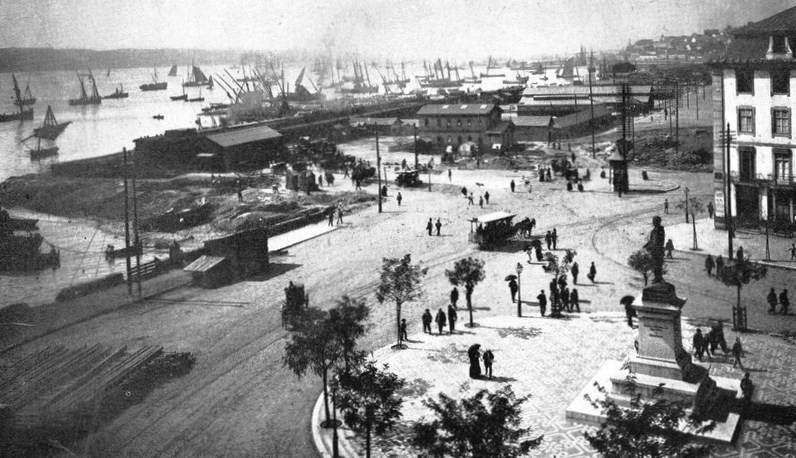
Cais do Sodré

Cais do Sodré was known at the beginning of the 19th century as Bairro dos Remolares.

From 1855 onwards, several works were carried out to transform this unhealthy place into a landmark in the city of Lisbon at the time. Warehouses were built, fishing sailors began to live in the neighborhood, entrepreneurs linked to the import and export industry opened businesses in the neighborhood. Everyone benefitted from the proximity of the port and international commercial connections.

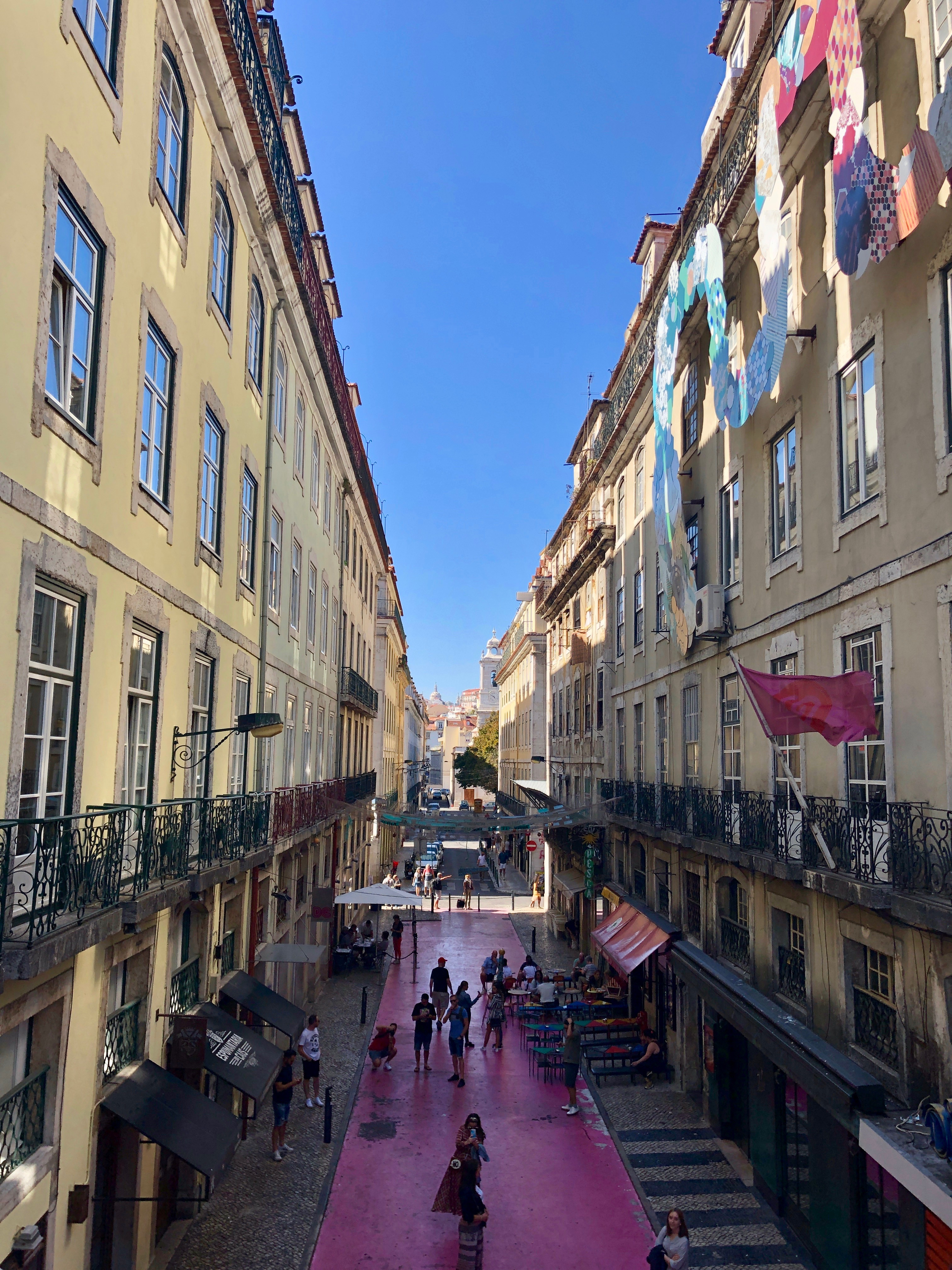
Rua Nova do Carvalho (Pink street)

With the arrival of these groups, Cais do Sodré was already a social reference at the end of the 19th century. It was a stage for intellectuals, bourgeoisie, dandies, artists and upper class individuals, especially at the Hotel Central, described by Eça de Queirós in his work Os Maias.

By 2019 it was a historic and vibrant neighborhood, becoming one of the liveliest and busiest places in Lisbon. It is famous for its nightlife, especially on Pink street (Rua Nova do Carvalho), with several entertainment options, from bars, restaurants and nightclubs.
