= Ramal de Alfarelos =

Portuguese railway line

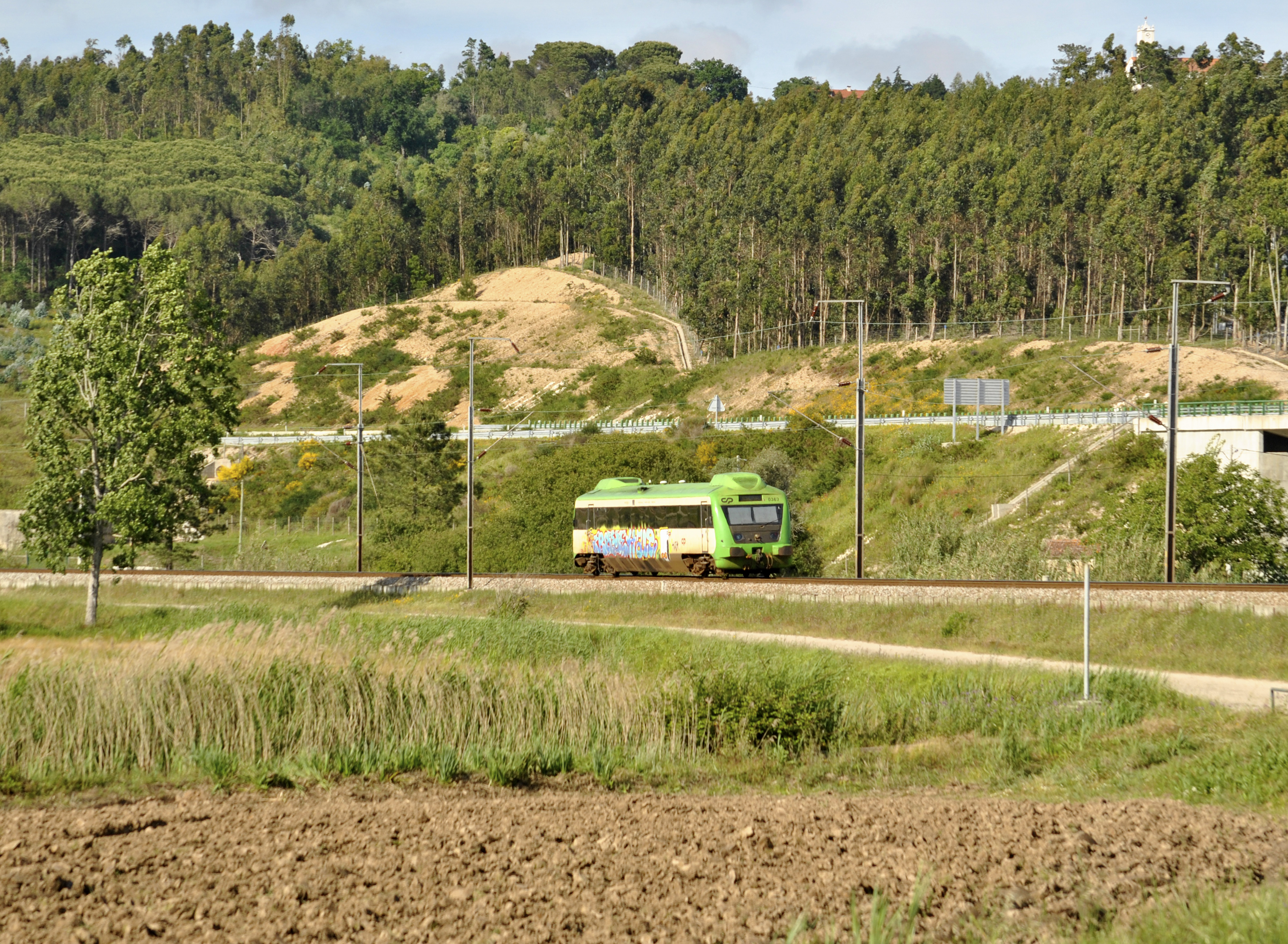
- CP 0362 close to Reveles.

Overview
- Status: Operational
- Owner: Infraestruturas de Portugal
- Termini: Alfarelos; Bifurcação de Lares

Service
- Operator(s): Comboios de Portugal

Technical
- Line length: 16.5 km (10.3 mi)
- Track gauge: Iberian
- Electrification: 25 kV / 50 kHz Overhead line
Route map
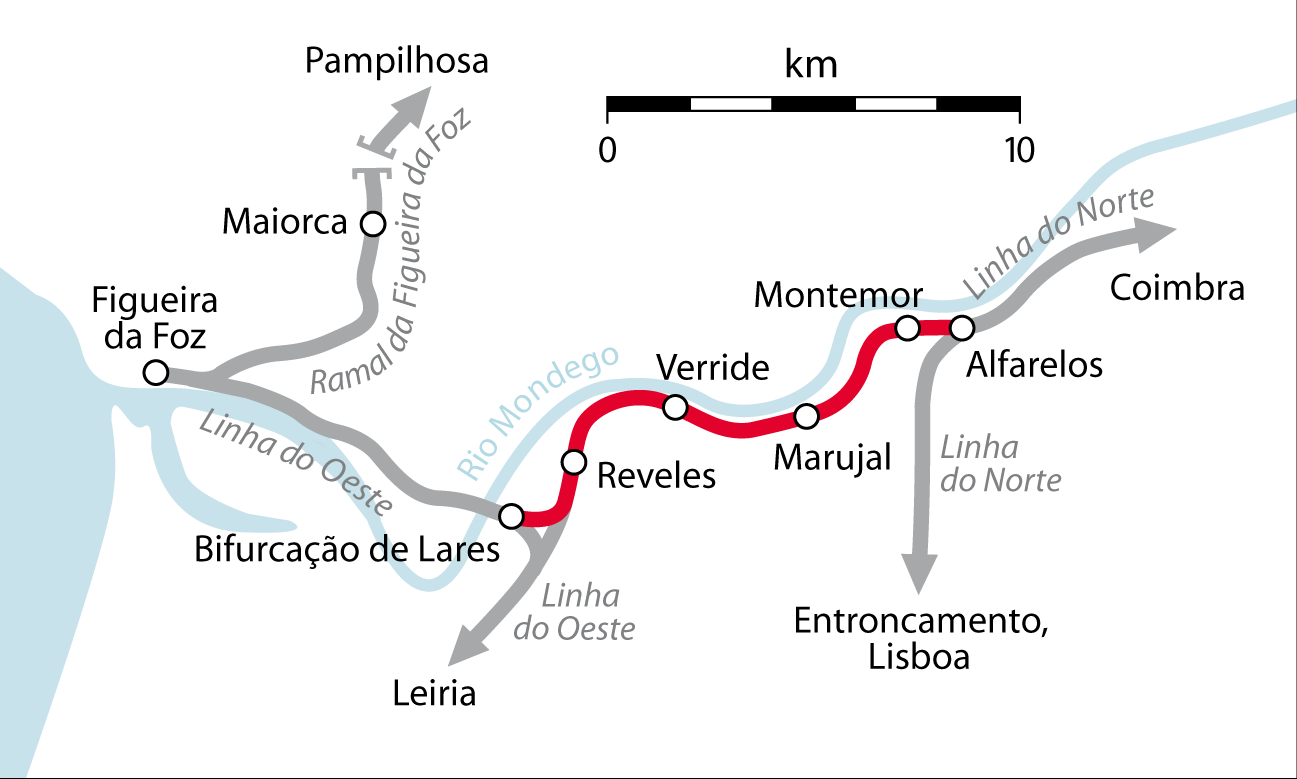

Location on the network
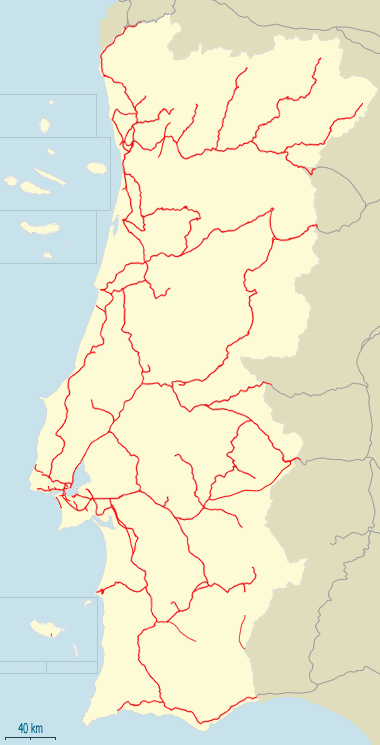

+ Alfarelos × B. de Lares (🔎)

Ramal de Alfarelos is a railway branch in Portugal, which connects the Western Line (at Bifurcação de Lares) to the Northern Line (at Alfarelos), offering a connection between Figueira da Foz and Coimbra.

CP offers both urban and regional services on this branch, as part of the Coimbra urban trains (connecting Coimbra to Figueira da Foz through Alfarelos) and of the Western Line.

== See also ==
- List of railway lines in Portugal
- List of Portuguese locomotives and railcars
- History of rail transport in Portugal
