= José Lima (footballer) =

Portuguese football coach and former player

Personal information
- Full name: José António Ramalho Lima
- Date of birth: 16 October 1966 (age 60)
- Place of birth: Mira-Sintra, Portugal
- Height: 1.81 m (5 ft 11 1/2 in)
- Position: Forward

Team information
- Current team: Sporting CP (youth)

Youth career
- 1978–1981: Mira Sintra
- 1981–1985: Sporting CP

Senior career*
Years	Team	Apps	(Gls)
1985–1992	Sporting CP	62	(6)
1992–1993	Vitória Guimarães	6	(1)
1993–1997	Atlético	84	(28)
1997–1999	Alverca	39	(4)
Total		191	(39)

International career
1988	Portugal U21	1	(0)
1989	Portugal	2	(0)

Managerial career
- 1999–2000: Alverca (assistant)
- 2000–2002: Alverca (youth)
- 2002–2004: Alverca (assistant)
- 2004–2005: Alverca
- 2005–2006: Belenenses (assistant)
- 2006–: Sporting CP (youth)
- 2010: Sporting CP (assistant)
- 2011: Sporting CP (assistant)
- * Club domestic league appearances and goals

José António Ramalho Lima (born 16 October 1966) is a Portuguese retired footballer who played as a forward.

== Football career ==
Born in Mira Sintra, Lisbon, Lima emerged through Sporting Clube de Portugal's prolific youth ranks, but would never be more than a fringe player during his seven-season spell with the main squad. In 1988–89, he appeared in a career-best – for the Lions – 17 matches as the team could only rank fourth in the league; also during that year he gained his only two caps for the Portugal national football team, being definitely released in the 1992 summer.

After an unassuming year at Vitória de Guimarães, Lima moved to the lower leagues and joined Atlético Clube de Portugal. In 1997, at the age of 30, he joined another side in the Lisbon area, F.C. Alverca, helping S.L. Benfica's farm team to its first ever top level participation in the 1998–99 campaign, where the player featured rarely (six games), retiring shortly after.

Immediately afterwards Lima began working as a coach, first assisting José Romão then José Couceiro at his last club, Alverca. The following year, with the team in the second level, he was promoted to head coach but the club folded soon after.

Following a four-year spell with former side Sporting's juniors, Lima joined Carlos Carvalhal's coaching staff at the main squad in early November 2009, after Paulo Bento's sacking. In March 2011 he returned in the same predicament, under Couceiro.
