= Automotora VIP =

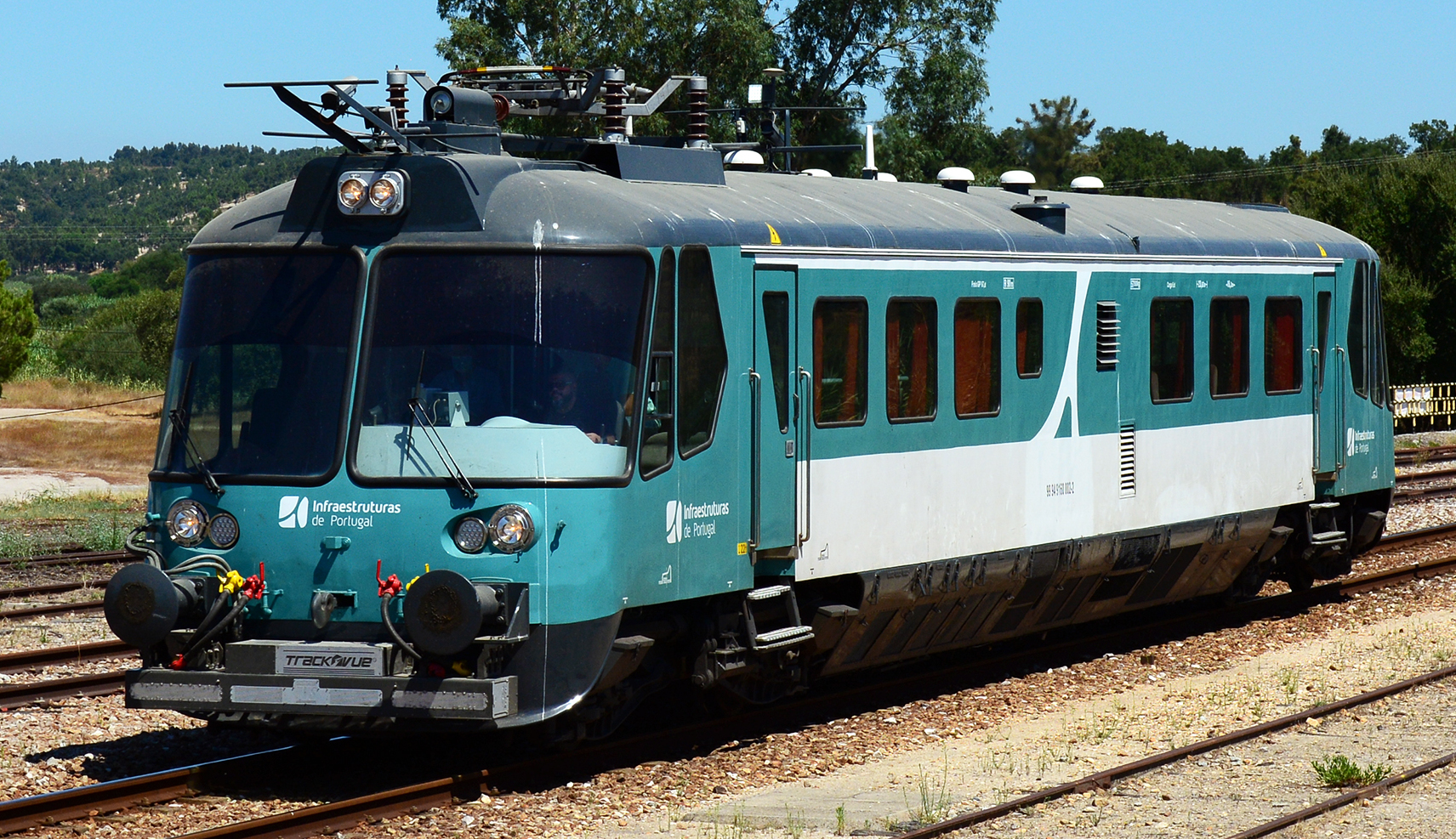
- Automotora VIP at Ponte de Sor, 2020
- Manufacturer: Allan of Rotterdam (CP 0301)
- Constructed: 1954 (CP 0301)
- Entered service: 1992
- Refurbished: CP Figueira da Foz workshops (1992)
- Number built: 1
- Number in service: 1
- Operators: Infraestruturas de Portugal

Specifications
- Maximum speed: 100 kilometres per hour (62 mph)
- Transmission: Electric
- HVAC: Air conditioning
- Track gauge: 1,668 mm (5 ft 5 21/32 in)

Automotora VIP is a diesel-electric railbus currently used for catenary maintenance by Infraestruturas de Portugal. It was created as a railbus for VIP services in 1992 by refurbishing CP 0301 at CP's Figueira da Foz workshops.
