= Amadora railway station =

Railway station in Amadora, Portugal

Amadora
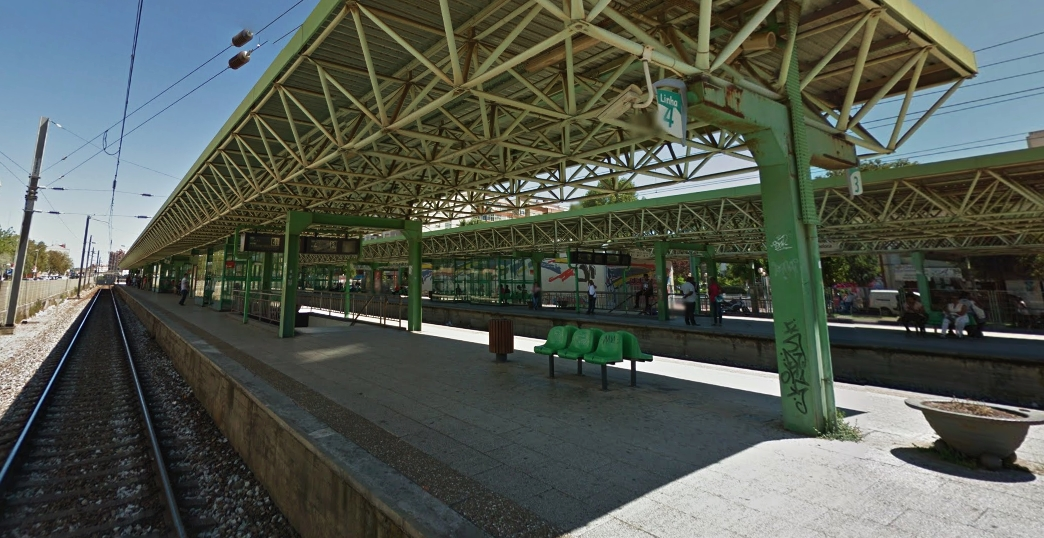
- The platforms of Amadora Station, September 2021

General information
- Location: 2700-159 Amadora; Portugal
- Coordinates: 38°45′35.53″N 9°14′9.79″W
- Elevation: 140 m (460 ft)
- Operator: Lisbon CP
- Manager: Infraestruturas de Portugal
- Line: Sintra Line
- Distance: 10.0 km from Rossio
- Platforms: 2 island platforms
- Tracks: 4

Construction
- Accessible: Yes

History
- Opened: 16 April 1888

Services
Preceding station	Lisbon CP	Following station
Queluz-Belas towards Sintra	Sintra Line	Reboleira towards Rossio
Queluz-Belas towards Sintra	Sintra Line	Reboleira towards Oriente
Queluz-Belas towards Sintra	Sintra Line	Reboleira towards Alverca
Queluz-Belas towards Mira Sintra-Meleças	Sintra Line	Reboleira towards Rossio
Location

Amadora Station (Portuguese: Estação Ferroviária da Amadora) is a railway station located in the city of Amadora. It is served by the Sintra and Azambuja Lines. It is managed by Infraestruturas de Portugal.

== Service ==
Trains stop at Amadora Station at approximately 15-minute intervals on weekends and off-peak periods on weekdays. During peak periods, trains stop at Amadora Station at approximately 5-minute intervals, with some trains arriving within a minute of each other.

== Station layout ==
Amadora Station consists of two island platforms serving four tracks.

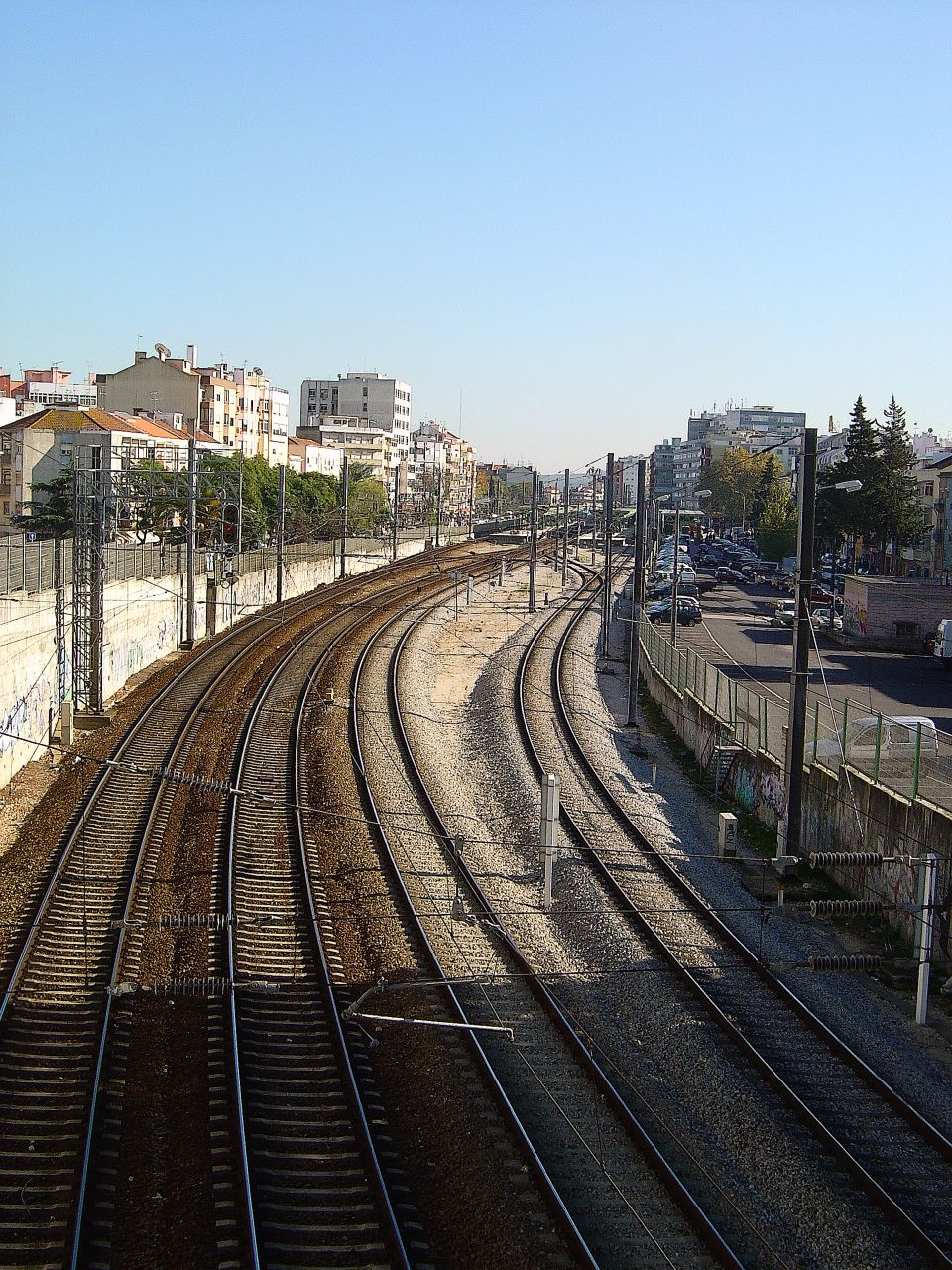
The tracks in the direction of Sintra, December 2005

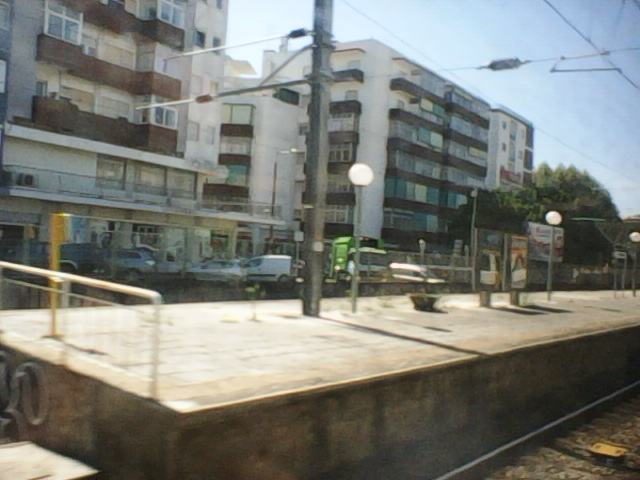
View from a train of the end of a platform at Amadora Station, August 2020

== History ==
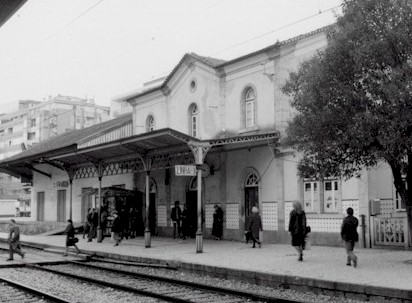
Amadora Station in the 1950s.

Amadora Station opened on 16 April 1888, originally under the name of Porcalhota. It was renamed Amadora on 1 February 1908. The station building was rebuilt as a part of a modernization project of the Sintra Line and put into service on 15 May 1993. The quadrupling of the Sintra Line tracks between Benfica and Amadora was completed in September 1999.

== Surrounding area ==
- Centro Comercial Babilónia, a double-story shopping mall with 60 stores
