= Agualva-Cacém =

- City
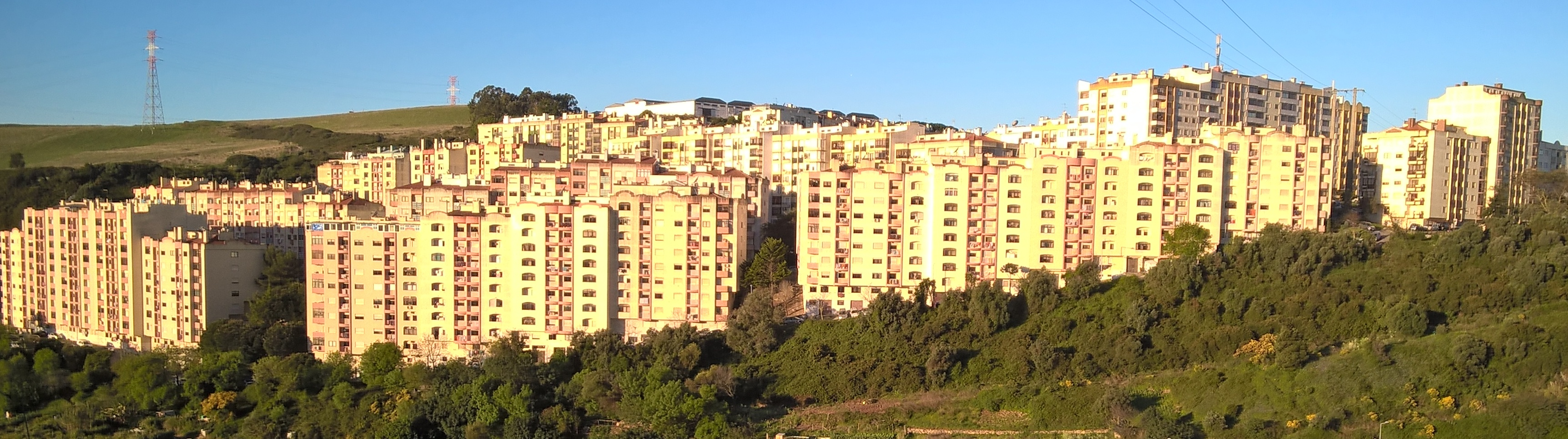
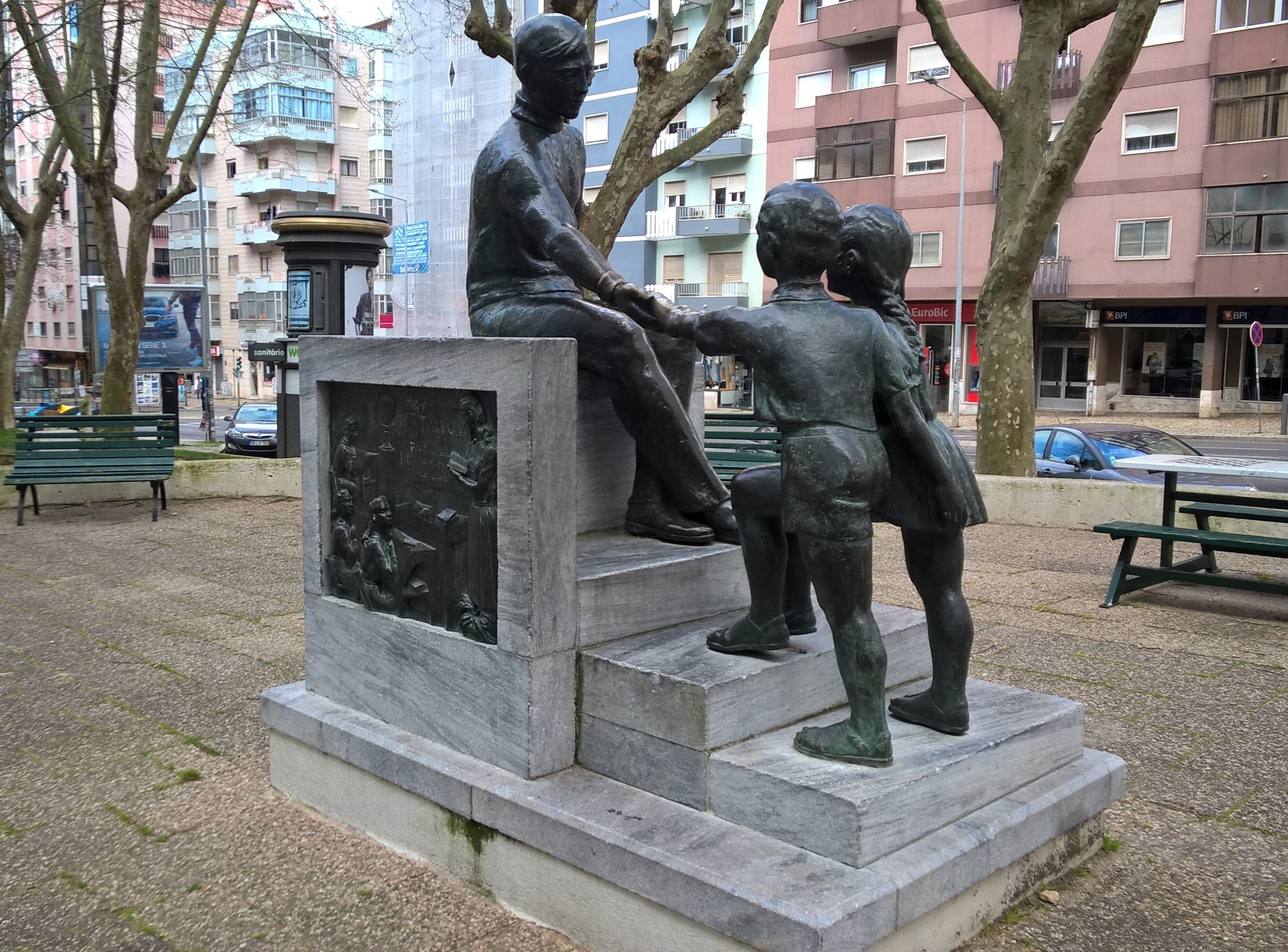
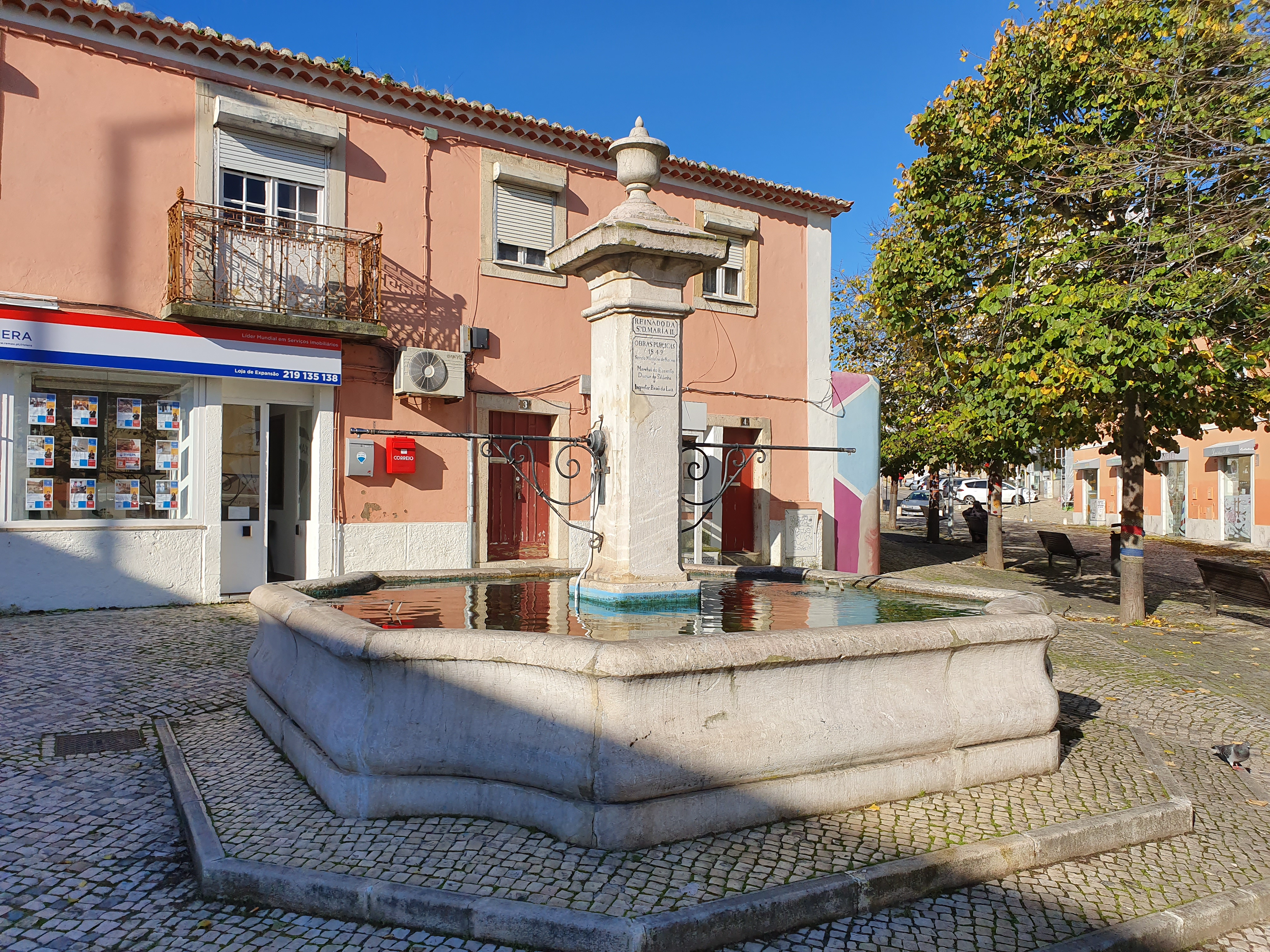
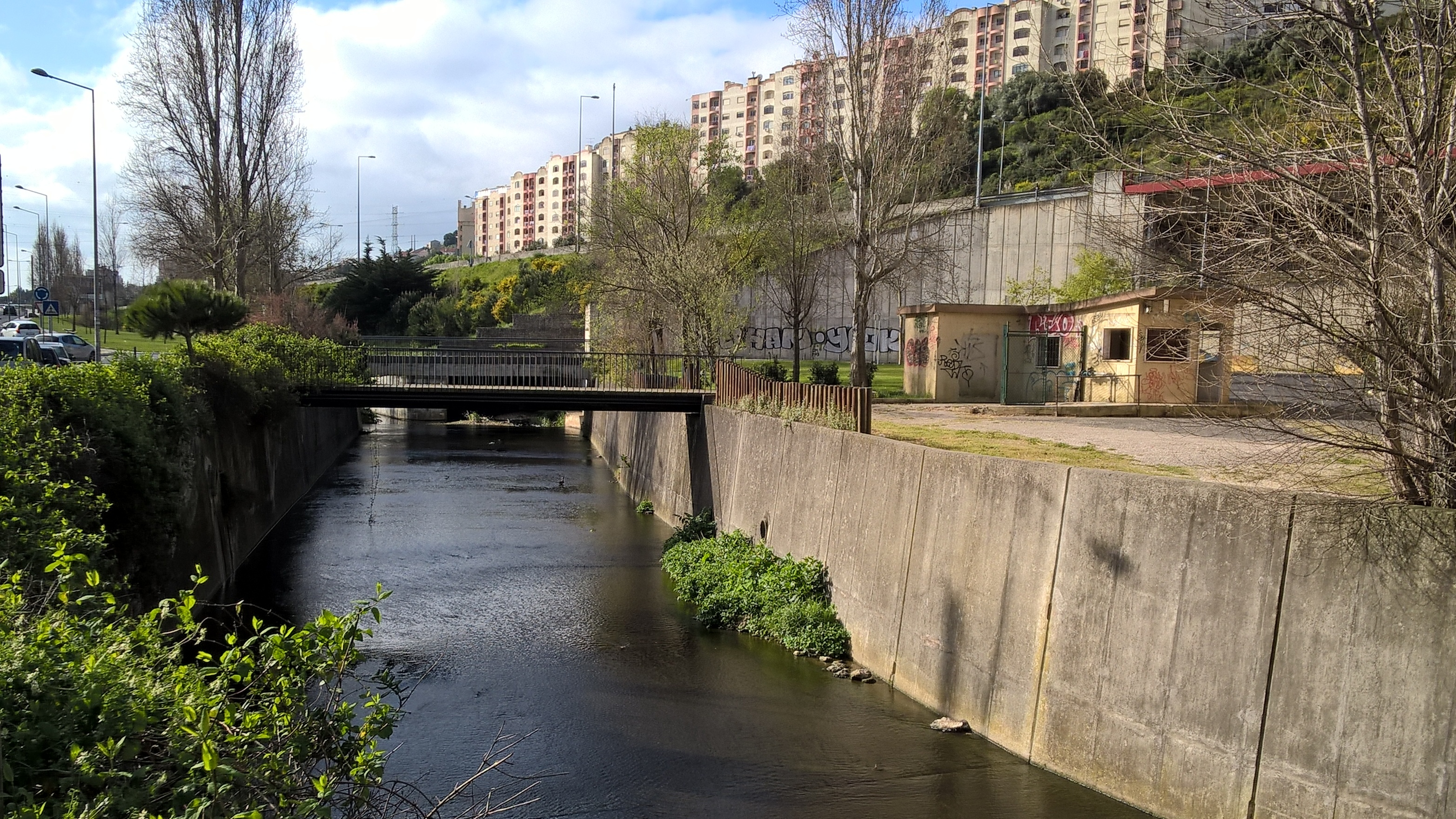
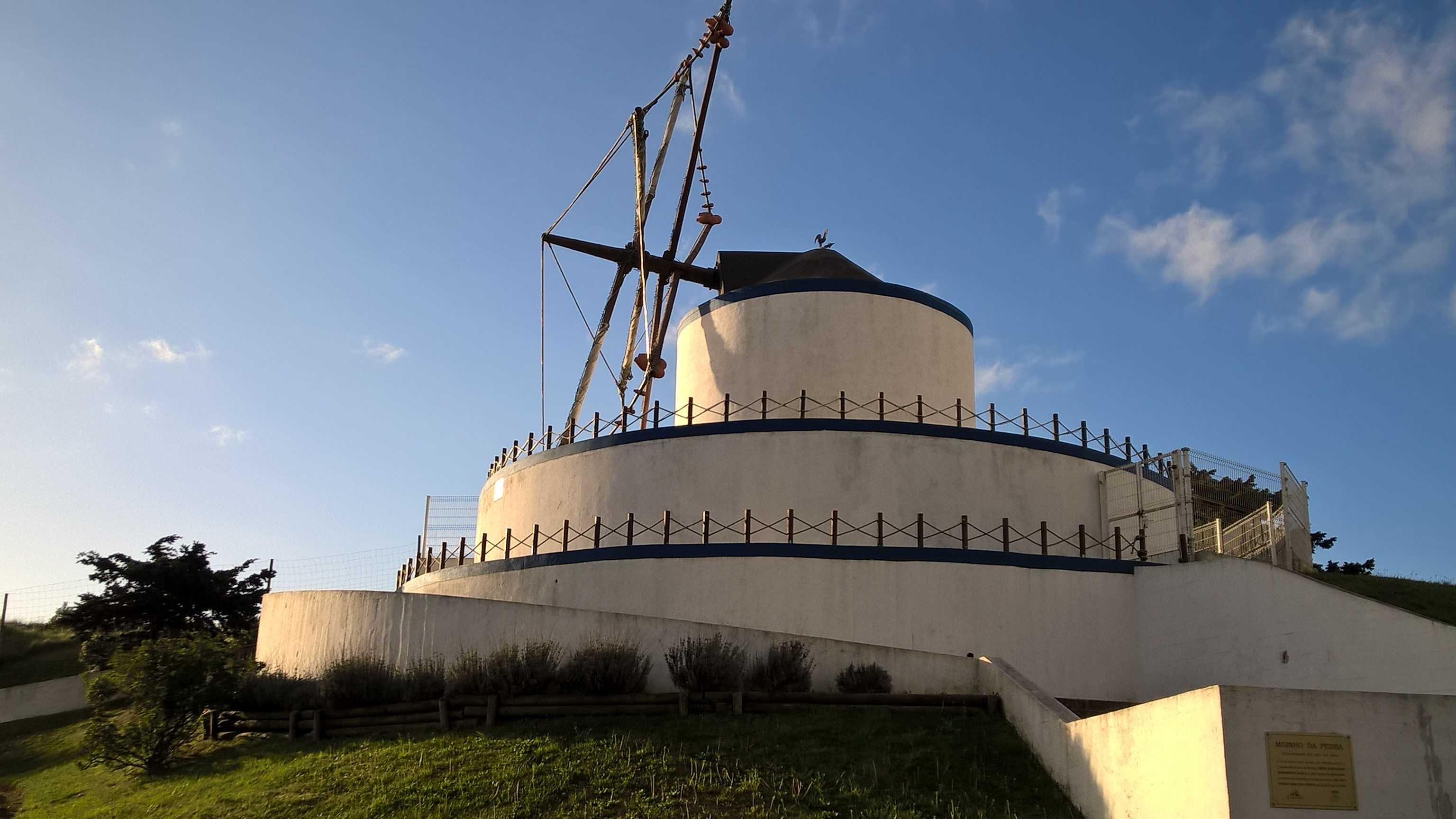

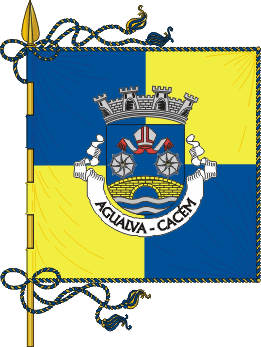
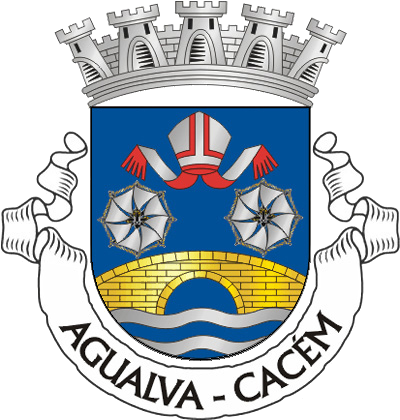
- Flag Coat of arms

- Location of Agualva-Cacém
- Coordinates: 38°46′4″N 9°17′58″W
- Country: Portugal
- Region: Lisbon
- Subregion: Greater Lisbon
- District: Lisbon
- Municipality: Sintra
- Municipality: Sintra

Area
  - Total: 127 km^{2} (49 sq mi)
- Elevation: 43 m (141 ft)

Population (2001)
  - Total: 81,845
  - Density: 644/km^{2} (1,670/sq mi)
- Refers to the urbanized portions of the parishes of Agualva, Cacém, Mira-Sintra and São Marcos only
- Demonyms: Cacémense (from Cacém), Agualvense (from Agualva)
- Time zone: UTC0 (WET)
  - Summer (DST): UTC+1 (WEST)
- Postal code: 2735-000:2735-999
- Postal Zone: (+351) 21X XXX XXX
- ISO 3166 code: PT
- Website: www.agualvacacem.com

Agualva-Cacém (Portuguese pronunciation: [ɐˈɣwalvɐ kɐˈsɐ̃j]) is a Portuguese city within the municipality of Sintra, in the Lisbon metropolitan area. It comprises the civil parishes of Agualva e Mira Sintra and Cacém e São Marcos, equivalent to 81,845 inhabitants of the municipalities population.

== History ==
The toponym "Agualva" is derived from the Latin Aqua alba, meaning white (pure) water, while "Cacém" is derived from the Arabic Qāsim (قاسم), meaning "the one who distributes".

The name Agualva-Cacém belonged to a civil parish that encompassed 10.51 km^{2} (4.1 sq mi) of the municipality of Sintra. On 12 July 2001, that parish was elevated to the status of city and divided into four civil parishes, which, in 2013, were then merged into two unions of parishes: União das Freguesias de Agualva e Mira-Sintra and União das Freguesias do Cacém e São Marcos.

The train station (Agualva-Cacém railway station) has existed since 1887 (then under the operation of the Larmanjat railway company). Remodeling works began in 2008, with the new station building opening in 2013.

== Geography ==
Agualva-Cacém falls within the Greater Lisbon subregion, an area of mostly residential suburbs.

== Architecture ==
- Anta de Agualva
- Gruta do Colaride

== Notable citizens ==
- D. Domingos Jardo, Bishop of Lisbon (1289-1293)
- Bebé, footballer
- José Lima, footballer

== Sport ==
There are several football clubs in Agualva-Cacém and two futsal clubs; these include:

- Atlético Clube do Cacém
- Grupo Desportivo Os Nacionais
- Grupo Desportivo do Bairro Azul
- Ginásio Clube 1° de Maio de Agualva
- Clube Unidos do Cacém
- Novos Talentos
