= Reboleira railway station =

Railway station in Amadora, Portugal

Reboleira
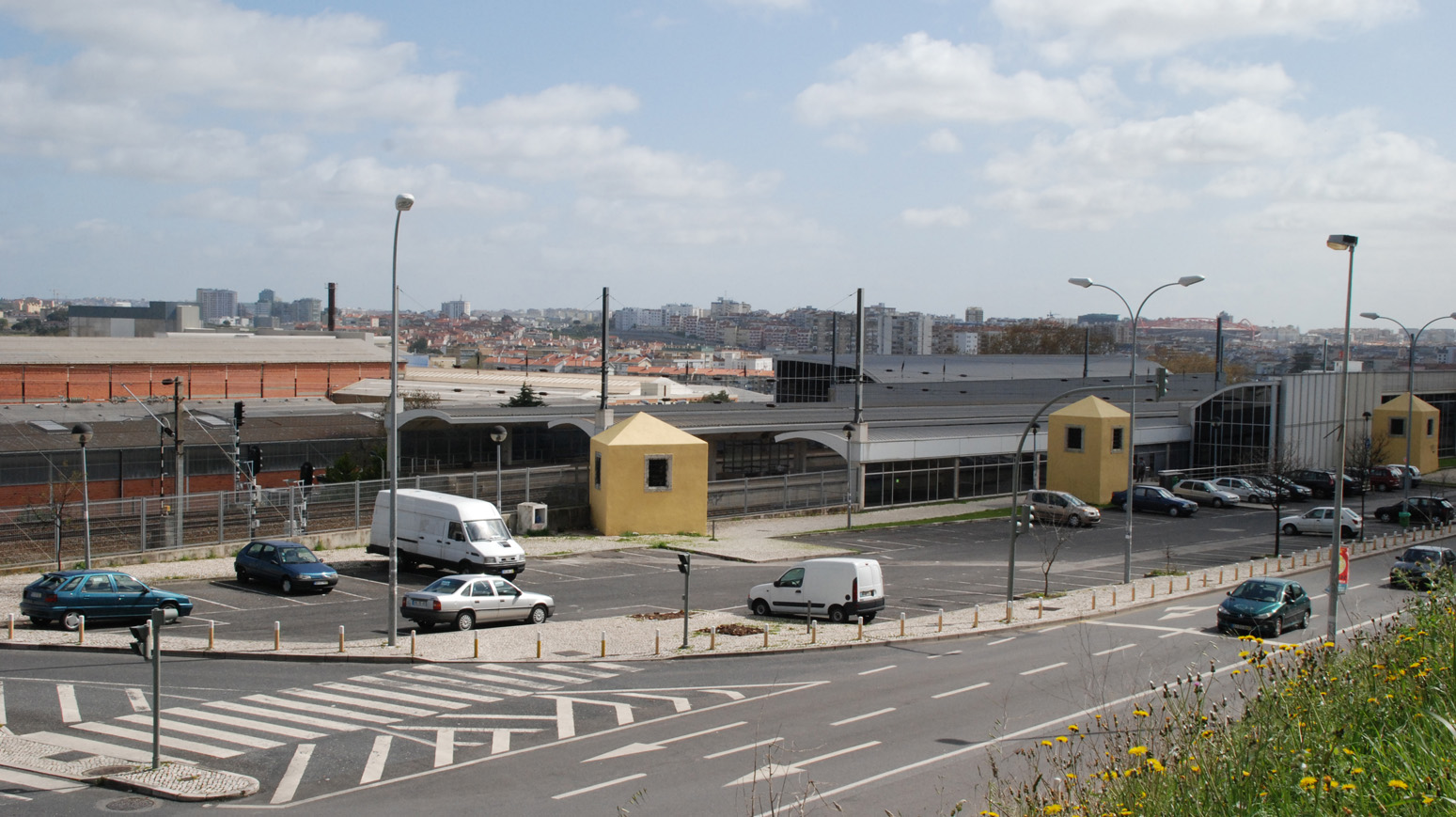
- View of Reboleira Station from the southwest, September 2021

General information
- Location: 2720-161 Amadora; Portugal
- Coordinates: 38.7993°N 9.3855°W
- Operator: Infraestruturas de Portugal
- Line: Sintra Line
- Distance: 8.4 km from Rossio
- Platforms: 2 side platforms + 1 island platform
- Tracks: 4
- Connections: Reboleira

Construction
- Accessible: Yes

History
- Opened: 27 November 1999

Services
Preceding station	Lisbon CP	Following station
Amadora towards Sintra	Sintra Line	Santa Cruz-Damaia towards Rossio
Amadora towards Sintra	Sintra Line	Santa Cruz-Damaia towards Oriente
Amadora towards Sintra	Sintra Line	Santa Cruz-Damaia towards Alverca
Amadora towards Mira Sintra-Meleças	Sintra Line	Santa Cruz-Damaia towards Rossio
Location

Reboleira Station (Portuguese: Estação Ferroviária da Reboleira) is a railway station located in the city of Amadora. It is served by the Sintra and Azambuja Lines. It is operated by Infraestruturas de Portugal.

== Service ==
Trains stop at Reboleira Station at approximately 15-minute intervals on weekends and off-peak periods on weekdays. During peak periods, trains stop at Reboleira Station at approximately 5-minute intervals, with some trains arriving within a minute of each other.

== Station layout ==
Reboleira Station consists of two side platforms and one island platform serving four tracks.

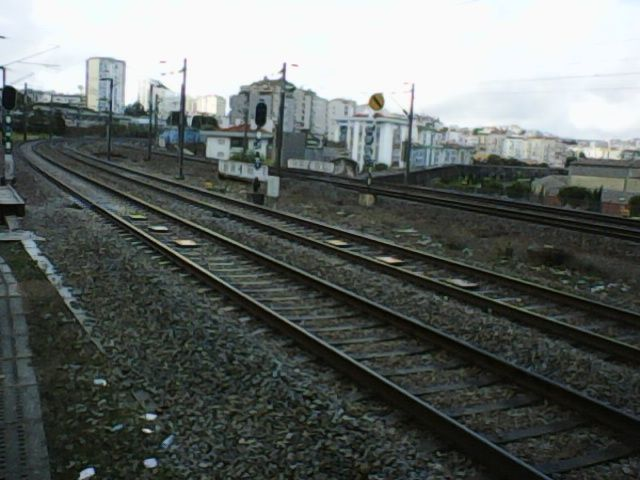
The tracks in the direction of Sintra, October 2019

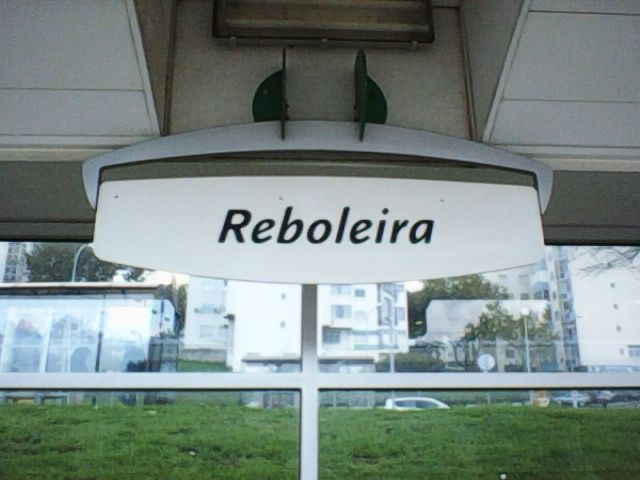
Reboleira's station sign, October 2019

== History ==
Reboleira Station opened on 27 November 1999 as an infill station on the Sintra Line, following the quadrupling of the tracks between Benfica and Amadora. A connection to the Lisbon Metro Blue Line opened on 13 April 2016.

== Surrounding area ==
- Estádio José Gomes
