= Agualva-Cacém railway station =

Railway station in Agualva-Cacém, Portugal

Agualva-Cacém
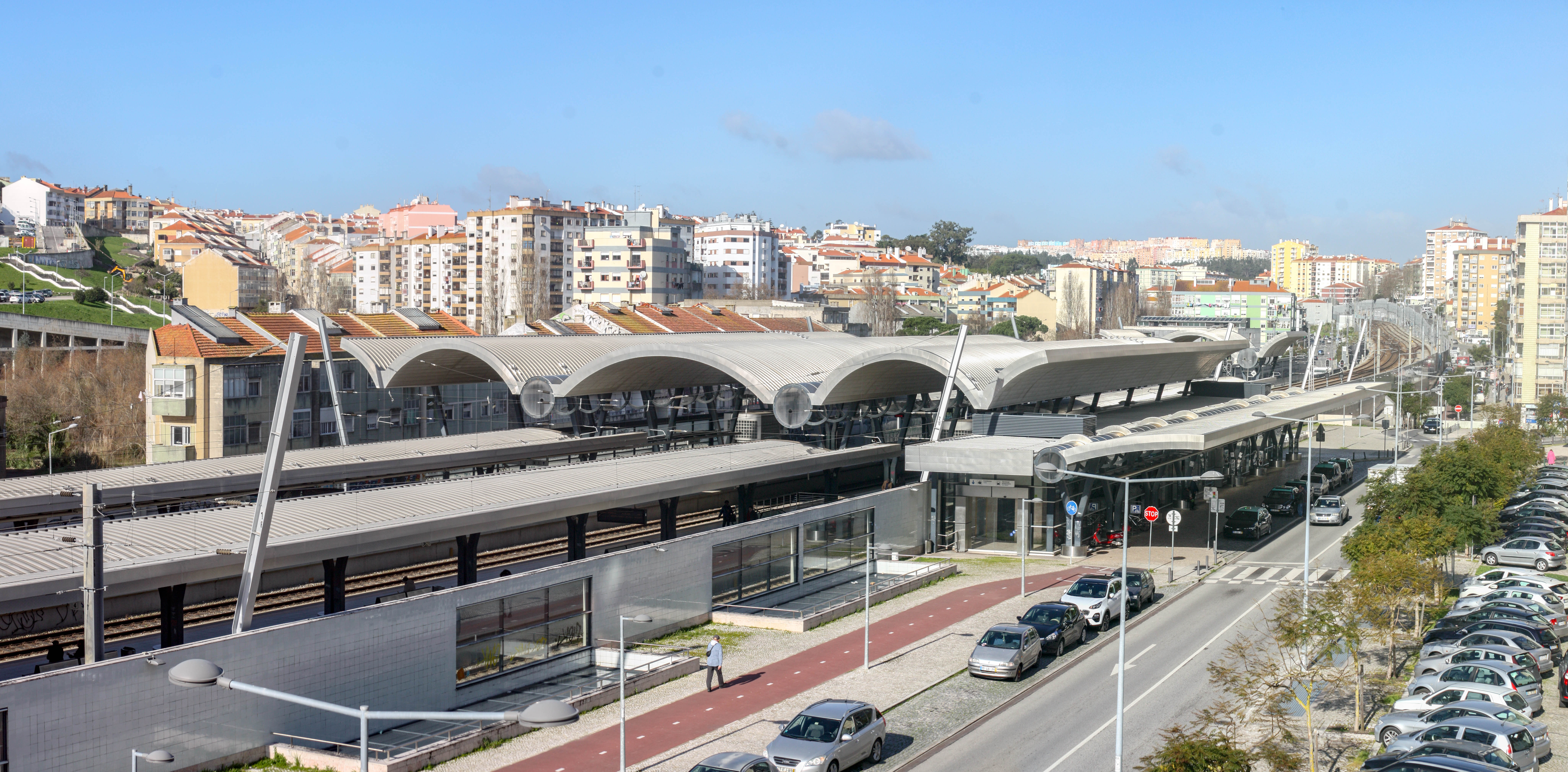
- View of Agualva-Cacém Station from above, January 2020

General information
- Location: Largo da Estação, 2735-101, Agualva-Cacém; Portugal
- Coordinates: 38°45′59.59″N 9°17′54.97″W
- Operator: Lisbon CP
- Manager: Infraestruturas de Portugal
- Lines: Sintra Line; Linha do Oeste
- Distance: 17.3 km from Rossio
- Platforms: 2 island platforms
- Tracks: 4

Construction
- Structure type: Ground-level
- Accessible: Yes

History
- Opened: 2 April 1887

Services
Preceding station	Comboios de Portugal	Following station
Mira Sintra-Meleças towards Caldas da Rainha	InterRegional	Sete Rios towards Lisbon-Santa Apolónia
Mira Sintra-Meleças towards Caldas da Rainha	Regional	Sete Rios towards Lisbon-Santa Apolónia
Other services
Preceding station	Lisbon CP	Following station
Rio de Mouro towards Sintra	Sintra Line	Massamá-Barcarena towards Rossio
Rio de Mouro towards Sintra	Sintra Line	Massamá-Barcarena towards Oriente
Rio de Mouro towards Sintra	Sintra Line	Massamá-Barcarena towards Alverca
Mira Sintra-Meleças Terminus	Sintra Line	Massamá-Barcarena towards Rossio
Location

Agualva-Cacém Station (Portuguese: Estação Ferroviária de Agualva-Cacém) is a railway station located in the city of Agualva-Cacém, Portugal. It is served by the Sintra Line, Linha do Oeste, and Azambuja Line. It is operated by Lisbon CP and managed by Infraestruturas de Portugal.

== Service ==
Regional and InterRegional services stop at Agualva-Cacém Station roughly eight times daily in each direction.

Urban trains stop at Agualva-Cacém Station at approximately 15-minute intervals on weekends and off-peak periods on weekdays. During peak periods, trains stop at Agualva-Cacém Station at approximately 5-minute intervals, with some trains arriving within a minute of each other.

== Station layout ==
Agualva-Cacém Station serves as the junction between the Sintra Line and the Linha do Oeste. It is on ground level. Buses operate from the east side of the station.

=== Platforms ===
Agualva-Cacém Station is composed of two island platforms serving four tracks.

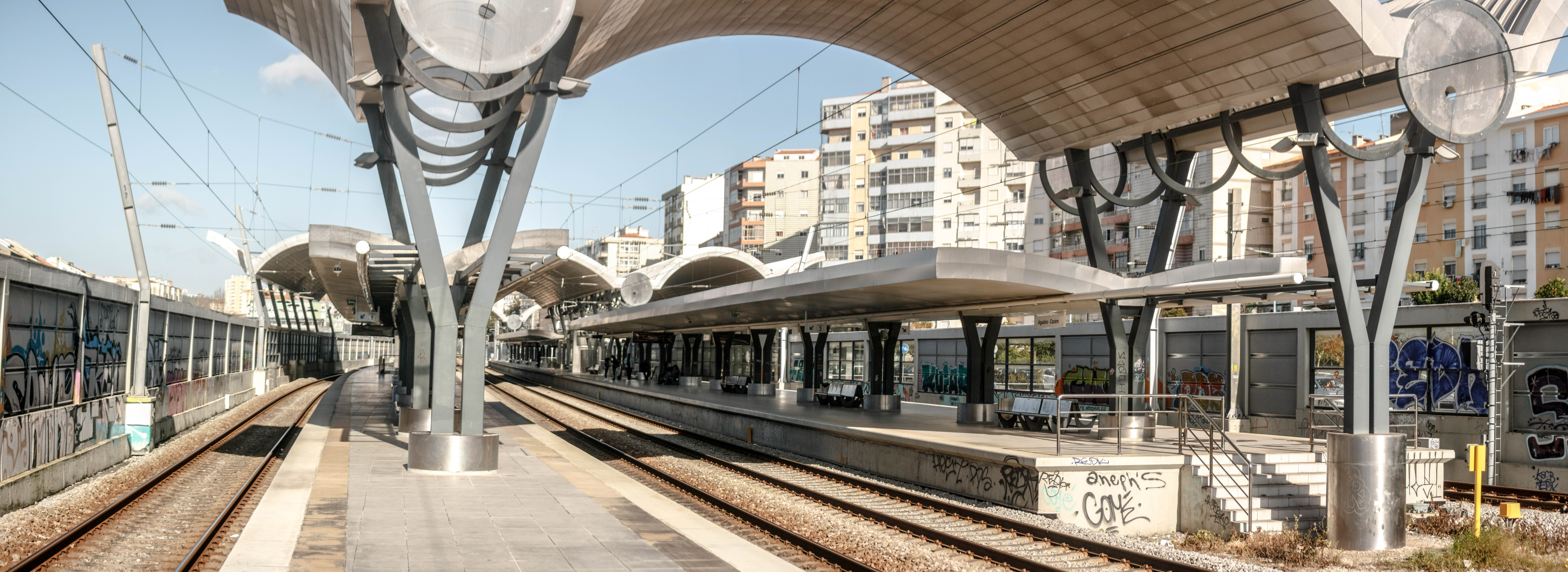
Panorama of the station platforms, January 2020

== History ==
Agualva-Cacém Station opened on 2 April 1887 as the junction point between the Linha do Oeste and the Sintra Line between Alcântara-Terra and Sintra. The southern terminus of the Sintra Line was shifted to Rossio following that station's completion on 11 June 1890. The station received an extensive modernization starting in 2007 as part of a Sintra Line renovation project. The new station building was inaugurated on 6 May 2013, with the addition of quadruple tracks and another set of platforms.

== Surrounding area ==
- Quantum Park
- Casal do Cotão
