= Abrantes railway station =

Railway station in Portugal

Abrantes
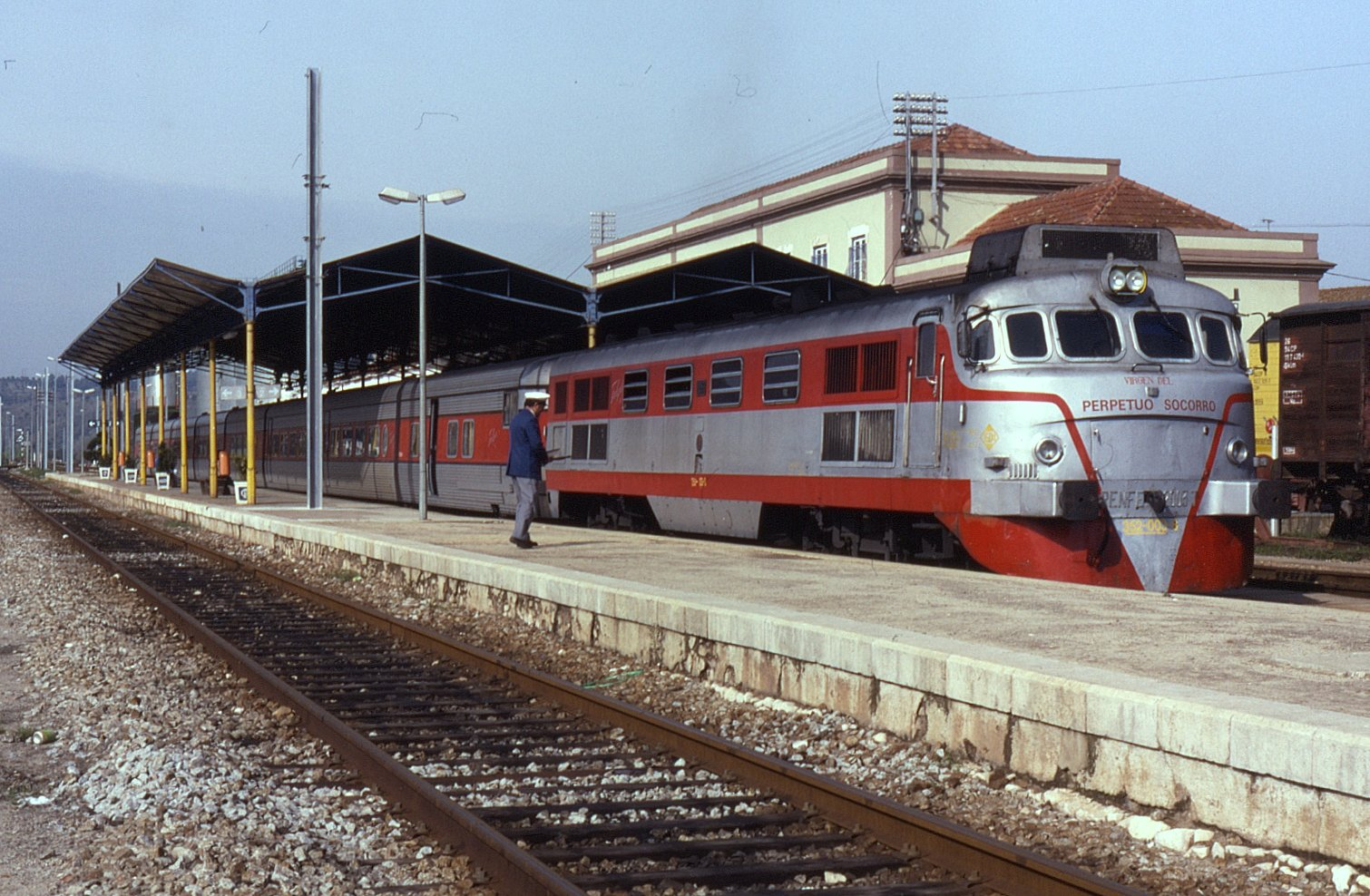
- A Talgo train at Abrantes Station in 1993

General information
- Location: São Miguel do Rio Torto e Rossio ao Sul do Tejo, Abrantes; Portugal
- Coordinates: 39°26′25″N 8°11′40″W
- Lines: Linha da Beira Baixa, Linha do Leste
- Platforms: 2

Construction
- Accessible: Yes

History
- Opened: 7 November 1862

Services
Preceding station	Comboios de Portugal	Following station
Entroncamento towards Lisbon-Santa Apolónia	Intercidades Via Linha da Beira Baixa	Ródão towards Guarda
Tramagal towards Lisbon-Santa Apolónia	Regional	Alferrarede towards Castelo Branco
Tramagal towards Entroncamento	Regional	Alferrarede towards Castelo Branco
Tramagal towards Entroncamento	Regional International Service	Bemposta towards Badajoz
Location

Abrantes Station is a railway station in Abrantes, Santarém, Portugal.

== History ==
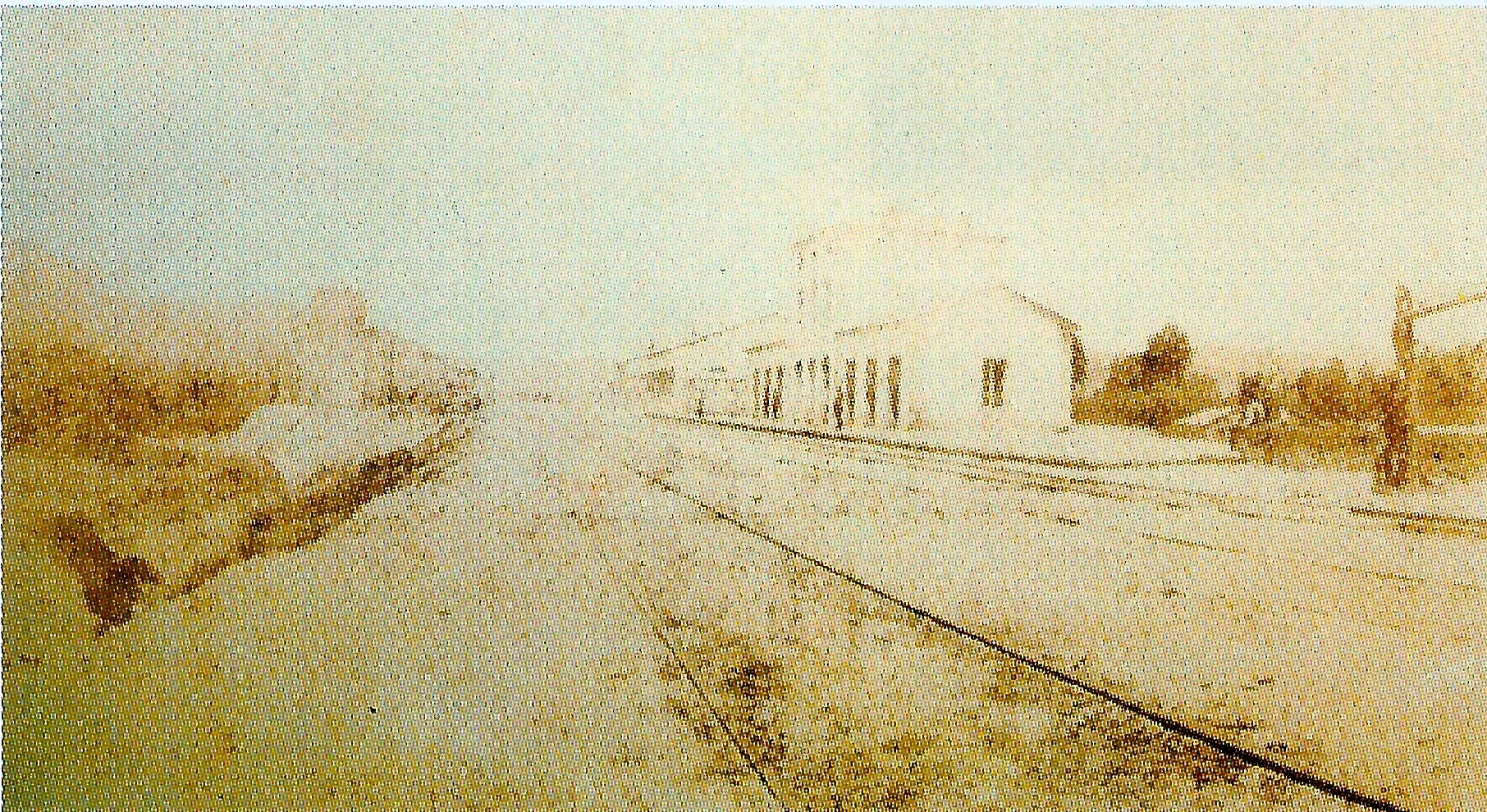
Abrantes Station in the second half of the 19th century

The station opened on 7 November 1862 and was inaugurated on 5 May 1863, connecting Abrantes and Crato. It was opened by (now defunct) Companhia Real dos Caminhos de Ferro Portugueses, later called Companhia dos Caminhos de Ferro Portugueses.

On 18 March 1873, in order to connect Abrantes Station to Linha da Beira Baixa, plans were made by Joaquim J. de Almeida to connect Abrantes to Monfortinho, right next to the Spanish border. Similar plans were later made on 1 February 1879 by Lourenço de Carvalho (who was the Minister and Secretary of State for Business of Public Works, Commerce and Industry). It was later connected by Covilhã on 6 September 1891.

It was mentioned by Hans Christian Andersen in his book A Visit to Portugal in 1866.

The Linha da Beira Baixa became a line to the Abrantes station at a later time than the Linha do Leste.

== Lines ==
- Linha da Beira Baixa
- Linha do Leste

== Layout ==
According to Infraestruturas de Portugal, although it has two platforms with 207 m in length and 70 cm in height, there are three railway tracks with 508, 311, and 271 m in length. Despite its name, it's farther away from the center of Abrantes than the Alferrarede Railway Station.
