= Linha do Oeste =

Railway line in Portugal

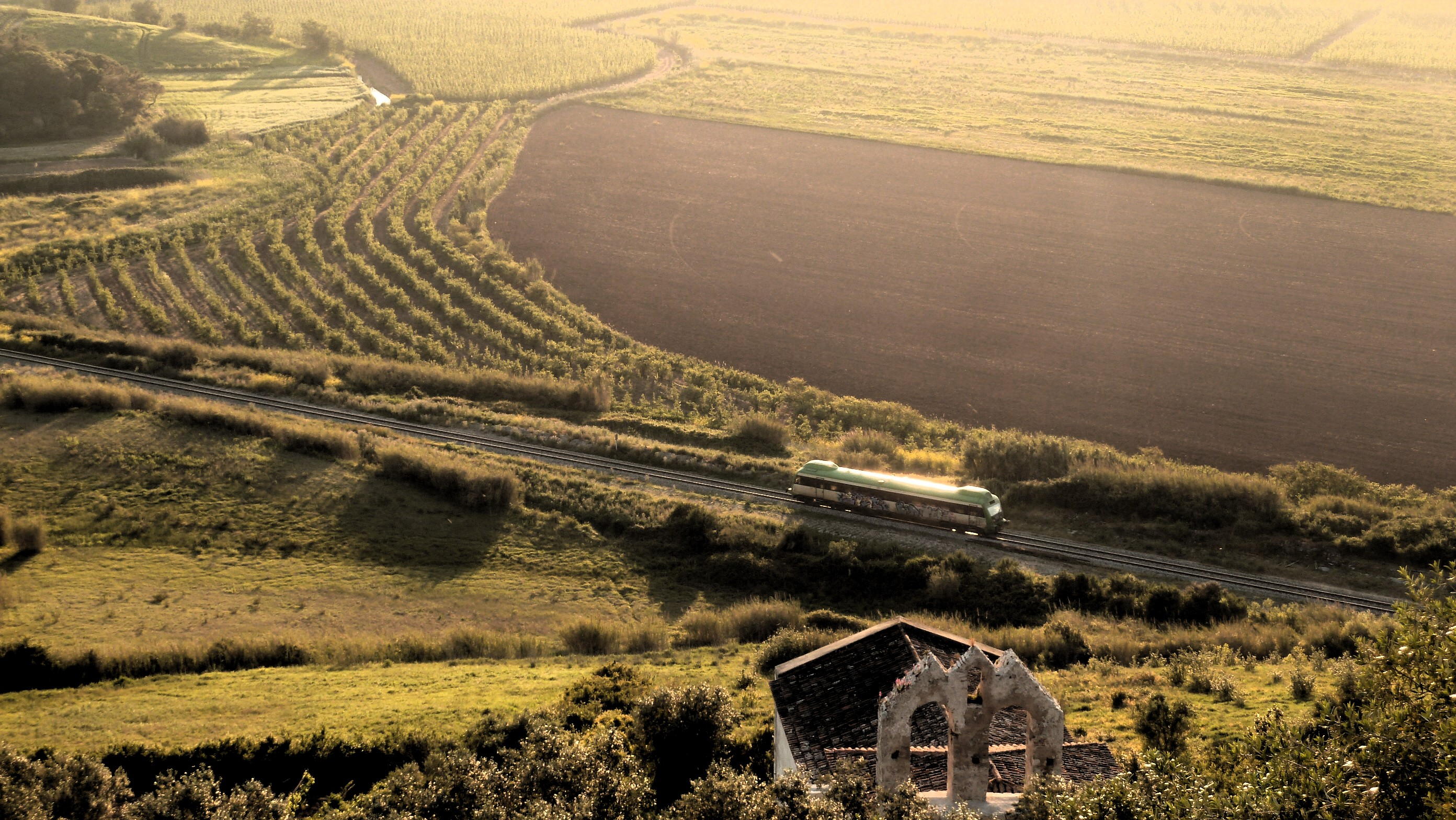
- CP Class 0350 at Óbidos.

Overview
- Status: Operational
- Owner: Infraestruturas de Portugal
- Termini: Agualva-Cacém; Figueira da Foz
- Connecting lines: Alfarelos branch and Sintra line
- Former connections: Figueira da Foz branch

Service
- Operator(s): Comboios de Portugal

History
- Opened: 1887

Technical
- Line length: 215.1 km (133.7 mi)
- Number of tracks: Single track, except Meleças-Cacém (double)
- Track gauge: Iberian
- Electrification: None, except Meleças-Cacém and Louriçal-Figueira (25 kV 50 Hz catenary)
- Signalling: Telephonic block, except Meleças-Cacém (automatic block signalling)
- Train protection system: None, except Meleças-Cacém (CONVEL)

Location on the network
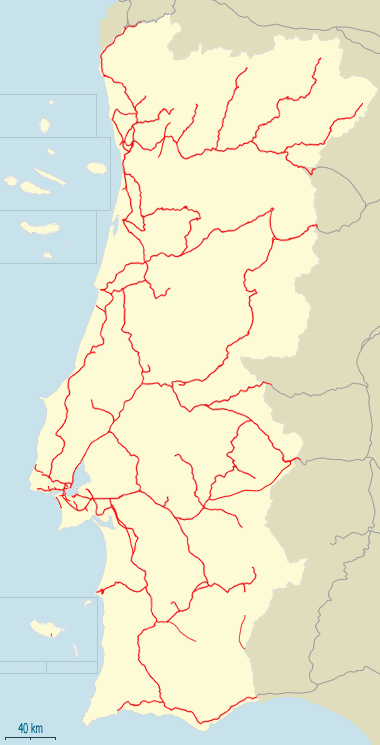

+ Cacém × Fig. Foz (🔎)

Linha do Oeste (Western Line) is a railway line serving the central western coast of Portugal belonging to Infraestruturas de Portugal network. The line was opened in 1887.

Passenger services are operated by CP. The line is used also by freight trains from CP; the new private freight operator Takargo also plans services using this line.

== See also ==
- List of railway lines in Portugal
- List of Portuguese locomotives and railcars
- History of rail transport in Portugal
