= Linha da Beira Baixa =

Railway line in Portugal

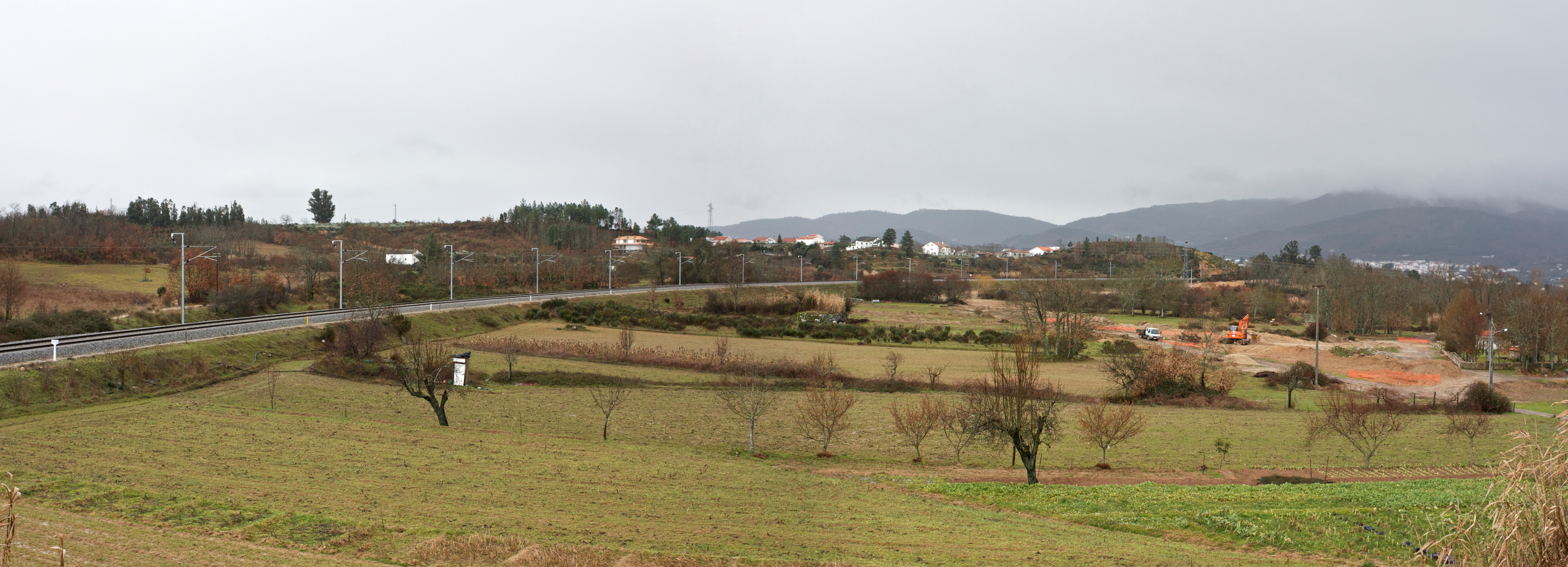
- Linha da Beira Baixa close to Fundão.

Overview
- Status: Operational
- Owner: Infraestruturas de Portugal
- Termini: Entroncamento; Guarda

Technical
- Track gauge: Iberian
- Electrification: 25 kV / 50 Hz Overhead line
Route map
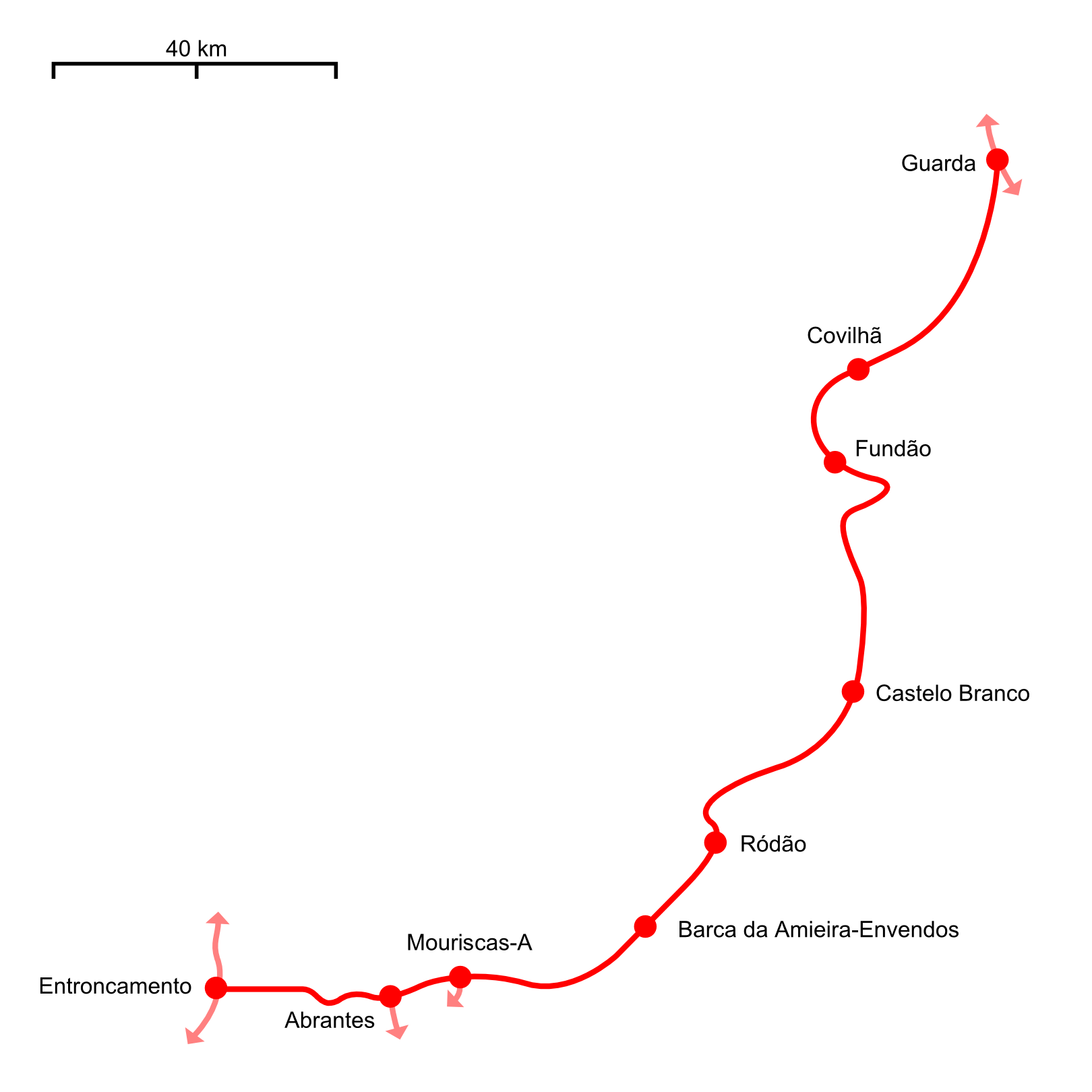

Location on the network
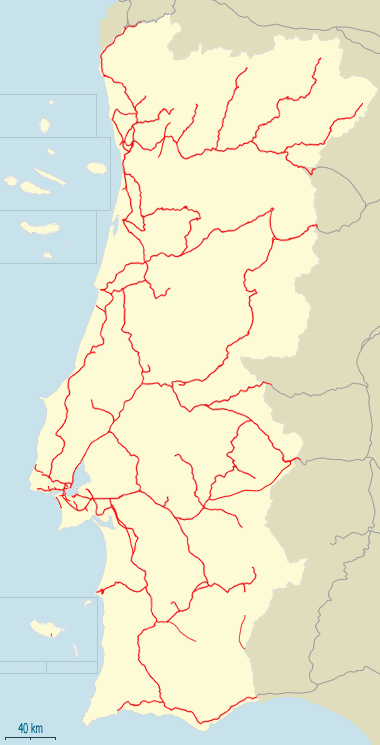

+ Entroncamento × Guarda (🔎)

Linha da Beira Baixa, originally called Caminho de Ferro da Beira Baixa, is a railway line which connects the stations of Entroncamento and Guarda in central Portugal. The first section, from Abrantes to Covilhã was opened on 6 September 1891. The line to Guarda was opened on 11 May 1893. At the time, only the section from Abrantes to Guarda was considered to be part of Linha da Beira Baixa, while the route from Entroncamento to Abrantes belonged to the Linha do Leste. Passenger service on the Guarda-Covilhã segment reopened on 2 May 2021 after it fell into disuse in 2009.

== See also ==
- List of railway lines in Portugal
- List of Portuguese locomotives and railcars
- History of rail transport in Portugal
