= Tejo Energia =

Energy and utility company in Portugal

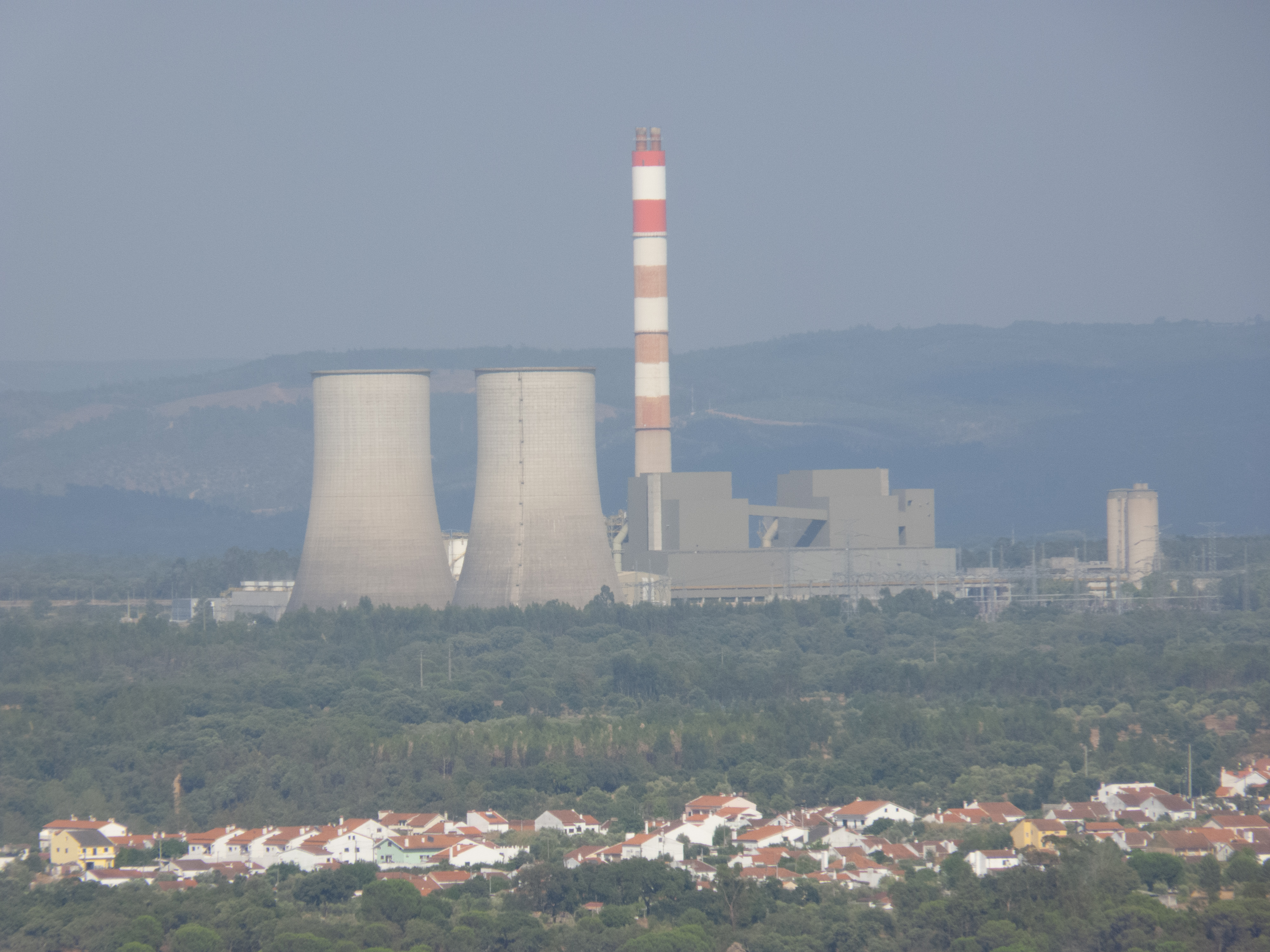
Pego Central nuclear power plant owned by Tejo Energia

Tejo Energia is an energy and utility company in Portugal, and one of the largest private sector Portuguese companies by asset value.

It is headquartered in the Paço de Arcos civil parish of Oeiras, in the Lisbon District of Portugal.

Tejo Energia operated the Pego Power Station til 2021.

== See also ==
- Energy companies of Portugal
- Oeiras, Portugal topics
