= Mira Sintra-Meleças railway station =

Railway station in Sintra, Portugal

Mira Sintra-Meleças
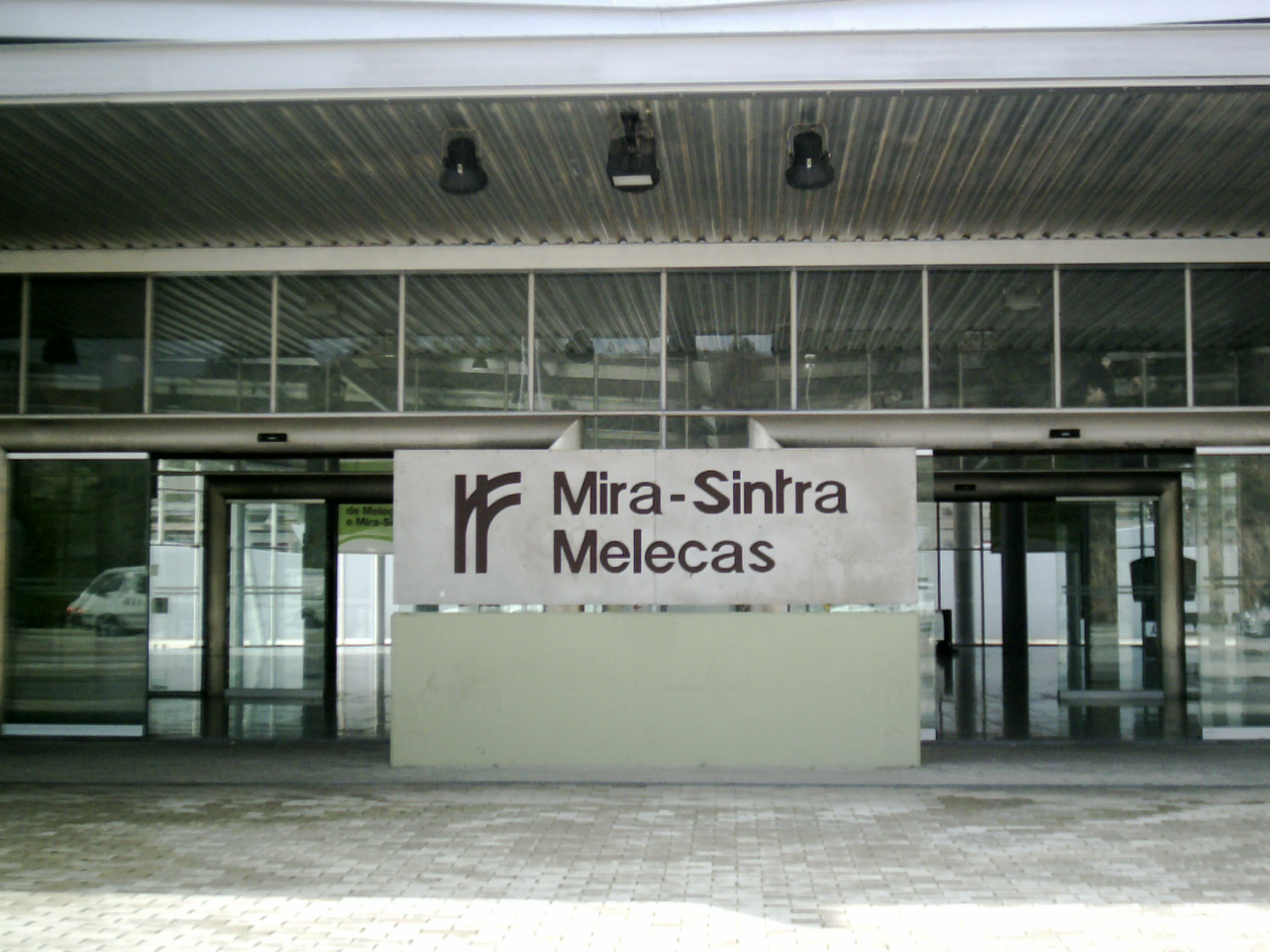
- The station entrance, December 2006

General information
- Location: Belas, Sintra; Portugal
- Coordinates: 38°47′22.524″N 9°18′45.54″W
- Operator: Lisbon CP
- Manager: Infraestruturas de Portugal
- Line: Linha do Oeste
- Distance: 20.3 km from Rossio
- Platforms: 2 island platforms
- Tracks: 4

Construction
- Structure type: Ground-level
- Accessible: Yes

History
- Opened: 29 November 2004

Services
Preceding station	Comboios de Portugal	Following station
Sabugo towards Caldas da Rainha	InterRegional	Agualva-Cacém towards Lisbon-Santa Apolónia
Sabugo towards Caldas da Rainha	Regional	Agualva-Cacém towards Lisbon-Santa Apolónia
Sabugo towards Caldas da Rainha	Regional	Terminus
Preceding station	Lisbon CP	Following station
Terminus	Sintra Line	Agualva-Cacém towards Rossio
Location

Mira Sintra-Meleças Station (Portuguese: Estação Ferroviária de Mira Sintra-Meleças) is a railway station located in the city of Sintra, Portugal. Located in the Western line, it is served by all Western line services as well as a CP Lisboa Sintra Line commuter service connecting to Rossio. It is operated by CP and managed by Infraestruturas de Portugal.

== Service ==
The station is located between various towns and municipalities, and serves much of the surrounding area. Mira Sintra-Meleças operates as a terminus of Lisbon CP urban service, with trains reversing at this station to travel back towards Lisbon.

Regional and InterRegional services stop at Mira Sintra-Meleças Station roughly eight times daily in each direction.

Urban trains stop at Mira Sintra-Meleças Station at approximately 1-hour intervals on weekends and off-peak periods on weekdays. During peak periods, trains stop at Mira Sintra-Meleças Station at approximately 30-minute intervals.

== Station layout ==
A pharmacy is located inside the station, and bus service is provided by a loop on the east side of the station.

=== Platforms ===
Mira Sintra-Meleças Station is composed of two island platforms serving four tracks.

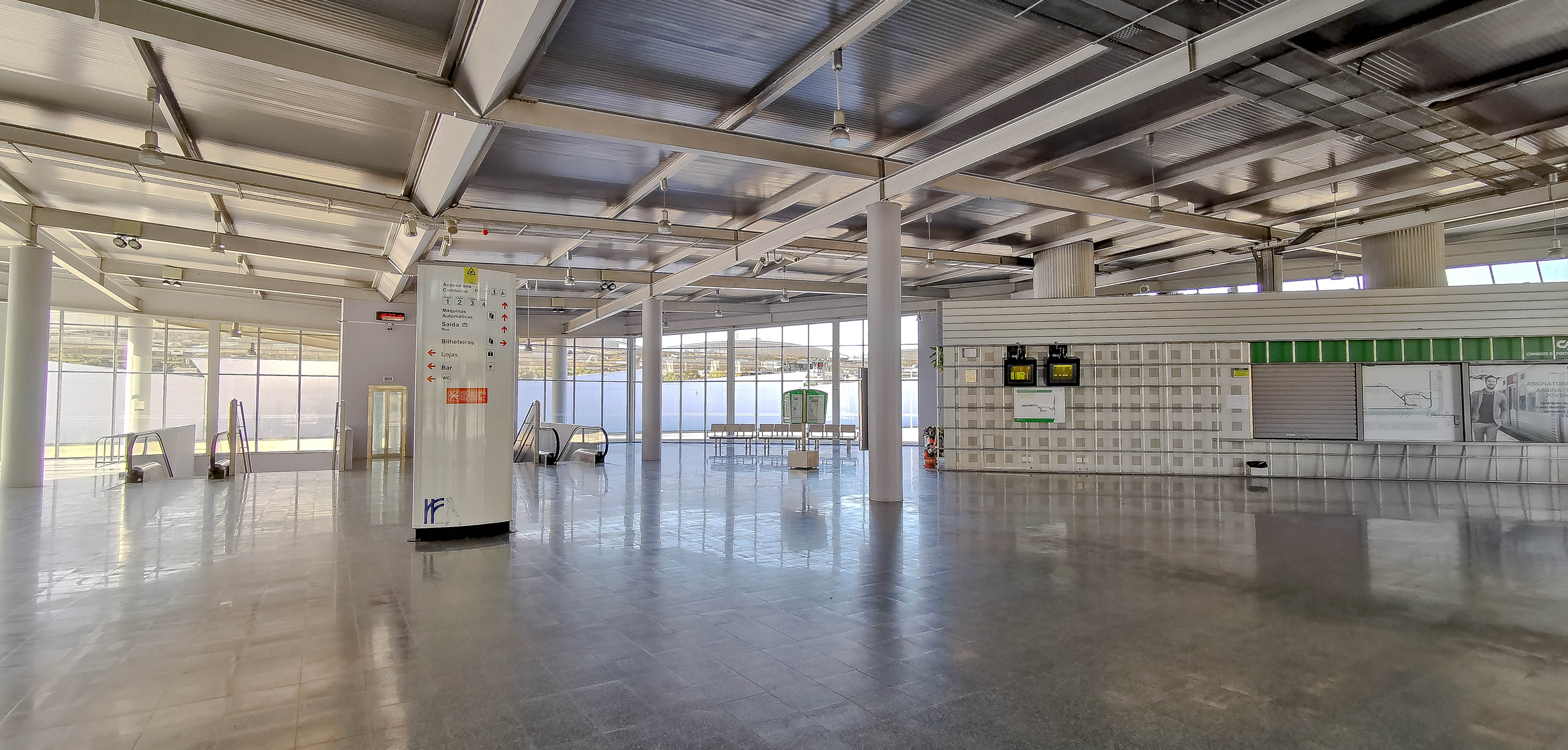
The main station atrium, January 2020

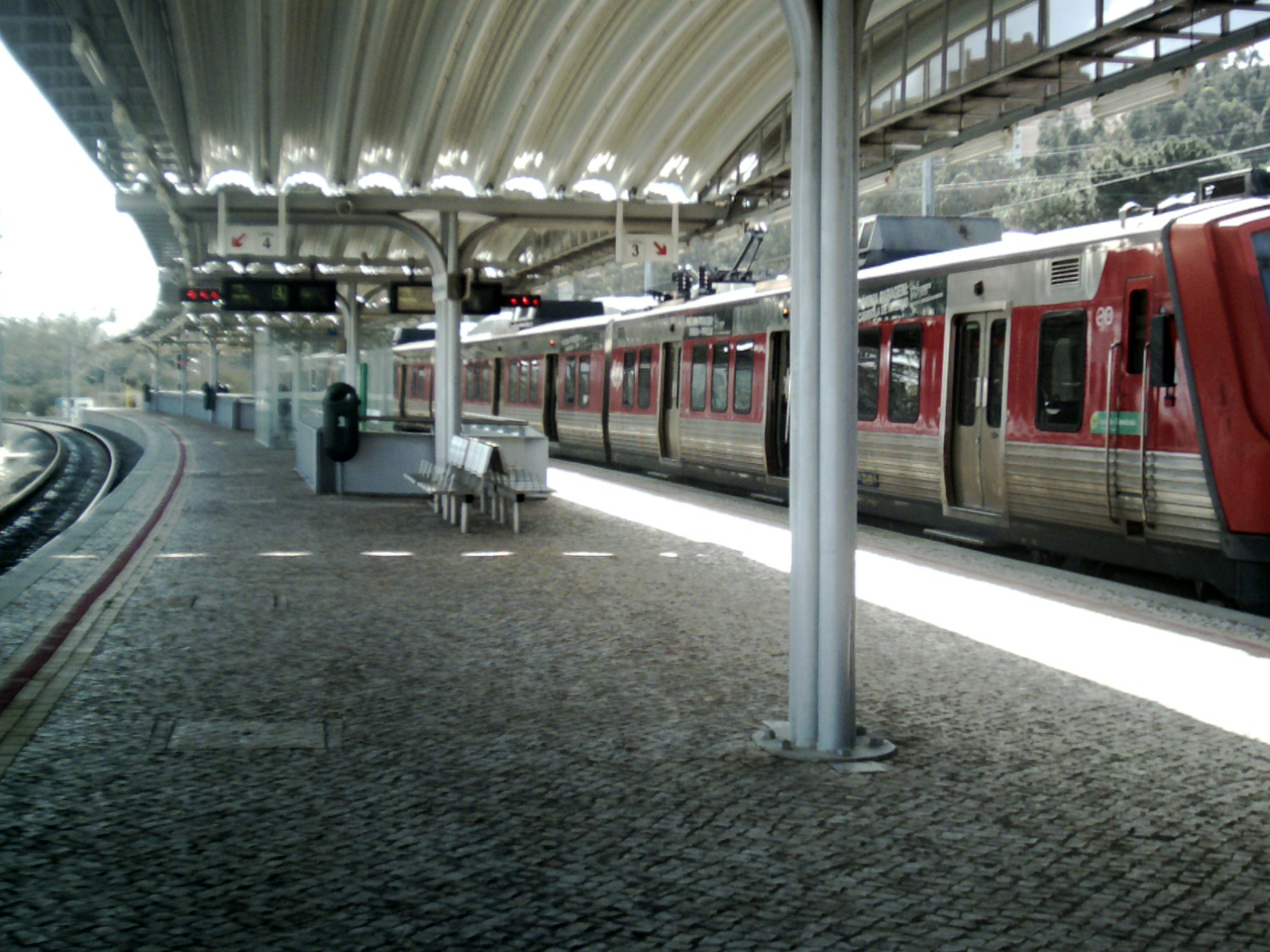
Platforms 3 and 4, December 2006

== History ==
The section of the Linha do Oeste that the station lies on entered service on 21 May 1887. A halt under the name of Meleças provided service to the area. Plans to create a proper station in the area formed in the 1990s. Mira Sintra-Meleças Station opened for revenue service on 29 November 2004. The station cost over €10 billion to build.

== Surrounding area ==
- Park Rinchoa-Fitares
