= Linha do Leste =

Portuguese railway line

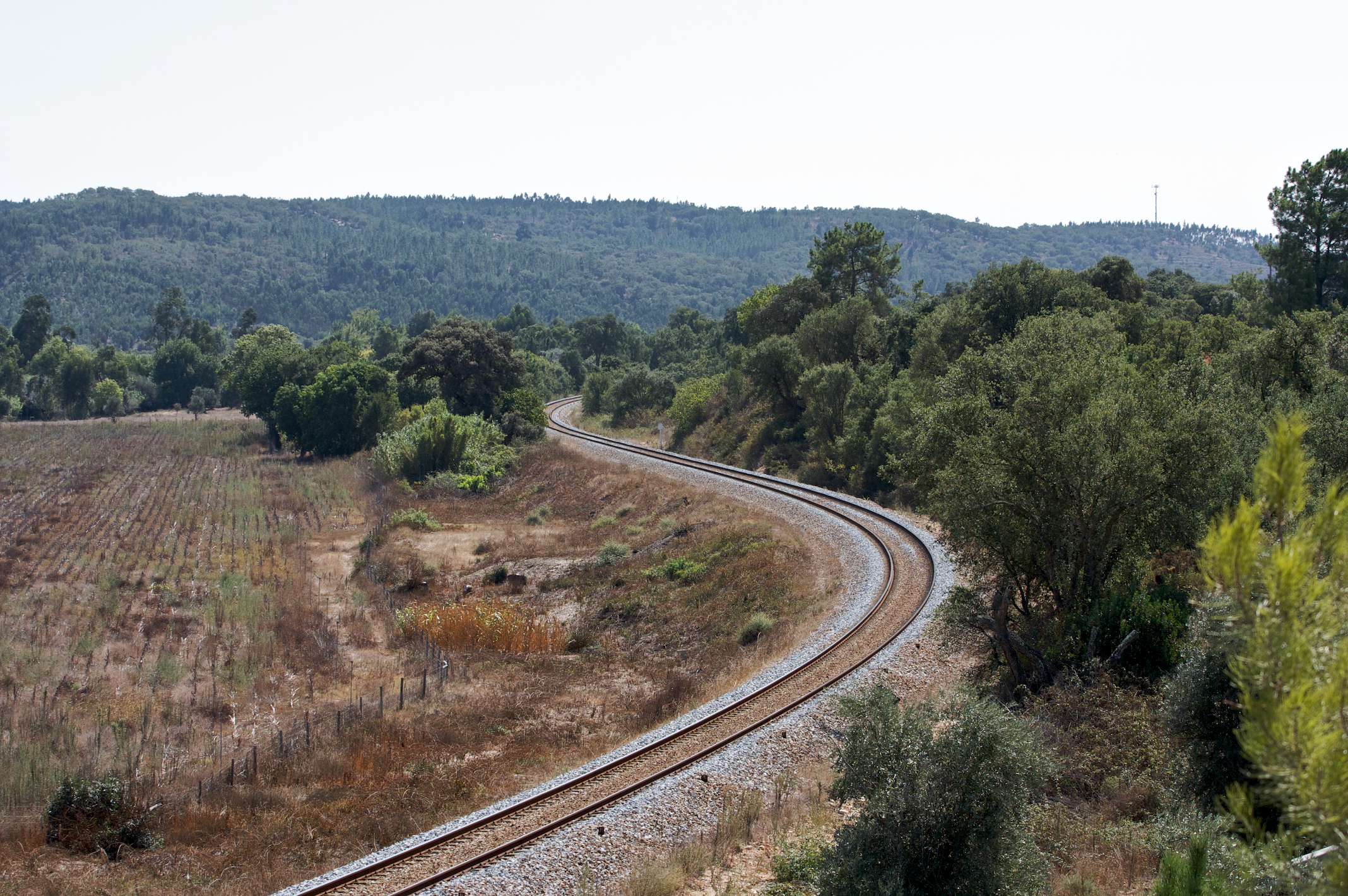
- Linha do Leste in Bemposta.

Overview
- Status: Operational
- Owner: Infraestruturas de Portugal
- Termini: Abrantes; Elvas

Technical
- Line length: 146.2 km (90.8 mi)
- Track gauge: 1,668 mm (5 ft 5 21/32 in) Iberian gauge

Location on the network
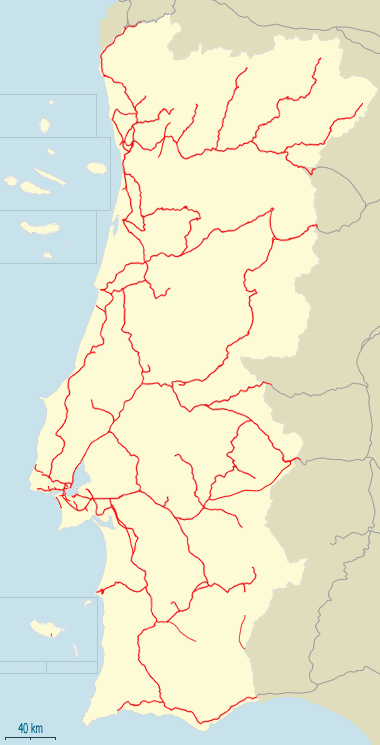

+ Abrantes × Badajoz (🔎)

Linha do Leste is a Portuguese railway line which connects Abrantes railway station to the border with Spain, near to Elvas. The connection to Spain was opened on 24 September 1863.

== See also ==
- List of railway lines in Portugal
- List of Portuguese locomotives and railcars
- History of rail transport in Portugal
