= Roma-Areeiro railway station =

Railway station in Lisbon, Portugal

Roma-Areeiro
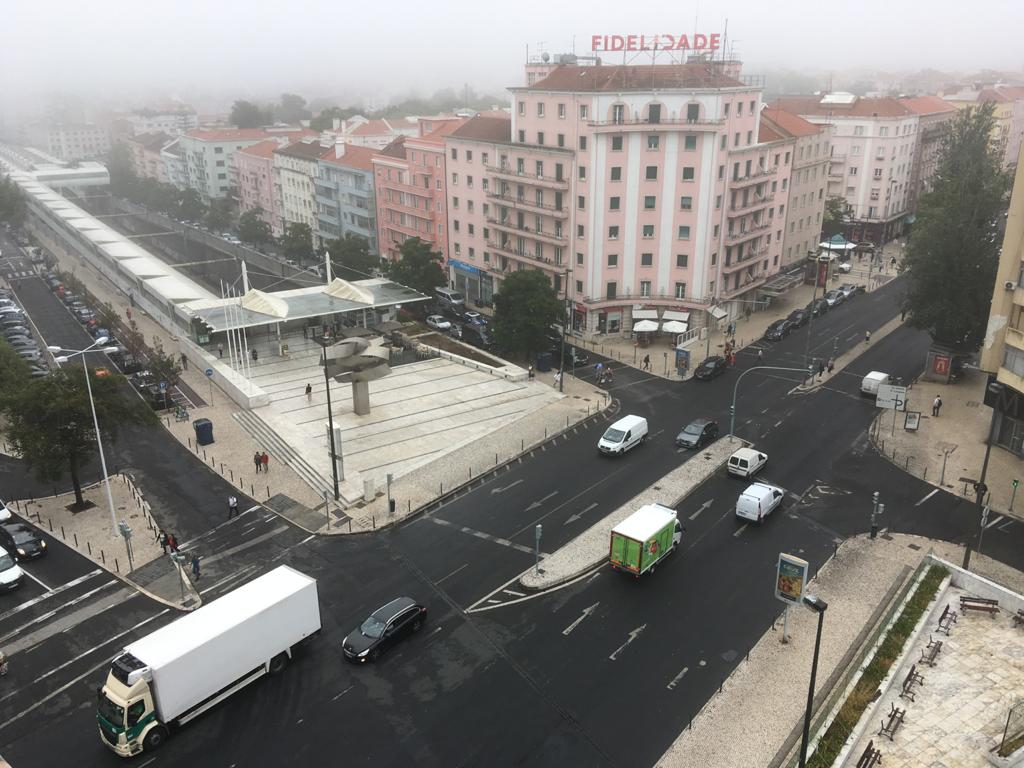
- View of the Avenida de Roma south of Roma-Areeiro Station, April 2020

General information
- Location: 1000-278 Lisbon; Portugal
- Coordinates: 38°44′45″N 9°8′8″W
- Elevation: 80 m (260 ft)
- Operator: Lisbon CP; Fertagus
- Manager: Infraestruturas de Portugal
- Line: Cintura Line
- Distance: 7.0 km from Alcântara-Terra
- Platforms: 2 side platforms + 1 island platform
- Tracks: 4
- Connections: Roma, Areeiro

History
- Opened: 20 May 1888

Services
Preceding station	Lisbon CP	Following station
Entrecampos towards Sintra	Sintra Line	Braço de Prata towards Oriente
Entrecampos towards Sintra	Sintra Line	Braço de Prata towards Alverca
Entrecampos towards Alcântara-Terra	Azambuja Line	Marvila towards Castanheira do Ribatejo
Entrecampos towards Alcântara-Terra	Azambuja Line Limited service	Marvila towards Azambuja
Preceding station	Fertagus	Following station
Entrecampos towards Coina or Setúbal	Linha do Sul (Fertagus)	Terminus
Location

Roma-Areeiro Station (Portuguese: Estação Ferroviária de Roma-Areeiro) is a railway station located in the city of Lisbon. It is served by the Sintra and Azambuja Lines, as well as the private operator Fertagus. It is managed by Infraestruturas de Portugal.

== Service ==
Trains stop at Roma-Areeiro Station at approximately 30-minute intervals on weekends and off-peak periods on weekdays. During peak periods, trains stop at Roma-Areeiro Station at approximately 10-minute intervals.

== Station layout ==
Roma-Areeiro Station consists of two side platforms and one island platform serving four tracks.

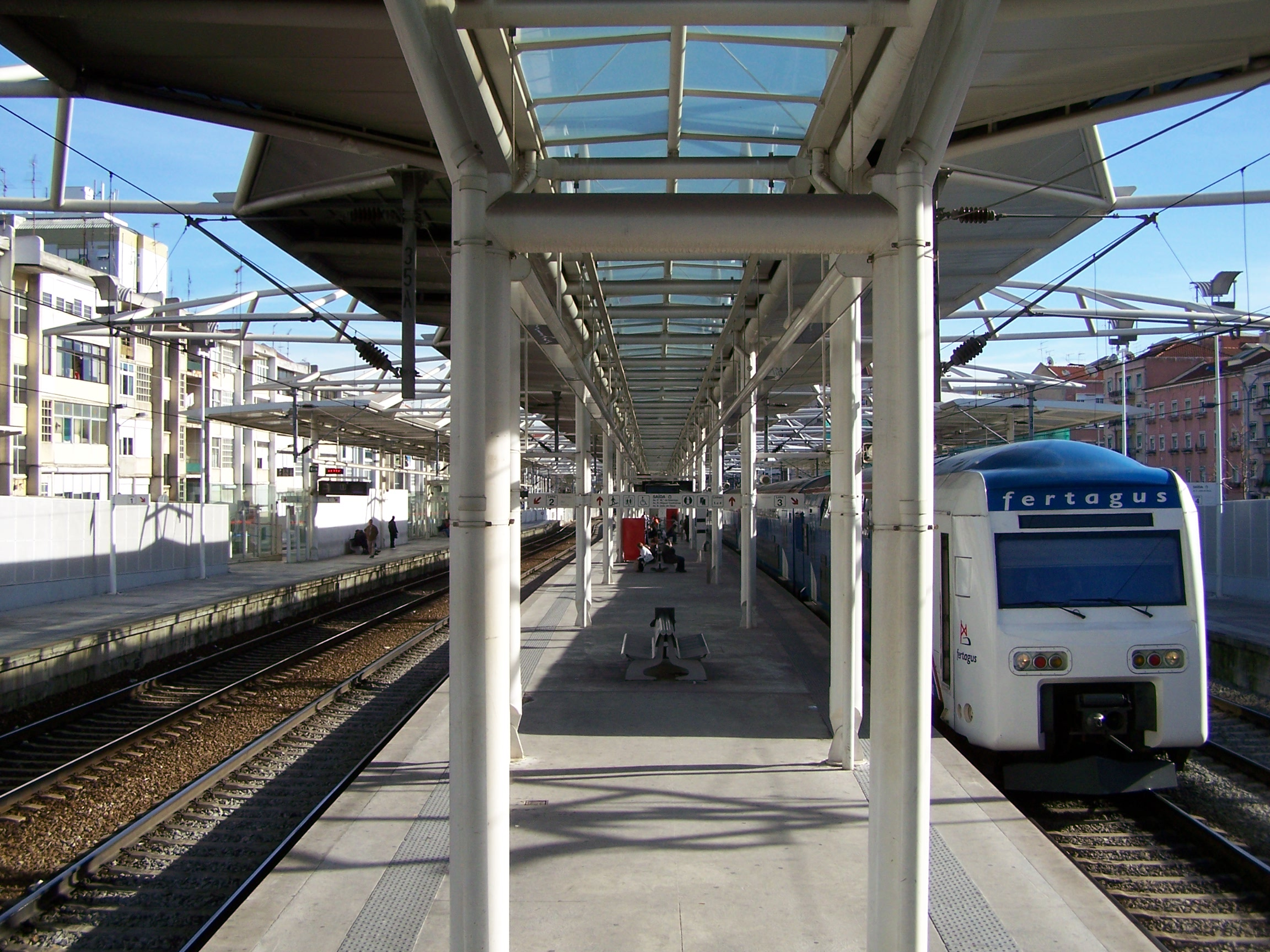
The Fertagus terminal, January 2008

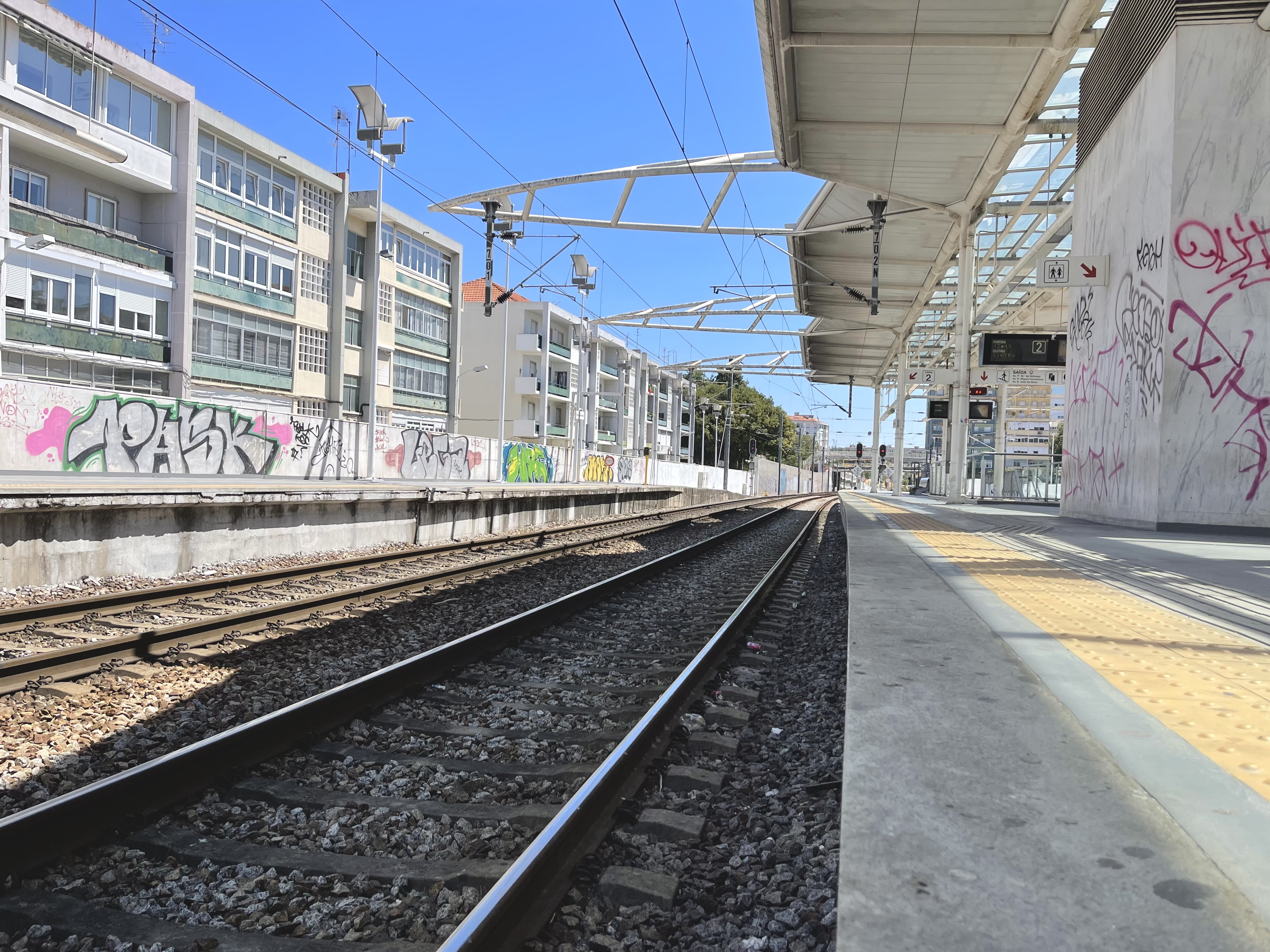
The northern platforms of Roma-Areeiro Station, August 2021

== History ==
Roma-Areeiro Station opened on 20 May 1888 on the Cintura Line between Benfica and Santa Apolónia. Roma-Areeiro Station became the terminus of all Fertagus trains from 2003.

== Surrounding area ==
- The Alvalade and Areeiro districts
- Avenida de Roma
