= Marvila station =

Railway station in Lisbon, Portugal

Marvila

General information
- Location: 1950 Lisbon; Portugal
- Coordinates: 38°44′20.73″N 9°6′31.34″W
- Elevation: 40 metres (130 ft)
- Operator: Lisbon CP
- Manager: Infraestruturas de Portugal
- Line: Cintura Line
- Distance: 9.7 kilometres (6.0 mi) from Alcântara-Terra
- Platforms: 2 side platforms
- Tracks: 2
- Train operators: Comboios de Portugal

Construction
- Structure type: At-grade

History
- Opened: 5 September 1891

Services
Preceding station	Lisbon CP	Following station
Roma-Areeiro towards Alcântara-Terra	Azambuja Line	Braço de Prata towards Castanheira do Ribatejo
Roma-Areeiro towards Alcântara-Terra	Azambuja Line Limited service	Braço de Prata towards Azambuja
Location

Marvila station (Note: Translated as Marvila station on the Comboios de Portugal website.) (Portuguese: Apeadeiro de Marvila) is a station on the Cintura Line in the city of Lisbon, Portugal, serving the parish of Marvila. It offers service to the Azambuja Line.

== Service ==
Marvila station is used by suburban trains during weekdays, operated by Comboios de Portugal. Trains operating through service to the Sintra Line always bypass this stop.

== Station layout ==
Marvila station is composed of two side platforms serving two tracks.

== History ==
Marvila station entered service on 5 September 1891. It was previously spelled as Marvilla.

== Surrounding area ==
- Marvila Library
- Clube Ferroviário de Portugal Soccer Field
