= Quinta das Torres halt =

Former Railway station in Portugal

Quinta das Torres

General information
- Location: Vila Franca de Xira; Portugal
- Coordinates: 38°56′34″N 8°59′43″W
- Elevation: 6 m (20 ft)
- Line: Northern line (1936-2009)

History
- Opened: After 1936
- Closed: 2009
Location
- Location within Portugal

The Quinta das Torres halt (Portuguese: Apeadeiro de Quinta das Torres) was a railway interface on the Northern line, which served the local navy school in the municipality of Vila Franca de Xira, in Portugal. It was served by the Azambuja line of the Lisbon suburban train network.

== History ==
This interface was part of the section between Santa Apolónia and Carregado on the Norte line, which opened on September 28, 1856. On January 9, 1936, the Ministry of Planning approved a draft notice to the public regarding its opening, with the status of a halt. In 1985 this interface was described as having two platforms (usual for a station on a double track line), with no passenger building. It ceased to appear on the Azambuja line timetable on December 13, 2009, because its operation was no longer justified after the closure of the Navy school.
