= Braço de Prata railway station =

Railway station in Lisbon, Portugal

Braço de Prata
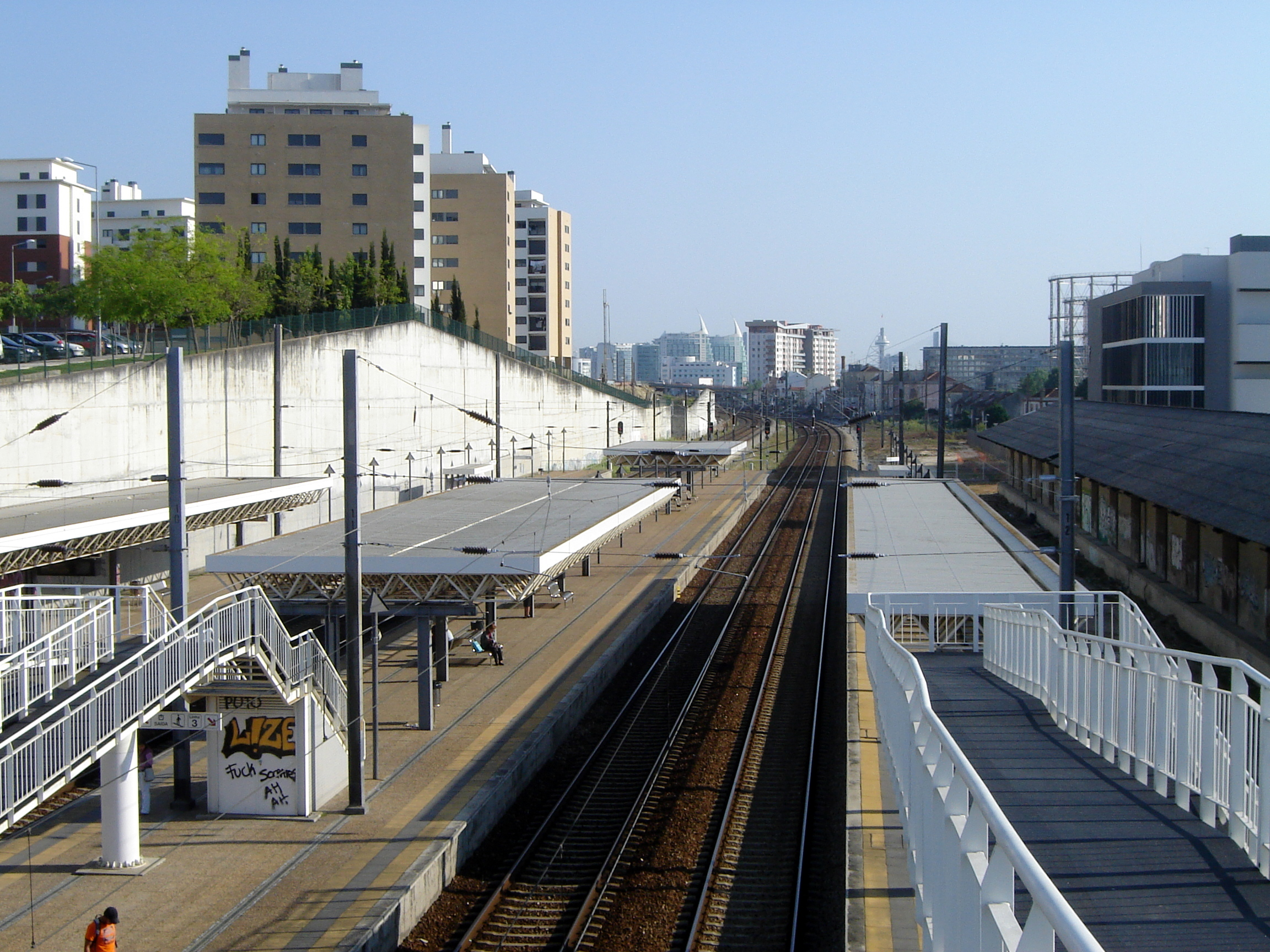
- View of the station from above, May 2011

General information
- Location: Lisbon; Portugal
- Coordinates: 38°44′47.95″N 9°6′10.95″W
- Elevation: 30 m (98 ft)
- Owner: Infraestruturas de Portugal
- Lines: Norte Line; Cintura Line
- Platforms: 2 side platforms + 1 island platform
- Tracks: 4
- Train operators: Comboios de Portugal

History
- Opened: 16 August 1902

Services
Preceding station	Comboios de Portugal	Following station
Lisbon-Santa Apolónia Terminus	Regional Limited service	Lisbon-Oriente towards Entroncamento
Lisbon-Santa Apolónia Terminus	Regional Limited service	Lisbon-Oriente towards Porto-Campanhã
Lisbon-Santa Apolónia Terminus	Regional Limited service	Lisbon-Oriente towards Castelo Branco
Preceding station	Lisbon CP	Following station
Roma-Areeiro towards Sintra	Sintra Line	Oriente Terminus
Roma-Areeiro towards Sintra	Sintra Line	Oriente towards Alverca
Marvila towards Alcântara-Terra	Azambuja Line	Oriente towards Castanheira do Ribatejo
Marvila towards Alcântara-Terra	Azambuja Line Limited service	Oriente towards Azambuja
Santa Apolónia Terminus	Azambuja Line	Oriente towards Azambuja
Location

Braço de Prata Railway Station (Portuguese: Estação Ferroviária de Braço de Prata) is a railway station on the Cintura Line in the city of Lisbon, Portugal. The station serves as the junction between the Norte Line and the Cintura Line.

== Services ==
The station is used by suburban trains of the Sintra and Azambuja lines, as well as limited night regional services, operated by Comboios de Portugal. Suburban trains stop at Braço de Prata at roughly 10-minute intervals during the weekday peak, 15-minute intervals during the weekday off-peak, and 20-minute intervals on weekends.

== Station layout ==
The station is composed of two side platforms and an island platform serving a total of four tracks.

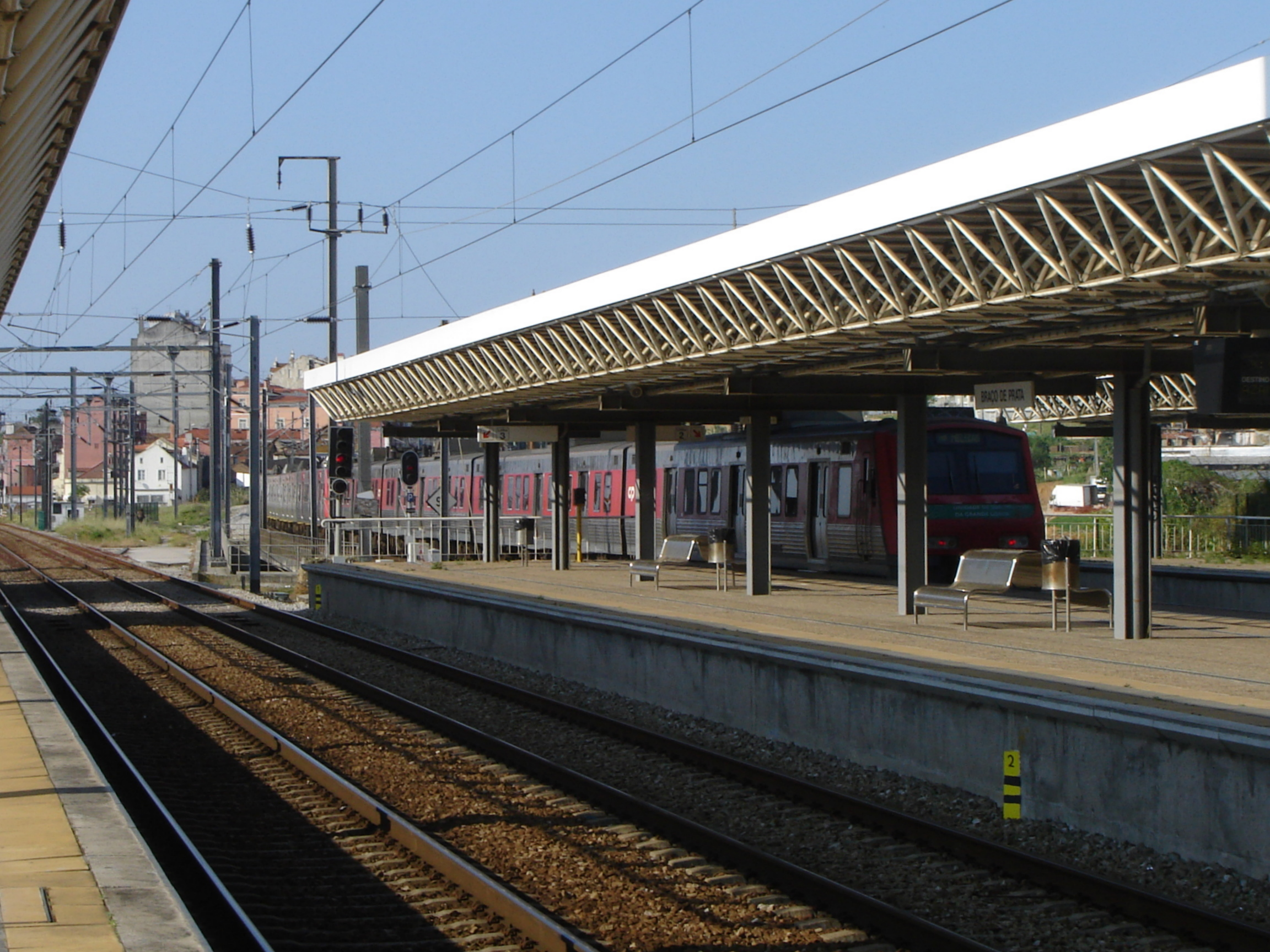
A consist of two CP Class 2300/2400 units leaving towards the Cintura Line, May 2011

== History ==
Braço de Prata Station opened on 16 August 1902.

== Surrounding area ==
- Fábrica do Braço de Prata
