= General Torres railway station =

Railway station in Vila Nova de Gaia, Portugal

General Torres
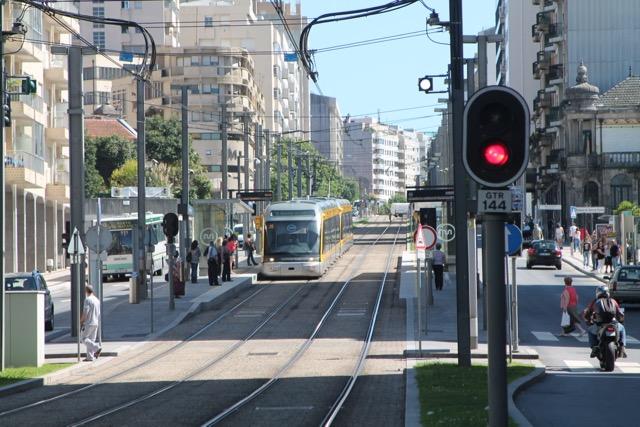
- The General Torres stop of the Metro do Porto

General information
- Location: Vila Nova de Gaia
- Coordinates: 41°7′59.26″N 8°36′33.02″W
- Line: Linha do Norte
- Tracks: 4
Location

General Torres railway station is a station on the Linha do Norte, a railway line that connects the cities of Lisbon and Porto in Portugal. It is situated in the municipality of Vila Nova de Gaia, next to the Rua General Torres that gives it its name. The station is principally served by suburban trains of the Porto network of CP Urban Services.

General Torres railway station is some 100 metres (330 ft) from the General Torres station on the Porto Metro light rail line D.
