= Gare do Oriente =

Train station in Lisbon, Portugal

Lisboa-Oriente
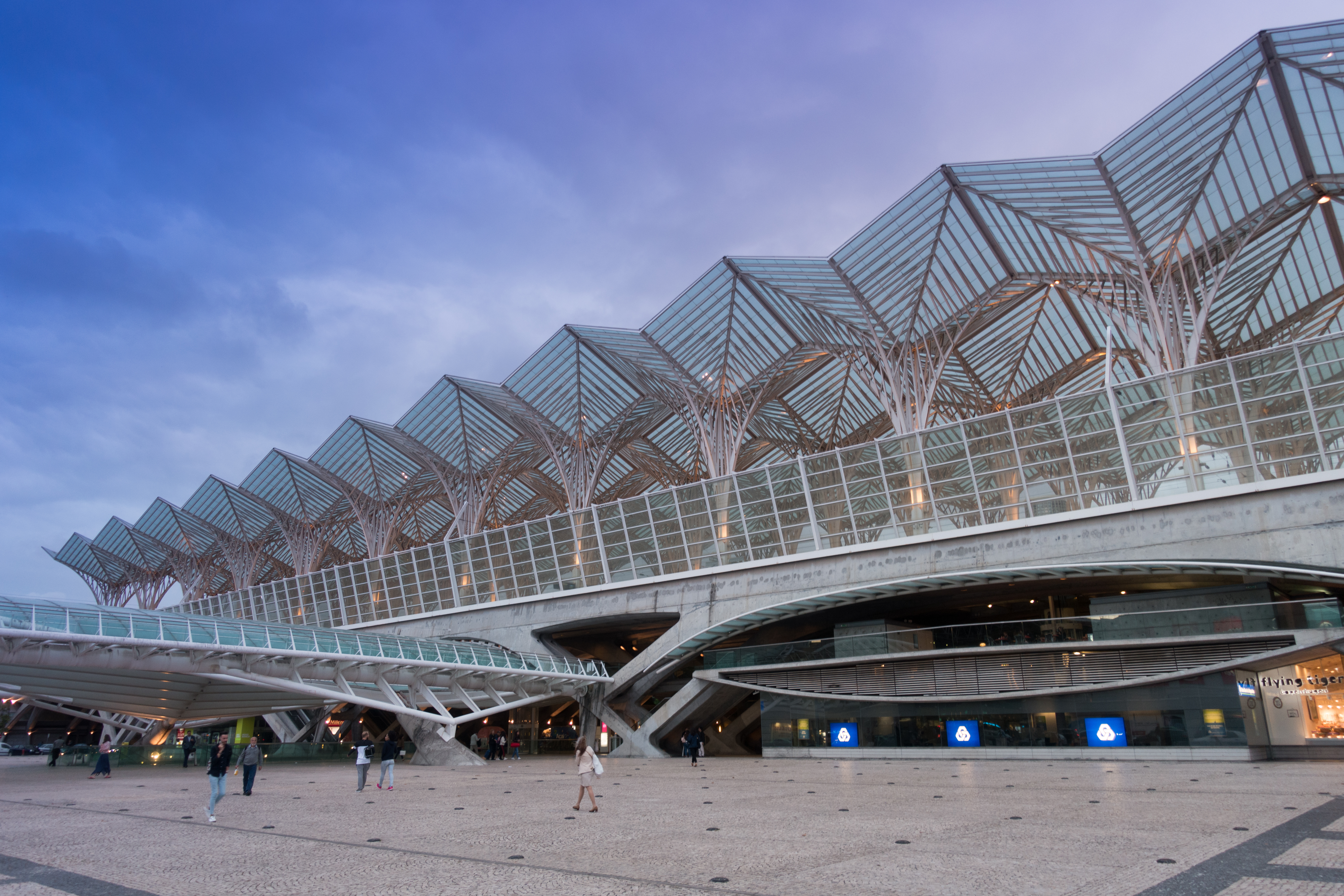

General information
- Location: Parque das Nações; Lisbon; Portugal
- Coordinates: 38°46′4″N 9°5′57″W
- Owner: Infraestruturas de Portugal
- Connections: Oriente

Construction
- Architect: Santiago Calatrava

History
- Opened: 1998

Services
Preceding station	Comboios de Portugal	Following station
Lisbon-Santa Apolónia Terminus	Alfa Pendular	Santarém towards Braga
Lisbon-Entrecampos towards Faro	Alfa Pendular	Coimbra-B towards Porto-Campanhã
Lisbon-Entrecampos towards Faro	Intercidades	Terminus
Lisbon-Santa Apolónia Terminus	Intercidades	Vila Franca de Xira towards Braga
Lisbon-Santa Apolónia Terminus	Intercidades	Vila Franca de Xira towards Guimarães
Lisbon-Santa Apolónia Terminus	Intercidades	Vila Franca de Xira towards Valença
Lisbon-Santa Apolónia Terminus	Intercidades	Vila Franca de Xira towards Porto-Campanhã
Lisbon-Santa Apolónia Terminus	Intercidades via B. Alta	Vila Franca de Xira towards Guarda
Lisbon-Santa Apolónia Terminus	Intercidades via B. Baixa	Vila Franca de Xira towards Guarda
Lisbon-Entrecampos towards Évora	Intercidades	Terminus
Other services
Preceding station	Comboios de Portugal	Following station
Lisbon-Santa Apolónia Terminus	InterRegional	Vila Franca de Xira towards Tomar
Lisbon-Santa Apolónia Terminus	InterRegional	Vila Franca de Xira towards Porto-Campanhã
Lisbon-Santa Apolónia Terminus	Regional	Póvoa towards Entroncamento
Lisbon-Santa Apolónia Terminus	Regional	Póvoa towards Tomar
Braço de Prata towards Lisbon-Santa Apolónia	Regional	Vila Franca de Xira towards Castelo Branco
Braço de Prata towards Lisbon-Santa Apolónia	Regional (R3400)	Moscavide towards Porto-Campanhã
Preceding station	Lisbon CP	Following station
Braço de Prata towards Sintra	Sintra Line	Terminus
Braço de Prata towards Sintra	Sintra Line	Moscavide towards Alverca
Braço de Prata towards Alcântara-Terra	Azambuja Line	Moscavide towards Castanheira do Ribatejo
Braço de Prata towards Santa Apolónia	Azambuja Line	Moscavide towards Azambuja
Braço de Prata towards Alcântara-Terra	Azambuja Line Limited service	Moscavide towards Azambuja
Location
- Location within Lisbon

Gare do Oriente (Portuguese pronunciation: [ˈɡaɾɨ ðu oɾiˈẽtɨ]), also known as Oriente Station (Portuguese: Estação Oriente or Estação do Oriente) or Lisbon Oriente Station (lit. Lisbon East Station), is an intermodal transport hub situated in the civil parish of Parque das Nações, in Lisbon. It includes a train station serving regional and intercity services, a metro station and a bus terminal serving local and long-distance routes.

== History ==
In 1994, the station was proposed as part of the modernization of the Linha do Norte, a modification to the rail line to facilitate the future development of a new station in eastern Lisbon. Located along Avenida D. João II, over Avenida de Berlim and Rua Conselheiro Mariano de Carvalho, the station was planned to occupy the lands once occupied by Apeadeiro dos Olivais, which was demolished in the 1990s in order to make way for the new station.

Bids for building the project on lands to be used for the 1998 exposition were solicited internationally. The concept was originally designed by Spanish architect Santiago Calatrava in 1995, and built by Necso.

The station was inaugurated on 19 May 1998, as part of the celebrations marking the opening of the Expo '98 world's fair. At the time of its opening it was considered the largest intermodal station in Portugal, winning the Brunel Award on 7 October 1998, in the category of large new construction projects.

== Architecture ==
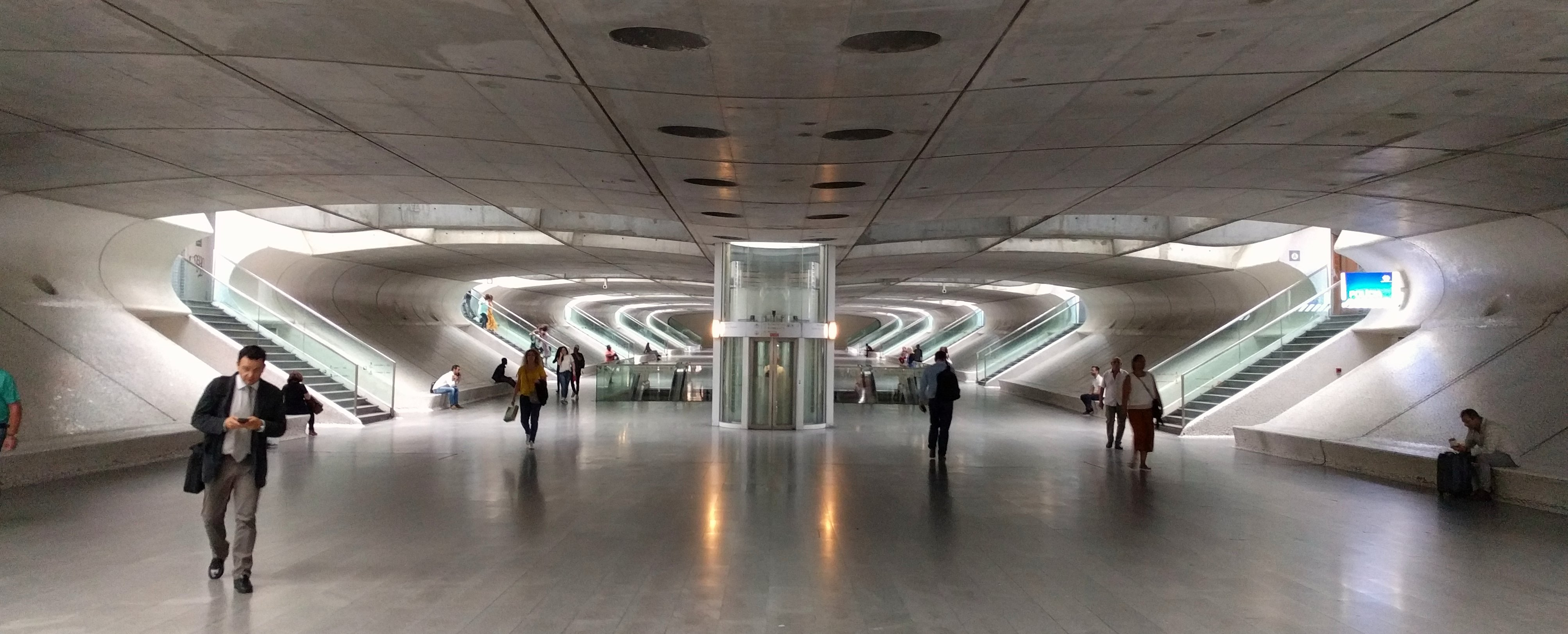
Interior

Oriente Station is situated in an urban area of reclaimed industrial and abandoned buildings fronting the northern margin of the Tagus River, situated 6 kilometres (3.7 mi) from the city centre.

Ambitious in its conception, the modernist station includes a Lisbon Metro station, a high-speed commuter and regional train hub, a local, national and international bus station, a shopping centre and a police station. The rail station was conceived with a multi-modal platform intersecting the cardinal axes for the various transport modes.

With some influence from Gothic architecture, the station bears considerable resemblance to Santiago Calatrava's earlier Allen Lambert Galleria within Toronto's Brookfield Place. Calatrava's objective was to realize a new space with ample room and functionality providing multiple connections between various zones in the metropolitan area of Lisbon.

One important aspect of the station is its link to the urban environment in which it was constructed. The decision to elevate the rail line, for example, eliminated a physical barrier between the city and the Tagus River margin. The station, covered in a lattice structure of glass and metal, is constructed of reinforced concrete and raised 19 metres (62 ft) over the roadway. By January 2011, there were eight lines that extended 510–720 metres (1,670–2,360 ft) across 309 metres (1,014 ft) platforms, between 60–70 centimetres (24–28 in) in height.

In addition to the many galleries that are part of the station, it is connected to the Centro Comercial Vasco da Gama (Vasco da Gama Commercial Centre/Mall) and the Lisbon Metro through a subterranean access, as well as a first floor connection to the train platforms and a pedestrian walkway.

== Services ==
Preceding station	Comboios de Portugal	Following station
Braço de Prata toward Lisboa-Santa Apolónia	Regional; R4401	Moscavide toward Entroncamento
