= Santa Apolónia railway station =

Railway station in Portugal

Lisboa Santa Apolónia
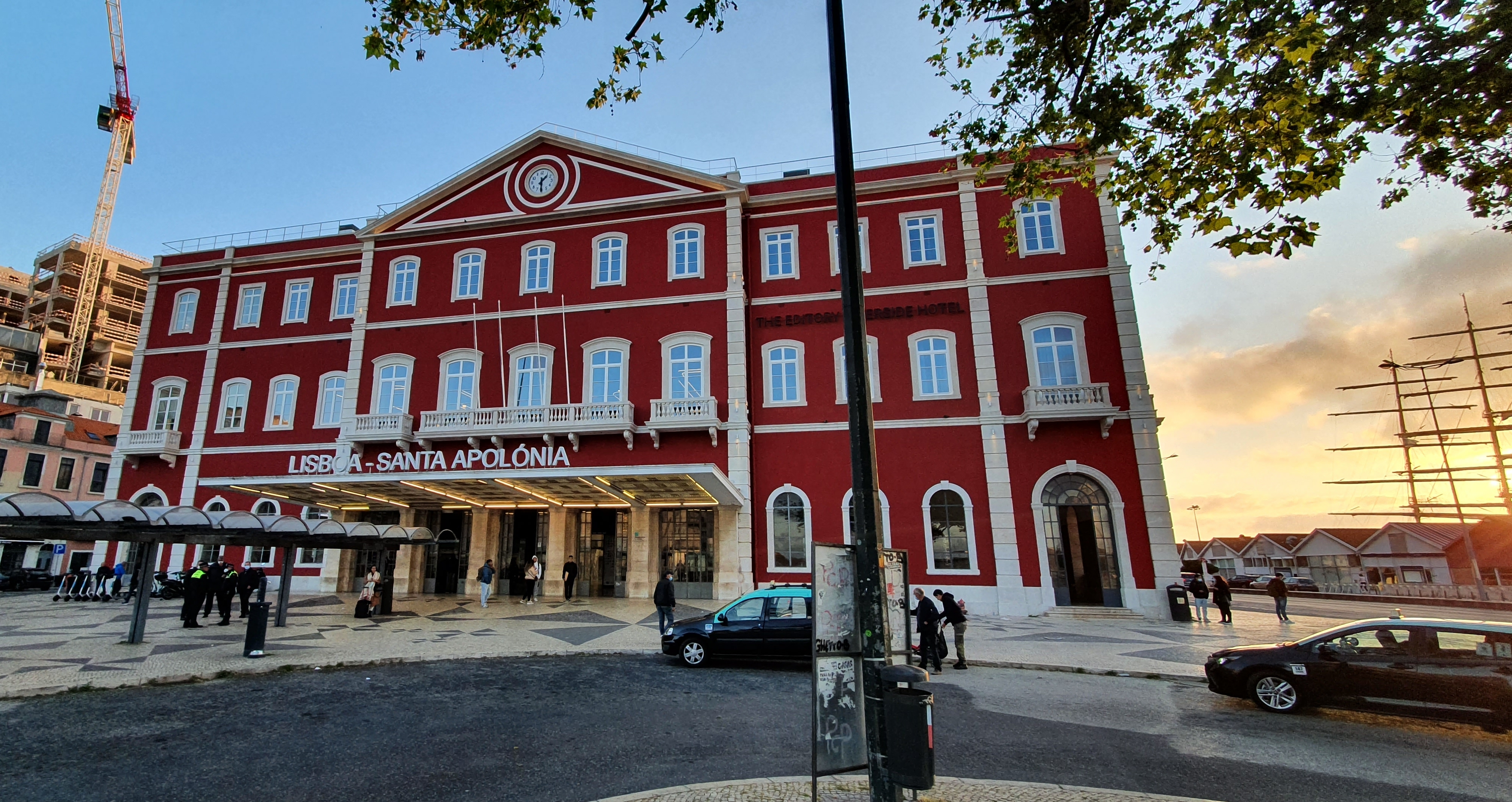

General information
- Location: Avenida Infante Dom Henrique 1; 1100-105 LISBOA; Portugal
- Operator: Lisbon CP CP
- Connections: Santa Apolónia

History
- Opened: 28 October 1856
Location

The Santa Apolónia Station is the oldest railway terminus in Portugal. It is situated in the civil parish of São Vicente, in the central part of the municipality of Lisbon, on the northern margin of the Tagus River in the historical district of Alfama.

== History ==
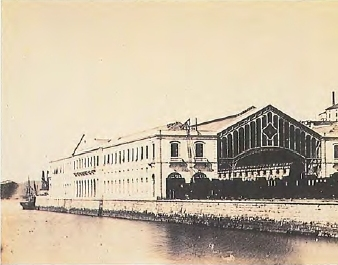
A 19th century view of the Santa Apolónia station

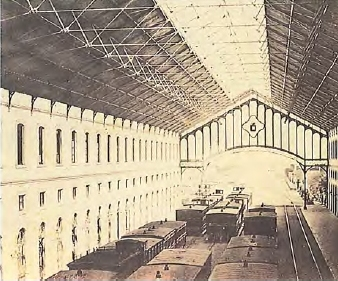
The interior of the main platforms at Santa Apolónia

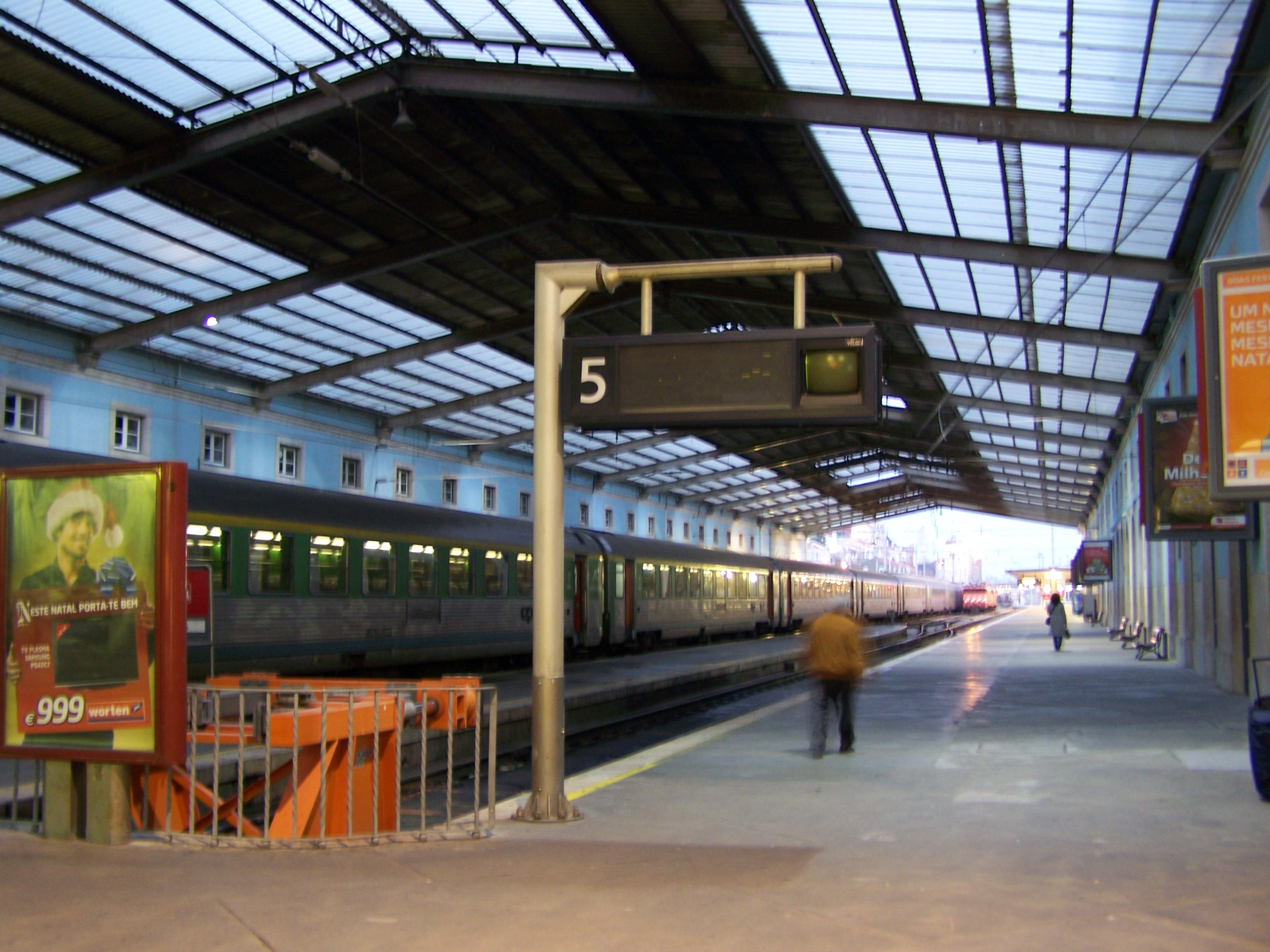
A 20th century view of the Santa Apolónia station

In December 1844, under the initiative of José Bernardo da Costa Cabral, the Companhia das Obras Públicas was founded, with the purpose of constructing a rail line between Lisbon and Spain, in addition to intermodal station between rail and maritime services. The station was known as the Cais da América or Cais da Europa, and allowed rail passengers from Europe to offload to ships for America.

The initial project was for the construction at the Cais dos Soldados (Soldiers Wharf). Meanwhile, in December 1852, the engineer Thomaz Rumball proposed two alternatives, alongside the Museu Militar de Lisboa (Military Museum of Lisbon), or in the proximity of the Largo do Intendente. Another engineer, Harcourt White, also rejected the option of Cais dos Soldades in January 1853, because the location was too small to construct a station. He suggested that the station be situated along the river, after the Church of Anjos in Xabregas, where at the time there was free space. An executive committee was nominated to plan the construction of the Lisbon station, proposing the construction of a building along Rocha do Conde de Óbidos, with the capacity to receive passengers and commerce, with one of the lines continuing to area around the customs house in Terreiro do Paço. The construction project to Spain, therefore, began this year, under orders of Fontes Pereira de Melo,

The actual project to construct the station at Cais dos Soldados was approved by the government on 8 March 1854. The plan presented a station that included distinctive elements for commercial and passenger traffic, repair workshops, warehouses and services. For the passenger terminal, the government acquired the old Convent of Santa Apolónia, but the former army arsenal in the location was demolished to make way for the final design. From the beginning, the rail line and the commercial wharf required that land be reclaimed along the Tagus River.

At the inauguration of the first link of the Caminho de Ferro do Leste (Eastern line), between Carregado and Lisbon, on 28 September 1856, the construction of the station had not already begun. In the meantime, the terminal was installed in the provisionary building along the Palácio de Coimbra (Palace of Coimbra).

The project was designed by Angel Arribas Ugarte, and directed by director João Evangelista de Abreu, and his chief engineer Lecrenier, and constructed by the company Oppermann. The station was inaugurated on 1 May 1865, with the first line to the station beginning operation in 1873, to connect Santa Apolónia to Santos.

Between 1891 and 1957 most passenger services at Santa Apolónia moved to Rossio Train Station, then referred to as the Central Station. Santa Apolonia became one of several land transport hubs, that included Gare do Oriente, situated 6.5 kilometres (4.0 mi) northeast, Cais do Sodré, Rossio and Entrecampos.

From the 20th century, the national rail service Comboios de Portugal has operated different suburban, national and international routes (including links to Paris and Madrid, including the high-speed Alfa Pendular service. Santa Apolónia rail station is connected to the Lisbon Metro station of the same name, which opened in 2007. In January 2011, there were six means of transit, between 250–355 metres (820–1,165 ft) length; the platforms were between 172–348 metres (564–1,142 ft), and a height of 60–70 centimetres (24–28 in).

== Architecture ==
Santa Apolónia
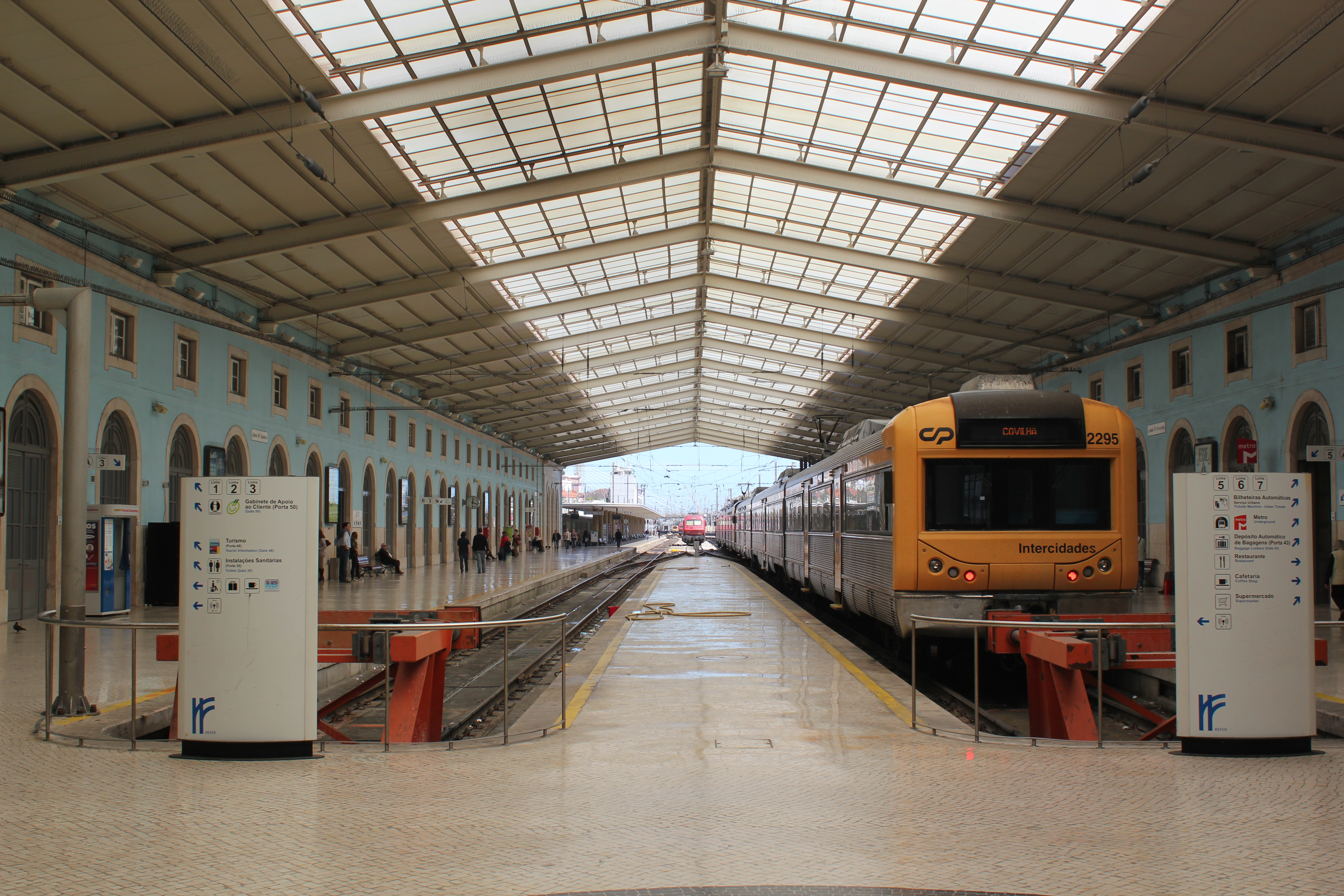
- Intercidades (intercity) transport on the platform

General information
- Location: Santa Apolónia; Avenida Infante Dom Henrique 73; 1100 LISBOA; São Vicente; Portugal
- System: Intermodal station
- Operator: Comboios de Portugal
- Lines: Norte line Xabregas direct curve
- Platforms: 4 tracks with 40 cm-high platforms and 2 tracks with 90 cm-high platforms
- Tracks: 7 (one of which is a platform-less run-round loop)
- Train operators: Comboios de Portugal, Lisbon Metro
- Connections: Lisbon Metro ( Santa Apolónia), Bus, Taxi

Construction
- Accessible: Station without architectural barriers, Ramp/lift for train access, Accessible toilets

Services
Preceding station	Comboios de Portugal	Following station
Terminus	Alfa Pendular	Lisbon-Oriente towards Braga
Terminus	Intercidades via B. Alta	Lisbon-Oriente towards Guarda
Terminus	Intercidades via B. Baixa	Lisbon-Oriente towards Guarda
Terminus	Intercidades	Lisbon-Oriente towards Braga
Terminus	Intercidades	Lisbon-Oriente towards Guimarães
Terminus	Intercidades	Lisbon-Oriente towards Valença
Terminus	Intercidades	Lisbon-Oriente towards Porto-Campanhã
Terminus	InterRegional	Lisbon-Oriente towards Tomar
Terminus	Regional	Lisbon-Oriente towards Tomar
Terminus	Regional	Lisbon-Oriente towards Entroncamento
Terminus	Regional	Braço de Prata towards Castelo Branco
Terminus	Regional	Braço de Prata towards Entroncamento
Terminus	Regional	Braço de Prata towards Porto-Campanhã
Terminus	Regional	Entrecampos towards Caldas da Rainha
Terminus	InterRegional	Entrecampos towards Caldas da Rainha
Preceding station	Lisbon CP	Following station
Terminus	Azambuja Line	Braço de Prata towards Azambuja
Location

The station is situated along the northern margin of the Tagus River, in the Alfama district of Lisbon, integrated into the urban zone, along the Rua Caminhos de Ferro. Fronted by Rua Texeira Lopes, the three-register U-shaped building includes a short facade and long parallel wings extending around the rail platforms.

The principal symmetrical facade consists of a three-register Neoclassical, divided into five unequal veins. The first floor is dominated by five large rounded doorways, in addition to a lateral doorways on opposite ends of the facade, with rounded windows interspersed between the porticos. On the second floor are rounded windows, with the central and lateral windows much larger and with lintels. On the final floor includes a triangular pediment dominated by a clock. Similarly, the central and lateral vains include rounded windows, interlaced by square windows.

The main part of the building is dominated by a great nave, approximately 117 metres (384 ft) long, 24.6 metres (81 ft) wide and 13 metres (43 ft) tall, consisting of a lattice of wrought iron and glass, typical of the 19th century.

== Services ==
Preceding station	Comboios de Portugal	Following station
Terminus	InterRegional	Lisboa-Oriente toward Porto-Campanhã
Terminus	Lusitânia Comboio Hotel; Operated jointly with Renfe Operadora	Lisboa-Oriente toward Madrid-Chamartín
Terminus	Sud Expresso	Lisboa-Oriente toward Hendaye
