= Cintura Line =

Railway line in Portugal

Cintura line
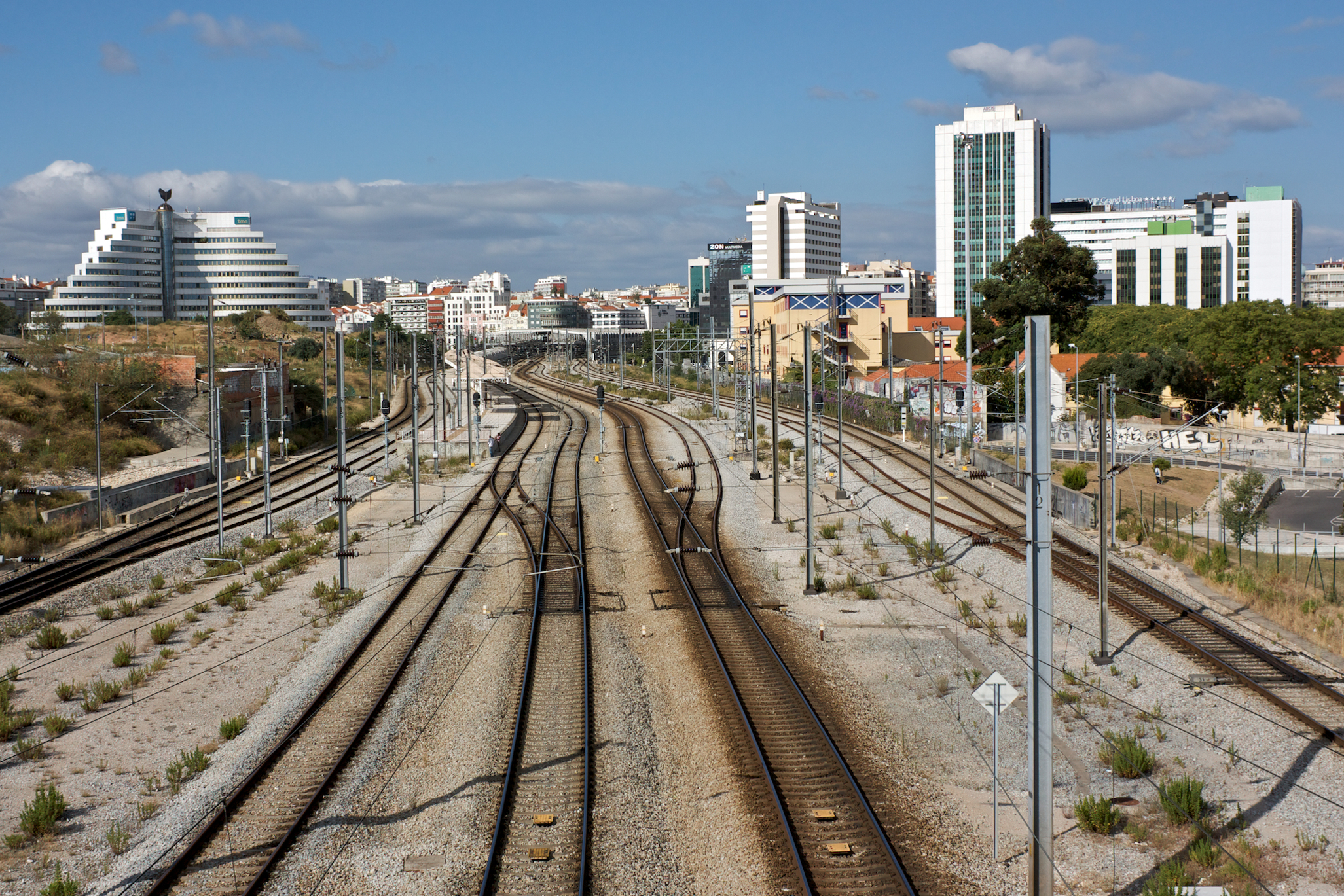
- Entrecampos railway station.

Overview
- Status: Operational
- Owner: Infraestruturas de Portugal
- Locale: Lisbon, Portugal
- Termini: Port of Lisbon; Braço de Prata
- Connecting lines: Norte line, Cascais line, Sintra line, Sul line
- Stations: 7 (1 planned)

Service
- Depot(s): Campolide Depot

Technical
- Line length: 12 km (7.5 mi)
- Number of tracks: Single-track (From Port of Lisbon to Campolide), Double-track (From Campolide to Sete-Rios, from Roma-Areeiro to Braço de Prata), and Quadruple-track (From Sete-Rios to Roma-Areeiro
- Track gauge: 1,668 mm (5 ft 5 21/32 in) Iberian gauge
- Electrification: 25 kV / 50 Hz Overhead line (from Alcântara-Terra to Braço de Prata)
Route map
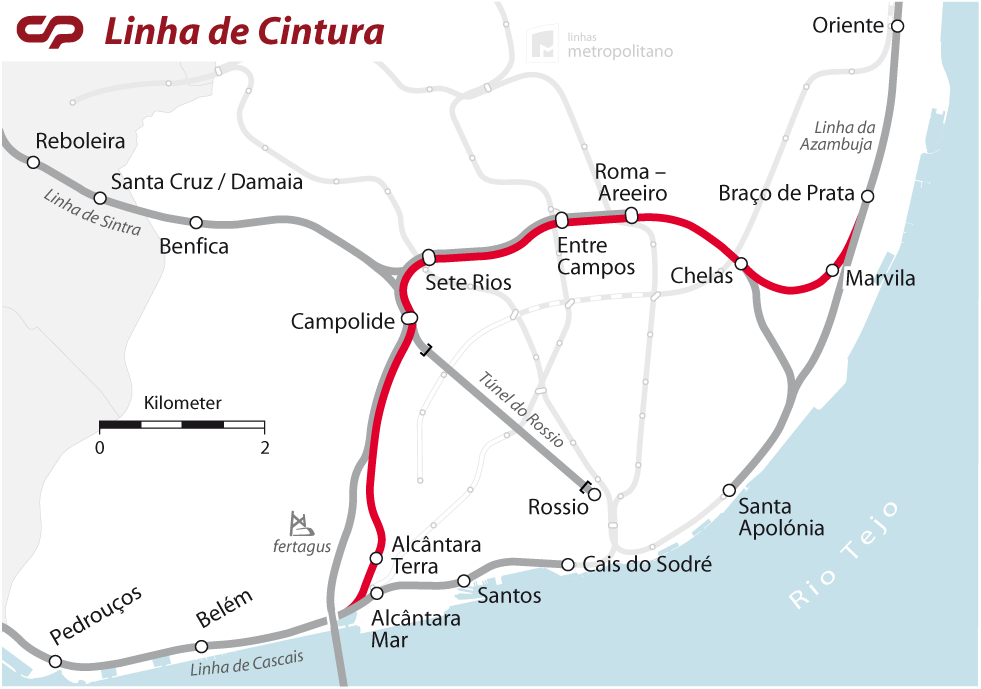

The Cintura line (Portuguese: Linha de Cintura, formerly called Linha de Circumvalação de Lisboa) is a railway line in Lisbon, Portugal. The half circle route was opened in 1888 and serves as a connection between all railway lines in Lisbon: The Cascais, Sul, Sintra, and Norte Lines. There are two railway triangles, one in Sete Rios, and another in Xabregas. It crosses all four Lisbon Metro lines, and connects to three of those at four stations.

== See also ==
- List of railway lines in Portugal
- List of Portuguese locomotives and railcars
- History of rail transport in Portugal

== Sources ==
- Reis, Francisco; Gomes, Rosa; Gomes, Gilberto (2006). Os Caminhos de Ferro Portugueses 1856–2006 (in Portuguese). Lisbon: CP – Comboios de Portugal e Público-Comunicação Social S. A. ISBN 989-619-078-X.
- "2019 Network Statement" (PDF). 7 December 2018. Archived from the original (PDF) on 12 July 2019.
