= Alfa Pendular =

HSR system in Portugal

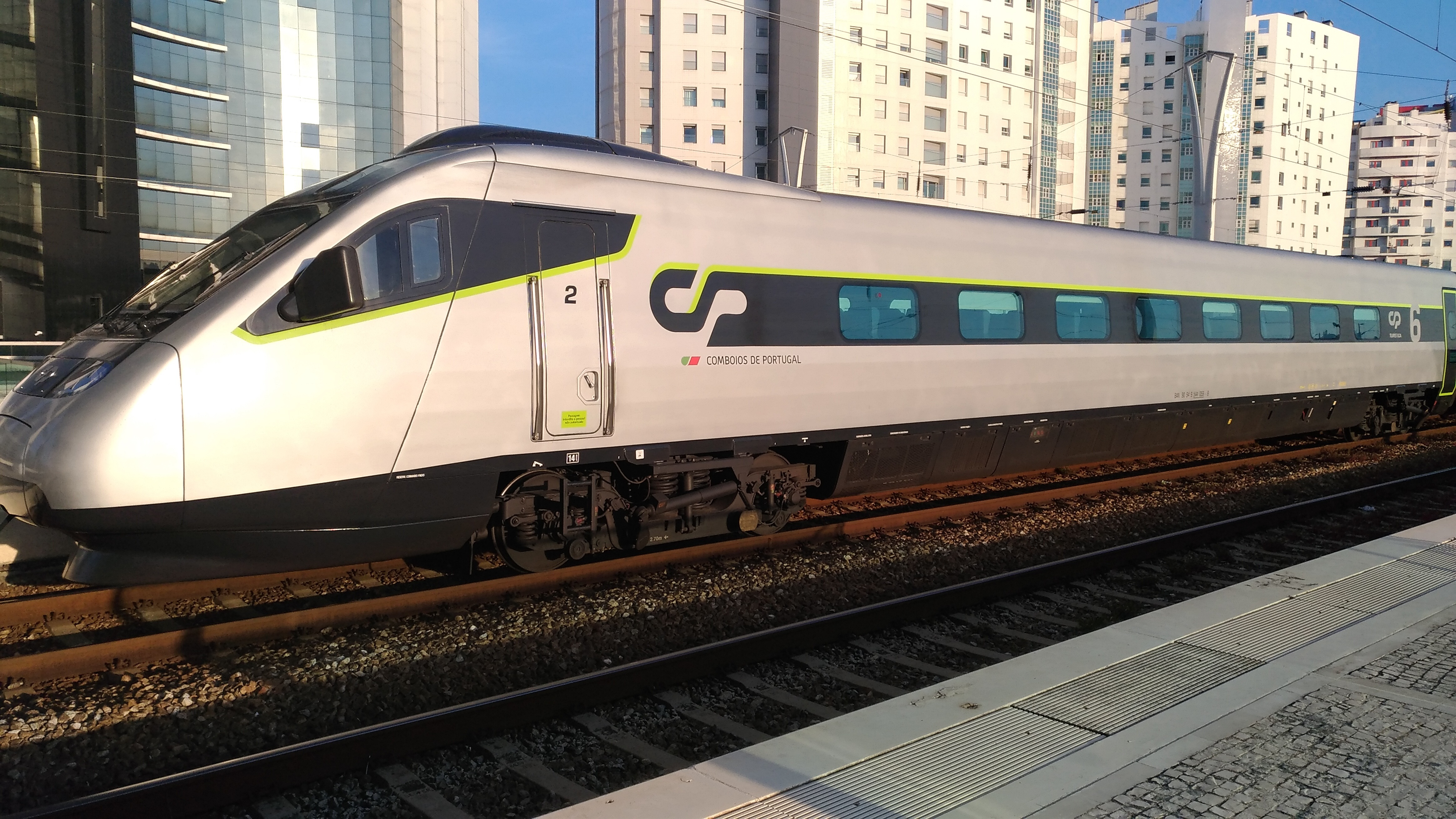
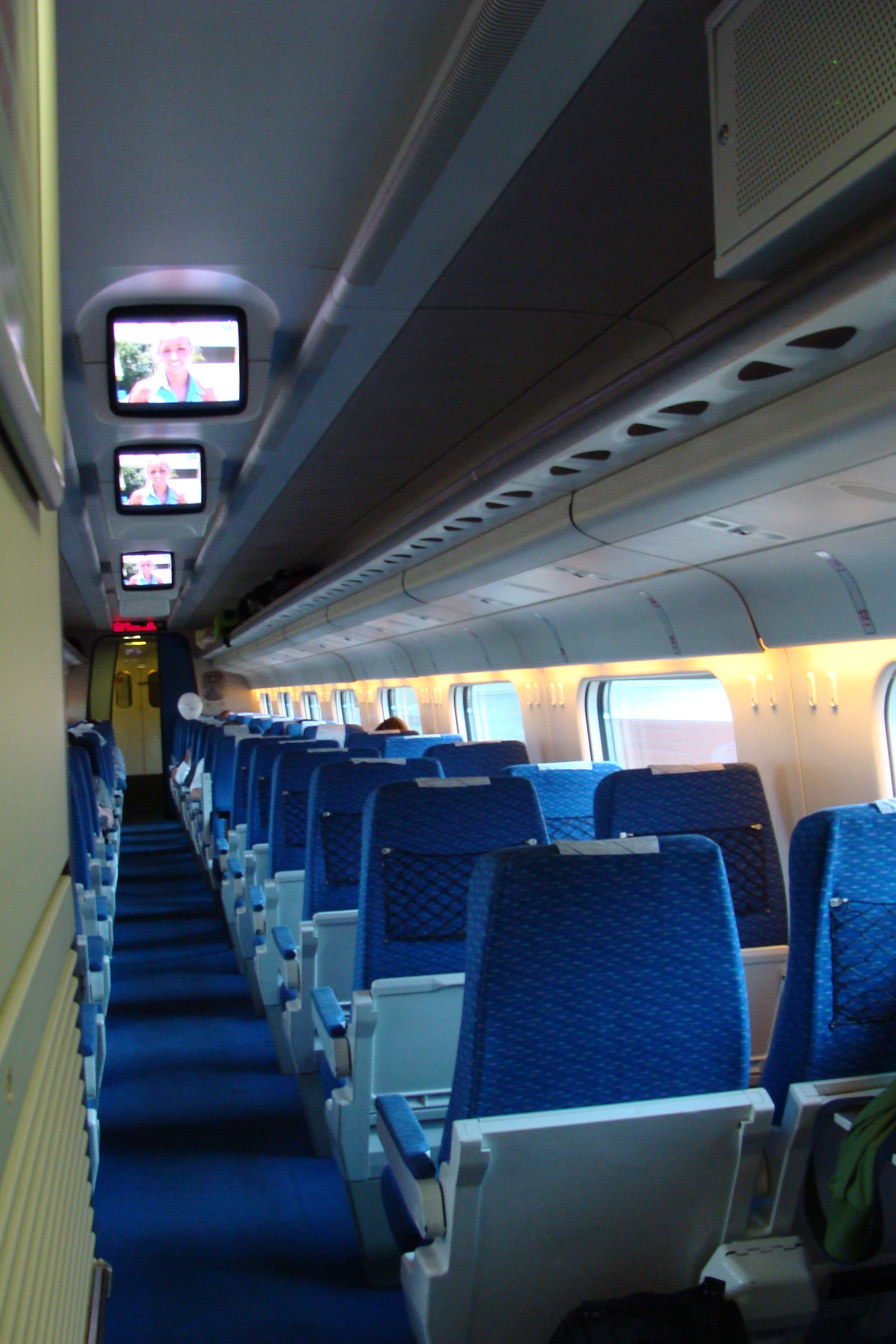
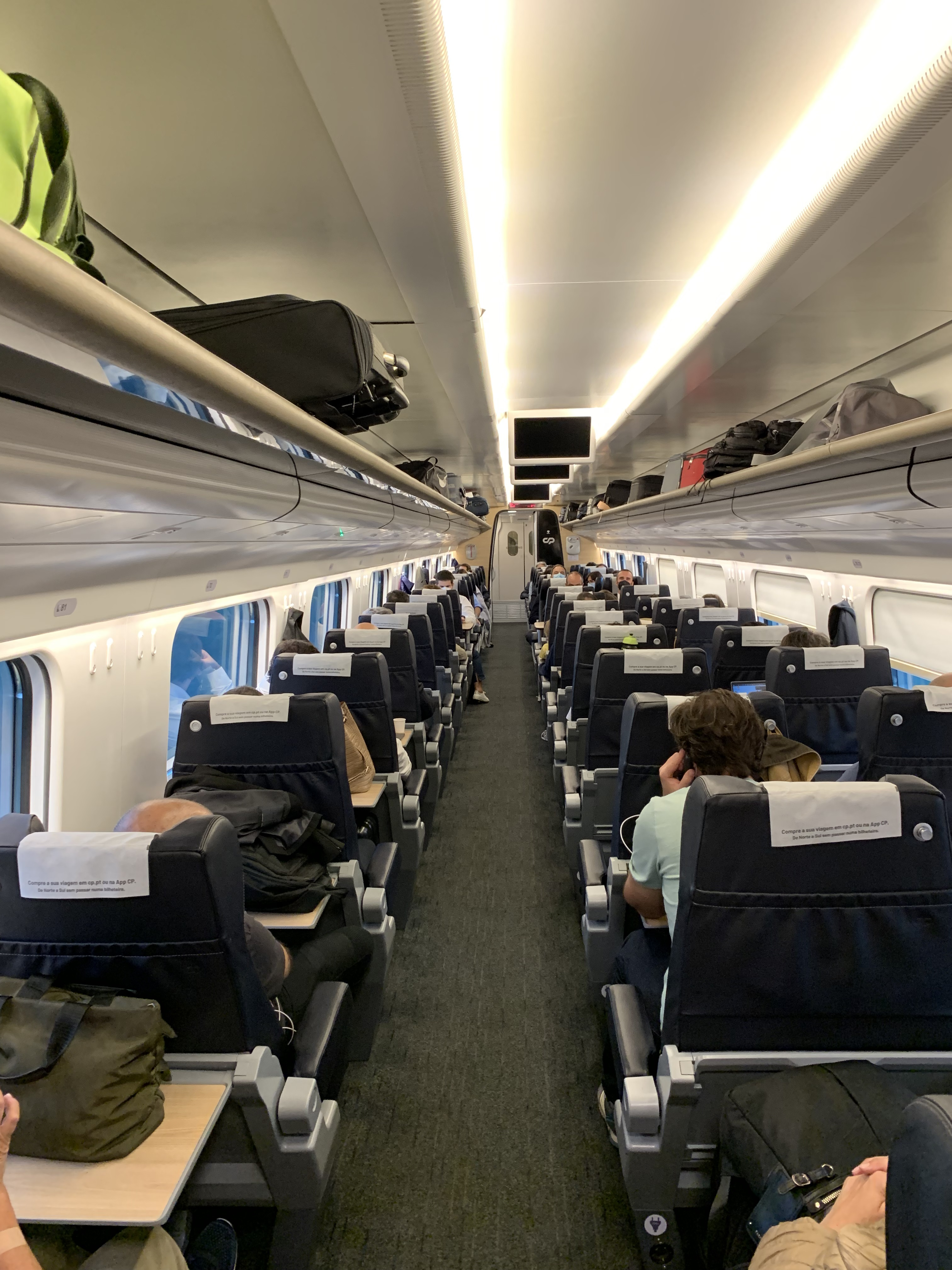
Alfa Pendular Alfa Pendular train, 2017 generation Carriage interior First class
- Manufacturer: FIAT Ferroviaria, ADtranz, Siemens
- Built at: Sorefame, Amadora
- Family name: Pendolino
- Entered service: 1999
- Refurbished: 2017
- Number built: 10 six-carriage units
- Number in service: 9
- Number scrapped: 1
- Fleet numbers: Série 4000 (numbers 4001–4010 and 4051–4060)
- Capacity: 301 seats
- Operators: CP
- Lines served: Braga-Porto-Lisbon-Faro

Specifications
- Train length: 158.9 m (521 ft 4 in)
- Width: 2.92 m (9 ft 7 in)
- Height: 4.39 m (14 ft 5 in)
- Maximum speed: 220 km/h (135 mph)
- Weight: 298.3 t (293.6 long tons; 328.8 short tons)
- Axle load: 14.3 t (14.1 long tons; 15.8 short tons)
- Traction system: 8 asynchronous three-phase Siemens 1TB2223-OGA03 motors
- Power output: 4,000 kW (5,400 hp)
- UIC classification: (1A)(A1) – (1A)(A1) – 2′2′ + 2′2′ – (1A)(A1) – (1A)(A1)
- Track gauge: 1,668 mm (5 ft 5 21/32 in) Iberian gauge

Alfa Pendular is the name of the flagship Pendolino high-speed tilting train of Portuguese state railway company Comboios de Portugal.

Since the 1990's it connects the near-coastal and coastal cities of Braga, Porto, Aveiro, Coimbra, Santarém, Lisbon, Albufeira, and Faro, spanning from North to South, at speeds of up to 220 km/h (135 mph).

The trains were assembled in Portugal by ADtranz at the former Sorefame works at Amadora, based on contracting partnership between Fiat-Ferroviaria as the main contractor and ADtranz and Siemens as the main subcontractors.

In 2017, the Alfa train fleet was upgraded with new interiors, livery, seating, and features such as Wi-Fi, plugs and chargers for electronic devices.

== Description ==
The Alfa Pendular high speed train is a six car electric multiple unit (EMU), which is derived from, and closely resembles the Giugiaro designed Italian Fiat-Ferroviaria ETR 480 Pendolino train. The bogies were redesigned to operate on Portugal's 1,668 mm (5 ft 5 21/32 in) Iberian gauge specific rails.

There are 8 traction motors, installed on all but the two middle vehicles of the train, developing 4.0 megawatts (5,400 hp). This M-M-T-T-M-M arrangement spreads the weight of the train, giving it a weight of only 13.5 tonnes (13.3 long tons; 14.9 short tons) per axle, which helps its cornering ability at high speed.

During testing, a top speed of 245.6 km/h (152.6 mph) was reached close to Espinho in 1998.

=== Tilting technology ===
Its tilting train technology, with a maximum tilt angle of 8°, allows the train to navigate curves at higher speeds than conventional trains. The combination of the resulting high cornering velocity and the tilting movement of the carriages helps ensure a comfortable ride for the passengers, although the jostle and sway compensating for track irregularities may cause "motion sickness" in those susceptible. The hydraulic tilting system is governed by two gyroscopes in the head cars. The curve is found on the base of the elevation of the external track.

The use of this train did not require particular modifications to the existing rail network, but it is expensive in terms of maintenance of the rolling stock because of the complexity of the tilting system.

== History ==
The Alfa Pendular service was officially launched in 1999, connecting Lisbon to Porto, replacing the previous Alfa service (provided by locomotive + carriages type trains), on the same route since the 1980's. The introduction of the Alfa Pendular was considered one of the most important milestones in the development of rail transport in Portugal.

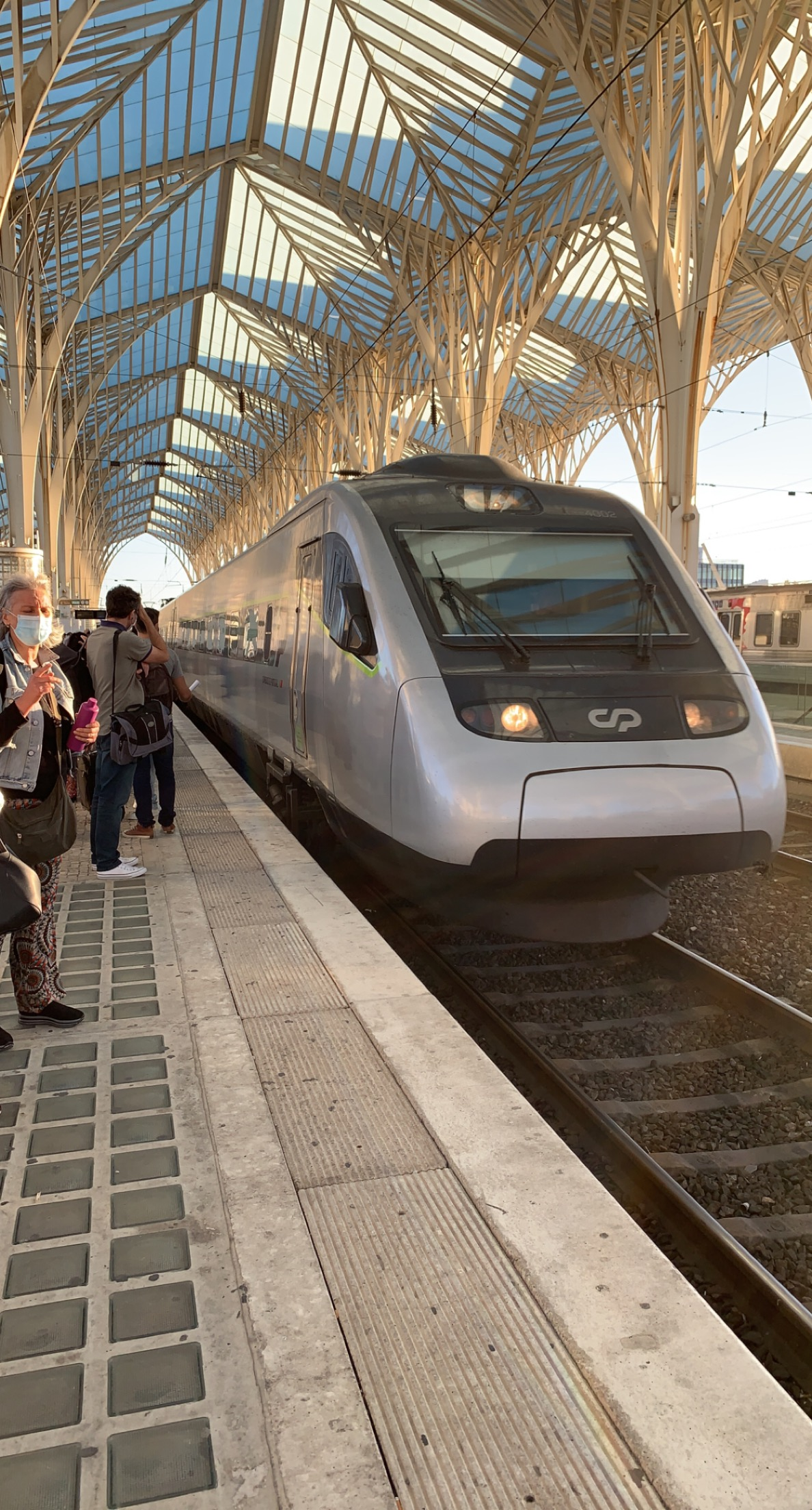
Alfa Pendular at Gare do Oriente.

Initially planned to link the country's two main cities, Lisbon and Porto, the pendulum train routes were expanded, and by 1996 they included the entire base network of the Portuguese railway system serving Intercidades (Intercity). An extensive axis linking the country from North to South was created between Braga, Porto, Lisbon, Setúbal, with connections to Alto-Minho, Douro-Litoral, Beiras, Alentejo-Litoral and the Algarve.

By 2004, the company Rede Ferroviária Nacional concluded its modernization projects for the Minho and Sul lines and the Braga Branch, with the extension of Alfa Pendular services to Braga and Faro, as part of the Eixo Atlântico program.

On 20 May 2016, the Alfa Pendular service broke a new daily record, having transported 8,080 passengers in the 24 trains it operated that day — the second highest number of people transported in a day in 2016, having reached 7,557 passengers on 6 May.

In 2017, the Alfa Pendular trains had transported over 26 million customers, and travelled a distance of more than 45 million kilometers.

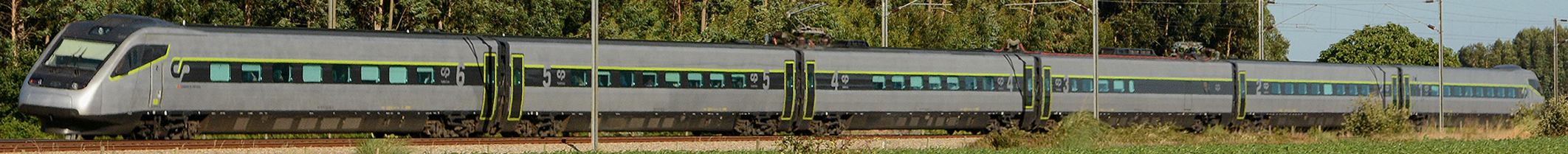
Side view, showing the carriages.

== Stations ==
The stations served by the Alfa Pendular are, from north to south:

- Braga
- Famalicão
- Trofa
- Porto-Campanhã
- Vila Nova de Gaia
- Espinho
- Aveiro
- Coimbra-B
- Pombal
- Entroncamento
- Santarém
- Lisboa–Oriente
- Lisboa–Santa Apolónia (off the lines from/to Faro)
- Lisboa-Entrecampos
- Pinhal Novo
- Tunes
- Albufeira-Ferreiras
- Loulé
- Faro

== See also ==
- List of high speed trains
