= Campanhã railway station =

Railway station in Porto, Portugal

Campanhã
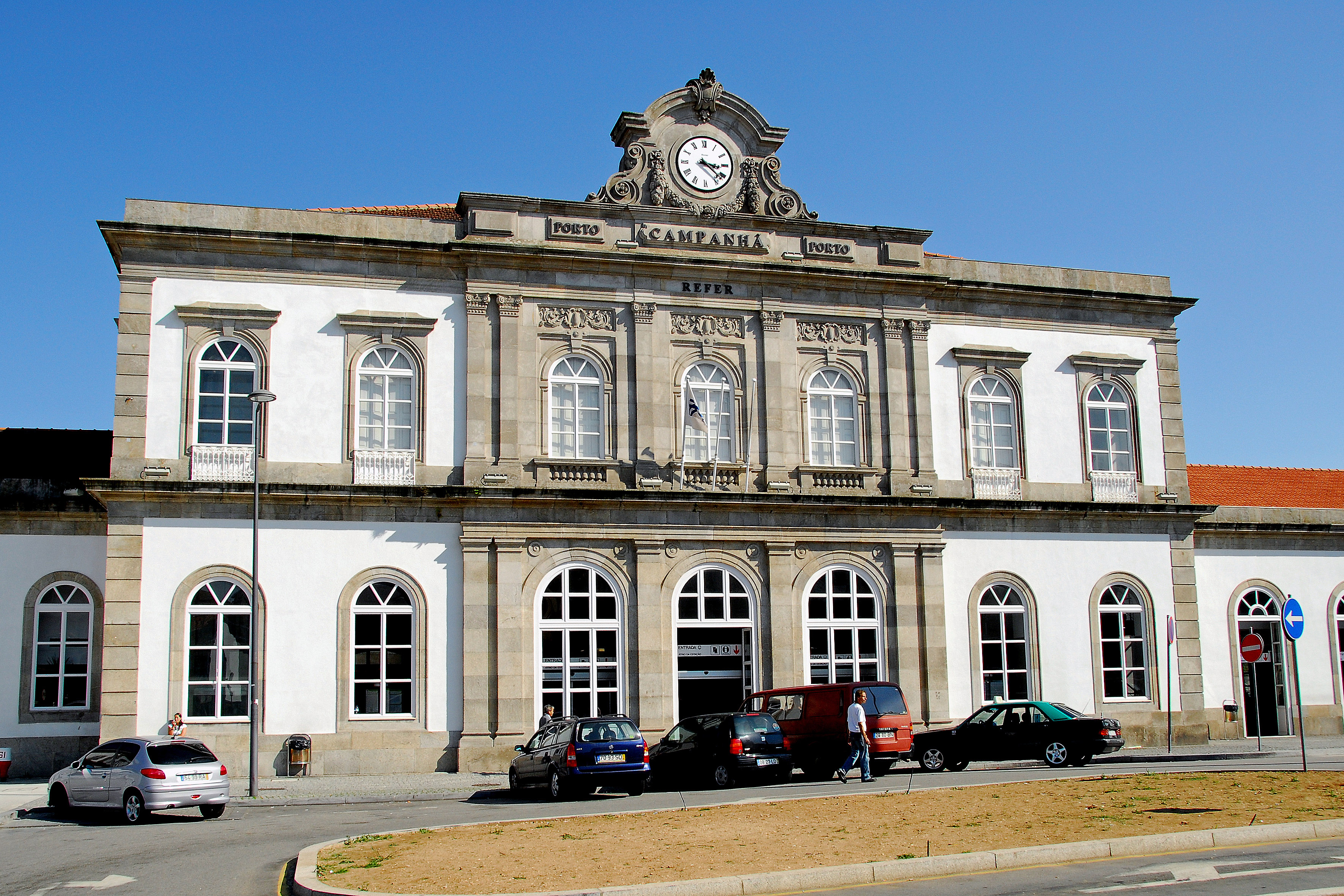
- The 19th century facade of the railway station in Campanhã

General information
- Location: Campanhã, Porto, Portugal
- Coordinates: 41°08′56″N 8°35′07″W
- Connections: Campanhã

History
- Opened: 21 May 1875

Services
Preceding station	Comboios de Portugal	Following station
Vila Nova de Gaia towards Lisbon-Santa Apolónia	Alfa Pendular	Famalicão towards Braga
Vila Nova de Gaia towards Faro	Alfa Pendular	Terminus
Vila Nova de Gaia towards Lisbon-Santa Apolónia	Intercidades	Famalicão towards Braga
Vila Nova de Gaia towards Lisbon-Santa Apolónia	Intercidades	Trofa towards Guimarães
Vila Nova de Gaia towards Lisbon-Santa Apolónia	Intercidades	Trofa towards Valença
Vila Nova de Gaia towards Lisbon-Santa Apolónia	Intercidades	Terminus
Other services
Preceding station	Comboios de Portugal	Following station
Terminus	Celta International Service	Nine towards Vigo-Guixar
Porto-São Bento Terminus	InterRegional	Ermesinde towards Valença
Vila Nova de Gaia towards Figueira da Foz	InterRegional	Ermesinde towards Valença
Terminus	InterRegional	Ermesinde towards Valença
Porto-São Bento Terminus	InterRegional	Ermesinde towards Pocinho
Terminus	InterRegional	Contumil towards Pocinho
Terminus	InterRegional	Ermesinde towards Régua
Porto-São Bento Terminus	InterRegional	Ermesinde towards Régua
Vila Nova de Gaia towards Coimbra-B	InterRegional	Terminus
Vila Nova de Gaia towards Entroncamento	InterRegional	Terminus
Vila Nova de Gaia towards Lisbon-Santa Apolónia	InterRegional	Terminus
Porto-São Bento Terminus	Regional	Contumil towards Viana do Castelo
General Torres towards Coimbra-B	Regional	Terminus
Vila Nova de Gaia towards Entroncamento	Regional	Terminus
General Torres towards Lisbon-Santa Apolónia	Regional	Terminus
Preceding station	CP Porto	Following station
Porto-São Bento; Terminus	Linha do Marco	Contumil toward Marco de Canaveses
Porto-São Bento; Terminus	Linha de Guimarães	Contumil toward Guimarães
Porto-São Bento; Terminus	Linha de Braga	Contumil toward Braga
Porto-São Bento; Terminus	Linha de Aveiro	General Torres toward Aveiro
Location

The Campanhã Railway Station (Portuguese: Estação Ferroviária de Campanhã) is a 19th-century railway station in the civil parish of Campanhã, in the municipality of Porto, district of Porto. Opened in 1877, it is connected to the Metro do Porto by the adjacent Campanhã metro station, and provides access to local commuter trains to Aveiro, Braga, Guimarães and Marco de Canaveses, Intercity and Alfa Pendular trains to Lisbon, inter-regional trains to Valença (which then provide access to Vigo), and the historical train to Pocinho.

== History ==
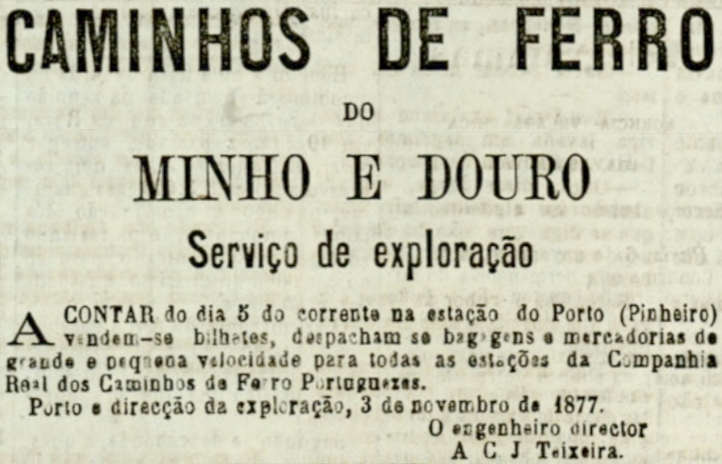
The tender notice issued in 1877 for the exploration of the rail service concession at the Railway Station of Pinehro

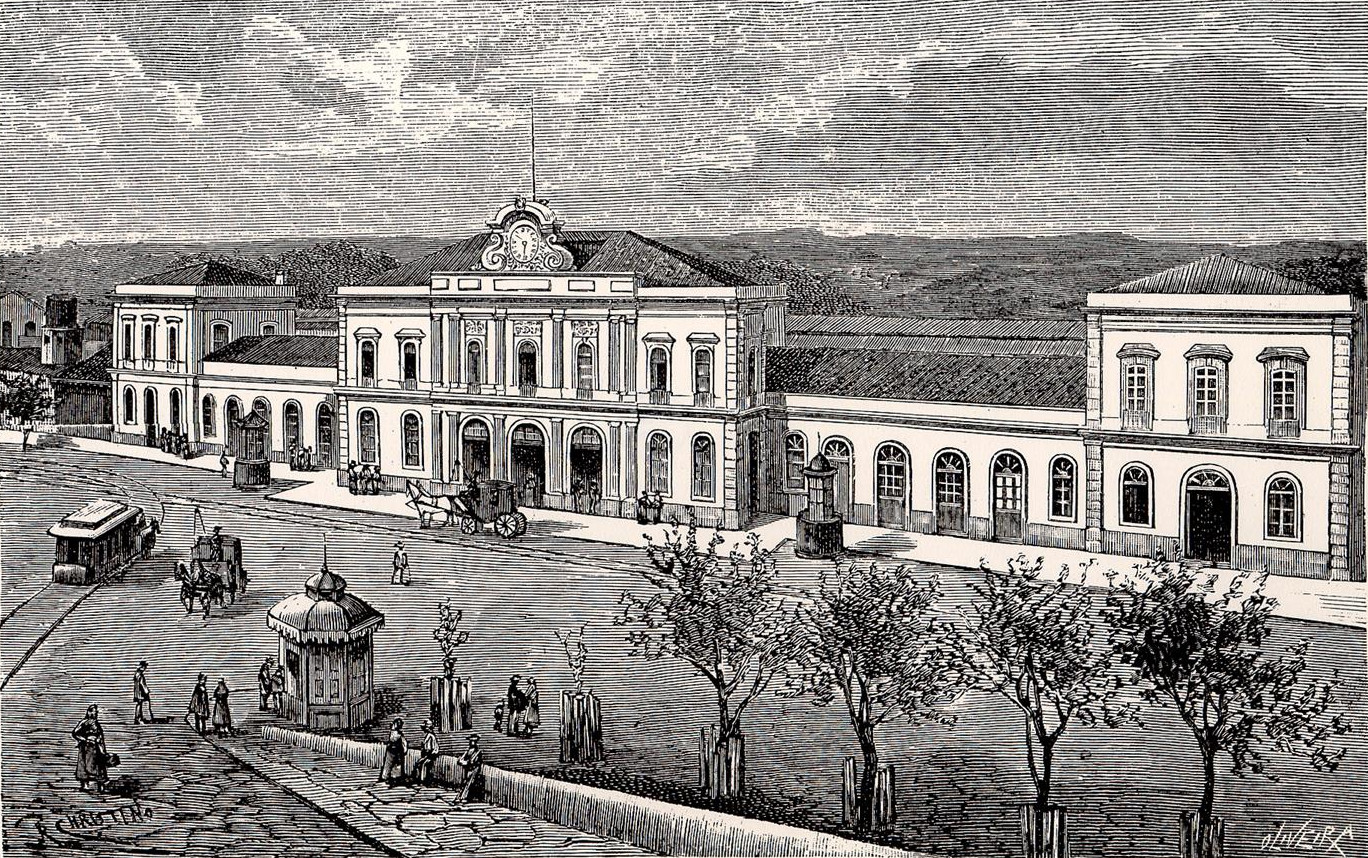
A zincography design of the Campanhã station in 1835

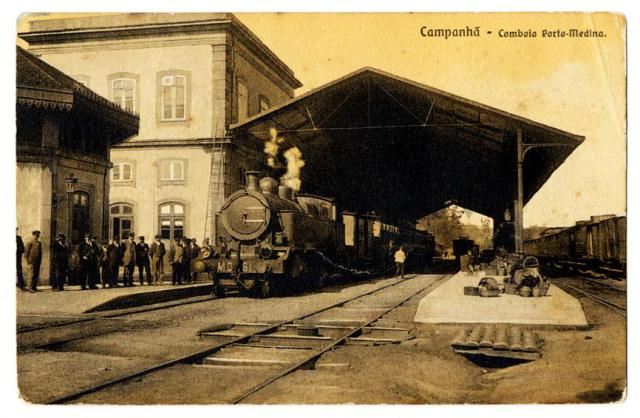
A view of the platform and passengers waiting at the updated Campanhã station (1899)

The first plan for a station was presented in 1860, to be built in Esteiro de Campanhã and that connected the Douro line to Minho, through an extension that follows the Campanhã valley to the branches along the Rio Tinto. Initially designated, the Estação de caminho de ferro do Pinheiro (Pinheiro Railway Station), the station at Campanhã was designated for lands occupied by the estates of Quinta do Pinheiro and Quintas do Valado.

In 1872, the current layout was definitively set by Manuel Afonso Espregueira, Pedro Inácio Lopes and Alexandre Eiffel. Manuel Afonso de Espregueira, from Viana do Castelo, had a licentiate degree in mathematics from the University of Coimbra, and completed courses in infantry and general staff at the Escola do Exército (Military School). Later he attended the École Imperiale des Ponts et Chaussées, in Paris, where he was one of the better students and colleague of other important people, such as Sadi Carnot (later President of the French Republic. In 1880, he abandoned the army and entered the public service (specifically the Ministry of Public Works) where he held various positions and was part of several projects (such as artificial port of Leixões, improvements to the Barra do Porto and Figueira da Foz, among others). He was a director of the first Divisão Hidráulica do Reino (Hydraulic Division of the Kingdom) that was responsible for ports and inlets along the area north of the Mondego, except Aveiro.

Between 1872 and 1885, Manuel Afonso de Espregueira, was director general for the Companhia Real dos Caminhos-de-ferro (Royal Railway Company), but in 1874, he was responsible for the elaboration of the general plan, that included all the lines that crossed the Douro and Norte region.

By 1875, the first trains began to run along the northern Douro, between Pinheiro-Campanhã and Braga. On 28 April, they began work on the "Eiffel Bridge", projected by Seyrig from the Eiffel School of Paris.

An accord was established between the government and the Royal on 15 September 1875, to begin the construction of the railway station. On 4 November 1877, following diverse vicissitudes during the construction, the inauguration, along with that of the Bridge D. Maria Pia was celebrated, with the presence of King D. Luís and Queen D. Maria Pia. The first train arrived the railway station from São Bento in 1896.

In 1923, Cottinelli Telmo in partnership with Luís da Cunha, authored the first project plan to construct a dormitory for railway personnel, but was never executed. A second version, which was submitted in 1925, was approved. Between 1943 and 1945, Cottinelli Telmo expanded the construction by building a warehouse for foodstuffs.

By decree 104/97, the management of the railways was entrusted to a new company, the Rede Ferroviária Nacional (National Railway) in 1997.

Commemorations celebrating the Portuguese railway system's 150 years were celebrated at Campanhã in 2006.

== Architecture ==
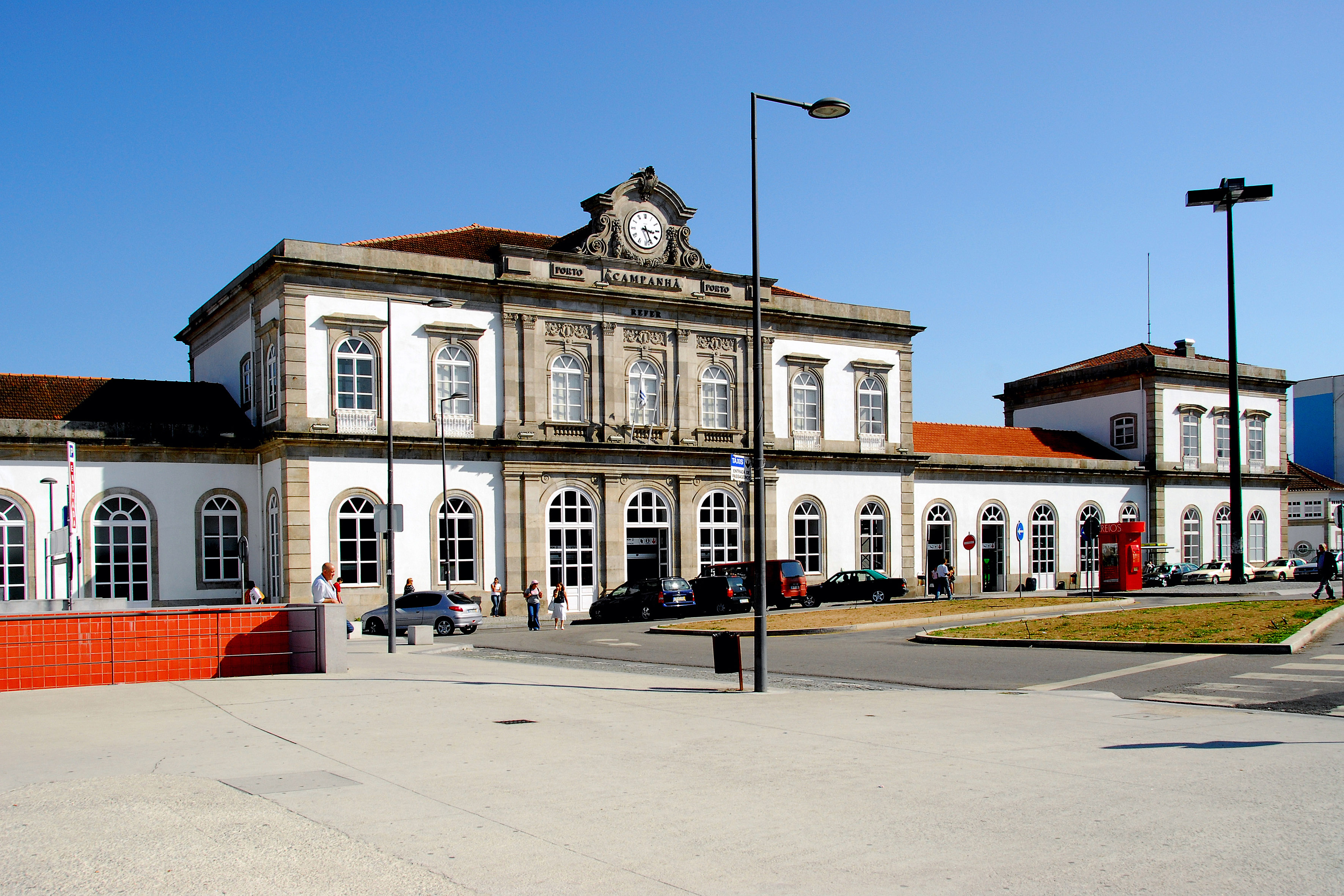
A view of the Largo da Estação and Campanhã station

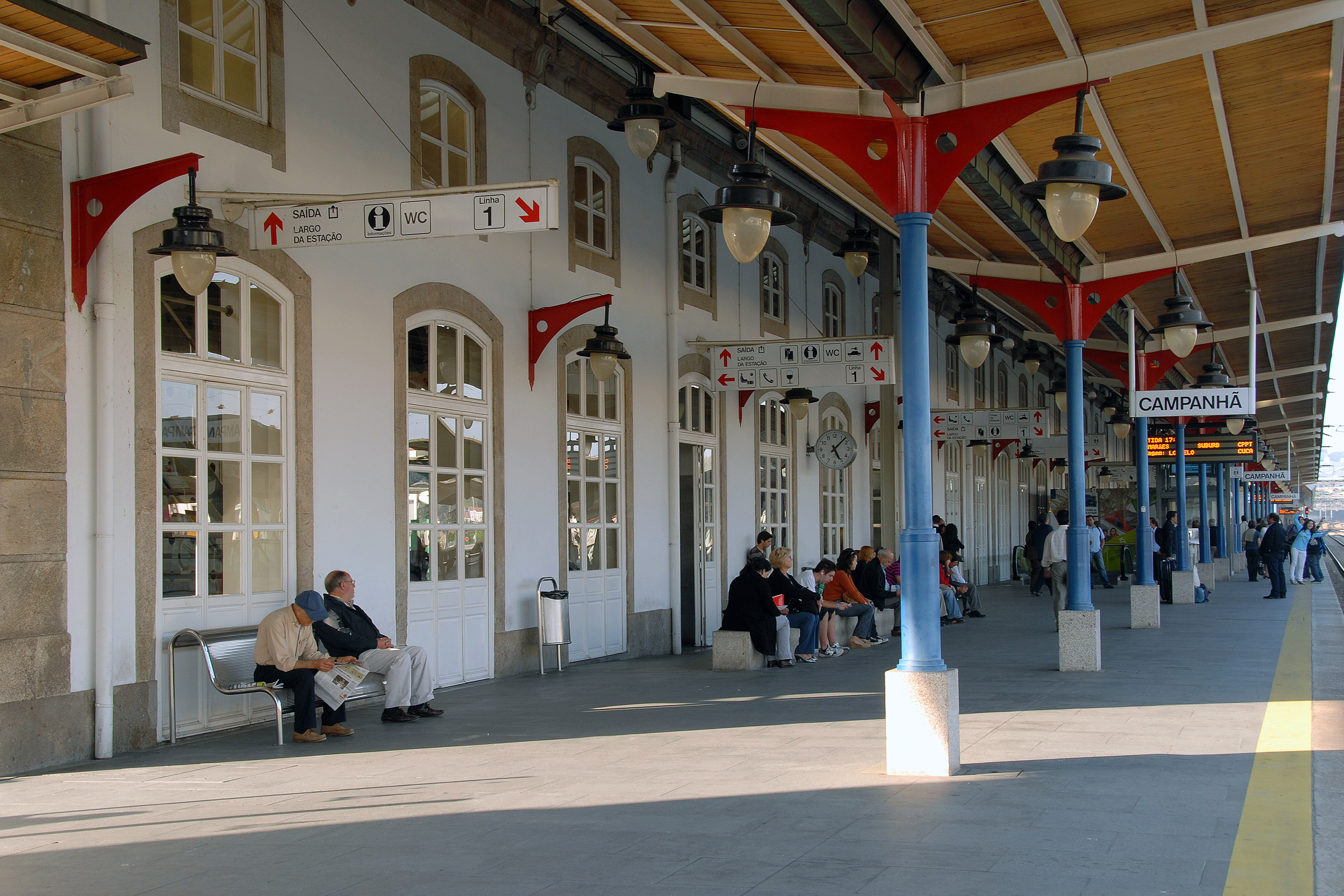
A view of the rail platform and rear facade

The station is situated in an isolated space, implanted on level terrain, on the eastern end of the city of Porto, along the right margin of the Douro River. The principal facade is exposed to the Largo da Estação towards the urban centre of Campanhã, and its rear towards the railway lines and departure platforms. In actuality it is a central station to the city.

The station includes, not only the passenger terminal, but also some support buildings, with sanitary installations, covered wharfs and carriage house. The main building has a rectangular plan, that comprises five bodies, that occupy a linear tract. The rectangular, two-story, central corp is slightly extended from the main body, and flanked by the lateral, single-story wings, that extend to another two lateral sections. The facades are plastered and painted in white, along with the frames and bunting, while the pilasters, decorative friezes and cornices are in granite.

All first-story facades are broken by rounded windows or doorways, interspersed by pilasters and ionic capitals, while similar motifs are included in the upper floor of the central block. This facade (oriented to the west) is divided into five sections, with the central partially section decorated in granite, with split silhouettes, while the floors are separated by friezes and cornices, this topped by elaborate friezes along the second floor, punctuated by three central inscriptions PORTO - CAMPANHÃ - PORTO and a minor inscription under the cornice: REFER. The frontispiece integrates a circular clock, flanked by fins, and finished in semicircular pediment with wide phytomorphic key. On the ground floor there are three perfect, molded back porticos, with flagstone integrated with two windows on each side. On the upper floors there are six balcony windows, surrounded by rectangular frame and topped by cornice, protected by stone balusters (on the central section) and iron railings on the sides. The intermediate sections are torn by six spans identical to those on the ground floor of the central facade.

The facades of the lateral bodies, are broken by two windows and central door (at ground floor) and three balcony windows (on the upper floor). The lateral facades with identical layout, has a visible mezzanine between the two floors, while underneath the frieze is a blue-and-white azulejo panel, with the inscription PORTO CAMPANHÃ.

The rear facade is symmetrically-broken by numerous spans of identical composition, with a full-length porch, resting on the cornice and iron pillars resting on granite plinths, supported by the boarding platform.

== Service ==
Campanhã station is one of two railway stations in Porto, with the other being the São Bento (the city centre terminus station for local trains and passenger service to the north, including the Douro line). All Comboios de Portugal (CP) services operate through Campanhã, including other services such as the Alfa Pendular high speed trains and Inter Cidades (inter-city) suburban trains, which continue on to São Bento. Suburban trains coming from General Torres reverse here and continue to São Bento.

== Porto Metro station ==
Campanhã is an integral line within the Metro do Porto, except Line D; all these services route through the station. Campanhã is also the terminal hub of Line C, which connects the station to ISMAI (Instituto Universitário da Maia). Passenger trams stopping at Campanhã allow offload to other routes, but farther beyond the terminal station for visitors to the Estádio do Dragão and railyard.
