= Linha do Norte =

Railway line in Portugal

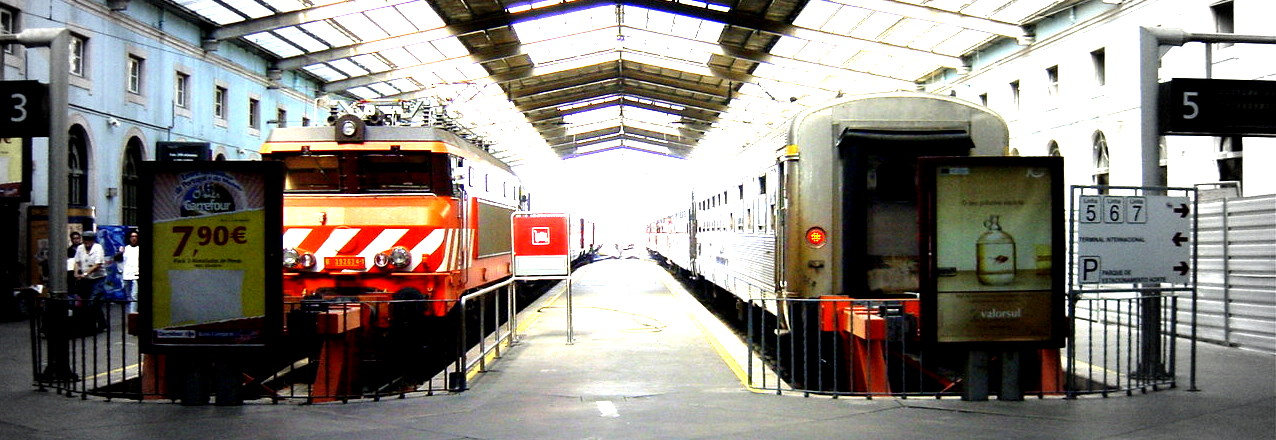
- Santa Apolónia railway station in Lisbon.

Overview
- Status: Operational
- Owner: Infraestruturas de Portugal
- Termini: Lisboa-Santa Apolónia; Porto-Campanhã

Service
- Type: High-speed rail; Heavy rail; Regional rail
- Operator(s): CP - Comboios de Portugal

History
- Opened: 4 November 1877

Technical
- Line length: 336 km (209 mi)
- Number of tracks: Double track, except Braço de Prata–Alverca (quad) and Castanheira do Ribatejo–Azambuja (triple)
- Track gauge: Iberian
- Electrification: Fully Electrified at 25 kV / 50 kHz Overhead line
- Operating speed: Maximum speed Tilting Trains: 220km/h (140mph); Conventional Trains: 200km/h (125mph)
Route map
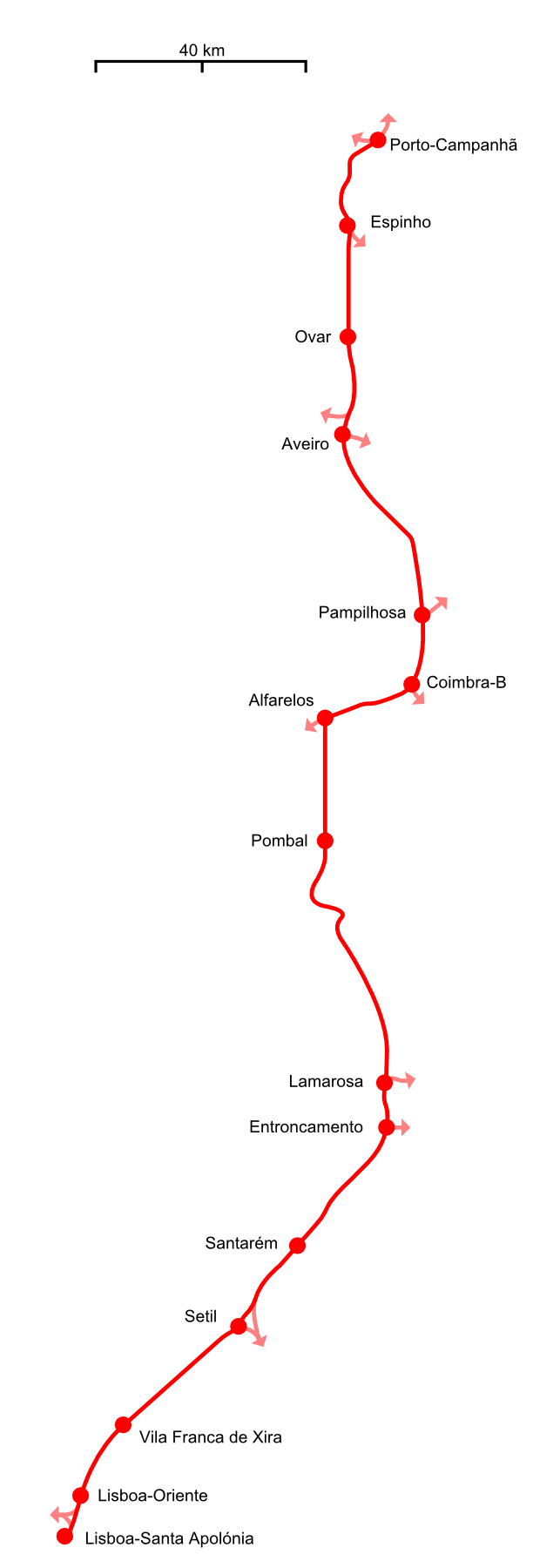

Location on the network
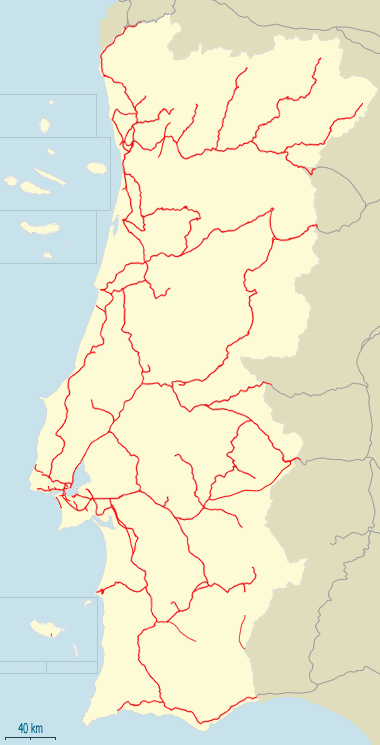

+ Lisboa-SA × Porto-Camp. (🔎)

Linha do Norte is the Portuguese main railway line that connects the two main Portuguese cities, Lisbon and Porto. Its length is 336.079 kilometres (208.830 mi). It goes through some other important cities such as Vila Franca de Xira, Santarém, Entroncamento, Pombal, Coimbra, Aveiro, Espinho and Vila Nova de Gaia. It constitutes the backbone of the Portuguese railway system of freight and passenger services, running approximately 720 trains (both freight and passenger) daily.

As part of the plans for a high-speed rail network, there will be a parallel high-speed line (up to 300 km/h (190 mph)) to relieve this main line, since it has reached a saturation threshold where it's impossible to add additional freight trains without jamming the fast passenger services (InterCidades and Alfa Pendular).

== History ==
=== Planning and construction ===
The line was first conceived as part of a broader plan to create a Portuguese railway network. On 30 August 1852, the government issued a decree outlining the initial route for what was then referred to as the "Caminho de Ferro do Norte" (Northern Railway). This line was envisioned as a branch of the Linha do Leste, a line designed to connect Lisbon with the Spanish border. The planned alignment for the Linha do Norte began near the confluence of the Tagus and Zêzere Rivers (modern day Entroncamento), with proposals for two possible routes: one through the valleys of the Soure and Mondego Rivers and another passing through the city of Tomar. Proposals for the segment near Aveiro also included variants that either bypassed or closely approached the urban area. Crucially, the line was designed to cross the Douro River, ensuring its terminus in Porto. The route planning north of Entroncamento began in 1856, with the section until Coimbra assigned to B. Wattier and the remaining to Francisco Sousa Brandão and John Rennie.

The first sections of Linha do Norte to be completed were those shared with Linha do Leste. On 28 October 1856, the section between Lisbon and Carregado was complete, marking the opening of the first railway in Portugal. Subsequent segments were completed over the next several years, gradually extending the line northward. By 1861, the railway had reached Santarém, and on 7 November 1862, the critical junction at Entroncamento was completed, where the Linha do Norte diverged from the Linha do Leste.

The construction of the northern extension to Porto proceeded in stages. A provisional connection between Vila Nova de Gaia and Estarreja was established in November 1862 and made permanent in June 1863. The remaining sections were completed incrementally, with significant milestones including the opening of the Taveiro-Estarreja segment in April 1864 and the Entroncamento-Soure section in May 1864. The final connection between Soure and Taveiro was completed in July 1864, enabling continuous rail travel between Lisbon and Vila Nova de Gaia. However, the line was only fully completed with the inauguration of the Maria Pia Bridge over the Douro River on 4 November 1877.

The construction of the Linha do Norte presented numerous engineering challenges. The Albergaria tunnel, near Albergaria dos Doze, required foreign expertise, including specialists from Ireland, England, and Italy, due to the unstable composition of the soil. In Coimbra, proximity to the Mondego River posed a flood risk, leading to careful placement of the railway in more stable areas, cutting through the village of Pereira, dividing it in two and placing Coimbra's station north of the city center. In Aveiro, the alignment was adjusted to bring the line closer to the city, while the final approach to Porto involved significant challenges, particularly the crossing of the Douro River and navigating the rugged terrain near Vila Nova de Gaia.

The planning and construction of the line were also marked by controversies and compromises. The decision to bypass Tomar, motivated by the technical difficulties and higher costs of the proposed route through the city, caused considerable local discontent. To address this, the railway company committed to building a road connecting Chão de Maçãs to Tomar. A railway branch to the city, the Ramal de Tomar, would later on be built in 1928. Similarly, the placement of Coimbra's station north of the city center, provoked debate over accessibility and urban planning. A more central station would be later be built in 1885, which would become the start of Ramal da Lousã.

=== Improvements during the 1980s and 1990s ===
Between 1984 and 1991, the double-track Ponte de São João was constructed, leading to the retirement of Maria Pia Bridge. The project also involved extensive upgrades to nearby viaducts, tunnels, and support structures, alongside the modernization of tracks and technical equipment over a 3.8-kilometer stretch leading to Campanhã station.

In 1996, a broader renovation program began, spanning 328 kilometers from Lisbon-Braço de Prata to Vila Nova de Gaia. These works included upgrading railway performance through improvements to infrastructure and superstructures, such as track realignment, platform expansion, the installation of modern catenary systems and the expansion to four tracks between Braço de Prata and Alverca do Ribatejo. Safety enhancements included eliminating several level crossings, replacing them with viaducts, tunnels, and pedestrian overpasses. Urban sections of the line were fenced, and noise barriers were installed to reduce disturbances.

Renovation efforts extended to 40 stations and stops, each receiving tailored infrastructure improvements to meet local needs. Gare do Oriente in Lisbon, was designed as a multimodal transport hub for Expo 1998. In Espinho, an ambitious project reconfigured the rail line by constructing a 950-meter underground tunnel, relocating the station below ground and creating new urban connections.

== See also ==
- CP Urban Services
- List of railway lines in Portugal
- List of Portuguese locomotives and railcars
