= Guarda railway station =

Railway station in Guarda, Switzerland

Guarda
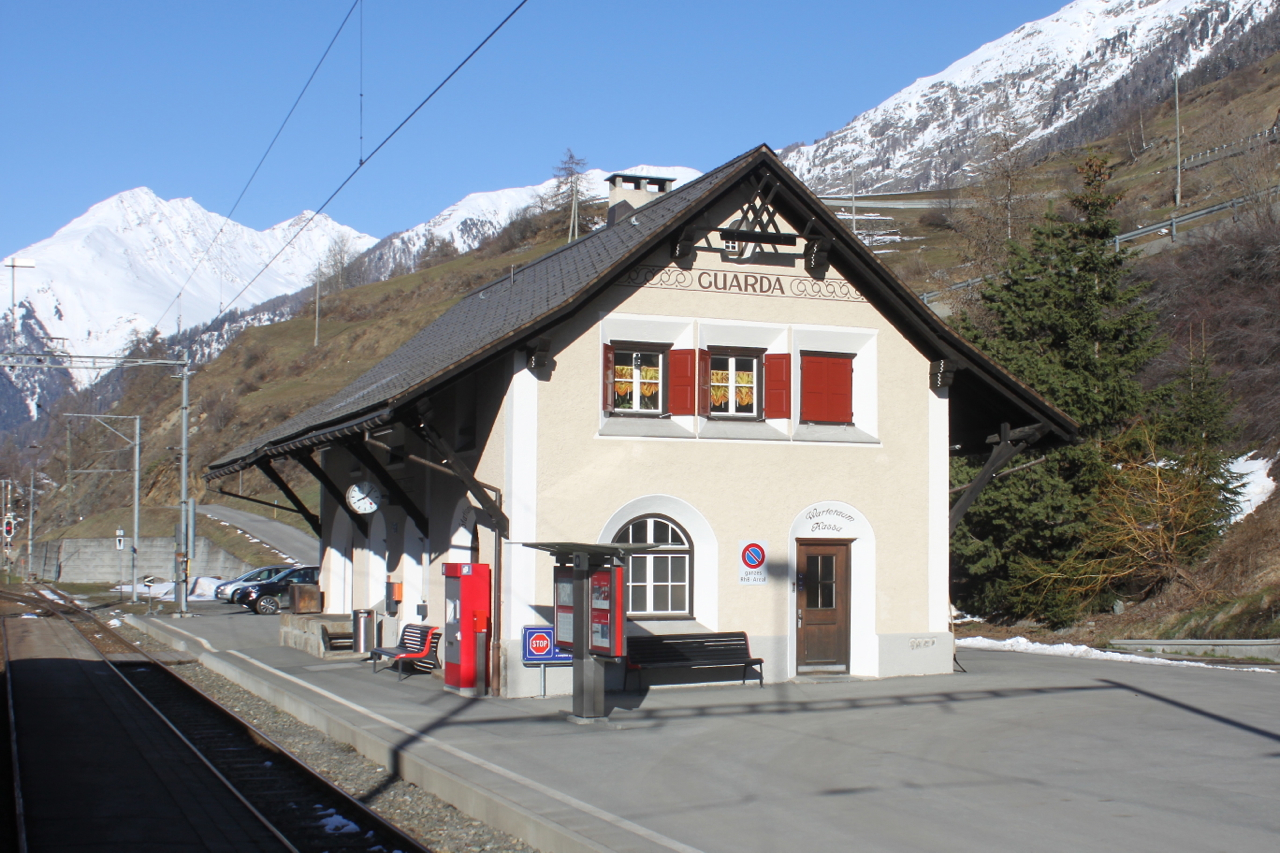
- The station building in 2014

General information
- Location: Scuol; Switzerland
- Coordinates: 46°46′17″N 10°09′02″E
- Elevation: 1,432 m (4,698 ft)
- Owner: Rhaetian Railway
- Line: Bever–Scuol-Tarasp line
- Distance: 133.3 km (82.8 mi) from Landquart
- Train operators: Rhaetian Railway
- Connections: PostAuto Schweiz buses

History
- Opened: 28 June 1913

Passengers
- 2018: 180 per weekday

Services
Preceding station	Rhaetian Railway	Following station
Lavin towards Landquart	RE 4	Ardez towards Scuol-Tarasp
Lavin towards Pontresina	R 15	Ardez towards Scuol-Tarasp
Location

Guarda railway station (German: Bahnhof Guarda) is a railway station in the village of Guarda, within the municipality of Scuol, in the Swiss canton of Grisons. It is an intermediate stop on the 1,000 mm (3 ft 3 3/8 in) gauge Bever–Scuol-Tarasp line of the Rhaetian Railway.

== Services ==
As of the December 2023 timetable change, the following services stop at Guarda:

- RegioExpress: hourly service between Landquart and Scuol-Tarasp.
- Regio: hourly service between Pontresina and Scuol-Tarasp.
