= CP Urban Services =

Commuter train network in Portugal

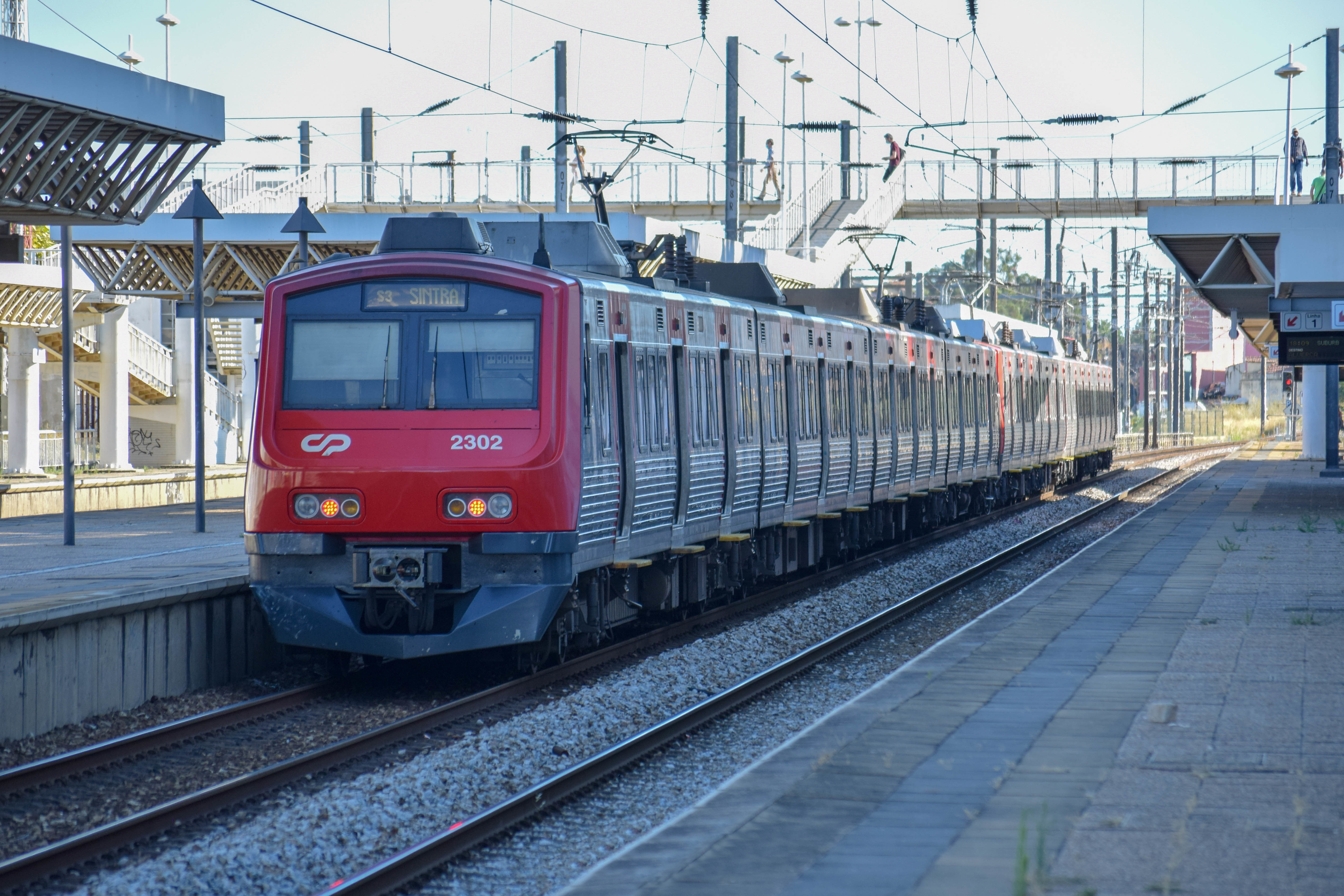

Overview
- Locale: Metropolitan Lisbon and Metropolitan Porto
- Transit type: Commuter rail
- Number of lines: 4 with 7 services (Lisbon) and 5 (Porto)
- Annual ridership: 103 million (Lisbon, 2019); 24 million (Porto, 2019)

Operation
- Operator: Comboios de Portugal

The CP Urban Services network is the commuter train network of Metropolitan Lisbon, Metropolitan Coimbra, and Metropolitan Porto, Portugal. It is a Comboios de Portugal subdivision, with the objective of connecting city centers with suburbs and nearby towns. Its divided in: CP Lisbon, CP Porto, and CP Coimbra.

== Metropolitan Lisbon network ==
Commuter rail lines in Lisbon

The system is complemented in Lisbon by the Lisbon Metro and an extensive bus network.

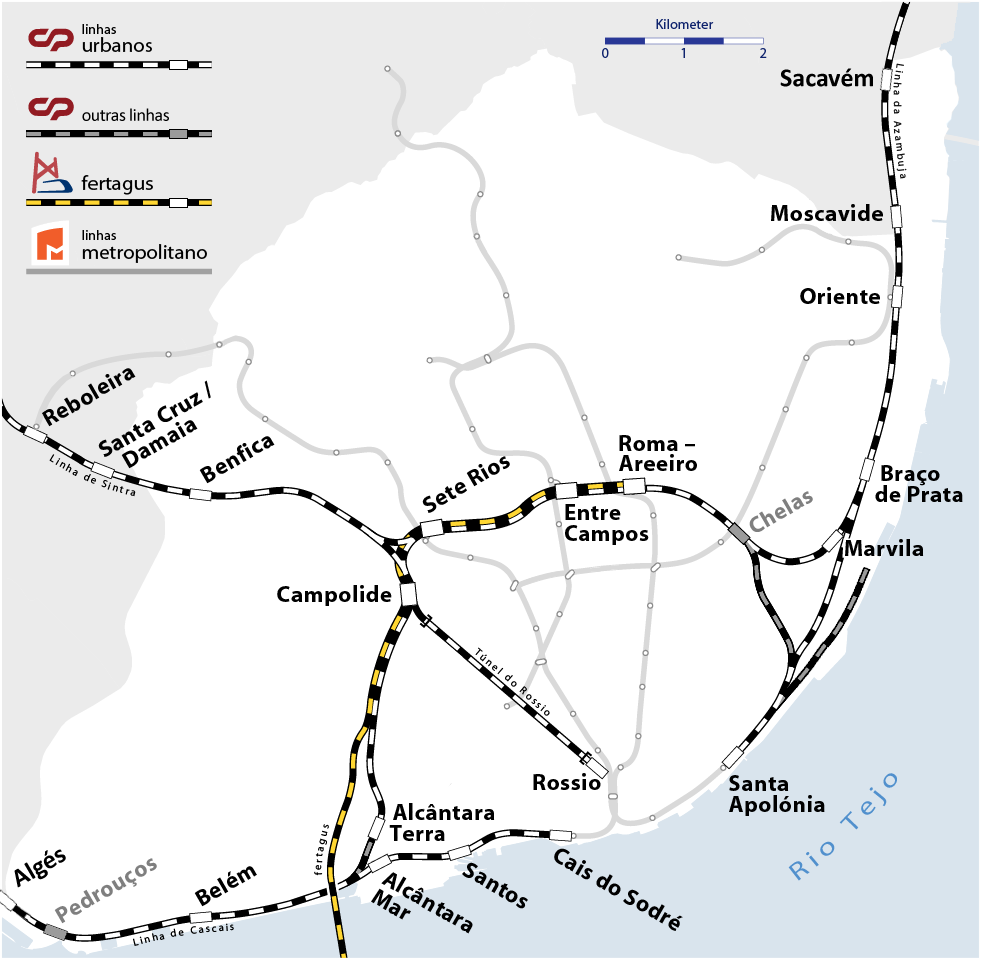
Lisbon rail lines overview, with CP, Fertagus and Lisbon Metro (filled light gray) lines

It comprises four lines which served 103 million passengers in 2019.

- Azambuja line: connects Azambuja and Castanheira do Ribatejo to Alcântara-Terra and Santa Apolónia
- Cascais line: connects Cascais to Cais do Sodré
- Sado line: connects Barreiro to Praias do Sado
- Sintra line: connects Sintra and Mira-Sintra-Meleças to Rossio, Alverca and Oriente

Although the Cintura line connects the Azambuja line (at Braço de Prata) to the Cascais line (at Alcântara-Mar), the stretch between Alcântara-Terra and Alcântara-Mar is only used for freight services, and passengers transferring between both stations have to do so on foot.

Nowadays, the services from the Azambuja and Sintra lines are joined in a single timetable, as "Azambuja/Lisboa/Sintra".

Since 2011, the Azambuja line has offered a direct connection between Azambuja and Alcântara-Terra, with an additional Castanheira–Santa Apolónia service during weekdays, a change that will be reversed with the Summer 2015 timetables, that reintroduce the older Azambuja–Santa Apolónia and Castanheira–Alcântara-Terra services.

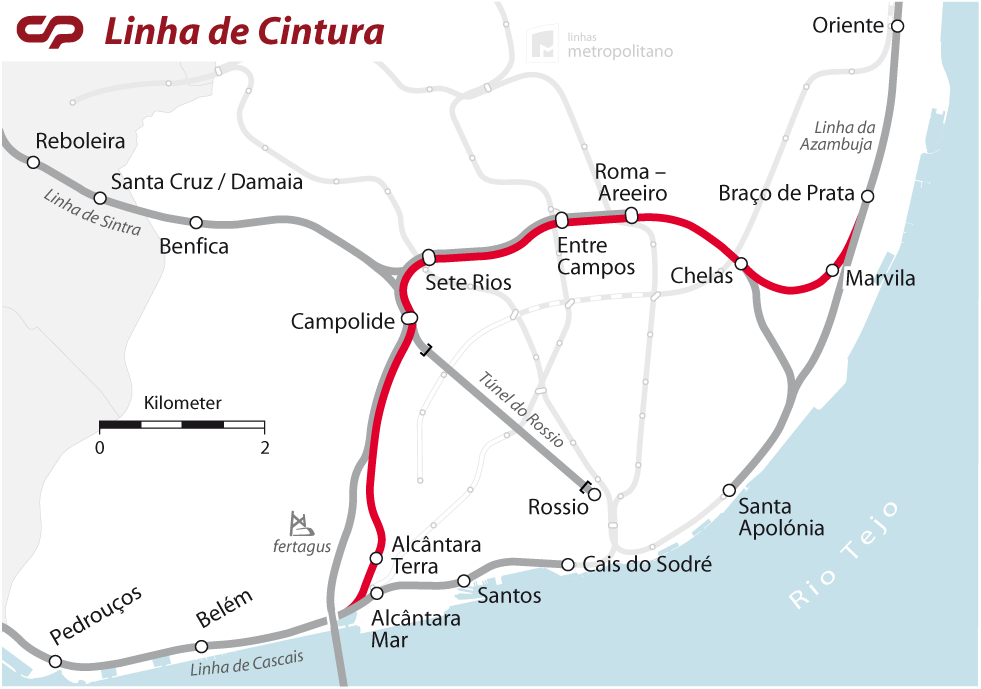
The Lisbon Cintura rail line, and its connections to the other North Lisbon urban lines

This network is also connected to Fertagus services, a private operated line that connects Setúbal to Roma-Areeiro station in Lisbon. All urban rail in the Lisbon metro area is integrated in the Navegante Card system of tickets.

== Metropolitan Porto network ==
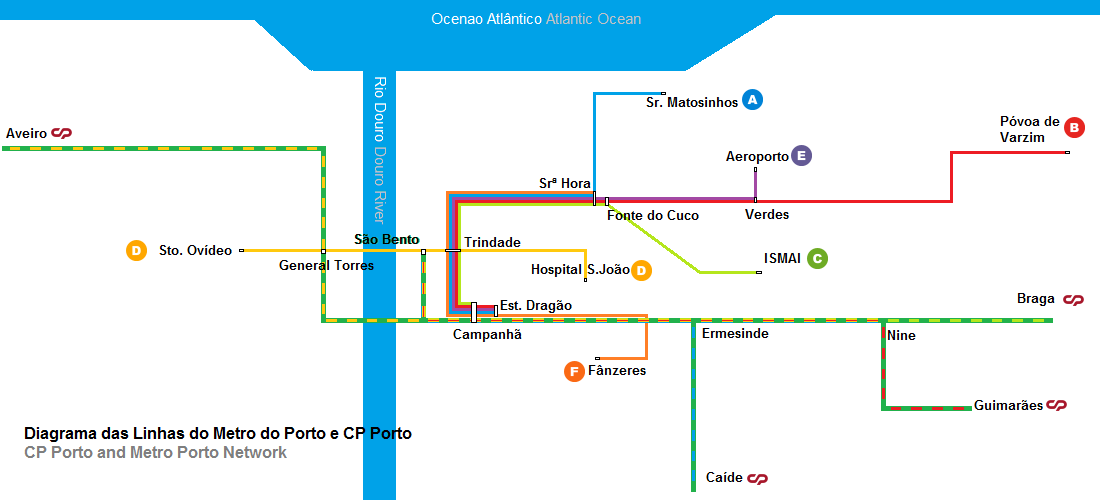
Map of the Porto network with the map of the Porto Metro

The CP Urban Services in the greater Porto area consists of 4 main lines, linking Porto Terminus São Bento Station (Estação de São Bento) in Porto Downtown with the cities of Braga, Guimarães, Aveiro and Penafiel. The lines are completely electrified and the service is efficient, serving over 24 million passengers in 2019.

The Commuter rail service in Porto is well connected with bus and metro service in the city, linking with lines A (Blue line), B (Red line), C (Green line), E (Violet Line) and F (Orange Line) of metro service in Campanhã Station and with line D (Yellow line) in São Bento Station.

A fifth line was inaugurated in September 2009, Leixões line, connecting Porto to Leixões. This line closed again in 2011. And reopened again in 2025

In 2018, a study was launched into a new 36.5 km rail line branching from Valongo on the Linha de Caide to Felgueiras, with an expectedly cost of €300 million.

All urban rail in the Lisbon metro area is integrated in the Andante Card system of tickets.

== Metropolitan Coimbra network ==
Since the closure by Comboios de Portugal of the lines from Coimbra to Lousã – Miranda do Corvo (Ramal da Lousã), in 2004, and Coimbra to Figueira da Foz via Cantanhede (Ramal da Figueira da Foz) in 2011, the Urbanos Coimbra service now only consists of the Baixo Mondego corridor, from Coimbra to Figueira da Foz via Montemor-o-Velho (Ramal de Alfarelos of the Linha do Norte, Linha do Oeste and Ramal da Lousã).

The Ramal da Lousã line was converted to a BRT system opened in 2025, called Metro Mondego

== See also ==
- List of rapid transit systems
- List of suburban and commuter rail systems
- Lisbon Metro
- Porto Metro
- Metro Mondego
