= Nuno Reis (graffiti artist) =

Portuguese street artist

Nomen
- Born: Nuno Reis; 2 March 1974; Luanda, Angola
- Died: 4 August 2022 (aged 48); Portugal
- Known for: Street art, Murals, Graffiti

Nuno Reis (2 March 1974 – 4 August 2022), better known by his alias Nomen, was a Portuguese graffiti artist. Born in Angola and later based in Portugal, he was a self-taught practitioner and a co-founder of the graffiti crew Double Trouble alongside fellow artists Ram and Utopia.

== Biography ==
Nuno Reis was born in Angola on 2 March 1974 and relocated to Portugal at age two. He developed an interest in mural art at age 14, later becoming a pivotal figure in Portugal's graffiti movement. In 1989, he created his first public works on walls and trains along the Cascais line near Carcavelos, cementing his status as one of the country's graffiti pioneers.

After years of activity in the underground scene, Reis transitioned to professional artistry, gaining recognition for his commissioned projects. He collaborated with governments and businesses, to produce works ranging from small murals to large-scale installations on buildings, industrial structures, and canvas. His art was exhibited internationally, including in Panama (2015), Israel (2017), and France (2019).

Reis described himself as a "style swinger," reflecting his versatile and prolific output across mediums. He died in Portugal on 4 August 2022 at age 48.

== Style ==
Reis primarily employed acrylic spray paint, a medium that prioritizes boldness and immediacy over intricate detail. During his early career, he utilized classical street art compositions, often incorporating thematic social criticism. His later works retained foundational elements of typography and graffiti, juxtaposed with subjects such as celebrities, fantasy characters, film icons, and vibrant 3D-text, all rendered in his signature street art aesthetic.

== Murals ==
Reis' murals frequently address social and political themes such as injustice, human rights, and environmental awareness, functioning as public commentaries aimed at prompting reflection on societal issues.

=== Selected works ===
- Batman Slapping Robin (2010): Created for a competition in Amadora, Portugal, this mural reimagines the viral meme through Reis’ graffiti lens.
- Angela Merkel Manipulating Portuguese politicians as Puppets (2012): A collaborative work with artists Slap and Kurtz, produced ahead of Merkel's visit to Lisbon, critiquing political power dynamics.
- Black Girl Taking Off a White Mask (2014): Located on a social housing building in Lisbon's Quinta do Mocho neighborhood, this piece depicts a Black girl removing a white mask. It critiques systemic stigmatization, referencing residents' reported experiences of shame and concealment regarding their community. Created during the O Bairro i o Mundo festival, it has since become a local landmark.

== Paintings ==
Reis' figurative paintings blend abstract and realistic elements, depicting subjects such as Pablo Picasso, Marilyn Monroe, and Catherine Zeta-Jones, and fictional characters like Mickey Mouse and Super Mario. These figures are often set against dynamic abstract backgrounds characterized by vibrant colors and geometric shapes. Alongside signing his works with his alias "Nomen", he frequently incorporated the name into the compositions themselves, weaving it into the subjects or backgrounds.

=== Notable series and works ===
- Girl from Ipanema: A series exploring cultural iconography.
- Feat. Roy Lichtenstein: Homage to pop art aesthetics.
- The Saint: Thematic focus on mythologized figures.
- Marilyn in Wonderland: Surreal reinterpretation of Monroe.
- Catherine Zeta-Jones Universe: Celebrity portraiture fused with abstract motifs.

== Exhibitions ==
Reis' works were exhibited internationally, including in France, Israel, Panama, and Qatar. Weeks before his death, his art was featured at Le Carrousel du Louvre in Paris during the Salon International de l'Art Contemporain from 8–10 April 2022.

== Images ==
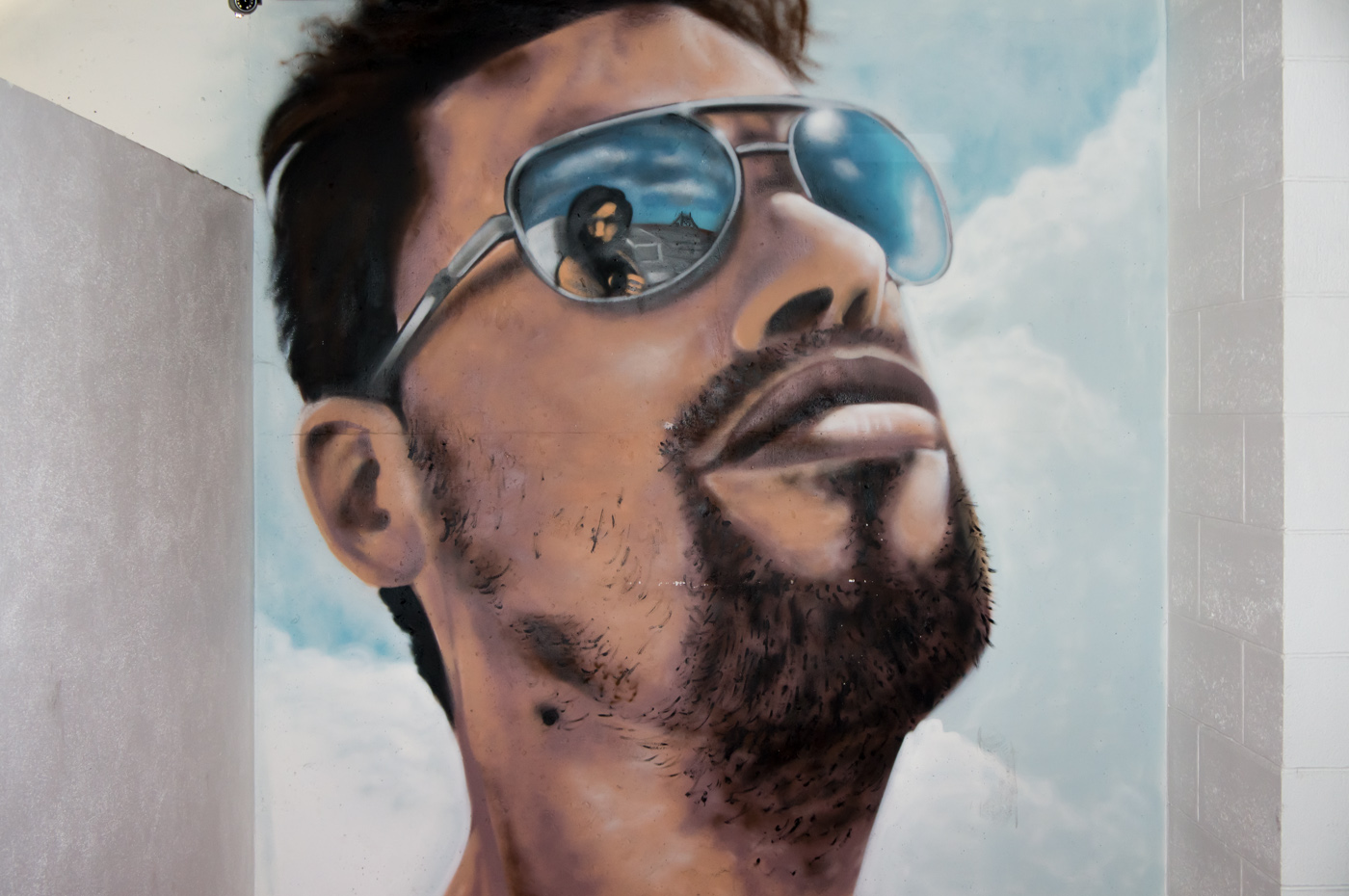

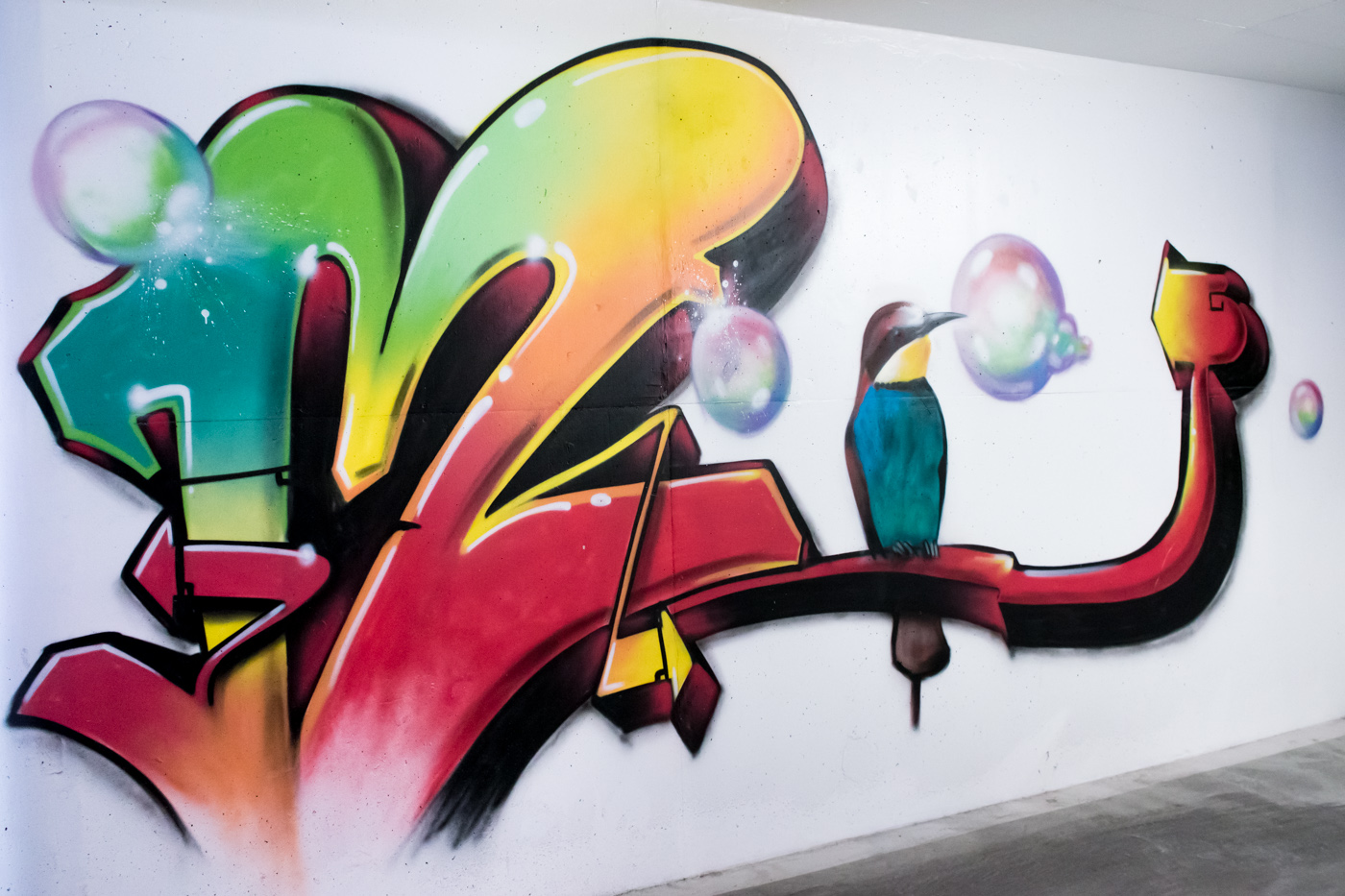

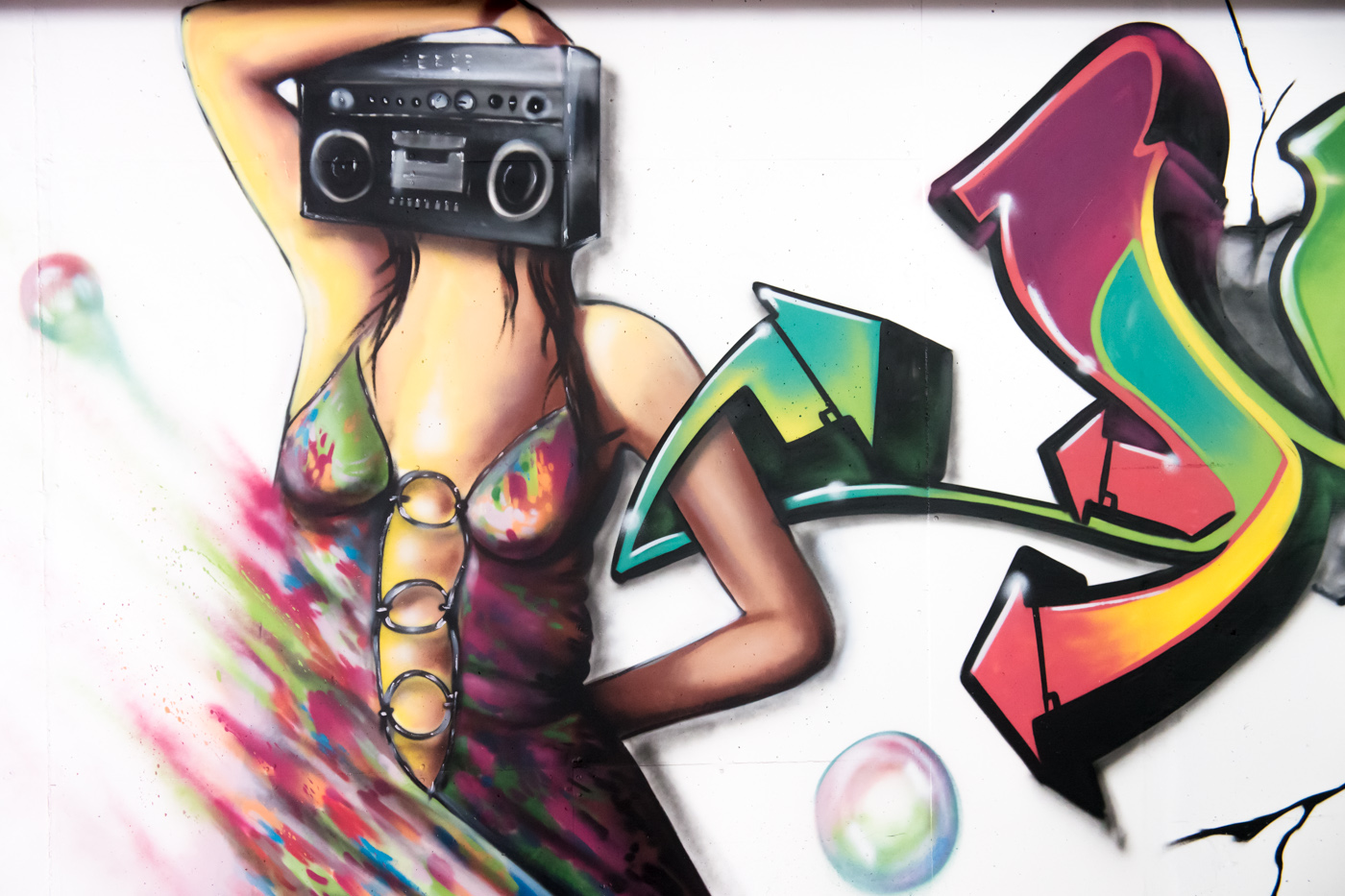

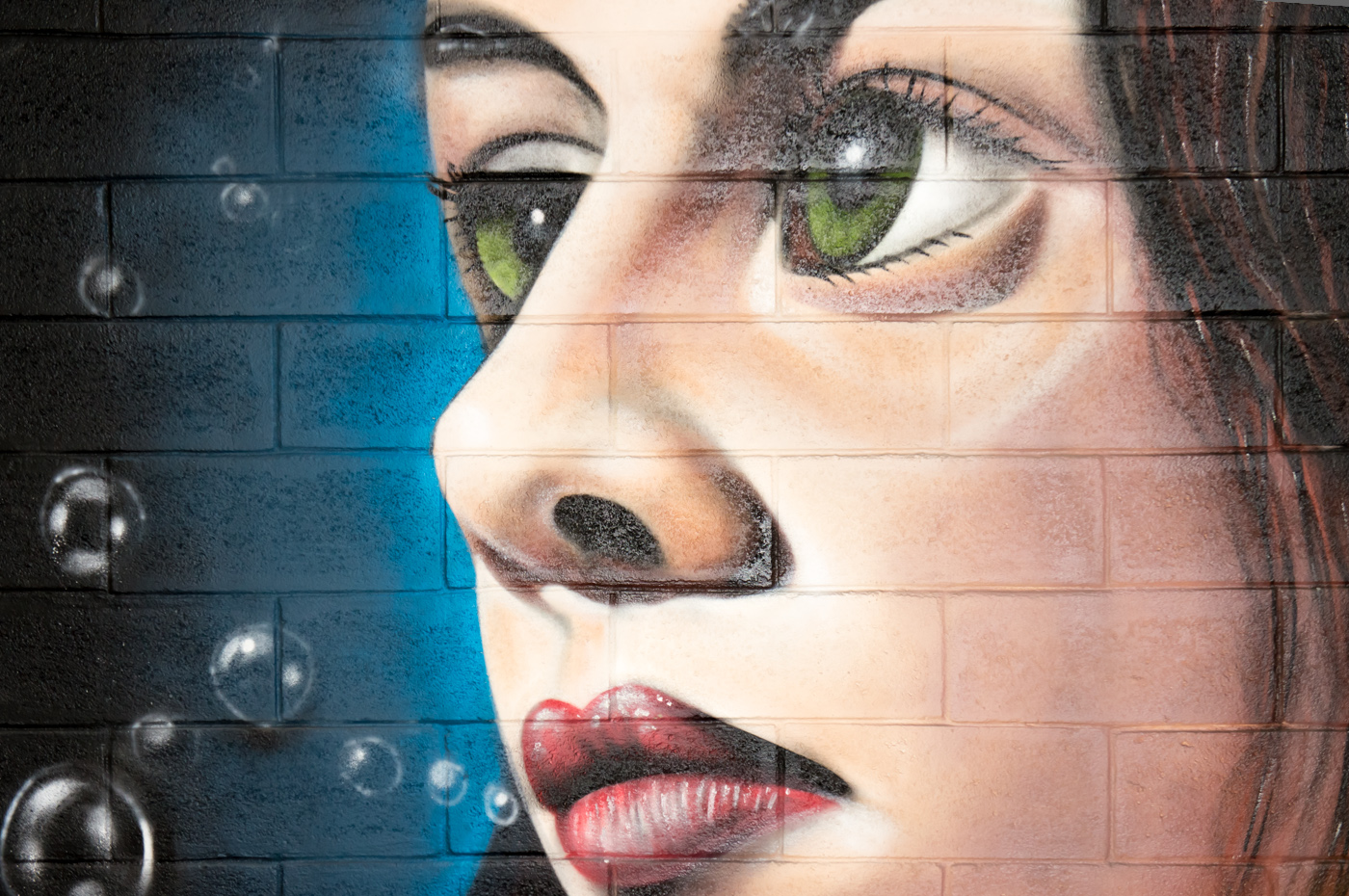

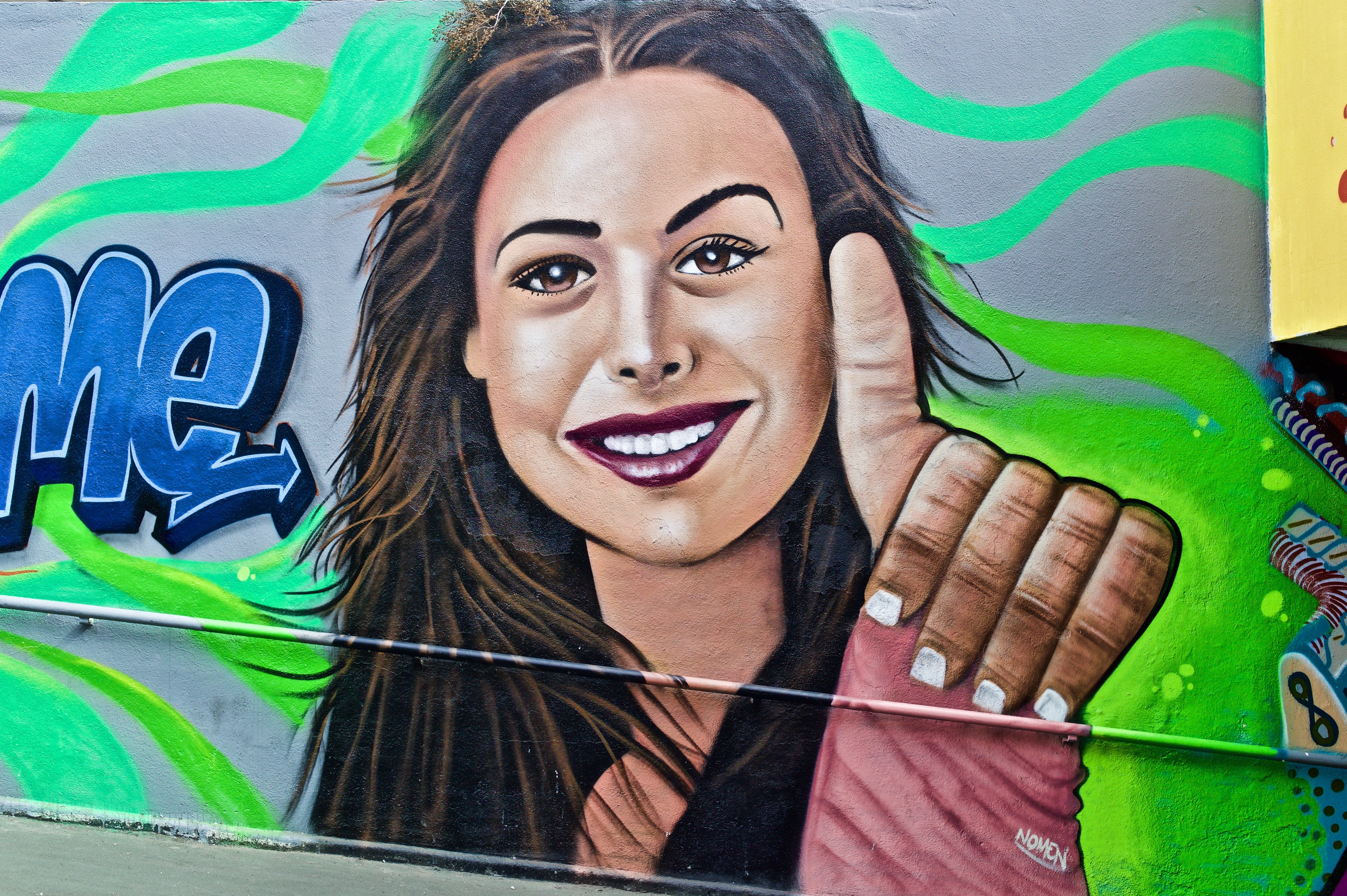

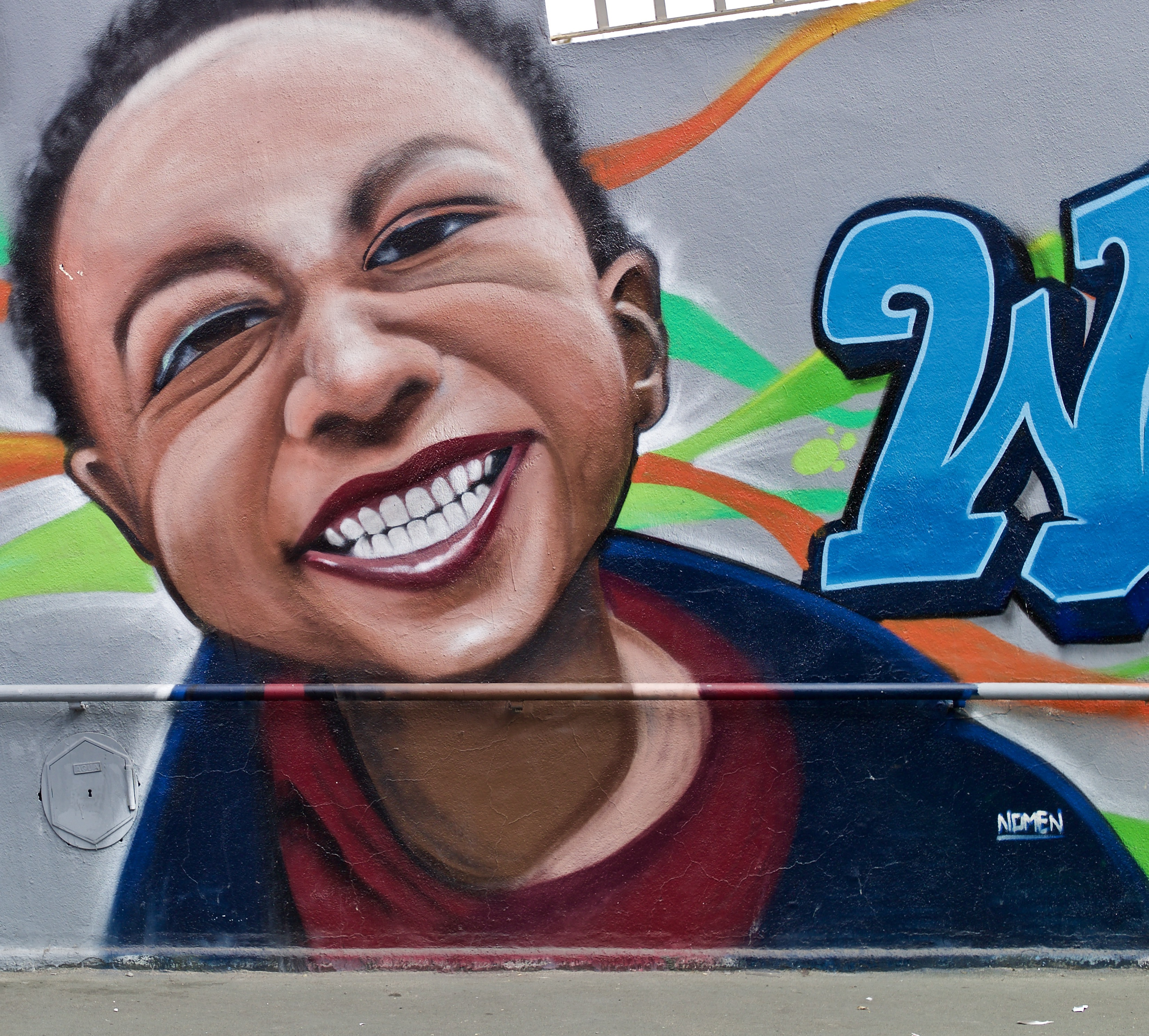

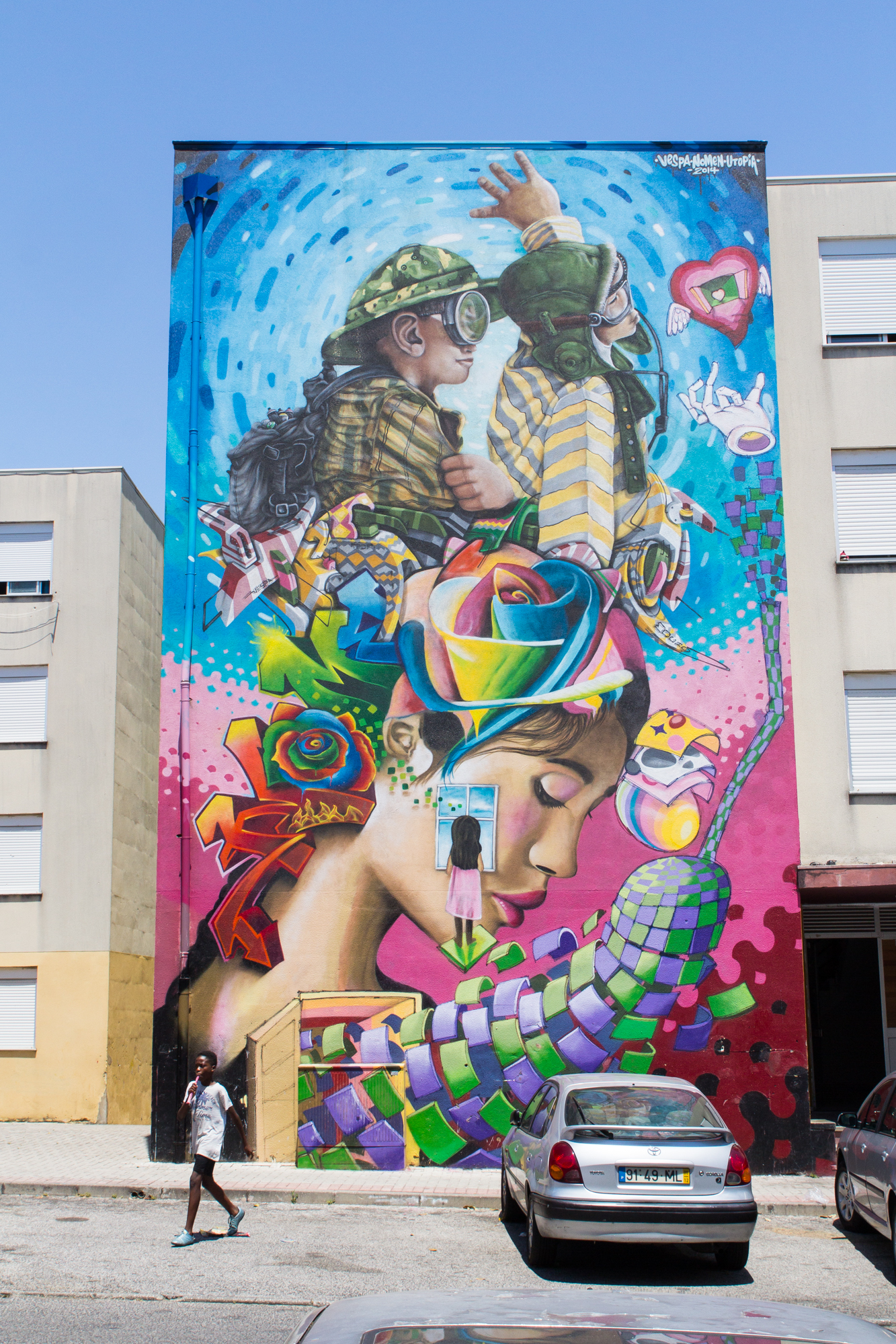
