= Cais do Sodré railway station =

Railway station in Portugal

Cais do Sodré
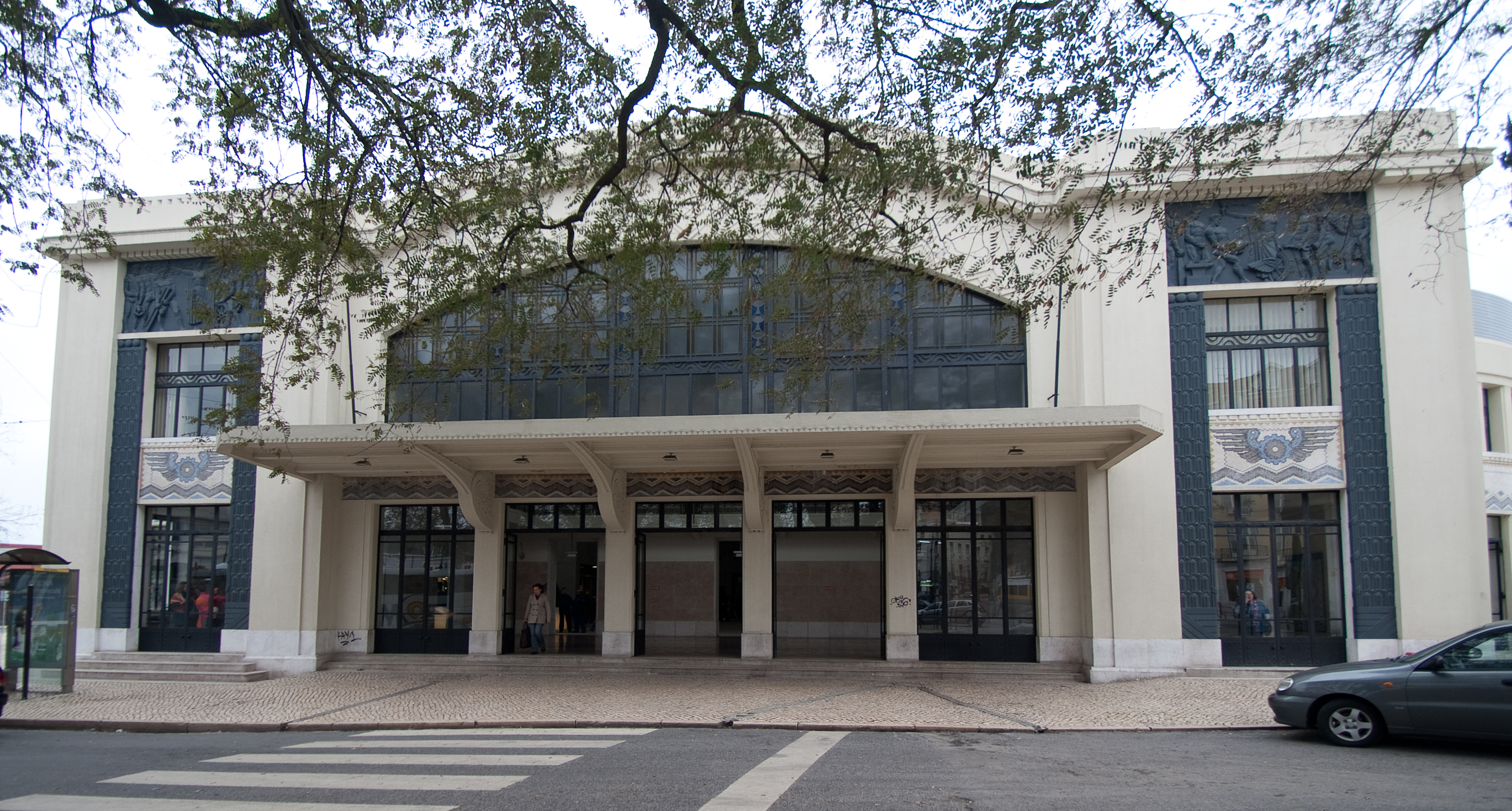
- The station's main façade facing Praça Duque da Terceira

General information
- Location: Avenida 24 de Julho; Misericórdia, Lisbon; Portugal
- Coordinates: 38°42′21″N 9°08′39″W
- Elevation: 10 m (33 ft)
- System: CP Lisboa
- Owner: Portuguese Republic
- Operator: Infraestruturas de Portugal (South)
- Line: Cascais Line
- Platforms: 2 side platforms + 2 island platforms
- Tracks: 6
- Train operators: Comboios de Portugal
- Connections: Cais do Sodré (metro); Cais do Sodré (river services); Buses and trams Taxi rank

Construction
- Structure type: Masonry
- Accessible: Yes
- Architect: Porfírio Pardal Monteiro (original); Nuno Teotónio Pereira (renovation)
- Architectural style: Art deco

Other information
- Station code: CSO; 69005
- Fare zone: Lisbon
- Classification: E (station), A-class

History
- Opened: 4 September 1895; 18 August 1928 (current building)
- Rebuilt: 1998 (renovated)
- Electrified: 15 August 1928

Services
Preceding station	Lisbon CP	Following station
Alcântara-Mar towards Cascais	Cascais Line Semi-Rapid	Terminus
Santos towards Cascais	Cascais Line	Terminus
Santos towards Oeiras	Cascais Line	Terminus
Location

The Cais do Sodré Railway Station (European Portuguese: [ˈkajʒ ðu suˈðɾɛ]) is an intermodal railway station in the civil parish of Misericórdia, in the municipality of Lisbon, serving as the terminus of the suburban route to the resort town Cascais.

== History ==
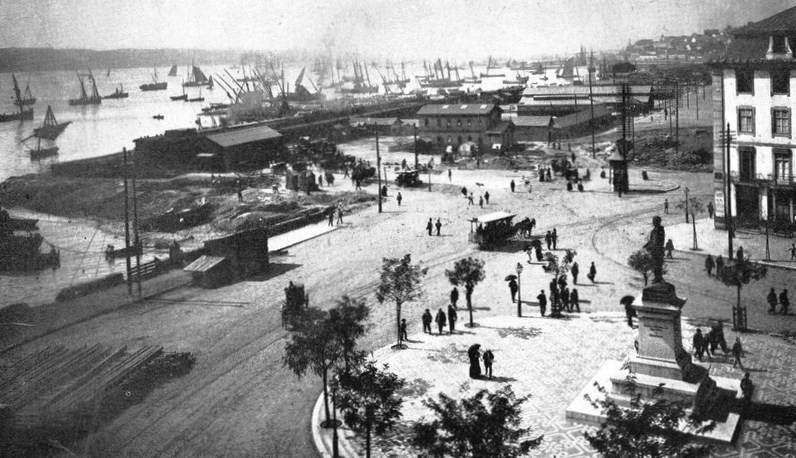
A perspective of Cais do Sodré at the end of the 19th Century

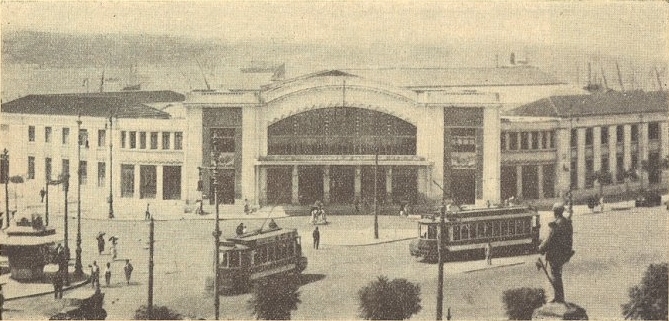
A view of the front facade of Cais de Sodré station in 1936

In 1925, the company Sociedade Estoril elaborated a project for a station along the margin of the civil parish of São Paulo.

The station was completed and inaugurated on 18 August 1928.

A new roof was built over the platforms in 1960, but on 28 May 1963 this collapsed while one train was loading and another was unloading. About 50 people were killed and many more injured.

In 1993, Cais do Sodré metro station was opened to link the railway station, a project of Nuno Teotónio Pereira, who was contracted in 1998 to remodel the site. He was brought back in 2000, in order to construct the river terminal along the northern margin of the Tagus.

On 4 August 1995, there was a proposal to classify the railway station by URBE. A dispatch to begin the classification process was instituted on 20 OCtober 2004, by the vice-president of IPPAR, which was later amended on 24 August 2007 (to status of Imóvel de Interesse Público), and later, on 23 November 2011, Conselho Nacional de Cultura (National Council of Culture) proposed its classification as a Monumento de Interesse Público (Monument of Public Interest). It was on 30 January 2012, when the project was descively classified and its area of protection designated (Announcement 1216/2012, Diário da República, Série 2, 15).

== Architecture ==
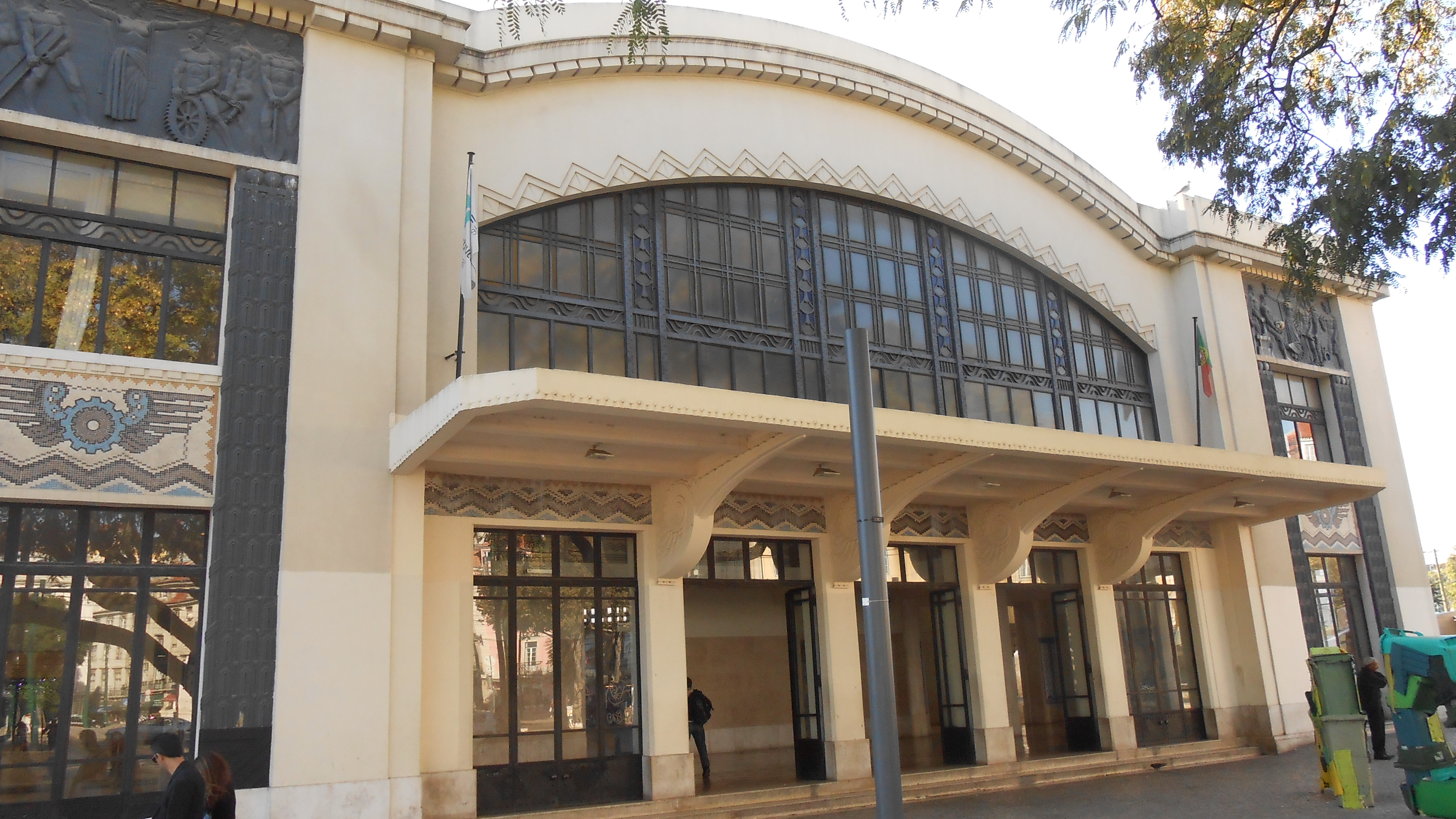
The front facade of Cais de Sodré

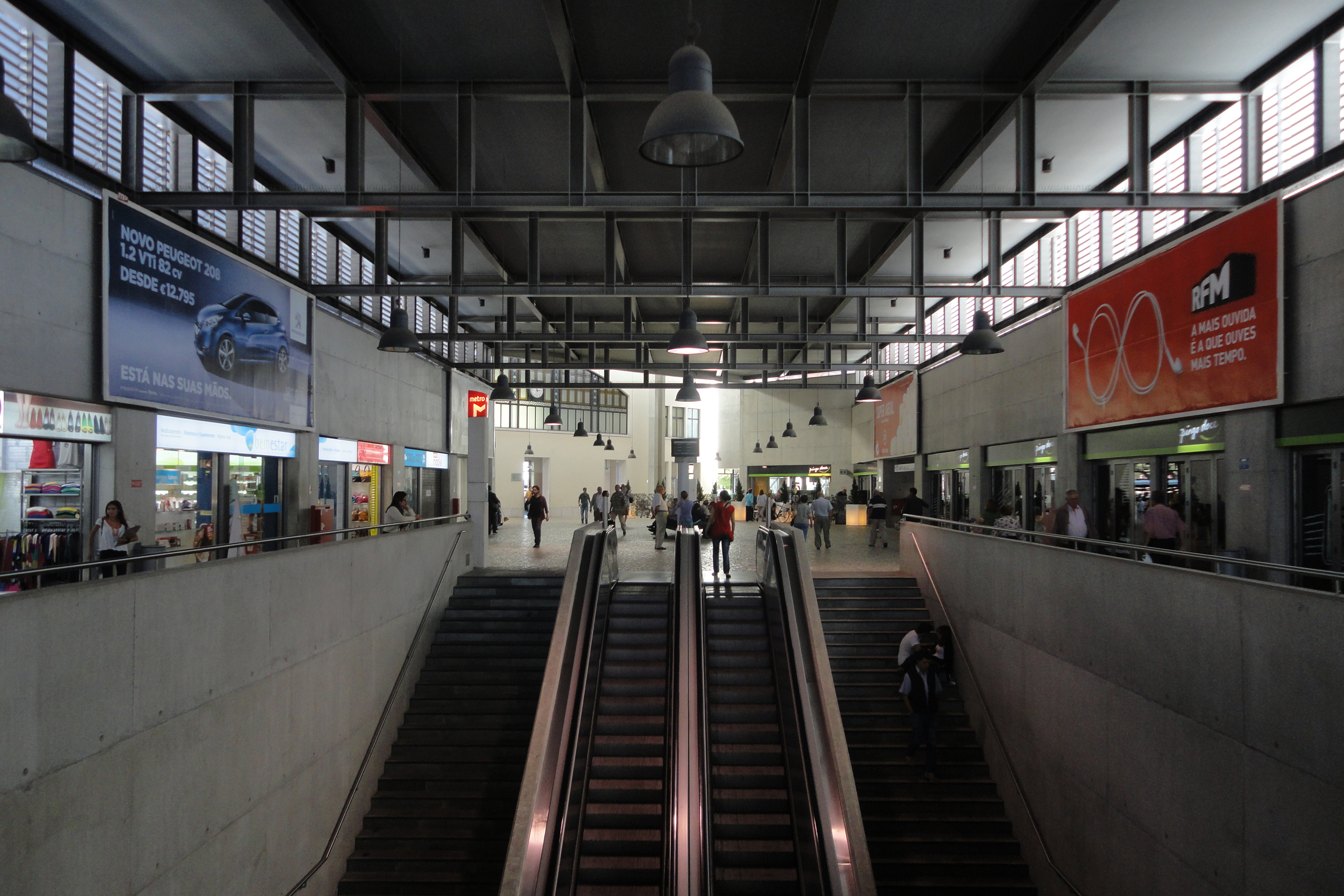
The interior of the station between floors

It is an inter-modal exchange connecting the Lisbon Metro, rail-lines and river terminal centre, a complex situated at the Duque de Terceira square. The station is adjacent to the Lisbon Metro station (which is the terminus for the Metro's Green Line) and isolated along the northern margin of Tagus River, with ferry service to Cacilhas, Seixal and Montijo (the Transtejo & Soflusa service).

The station comprises a building with three bodies juxtapositioned in an "U" design, with the steel and tiled central hall covering the rail-lines that parallel the Tagus River and Avenida 24 de Julho. The main hall, that includes the vestibule ticket offices, is a rectangular body with terrace oriented to the northeast. Its main facade is divided into three sections with the identical lateral bodies of smaller dimensions, with the central composed of five ample bodies on the first floor, decorated by extensive rectangular flaps supported by four corbels. To the second floor, is an ample surface topped by depressed arch, decorated by small geometric elements in triangular forms. The lateral bodies, that include one per floor are demarcated and separated by a panel of rectangular mosaics. Flanking the pans, are striated bronze columns that extend down to the bas-relief of the same material that finishes the span of the second floor. To finish off the facade, there is a paltibanda with cornice in a collapsed arch.

Attached to the main building are two similar annex bodies with identical facades, consisting of two floors of simple rectangular spans decorated in intervals by geometric mosaic panels. The northern rectangular body, covered in tile, has an extensive facade that parallels the public roadway. The eastern annex is an "L"-shape building with lateral facade oriented to the south that correspond to administrative services. Juxtapositioned to the main body on either side are triangular spans with curved apex that resembles the decorative discourse of the main facades.

The Art Deco design was by Porfírio Pardal Monteiro (1897–1957) and the Metro station is decorated with works by abstract artist António Dacosta, in addition to an underground waterfall.

== Surrounding area ==
The station is located directly north of the Tagus, and provides access to the waterfront area. The Time Out Market Lisboa is located slightly north of the station.
