= Alcântara-Mar railway station =

Railway station in Lisbon, Portugal

Alcântara-Mar
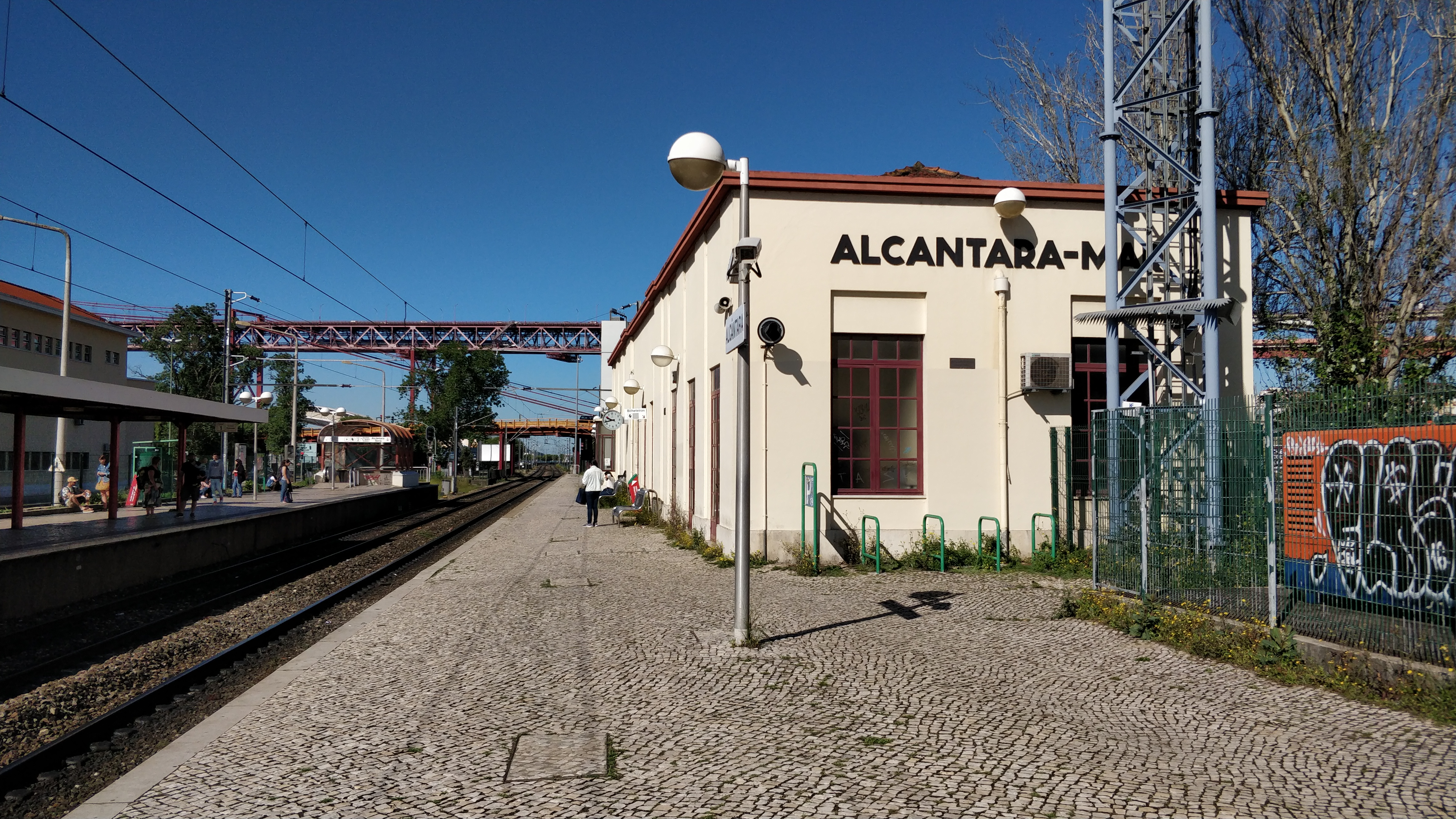
- Alcântara-Mar station in 2018

General information
- Location: Lisbon; Portugal
- Coordinates: 38°42′8.61″N 9°10′26.87″W
- Elevation: 8 m (26 ft)
- Owner: Infraestruturas de Portugal
- Operator: Lisbon CP
- Lines: Cascais Line; Cintura Line
- Distance: 2.668 km (1.658 mi) on the Cascais Line; 0.975 km (0.606 mi) on the Cintura Line
- Platforms: 2
- Tracks: 2 passenger tracks and 3 sidings

Construction
- Accessible: Yes

Other information
- Station code: 69039

History
- Opened: 6 December 1890; 135 years ago
- Electrified: 1926
Location

Alcântara-Mar railway station (Estação Ferroviária de Alcântara-Mar) is a railway station on the Cascais and (nominally) Cintura lines. It serves the civil parish of Alcântara in Lisbon, Portugal. The station opened on 6 December 1890 as the provisional terminus of the Cascais branch. The branch to Alcântara-Terra opened in 1891. The station was extensively remodelled in the 1920s: the tracks were electrified and a new passenger building, designed by architect Cottinelli Telmo, was constructed.

== History ==
A charter dated 9 April 1887 authorised the Royal Company of Portuguese Railways to build a railway along the River Tagus from Santa Apolónia railway station to Alcântara, with a possible extension to Cascais. The first section of the Cascais branch, between Pedrouços and Cascais opened on 30 September 1889. It was extended to Alcântara-Mar on 6 December 1890, connected to Alcântara-Terra in 1891, and extended east to Cais do Sodré in 1895.

The line between Belém and Alcântara-Mar was made double-track in 1896, followed by the section between Alcântara-Mar and Cais do Sodré in 1897. A successful special train from Alcântara-Mar to Sintra for cruise-ship passengers contributed to the rerouting of the Sud Express through the station once a week from 1898, giving passengers direct access to the quay.

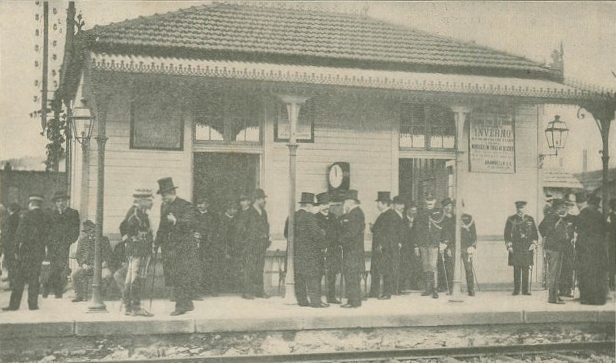
Government ministers at Alcântara-Mar station in 1904, awaiting the arrival of the royal train.

The Portuguese Railway Company leased operation of the Cascais Line to the Sociedade Estoril starting in 1918. The line was electrified in 1926, and between 1927 and 1928 Cottinelli Telmo designed a new Modernist passenger building for Alcântara-Mar. From 1 July 1938, services from the closed Santo Amaro river station were transferred to new facilities at Alcântara-Mar. Materials from the former station were also reused to construct an ancillary building there.

In 1939, the Cascais Line was realigned between Alcântara and Cruz Quebrada to accommodate construction of the coastal road between Lisbon and Cascais. The work reached the Belém–Alcântara section in 1940. Further modernisation of the adjoining sections towards Belém and Cais do Sodré began in 1955.

The Sociedade Estoril ceased operating the Cascais Line in 1976, when direct management passed back to Caminhos de Ferro Portugueses, which has run the line since.

In 1991, a segregated pedestrian route was built between Alcântara-Mar and Alcântara-Terra, which had recently reopened to passenger traffic. It consisted of an underpass beneath Avenida da Índia followed by the Alcântara elevated footbridge; the latter was demolished in 2008. In December 2009, the pedestrian underpass was temporarily closed because of flooding.

== Location and infrastructure ==
The passenger building stands on the north side of the tracks, on the right when travelling towards Cascais.

The station has two electrified running tracks, designated VA1 and VD2. Both are 228 m (748 ft) long and are served by platforms measuring 217 m (712 ft) and 207 m (679 ft), respectively. Both platforms are 110 cm (43 in) high; these measurements are essentially unchanged from those recorded in previous decades. There are also three unelectrified sidings, designated Areal 1, Areal 2 and Areal 3, with lengths ranging from 355 to 402 m (1,165 to 1,319 ft). The private Liscont branch joins the national rail network at the station.

Although the station is connected to the Cintura line, this is only of a single-track, unelectrified connection that rarely sees passenger services. However, there are plans to renovate it and return it to regular use.

== Services ==
According to the 2023 timetable, the station is served by CP urban passenger trains on the Cascais Line. On a typical weekday, 102 trains run in each direction between the station and Cais do Sodré; 32 of these terminate at Oeiras railway station|Oeiras, while the remainder run to Cascais .

== Gallery ==
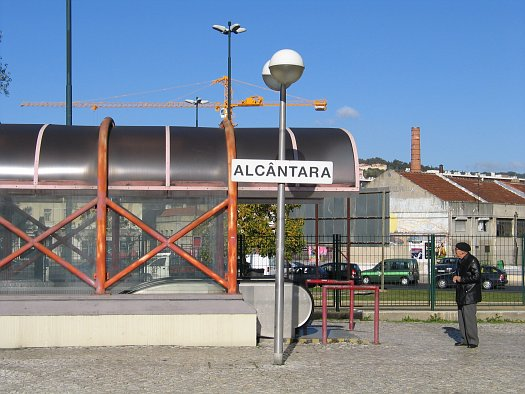
Entrance to the underpass beneath Avenida da Índia at Alcântara-Mar station

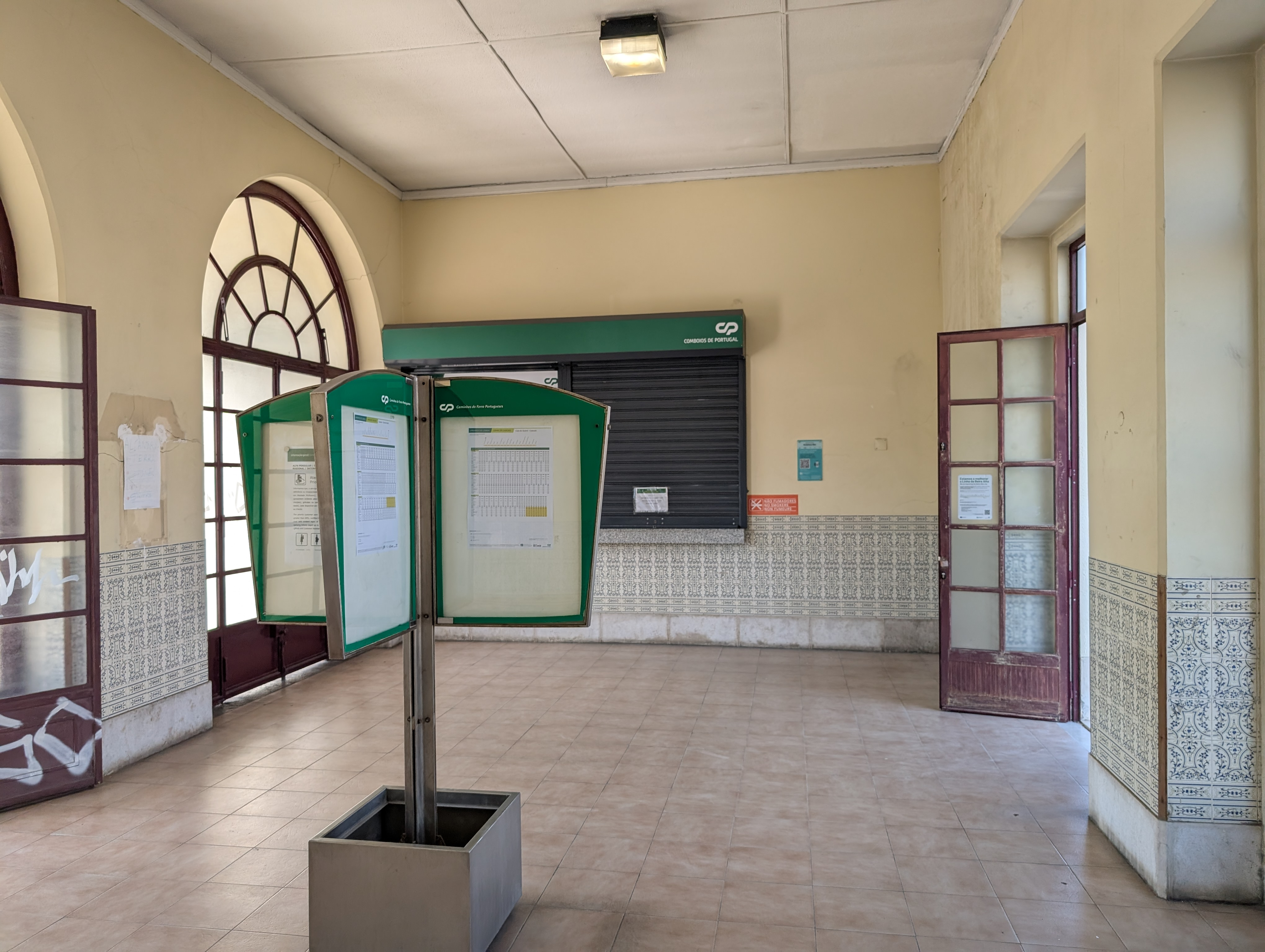
Ticket office and waiting hall at Alcântara-Mar Railway Station in Lisbon, Portugal.

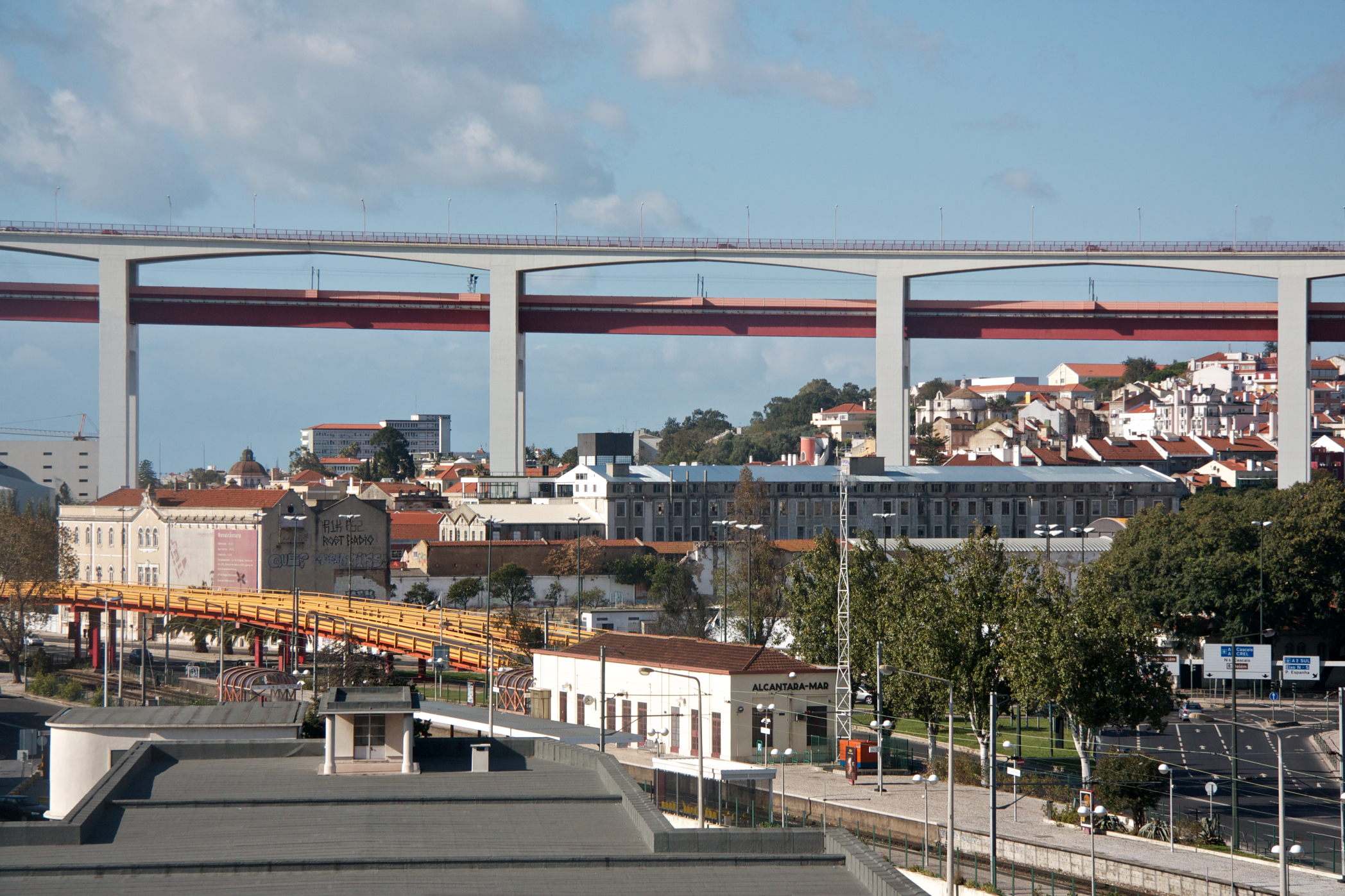
View of the station from the east, with the onramp of the 25 de Abril Bridge looming in the background.

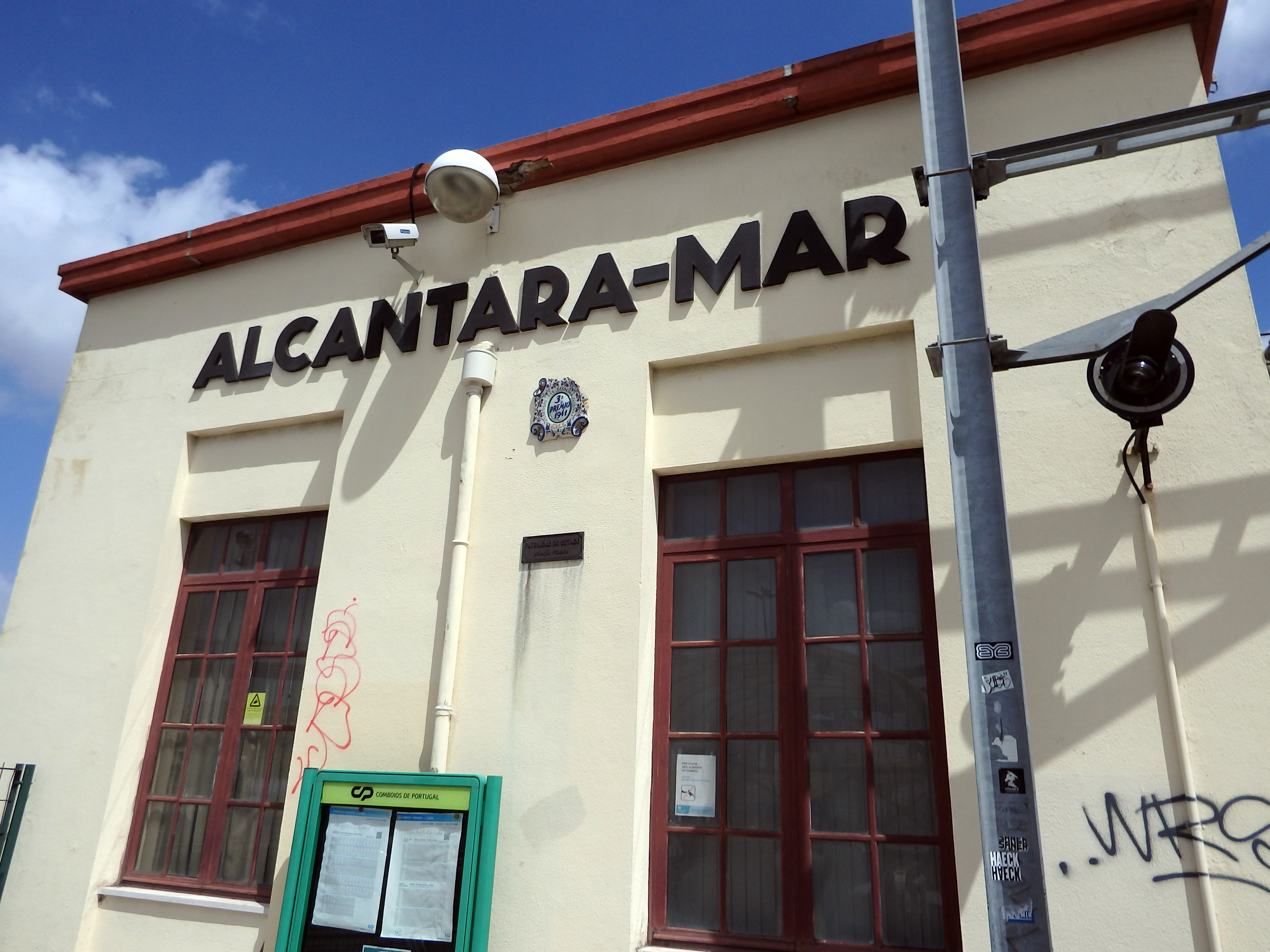
Platform front of the station building.

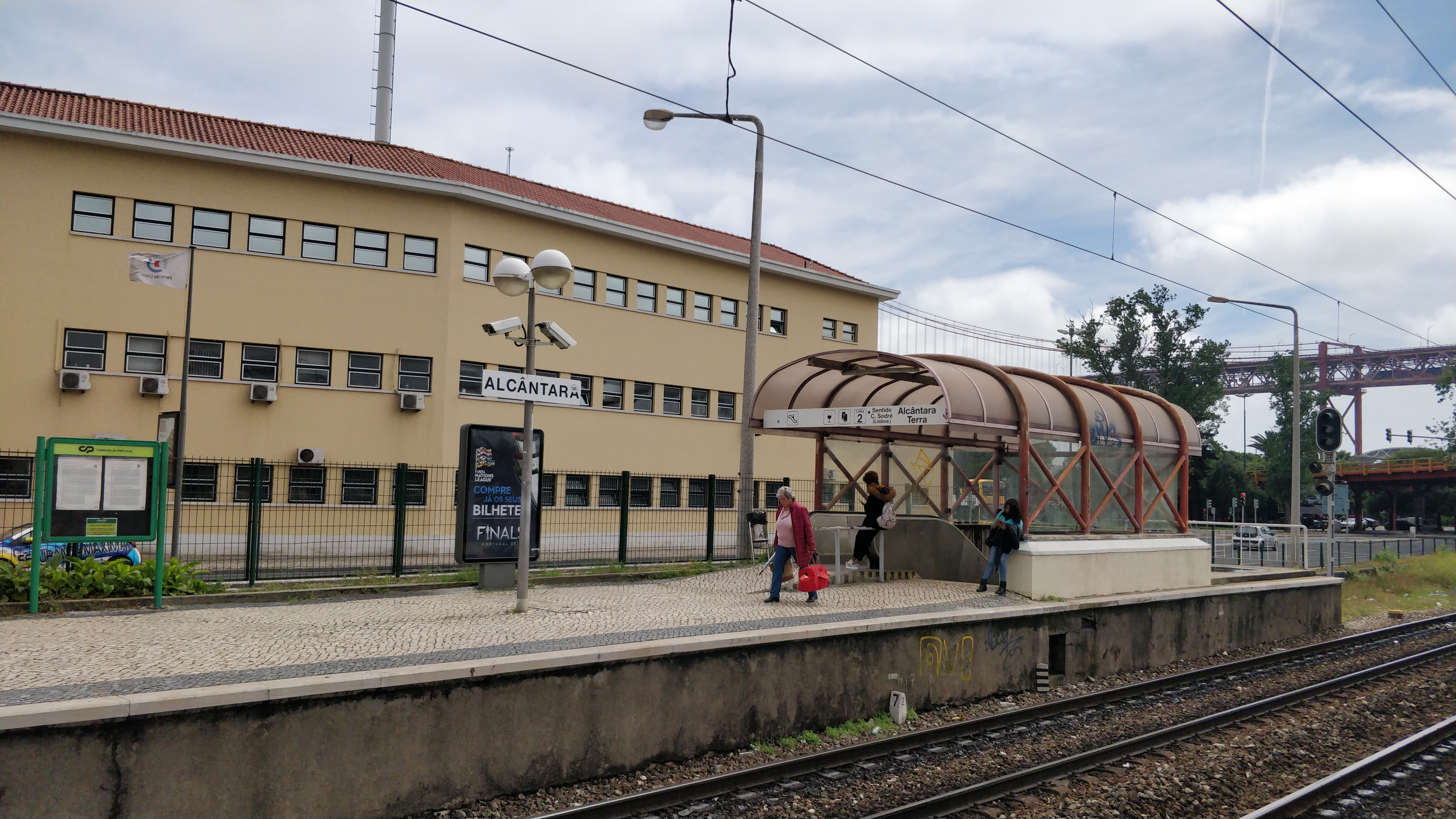
View over the platforms

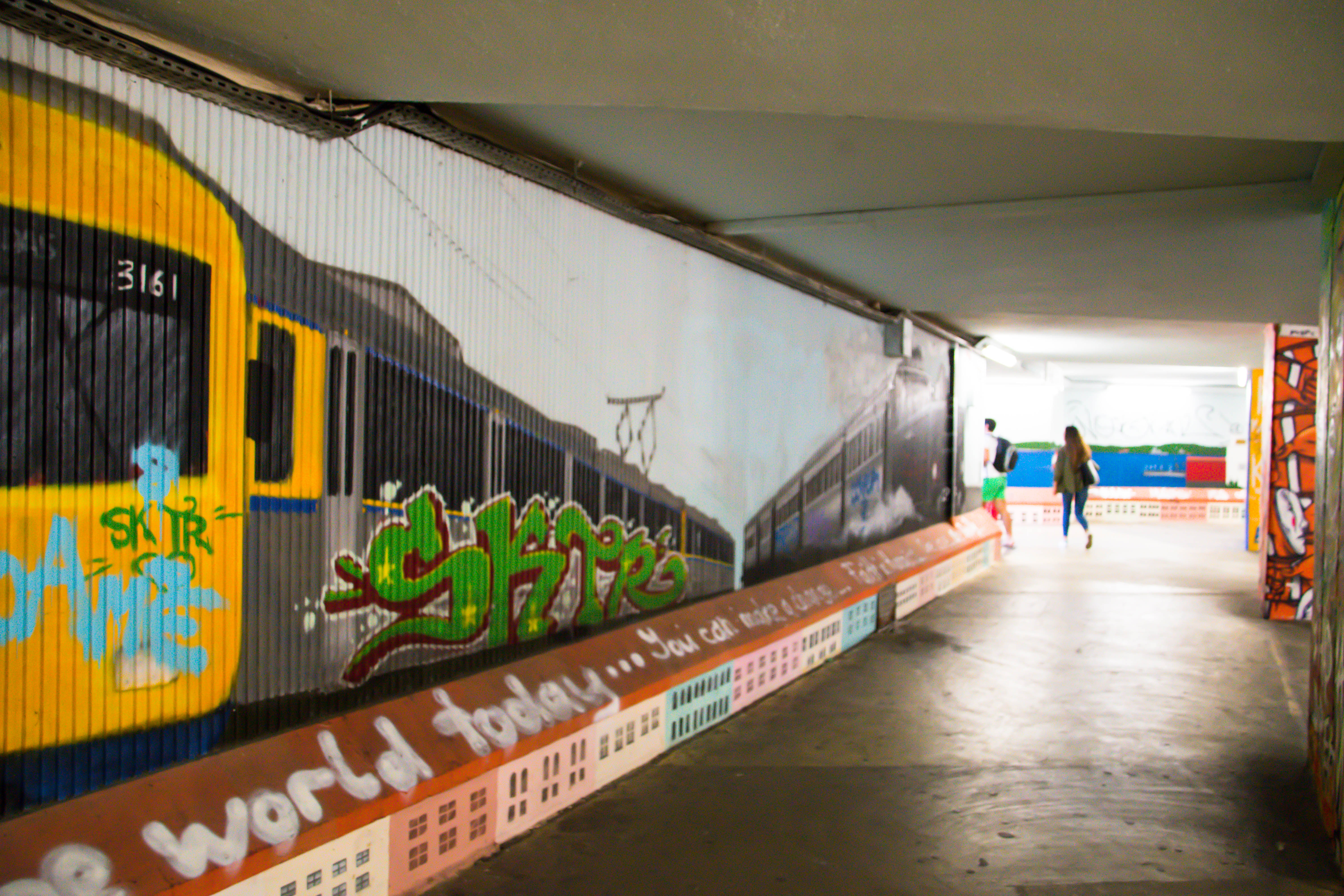
Station underpass

== See also ==
- Comboios de Portugal
- Infraestruturas de Portugal
- Rail transport in Portugal

== Bibliography ==
- Barreto, António; Mónica, Maria Filomena (1999). Dicionário de História de Portugal: Suplemento A/E (in Portuguese). Vol. 7 (1st ed.). Lisbon: Livraria Figueirinhas. p. 714. ISBN 972-661-159-8.
- Henriques, João Miguel (2001). Cascais: Do Final da Monarquia ao Alvorecer da República (1908–1914) (in Portuguese). Cascais: Câmara Municipal de Cascais and Edições Colibri. p. 215. ISBN 972-772-268-7.
- Martins, João; Brion, Madalena; Sousa, Miguel; et al. (1996). O Caminho de Ferro Revisitado: O Caminho de Ferro em Portugal de 1856 a 1996 (in Portuguese). Lisbon: Caminhos de Ferro Portugueses. p. 446.
- Reis, Francisco; Gomes, Rosa; Gomes, Gilberto; et al. (2006). Os Caminhos de Ferro Portugueses 1856–2006 (in Portuguese). Lisbon: CP – Comboios de Portugal and Público – Comunicação Social S.A. p. 238. ISBN 989-619-078-X.
