= Portuguese frigate Dom Fernando II e Glória =

Portuguese Navy sailing frigate (1843–1940)

Coordinates: 38.6860763°N 9.1469498°W

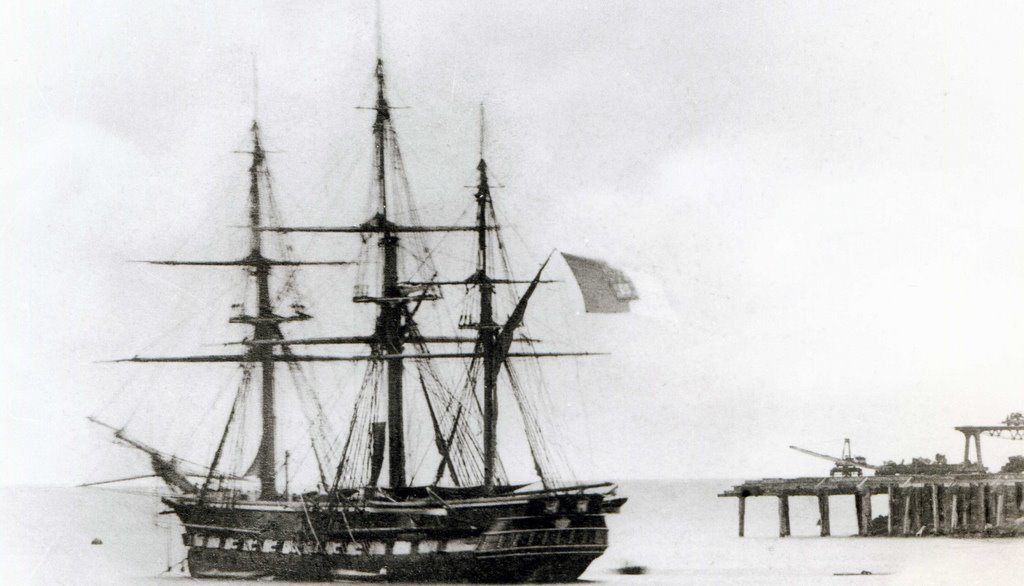
- Dom Fernando II e Glória, anchored in Ponta Delgada, Azores, during her last sea mission in 1878

History

Portugal
- Name: Dom Fernando II e Glória
- Ordered: 1821
- Builder: Shipyards of the Royal Navy Arsenal at Daman, Portuguese India
- Launched: 22 October 1843
- Maiden voyage: 2 February 1845
- In service: 1845
- Status: Preserved as a museum ship in Almada, Portugal

General characteristics
- Class & type: 50-gun frigate
- Displacement: 1,849.16 tons
- Length: 284 ft (87 m)
- Beam: 42 ft (13 m)
- Draught: 21 ft (6.4 m)
- Propulsion: Sails - 22,190 ft^{2} (2,062 m^{2})
- Sail plan: Full-rigged ship
- Speed: 8 knots (15 km/h; 9.2 mph)
- Boats & landing craft carried: 1 × captain's gig; 2 × longboats; 1 × pinnace; 1 × launch
- Complement: 145 to 379 crew. 270 passengers.
- Armament: Gun deck: 28 × 18 pounder (8 kg) long gun; Deck: 20 × 32 pounder (15 kg) carronade; Forecastle: 2 × 12 pounder (5 kg) bow chasers

Dom Fernando II e Glória is a wooden-hulled, 50-gun frigate of the Portuguese Navy. She was launched in 1843 and made her maiden voyage in 1845. Built at the shipyard of Daman in Portuguese India, it was Portugal's last sailing warship to be built and also the last ship that undertook the Carreira da Índia (India Run), a regular military line that connected Portugal to its colonies in India since the beginning of the 16th century.

In 1865 she became the navy's replacement Artillery School training ship, a role she fulfilled until 1940. The ship remained in active service until 1878 however, when she made her last sea voyage, having travelled more than 100,000 miles, the equivalent of five circumnavigations of the world.

After long service it was almost destroyed by a fire in 1963 with the burned wooden-hull remaining beached at the mud-flats of the river Tagus for the next 29 years. Finally in 1990 the Portuguese Navy decided to restore her to her appearance in the 1850s. During the World Exhibition of 1998 the ship remained in Lisbon as a museum ship on the dependency of the Navy Museum, being classified as an Auxiliary Navy Unit (UAM 203). Since 2008, the ship lies on the southern margin of the Tagus river in Cacilhas, Almada.

== Construction ==
In 1821, the Intendant of the Royal Navy of Goa, Cândido José Mourão Garcez Palha, proposed to the Portuguese government the construction of a new frigate in the Portuguese colony of Daman, who possessed to the east a large forest of teak wood in Nagar-Aveli, considered to be an excellent wood for ship building. The authorization for the construction was given in 1824, by the Portuguese king João VI. The civil war period and the political and economical problems in Portugal, delayed the construction for several times throughout the years. She was built in the shipyards of the Royal Navy Arsenal under the supervision of the naval builder engineer Gil José da Conceição, being involved in its construction both Portuguese and Indian workers. She was finally launched in 1843 and was towed to Goa for fitting out as a full-rigged ship.

She was named as a tribute to the king consort of Portugal Ferdinand II, husband of the Portuguese Queen Maria II, and to Our Lady of Glory, a figure of special devotion among the Catholic population of Goa.

The frigate was noted for her spacious accommodations, a critical factor on voyages that could take three months or even more without an intermediate port of call.

== Service ==
The maiden voyage took place between 2 February and 4 July 1845 under the command of Captain Torcato José Marques, with a crew of 145 men, connecting Goa to Lisbon. Since then it was used on several types of missions over the years:

- Transporting military units, settlers, colonial administrators throughout the Empire, and even degredados to the Portuguese colonies in Africa and India.
- Transporting in 1852 to the Portuguese island of Madeira, the Empress consort of Brazil Amélie of Leuchtenberg and her daughter Princess Maria Amélia of Brazil, who was sick with tuberculosis and was looking for a good climate to recover from her disease, dying however five months after the arrival.
- Transporting to Angola in 1854 the Portuguese explorer António da Silva Porto and the thirteen members of his expedition after their completion of the crossing of Africa, from the coast of Angola to the coast of Mozambique.
- Participation in May 1855 as flagship of a Portuguese naval force in Ambriz, Angola, against a local rebellion.
- Participation in 1860 in the colonization of Huíla, Angola, transporting sheep and horses from South Africa to Angola.

The Dom Fernando II e Glória in the publication Ilustração Portuguesa in 1904, when she was serving as an Artillery School for the Portuguese Navy. Top left to bottom left: The Dom Fernando II e Glória. Sailors loading a Krupp gun. The Captain's quarters antechamber. Sailors aiming an Armstrong gun. Center: The Captain and officers of the ship. Top right to bottom right: Sailors firing a Canet cannon. Petty officers next to an Armstrong gun. The Captain's quarters. The ship's crew.

In 1865, she replaced the sailing ship Vasco da Gama as the Artillery School of the Portuguese Navy, conducting training missions up until 1878, when it completed her last training mission on sea in a voyage to the Azores islands. In this last voyage she rescued the crew of the American barque Lawrence Boston, which had caught fire off the Azores archipelago. After this, she remained permanently moored in Lisbon as the Naval Artillery School with significant modifications being made on her in 1889, with the replacement of her elegant masts, and the construction of two redoubts on both her sides for the placement of modern cannons, to better serve her role of artillery instruction unit.

In 1938 served as the flagship of the naval forces of Continental Portugal, based in the river Tagus.

== Fire and damage ==
In 1940, after being considered unfit for navy service, it became the headquarters of the Fragata Dom Fernando Welfare Institution (Obra Social da Fragata Dom Fernando) destined to give general education as well as teaching seamanship to underprivileged youth, up until 3 April 1963. On this day, during repair work, a huge fire erupted, partially destroying the ship's hull and structure. After the fire was extinguished, the frigate was towed to an area where the navigation on the river Tagus wouldn't be disturbed, remaining abandoned and half buried in the mud-flats for the next 29 years.

== Reconstruction ==
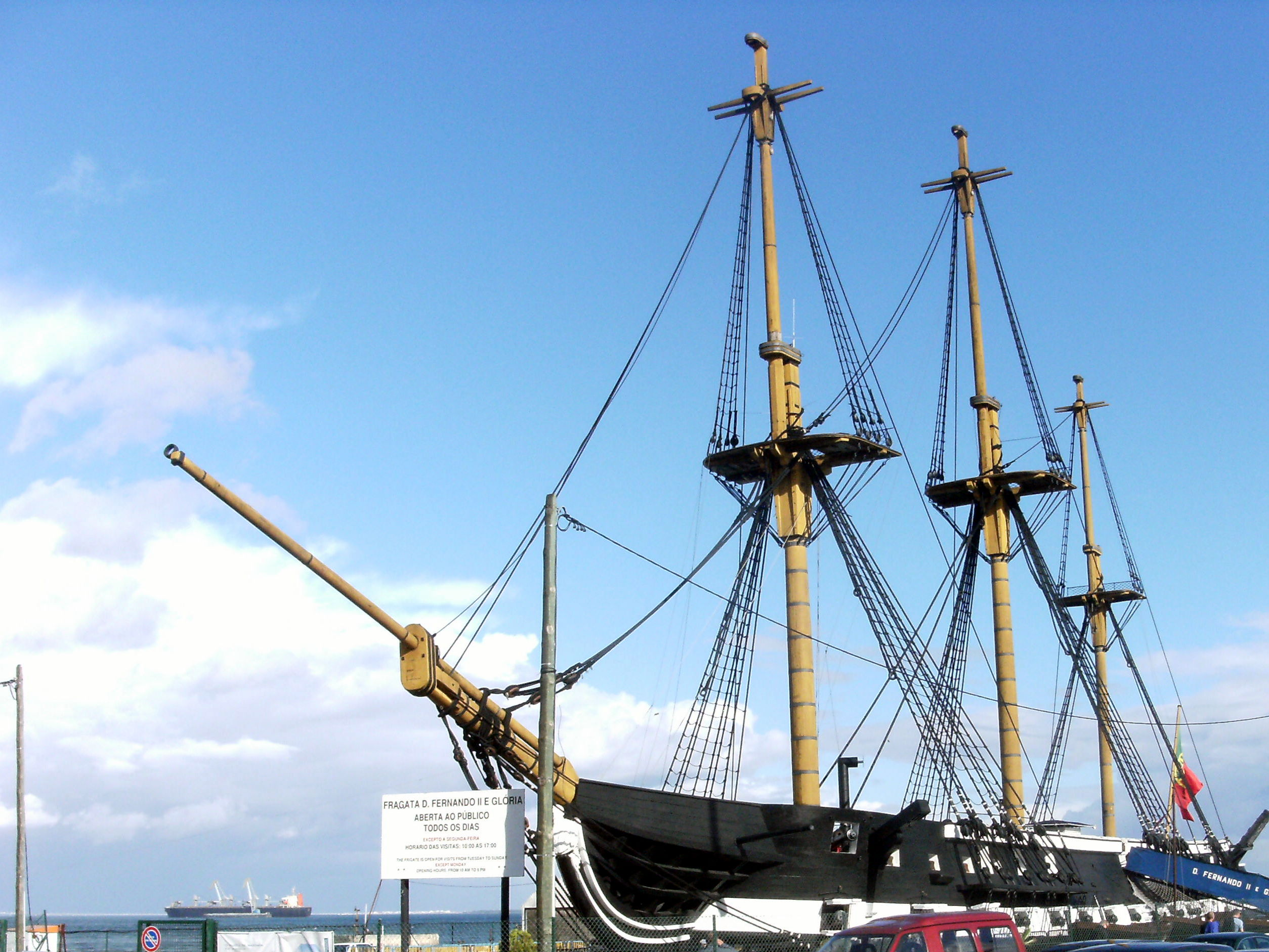
The frigate following reconstruction

In October 1990 the Portuguese Navy and the National Commission for the Commemoration of the Portuguese Discoveries initiated efforts in order of restoring the frigate as she was in the 1850s. This effort was led by Rear Admiral Francisco de Figueiredo e Silva Cunha Salvado. On 22 January 1992, the wooden hull was removed from the mud-flats and set floating again, placed in a floating dock and transported to the dry dock of the Arsenal of Alfeite first, and in 1993 to the Ria-Marine shipyards in Aveiro, where it remained for the next 5 years being restored, receiving widespread public and private support. On 27 April 1998, Dom Fernando II e Glória was reinstated in the Portuguese Navy as an Auxiliary Navy Unit (UAM 203).

On 12 August 1998, it was delivered to the Navy Museum after being considered by Decree an Historical Navy Ship on 18 July 1998. During its stay at Expo '98 that marked the 500th anniversary of the discovery of the sea route to India by Vasco da Gama, she was a major attraction being visited by almost 900,000 people.

In September 1998, the World Ship Trust awarded Dom Fernando II e Glória with the International Maritime Heritage Award, which considered her restoration as one of the most astonishing historic ship preservation achievements.

The International Register of Historic Ships considered Dom Fernando II e Glória as the fourth oldest armed frigate, and the eighth oldest sailing warship in the world.

== See also ==
- NRP Adamastor
- NRP Afonso de Albuquerque (1884)
- NRP Sagres (1937)
