= Cacilhas =

- Civil parish
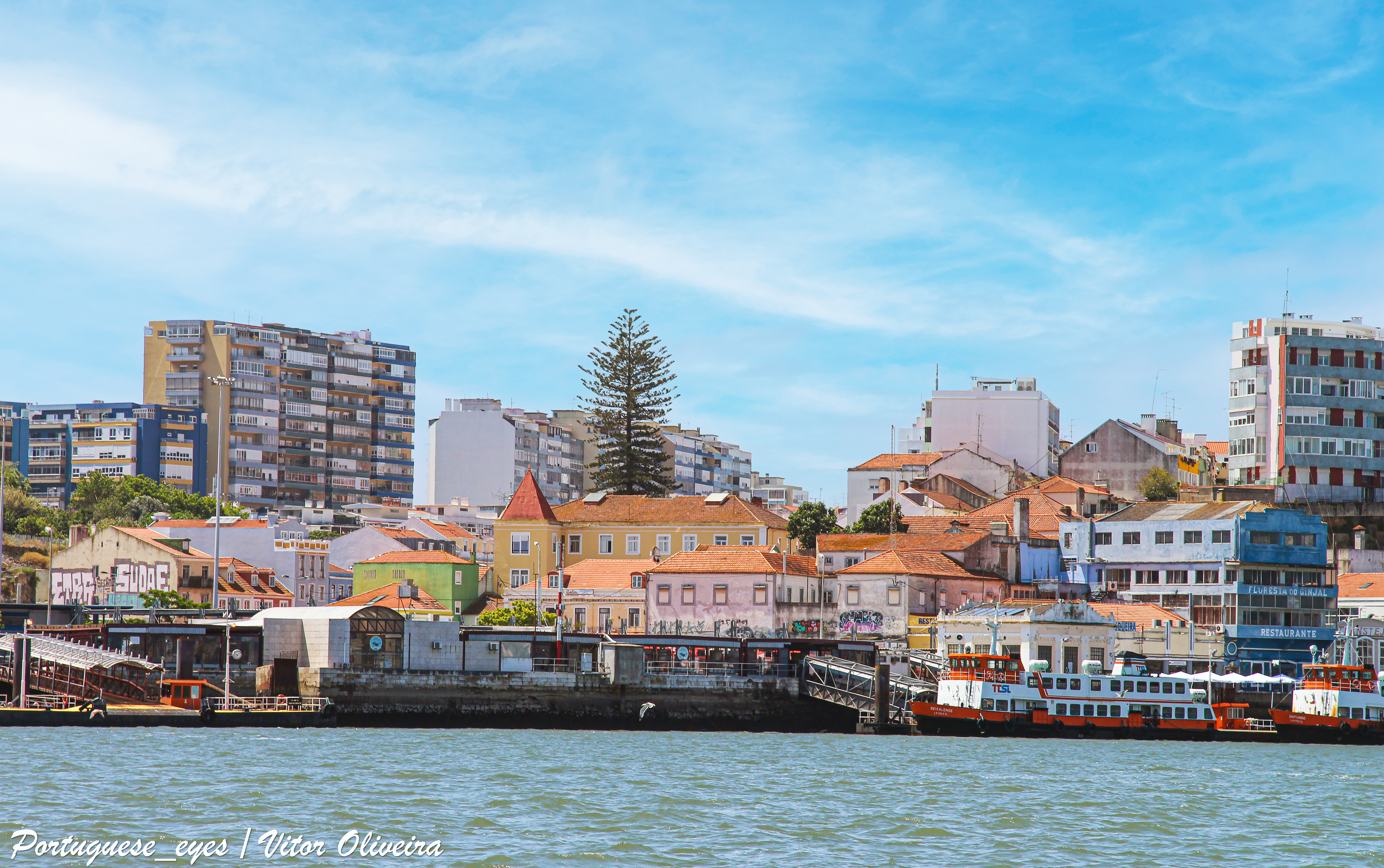

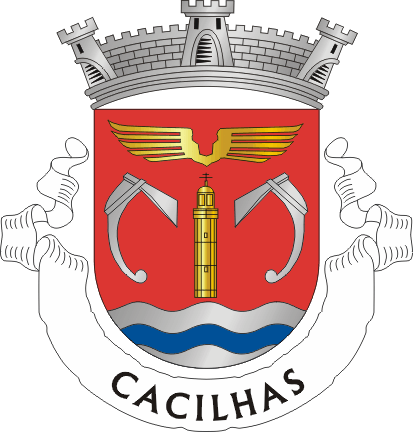
- Coat of arms

- Location in Portugal
- Coordinates: 38.686°N 9.149°W
- Country: Portugal
- Region: Lisbon
- Metropolitan area: Lisbon
- District: Setúbal
- Municipality: Almada
- Disbanded: 2013

Area
  - Total: 1.09 km^{2} (0.42 sq mi)

Population (2011)
  - Total: 6,017
  - Density: 5,520/km^{2} (14,300/sq mi)
- Time zone: UTC+00:00 (WET)
  - Summer (DST): UTC+01:00 (WEST)

Cacilhas (European Portuguese: [kɐˈsiʎɐʃ]) is a former civil parish in the municipality of Almada, Lisbon metropolitan area, Portugal. In 2013, the parish merged into the new parish Almada, Cova da Piedade, Pragal e Cacilhas. The population in 2011 was 6,017, in an area of 1.09 km^{2} (0.42 sq mi). Cacilhas is situated on the south bank of the river Tagus facing the city of Lisbon.

== History ==
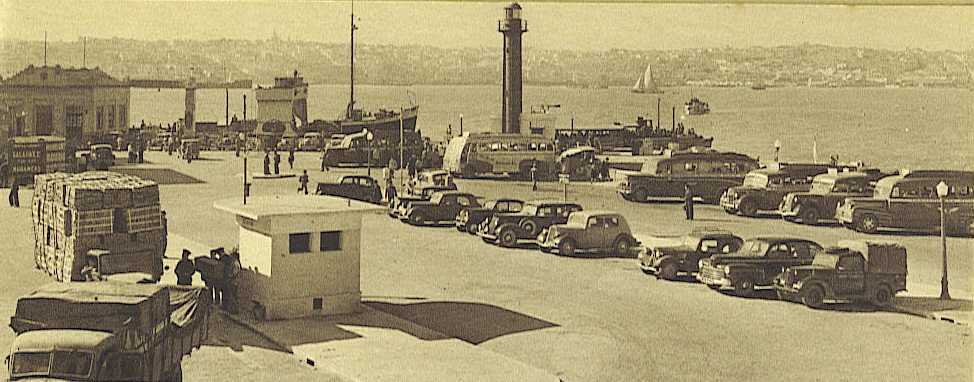
At the ferry wharf in 1950

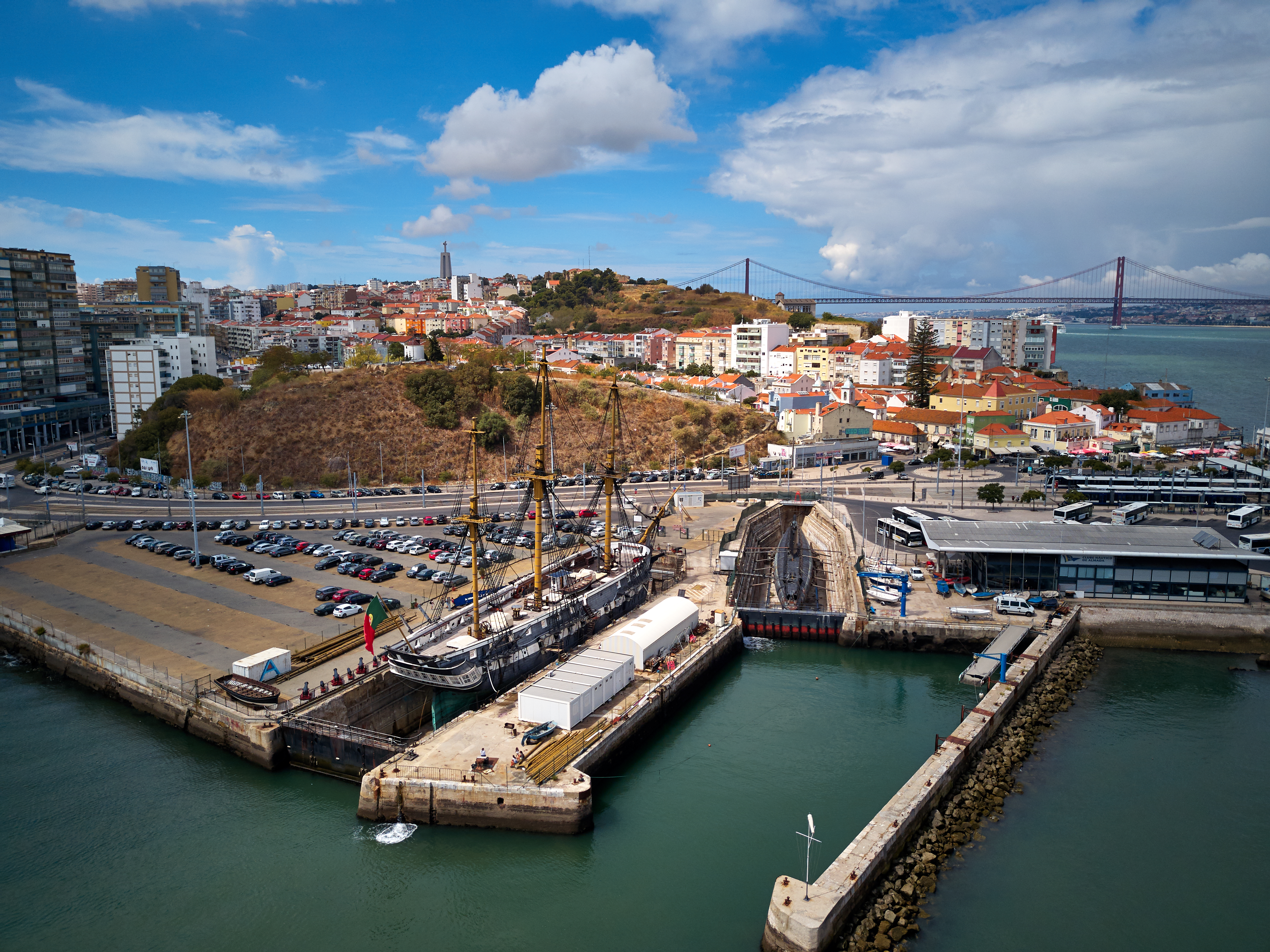
Cacilhas view nowadays.

== Transport ==
=== Ferry ===
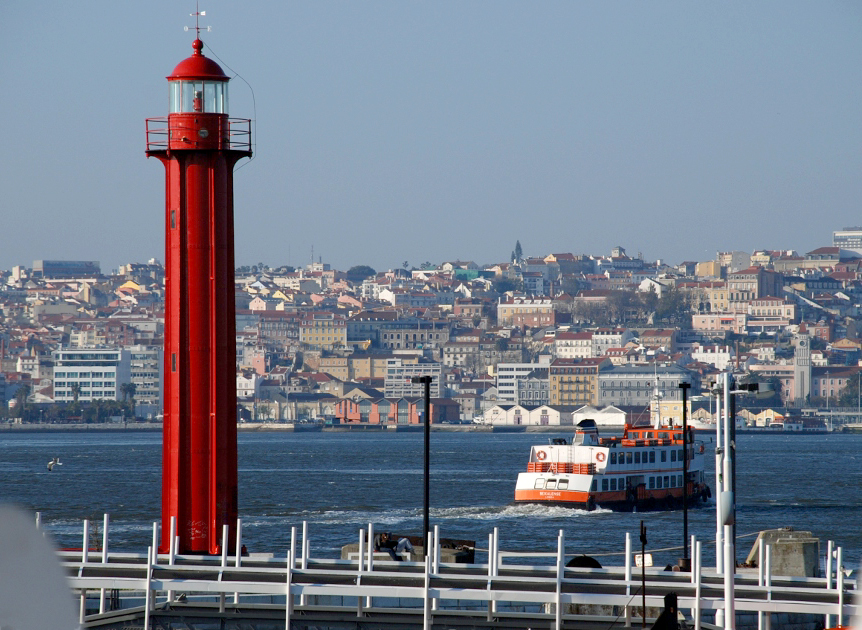
Cacilhas Lighthouse and ferry.

Cacilhas is connected by a regular ferry service to the Cais do Sodré railway station on the opposite bank of the river Tagus. Transtejo & Soflusa is the operator.

=== Lightrail ===
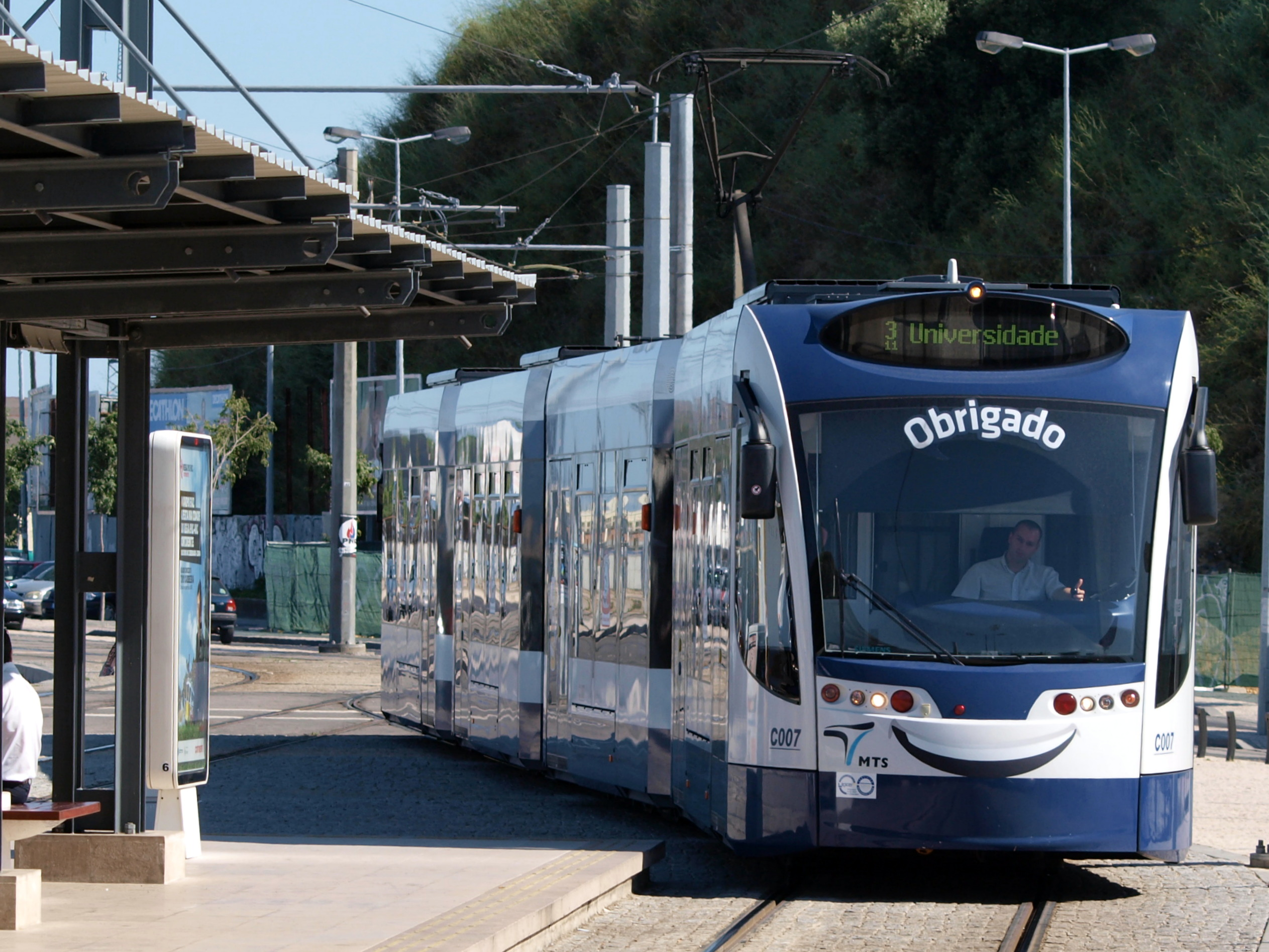
Metro rail terminus at Cacilhas

A terminus for the light rail of the Metro Transportes do Sul is located at Cacilhas. The light rail lines from Cacilhas connect with the Lisbon railway network.

=== Bus ===
Bus services depart Cacilhas for the Cristo Rei statue, the beach resort of Costa De Caparica and other destinations.

== Industry ==
=== Shipbuilding ===
In September 1961 Lisnave - Estaleiros Navais de Lisboa expanded on the South bank of the Tagus where a new yard - Margueira, was built with facilities to accommodate the largest vessels being built. In mid 1997 a restructuring plan was implemented, resulting in the closure of operations at Cacilhas in 2000. All activities are now concentrated in Mitrena, Setubal.

== Maritime Heritage ==
Dom Fernando II e Glória a wooden-hulled, 50 gun frigate of the Portuguese Navy is on display in a dry dock beside the transport interchange. In 1990 the Portuguese Navy decided to restore the ship to her appearance in the 1850s. She has been on display at Cacilhas since 2008. A submarine is also on display in the adjoining dry dock.
