= Porto Brandão =

Coordinates: 38.676°N 9.207°W

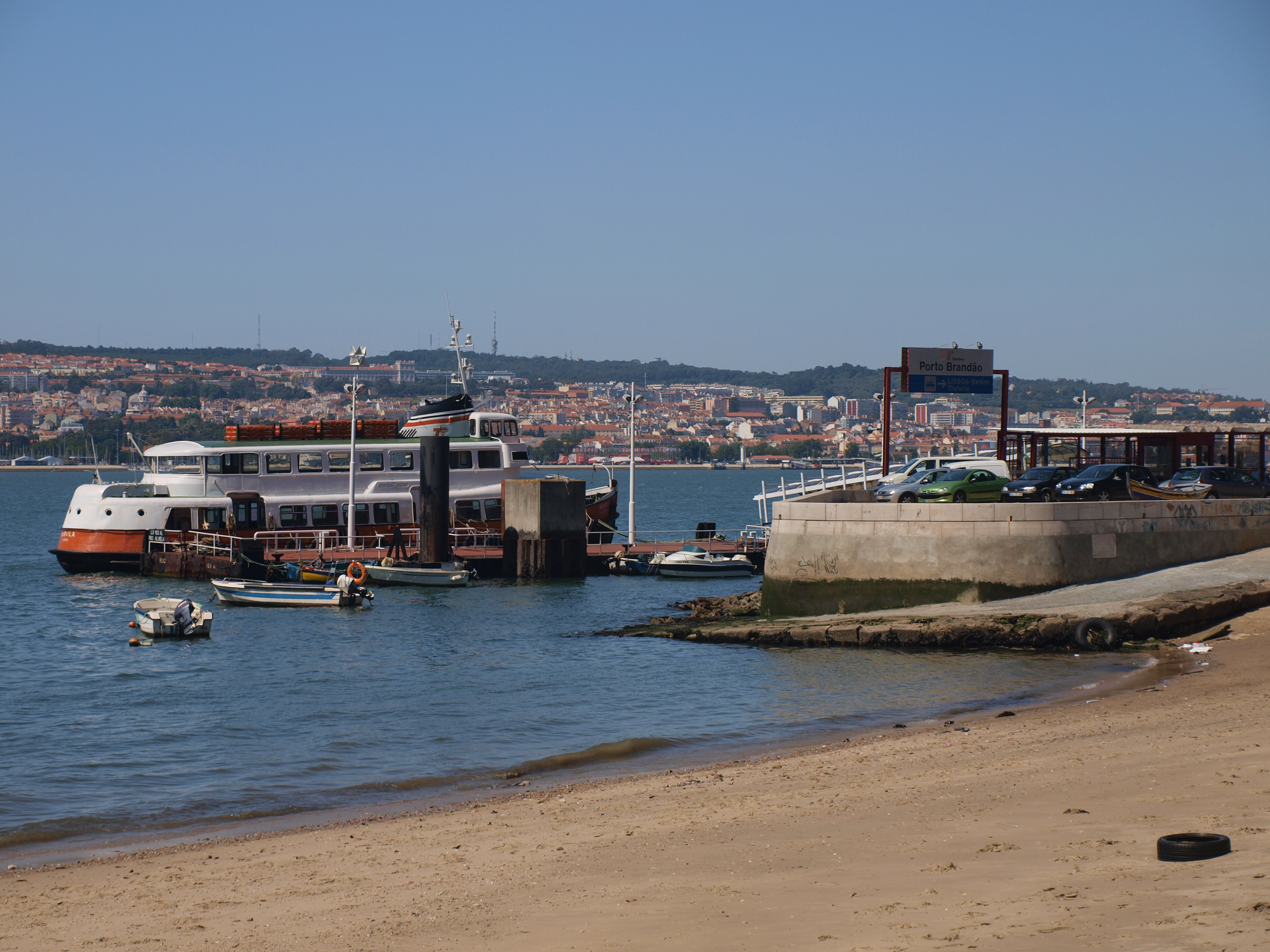
Harbor of Porto Brandão

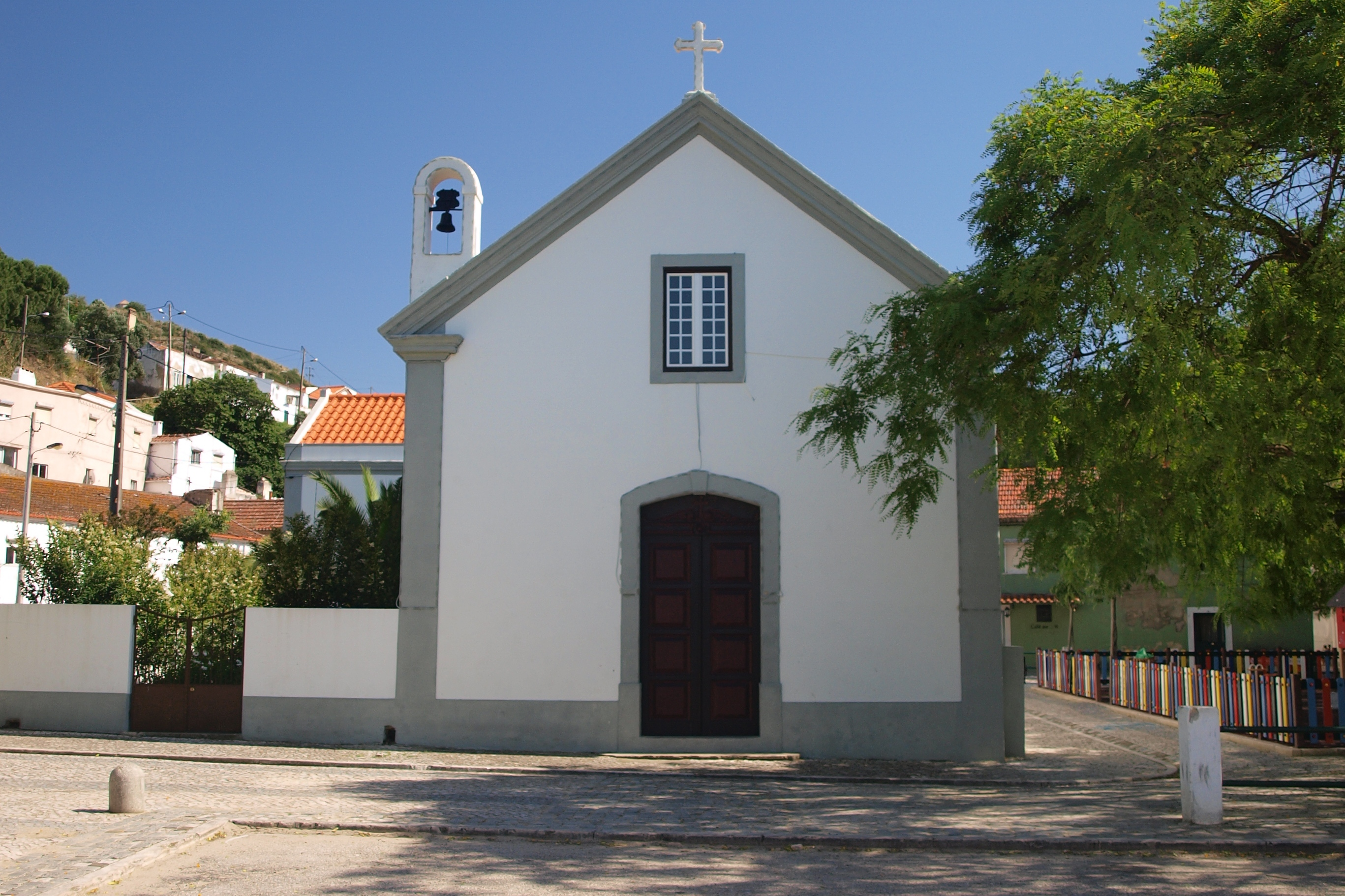
Church of Porto Brandão

Porto Brandão is a locality in the freguesia of Caparica e Trafaria, Almada Municipality, Portugal. It is situated in a strategic location by the Tejo river.

== Monuments ==
- Edifício do Lazareto, now in ruins. Until the 1990s, the buildings housed diverse families from the former Portuguese colonies in Africa especially Cape Verde.
