= Linha de Cascais =

Portuguese railway line

Cascais Line
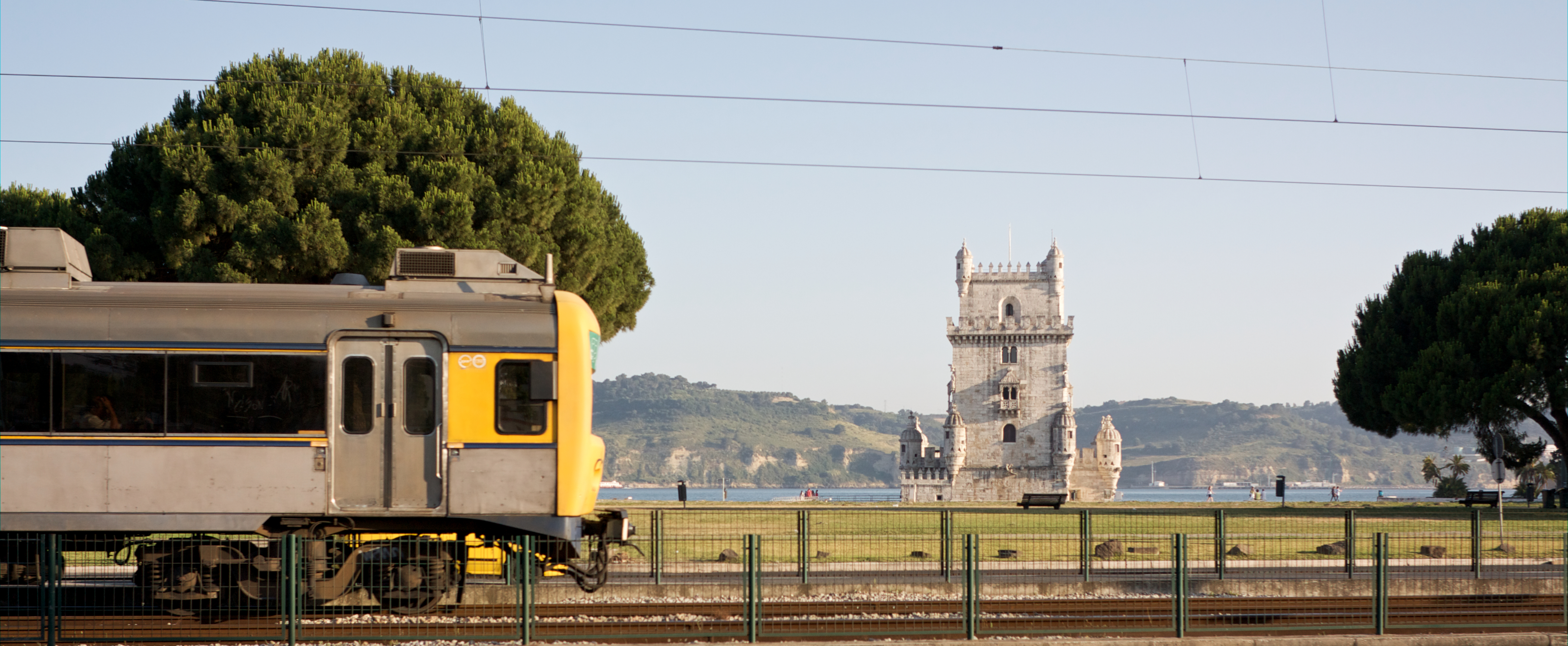
- CP Class 3150 close to Belém Tower.

Overview
- Status: Operational
- Owner: Infraestruturas de Portugal
- Termini: Cais do Sodré; Cascais
- Connecting lines: Cintura Line

Service
- Operator(s): Comboios de Portugal

Technical
- Line length: 25.4 km (15.8 mi)
- Track gauge: 1,668 mm (5 ft 5 21/32 in) Iberian gauge
- Electrification: 1500 V DC Overhead line Conversion planned to 25kv AC
- Signalling: ETCS Level 2 Planned (active by 2023)
Route map
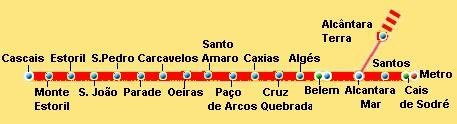

Location on the network
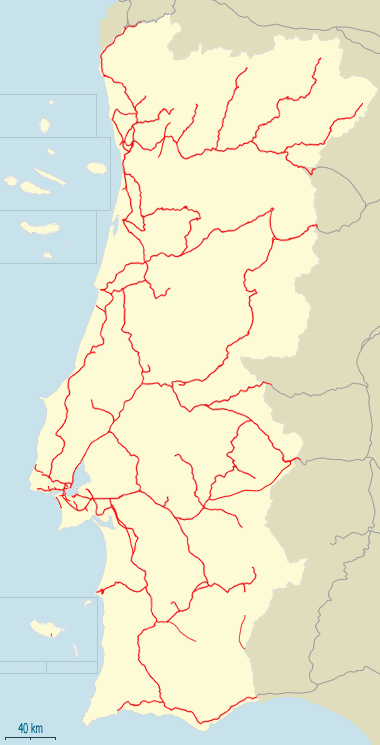

+ C. Sodré × Cascais (🔎)

The Cascais Line (Portuguese: Linha de Cascais) is a Portuguese railway line which connects the municipalities of Lisbon, Oeiras, and Cascais. The line starts in Lisbon, at Cais do Sodré and ends in Cascais. The first section, from Cascais to Pedrouços, was opened in 1889, and the line was completed in 1895.

In 1926, it became the first heavy rail line in Portugal to be electrified and, in 1977, was the last line to be integrated into the state-owned railway company, CP.

In July 2020, CP announced that the line was to be converted from 1500 V DC electrification, to 25 kV AC, to match the rest of the network. Signalling was also to be upgraded and new trains acquired.

== See also ==
- List of railway lines in Portugal
- List of Portuguese locomotives and railcars
- History of rail transport in Portugal
