= Entrecampos railway station =

Railway station in Lisbon, Portugal

Entrecampos
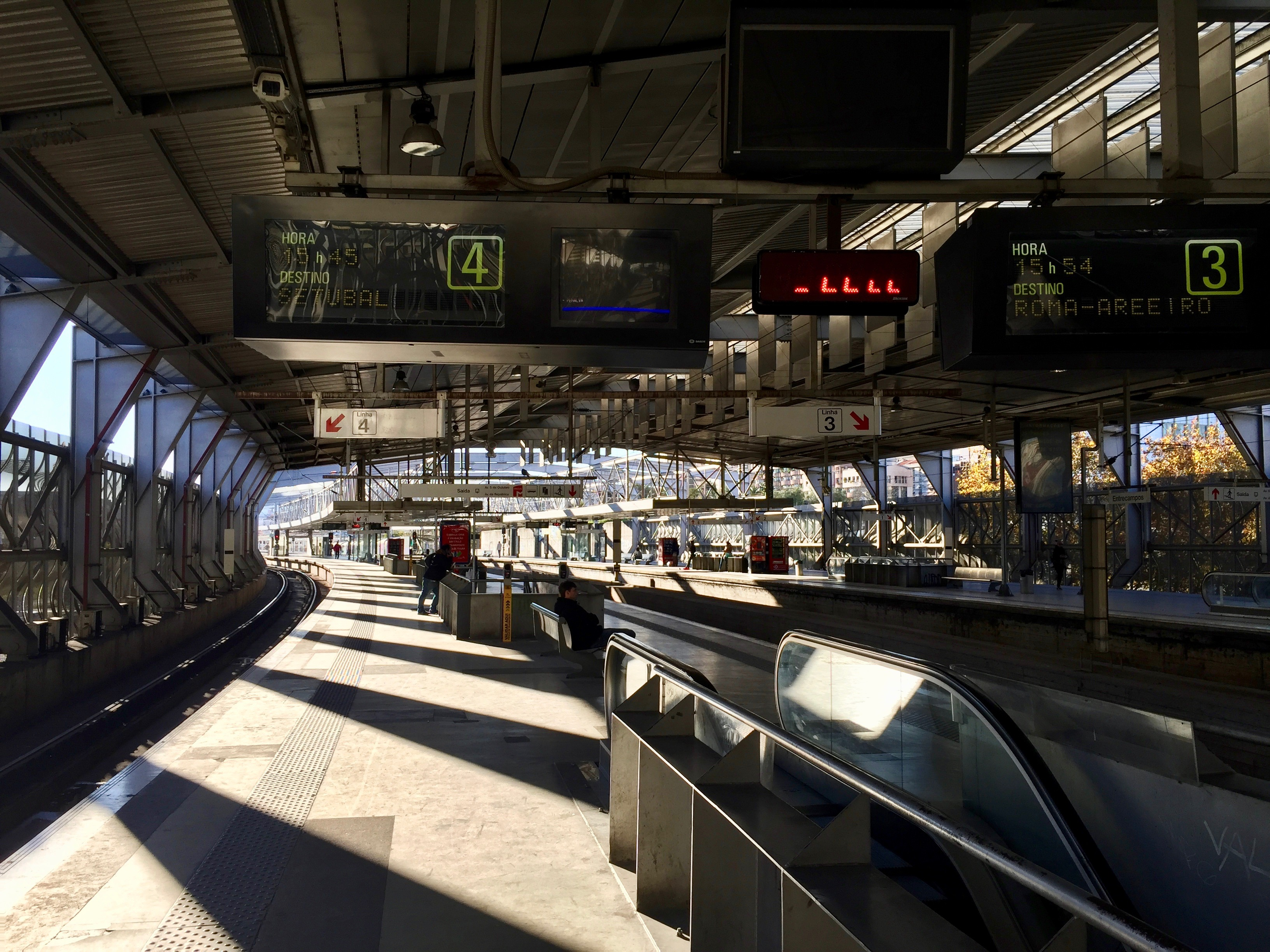
- The area between the platforms and station building, December 2017

General information
- Location: 1050-065 Lisbon; Portugal
- Coordinates: 38°44′41″N 9°8′55″W
- Elevation: 90 metres (300 ft)
- Operator: CP; Fertagus
- Manager: Infraestruturas de Portugal
- Line: Cintura Line
- Distance: 5.4 kilometres (3.4 mi) from Alcântara-Terra
- Platforms: 2 island platforms
- Tracks: 4
- Connections: Entre Campos

Construction
- Structure type: Elevated
- Accessible: Yes

History
- Opened: 20 May 1888

Services
Preceding station	Comboios de Portugal	Following station
Pinhal Novo towards Faro	Alfa Pendular	Lisbon-Oriente towards Porto-Campanhã
Sete Rios towards Faro	Intercidades	Lisbon-Oriente Terminus
Sete Rios towards Évora	Intercidades	Lisbon-Oriente Terminus
Sete Rios towards Caldas da Rainha	InterRegional	Lisbon-Santa Apolónia Terminus
Sete Rios towards Caldas da Rainha	Regional	Lisbon-Santa Apolónia Terminus
Other services
Preceding station	Lisbon CP	Following station
Sete Rios towards Sintra	Sintra Line	Roma-Areeiro towards Oriente
Sete Rios towards Sintra	Sintra Line	Roma-Areeiro towards Alverca
Sete Rios towards Alcântara-Terra	Azambuja Line	Roma-Areeiro towards Castanheira do Ribatejo
Sete Rios towards Alcântara-Terra	Azambuja Line Limited service	Roma-Areeiro towards Azambuja
Preceding station	Fertagus	Following station
Sete Rios towards Coina or Setúbal	Linha do Sul (Fertagus)	Roma-Areeiro Terminus
Location

Entrecampos Station (Portuguese: Estação Ferroviária de Entrecampos) is a railway station located in the city of Lisbon, on the Cintura Line. It is served by Comboios de Portugal's Sintra, Azambuja and Western Lines, along with long-distance services to the Southern Line, as well as the private operator Fertagus. It is managed by Infraestruturas de Portugal.

== Service ==
Alfa Pendular trains stop at Entrecampos Station twice daily in both directions—one in the morning and one in the evening. All services run between Campanhã in Porto and Faro.

Intercidades trains between Gare do Oriente and Faro stop at Entrecampos Station thrice daily in both directions.

Urban Lisbon CP trains stop at Entrecampos Station at approximately 30-minute intervals on weekends and off-peak periods on weekdays. During peak periods, trains stop at Entrecampos Station at approximately 10-minute intervals.

Fertagus trains stop at Entrecampos Station at 20-minute intervals on the weekday off-peak and 10-minute intervals on the weekday peak. On weekends, trains stop at 30-minute intervals.

== Station layout ==
The station is elevated. Bike racks are available outside of the station. Bus services stop at the east end of the station, on street level.

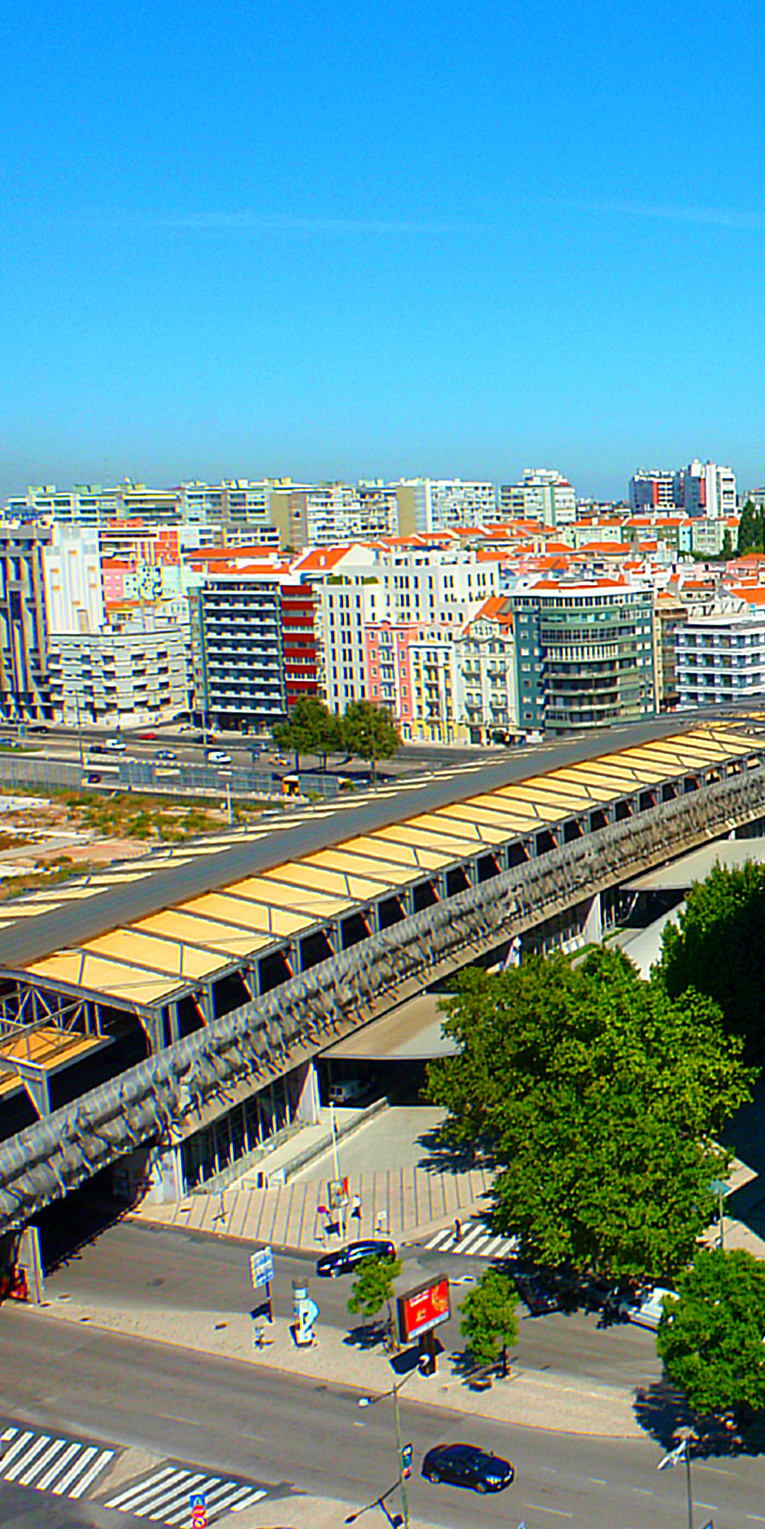
Aerial view of Entrecampos Station from the southwest, March 2013

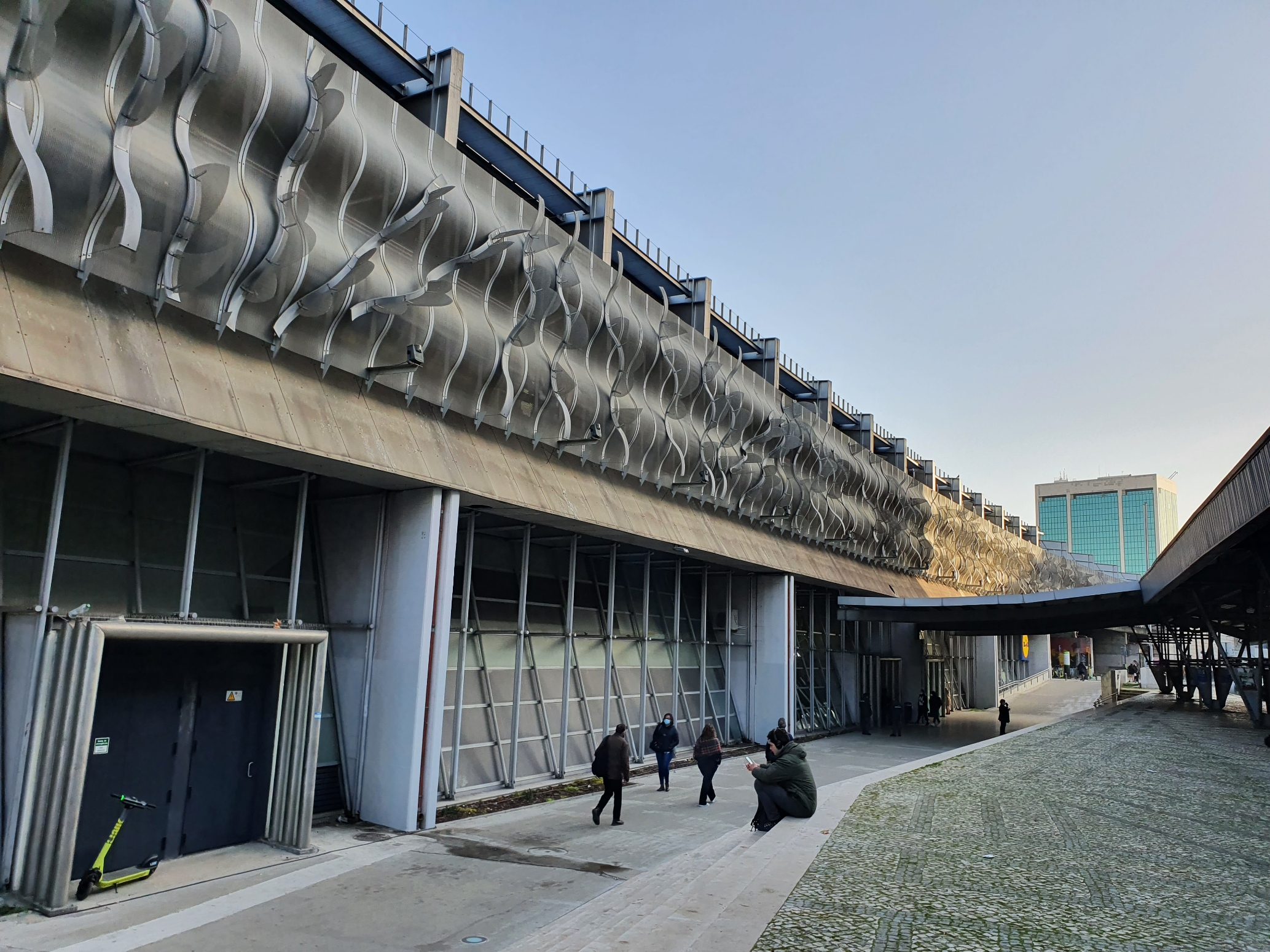
Wavy motifs on the south side of the station, February 2022

=== Platforms ===
Entrecampos Station consists of two island platforms serving four tracks. The platform for tracks 1 and 2 extends towards two sidings at Entrecampos-Poente railway station, a station which has been used in the past as a terminus for Sintra and Western line services.

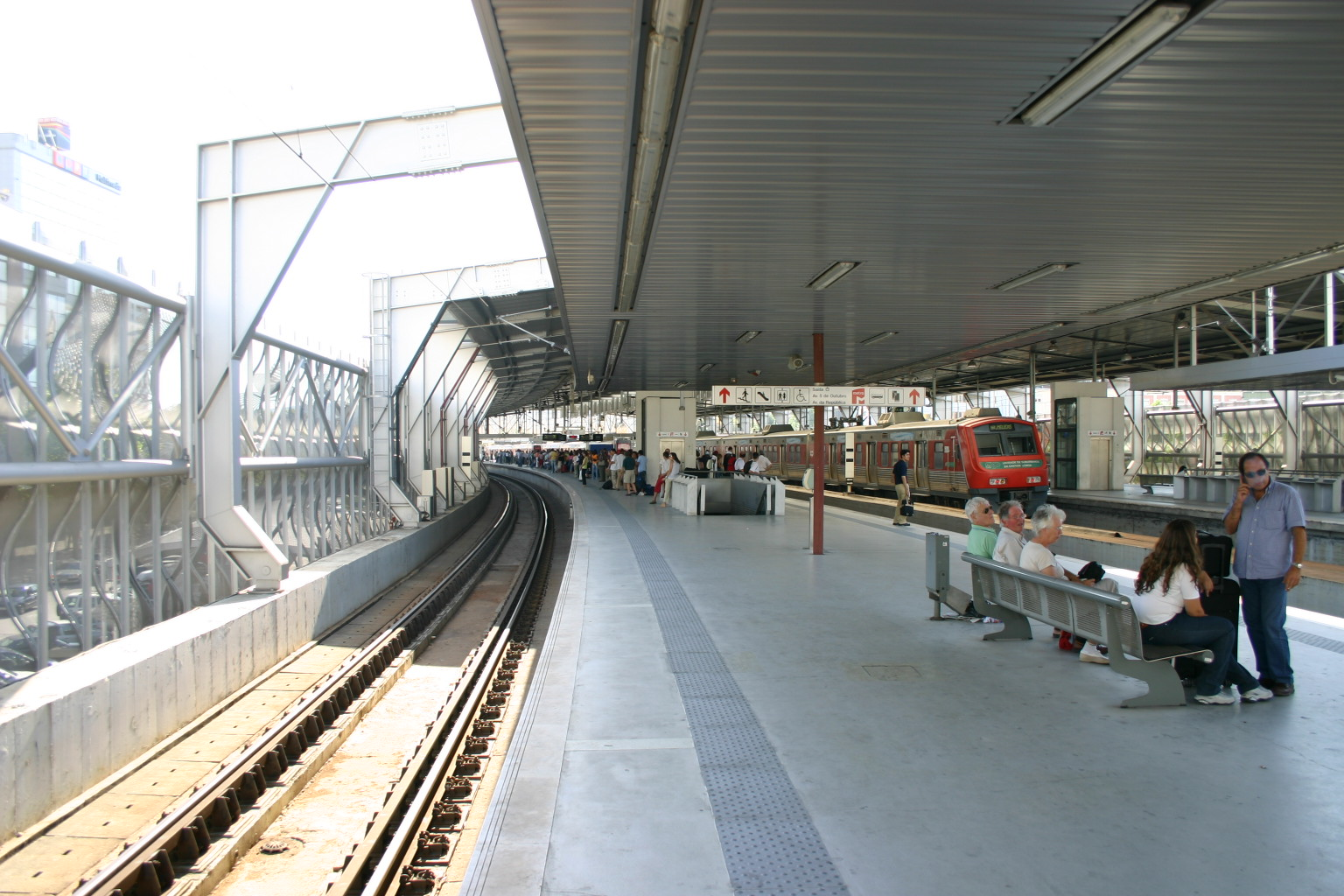
The platforms of Entrecampos Station, August 2006

== History ==
Entrecampos Station opened on 20 May 1888 on the Cintura Line between Benfica and Santa Apolónia. Fertagus trains began servicing Entrecampos Station in July 1999.

On 29 November 2023, the inauguration of a permanent piano at the train station took place. The initiative was started by Critical Software as a way of giving back to the community.

== Surrounding area ==
- Entrecampos
- Campo Pequeno Bullring
