= Sete Rios railway station =

Railway station in Lisbon, Portugal

Sete Rios
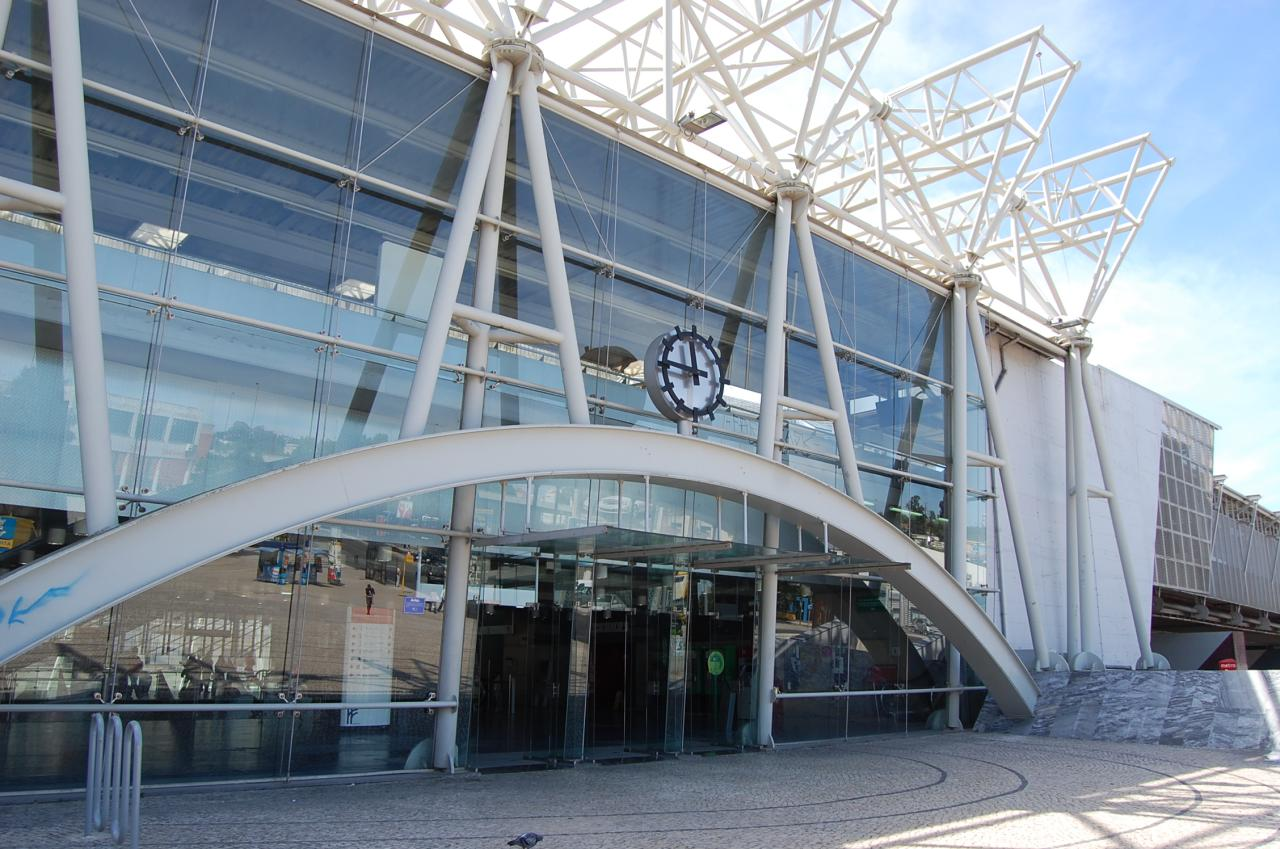
- The exterior of Sete Rios Station, August 2009

General information
- Location: 1500-161 Lisbon; Portugal
- Coordinates: 38°44′25″N 9°10′1″W
- Operator: Lisbon CP; Fertagus
- Manager: Infraestruturas de Portugal
- Lines: Cintura Line; Sete Rios direct curve
- Distance: 4.1 kilometres (2.5 mi) from Alcântara-Terra
- Platforms: 2 side platforms + 1 island platform
- Tracks: 4
- Connections: Jardim Zoológico

Construction
- Accessible: Yes

History
- Opened: 20 May 1888

Services
Preceding station	Comboios de Portugal	Following station
Pragal towards Faro	Intercidades	Entrecampos towards Lisbon-Oriente
Pragal towards Évora	Intercidades	Entrecampos towards Lisbon-Oriente
Agualva-Cacém towards Caldas da Rainha	InterRegional	Entrecampos towards Lisbon-Santa Apolónia
Agualva-Cacém towards Caldas da Rainha	Regional	Entrecampos towards Lisbon-Santa Apolónia
Other services
Preceding station	Lisbon CP	Following station
Benfica towards Sintra	Sintra Line	Entrecampos towards Oriente
Benfica towards Sintra	Sintra Line	Entrecampos towards Alverca
Campolide-A towards Alcântara-Terra	Azambuja Line	Entrecampos towards Castanheira do Ribatejo
Campolide-A towards Alcântara-Terra	Azambuja Line Limited service	Entrecampos towards Azambuja
Preceding station	Fertagus	Following station
Campolide-A towards Coina or Setúbal	Linha do Sul (Fertagus)	Entrecampos towards Roma-Areeiro
Location

Sete Rios Station (Portuguese: Estação Ferroviária de Sete Rios) is a railway station located in the city of Lisbon. It is served by the Sintra and Azambuja Lines, as well as the private operator Fertagus. It is managed by Infraestruturas de Portugal.

== Service ==
Intercidades trains between Gare do Oriente and Faro stop at Sete Rios Station thrice daily in both directions.

Urban service trains stop at Sete Rios Station at approximately 30-minute intervals on weekends and off-peak periods on weekdays. During peak periods, trains stop at Sete Rios Station at approximately 10-minute intervals.

== Station layout ==
Sete Rios Station consists of two side platforms and one island platform serving four tracks.

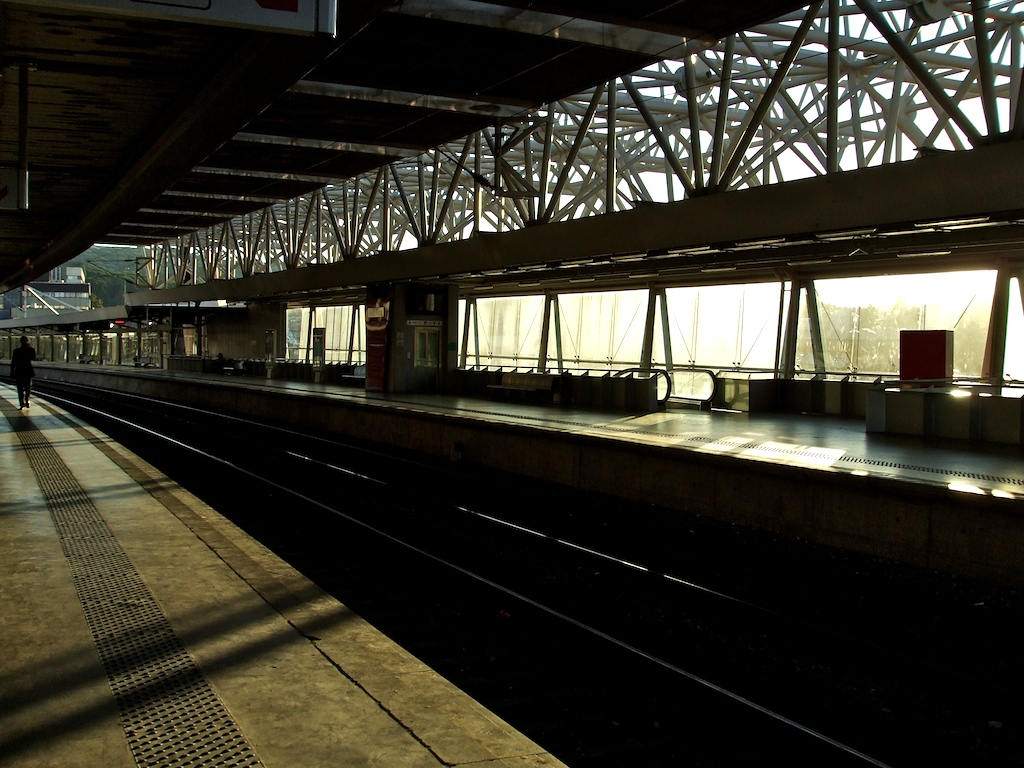
The platforms of Sete Rios Station, July 2008

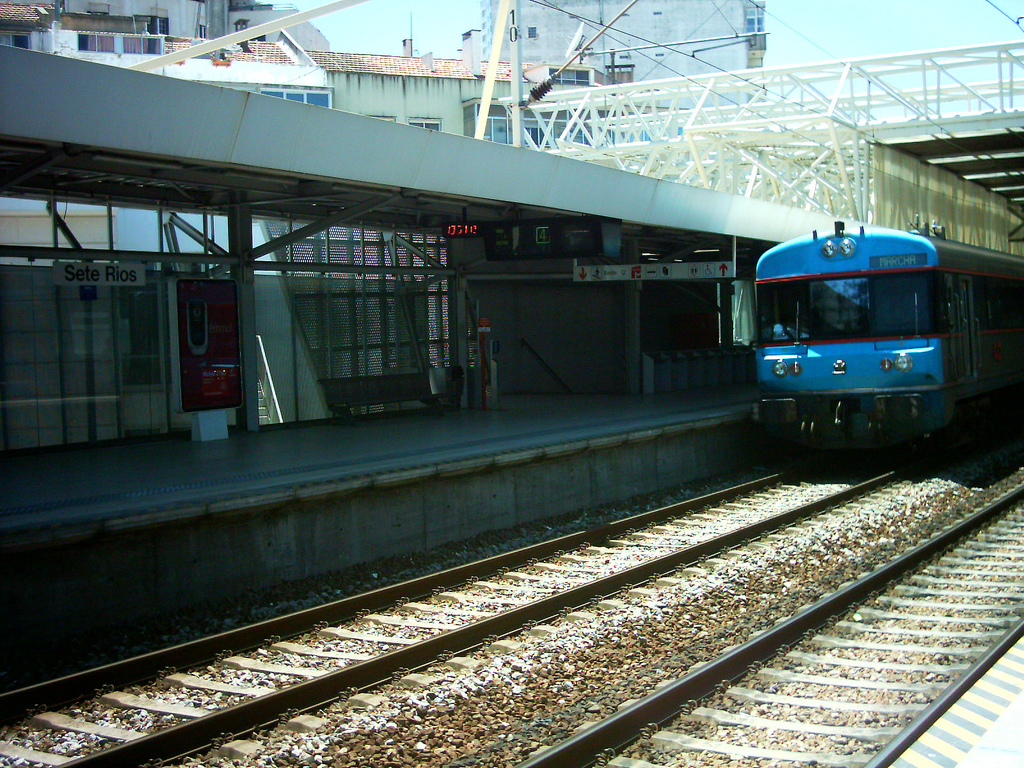
A regional train pulling into Track 4 of Sete Rios Station, June 2008

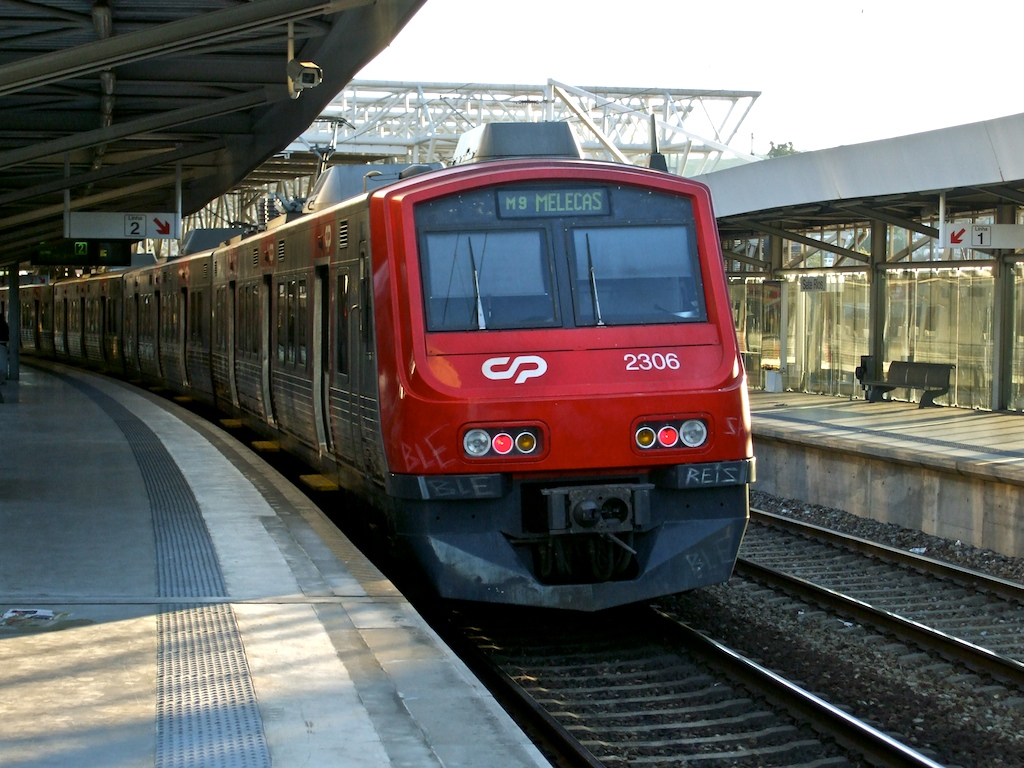
An urban service train leaving Track 2 of Sete Rios Station, July 2008

== History ==
Sete Rios Station opened on 20 May 1888 on the Cintura Line between Benfica and Santa Apolónia. Fertagus trains began servicing Sete Rios Station in July 1999.

== Surrounding area ==
- Lisbon Zoo
- U.S. Embassy and Consulate in Portugal
