= Benfica railway station =

Railway station in Lisbon, Portugal

Benfica
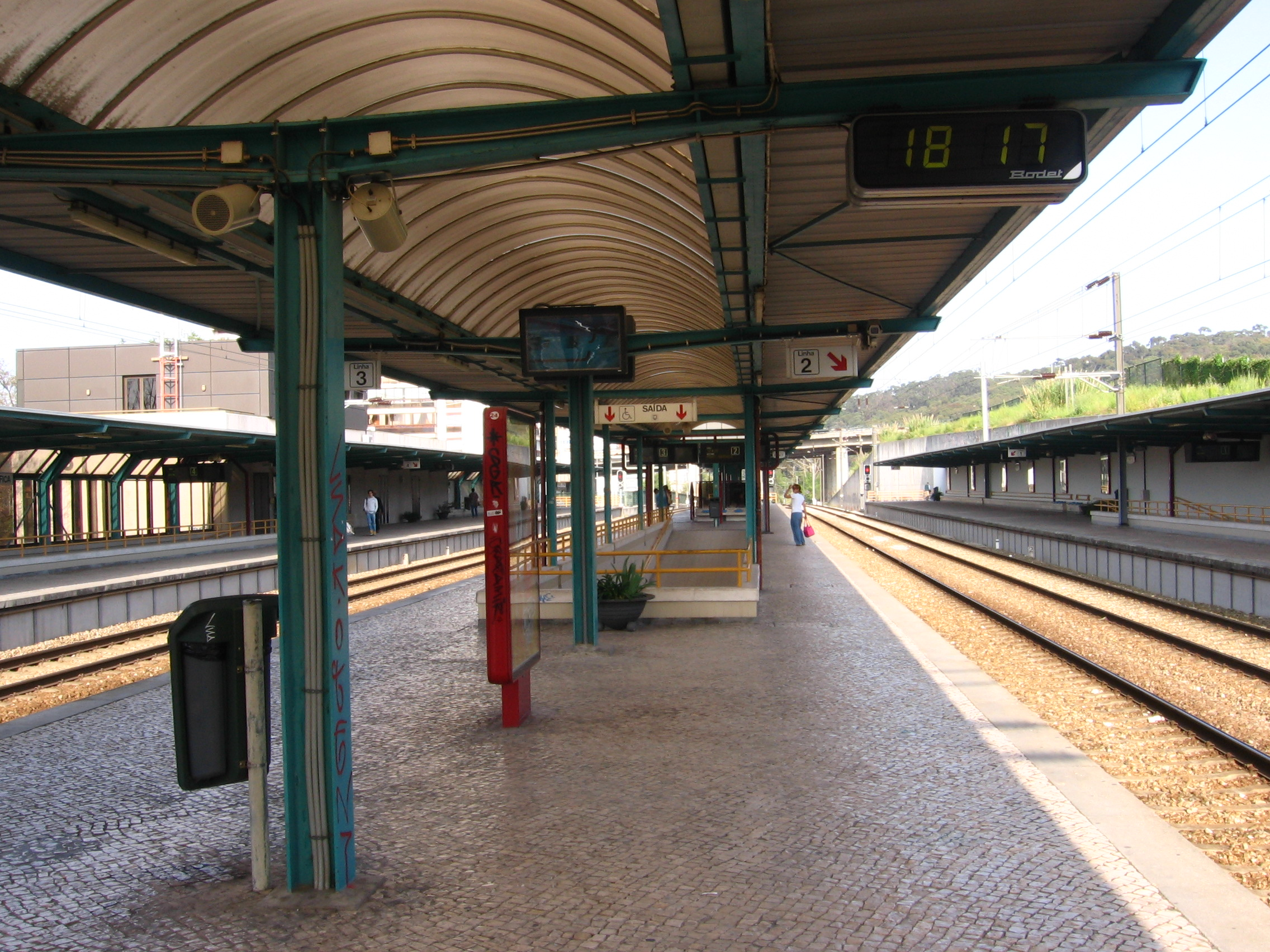
- The platforms of Benfica Station, May 2008

General information
- Location: Rua da Venezuela, 1500-144 Lisbon; Portugal
- Coordinates: 38°44′40″N 9°11′59″W
- Operator: Lisbon CP
- Manager: Infraestruturas de Portugal
- Line: Sintra Line
- Distance: 6.3 kilometres (3.9 mi) from Rossio
- Platforms: 2 side platforms + 1 island platform
- Tracks: 4

Construction
- Structure type: Ground-level
- Accessible: Yes

History
- Opened: 2 April 1887

Services
Preceding station	Lisbon CP	Following station
Santa Cruz-Damaia towards Sintra	Sintra Line	Campolide towards Rossio
Santa Cruz-Damaia towards Sintra	Sintra Line	Sete Rios towards Oriente
Santa Cruz-Damaia towards Sintra	Sintra Line	Sete Rios towards Alverca
Santa Cruz-Damaia towards Mira Sintra-Meleças	Sintra Line	Campolide towards Rossio
Location

Benfica Station (Portuguese: Estação Ferroviária de Benfica) is a railway station located in the city of Lisbon. It is served by the Sintra and Azambuja Lines. It is operated by Lisbon CP and managed by Infraestruturas de Portugal.

== Service ==
Trains stop at Benfica Station at approximately 15-minute intervals on weekends and off-peak periods on weekdays. During peak periods, trains stop at Benfica Station at approximately 5-minute intervals, with some trains arriving within a minute of each other.

== Station layout ==
Benfica Station is built on ground-level. The station has road access from both the north and the south. Bus and taxi service is provided at the north side of the station.

=== Platforms ===
Benfica Station consists of two side platforms and one island platform serving four tracks.

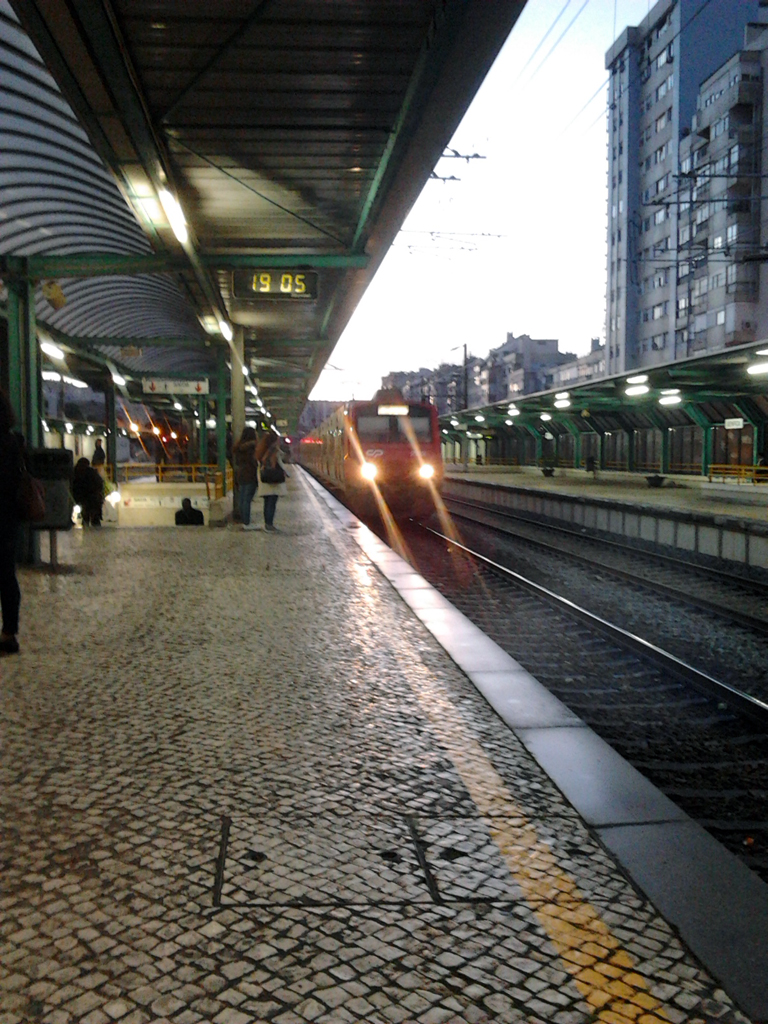
A CP Series 2300 train approaching Benfica Station, March 2016

== History ==
Benfica Station opened on 2 April 1887, originally spelled as Bemfica. It was built on the Sintra Line on an alignment between Alcântara-Terra and Sintra. The southern terminus of the line was shifted to Rossio following that station's completion on 11 June 1890. The station's name was standardized as Benfica in 1911, following a spelling reform. The quadrupling of the Sintra Line tracks between Benfica and Amadora was completed in September 1999.

== Surrounding area ==
- Pina Manique Stadium (the home stadium of Casa Pia A.C.)
- Silva Porto Park
