= Campolide railway station =

Railway station in Lisbon, Portugal

Campolide
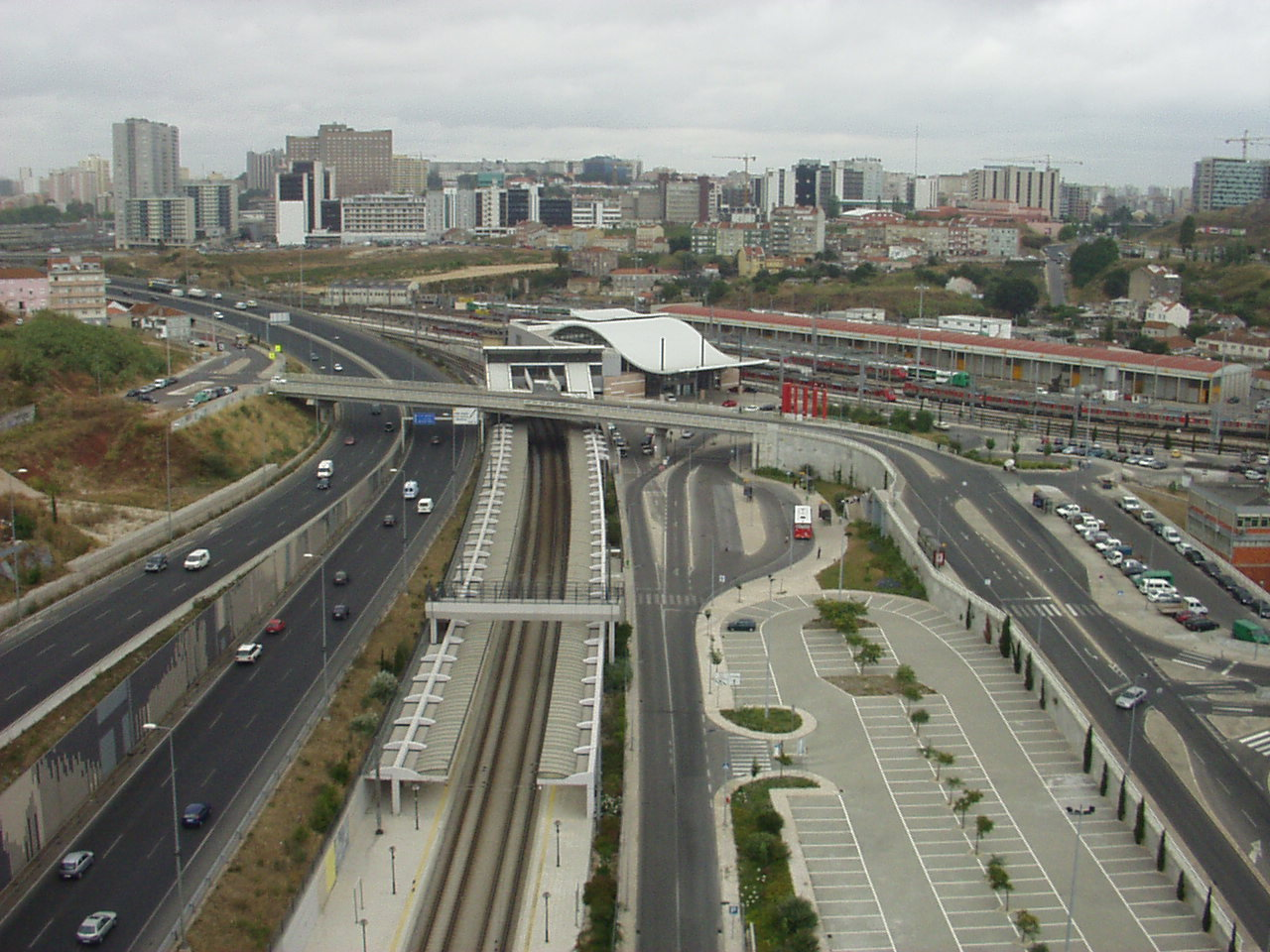
- Broad view of Campolide Station from the south, July 2002

General information
- Location: Largo da Estação, 1070-025 Lisbon; Portugal
- Coordinates: 38°43′58″N 9°10′5″W
- Elevation: 50 metres (160 ft)
- Operator: Lisbon CP; Fertagus
- Manager: Infraestruturas de Portugal
- Lines: Sintra Line; Cintura Line; Linha do Sul; Sete Rios direct curve
- Distance: 3.1 kilometres (1.9 mi) from Rossio; 2.7 kilometres (1.7 mi) from Alcântara-Terra
- Platforms: 2 side platforms + 1 island platform
- Tracks: 4

Construction
- Accessible: Yes

History
- Opened: 2 April 1887

Services
Preceding station	Lisbon CP	Following station
Benfica towards Sintra	Sintra Line	Rossio Terminus
Benfica towards Mira Sintra-Meleças	Sintra Line	Rossio Terminus
Alcântara-Terra Terminus	Azambuja Line	Sete Rios towards Castanheira do Ribatejo
Alcântara-Terra Terminus	Azambuja Line Limited service	Sete Rios towards Azambuja
Preceding station	Fertagus	Following station
Pragal towards Coina or Setúbal	Linha do Sul (Fertagus)	Sete Rios towards Roma-Areeiro
Location

Campolide Station (Portuguese: Estação Ferroviária de Campolide) is a railway station located in the city of Lisbon. It is served by the Sintra and Azambuja Lines, as well as the private operator Fertagus. It is operated by Lisbon CP and managed by Infraestruturas de Portugal.

== Service ==
Trains stop at Campolide Station at approximately 30-minute intervals on weekends. On weekdays, trains stop at Campolide Station at approximately 15-minute intervals, with some trains arriving within a minute of each other.

== Station layout ==
Campolide Station is divided into two sections. The "Campolide" section provides service for Sintra Line trains, and consists of one island platform serving two tracks. Two additional platforms are located in this section, but do not serve passengers. The "Campolide-A" section provides service for Cintura Line and Fertagus trains, and consists of two side platforms serving two tracks.

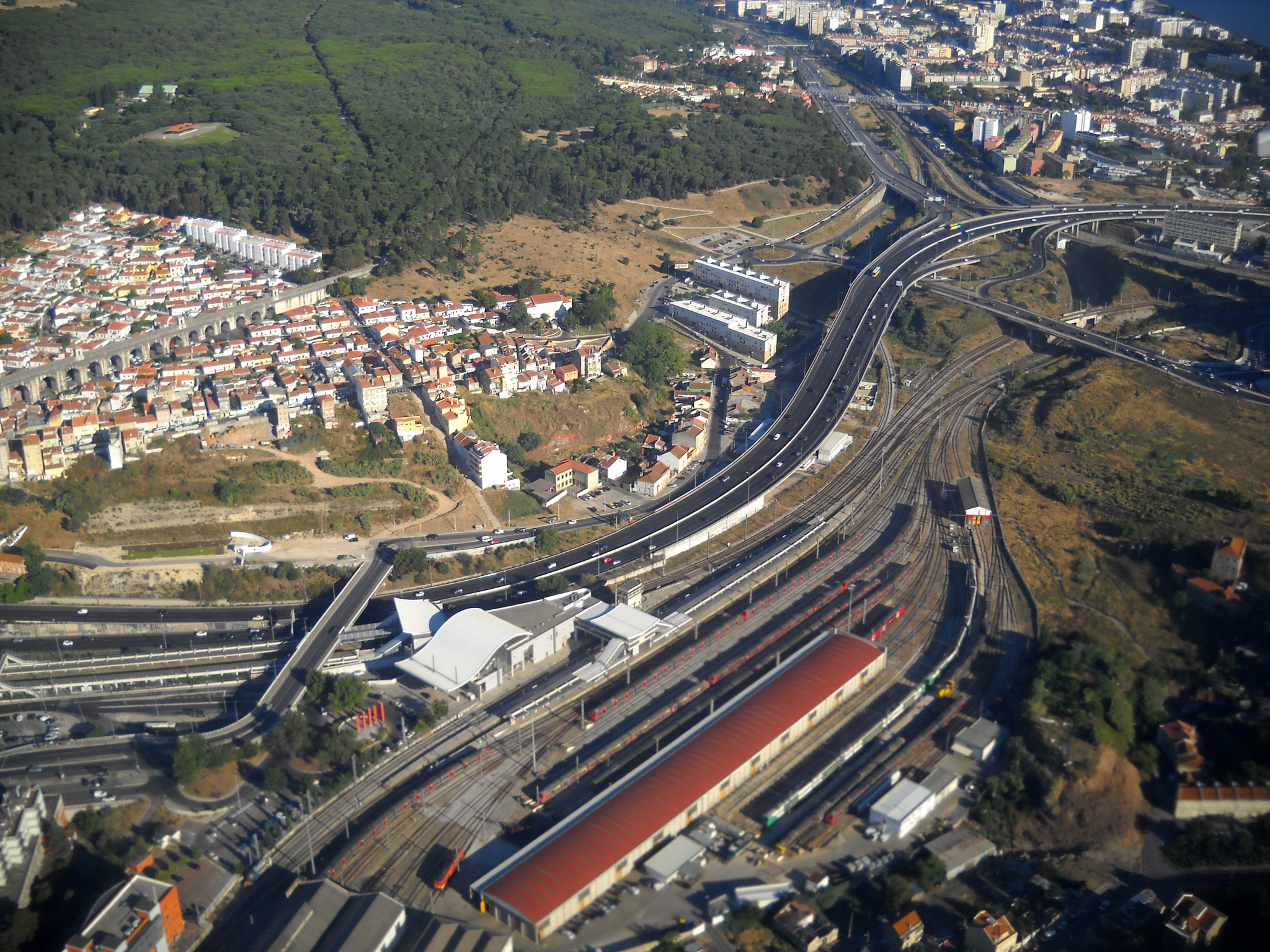
Aerial view of Campolide Station, July 2012

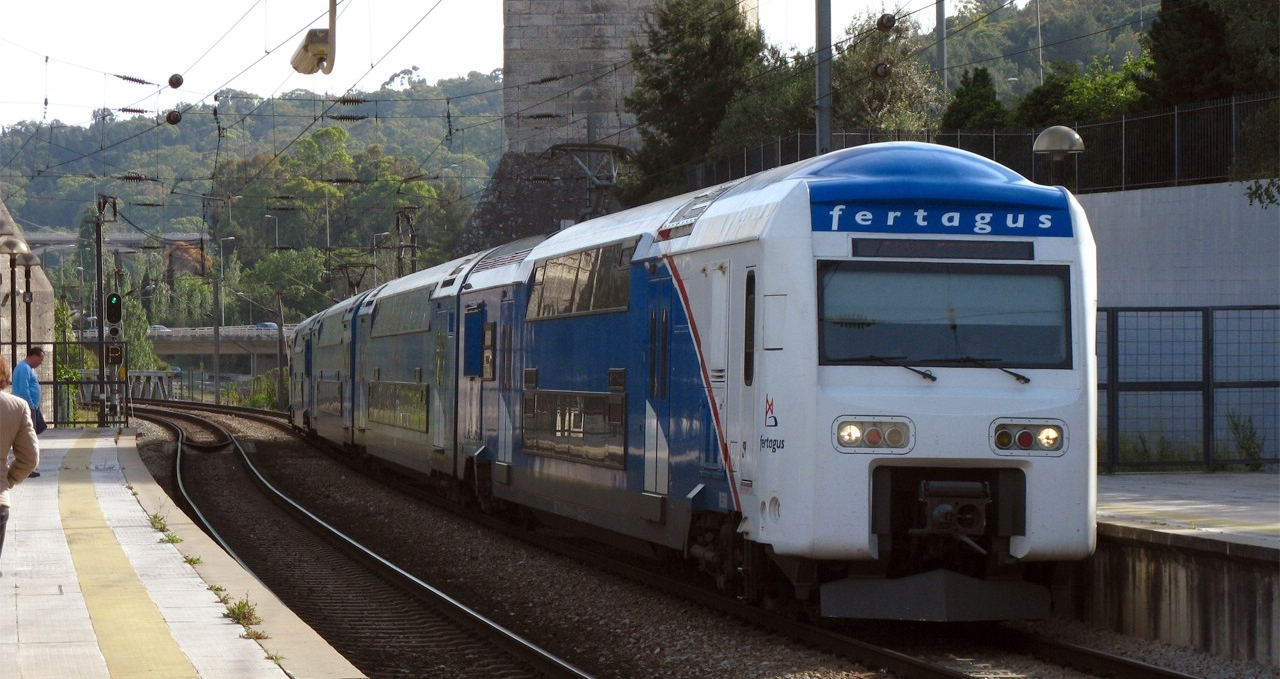
A Fertagus train arriving at Campolide-A, April 2009

== History ==
Campolide Station opened on 2 April 1887, originally on the Sintra Line between Alcântara-Terra and Sintra. The southern terminus of the line was shifted to Rossio following that station's completion on 11 June 1890. A signal tower was built at the station in 1940.

== Surrounding area ==
- Quinta do Zé Pinto
- Bairro da Liberdade
