= Praça de Entrecampos =

Coordinates: 38°44′54″N 9°8′54″W

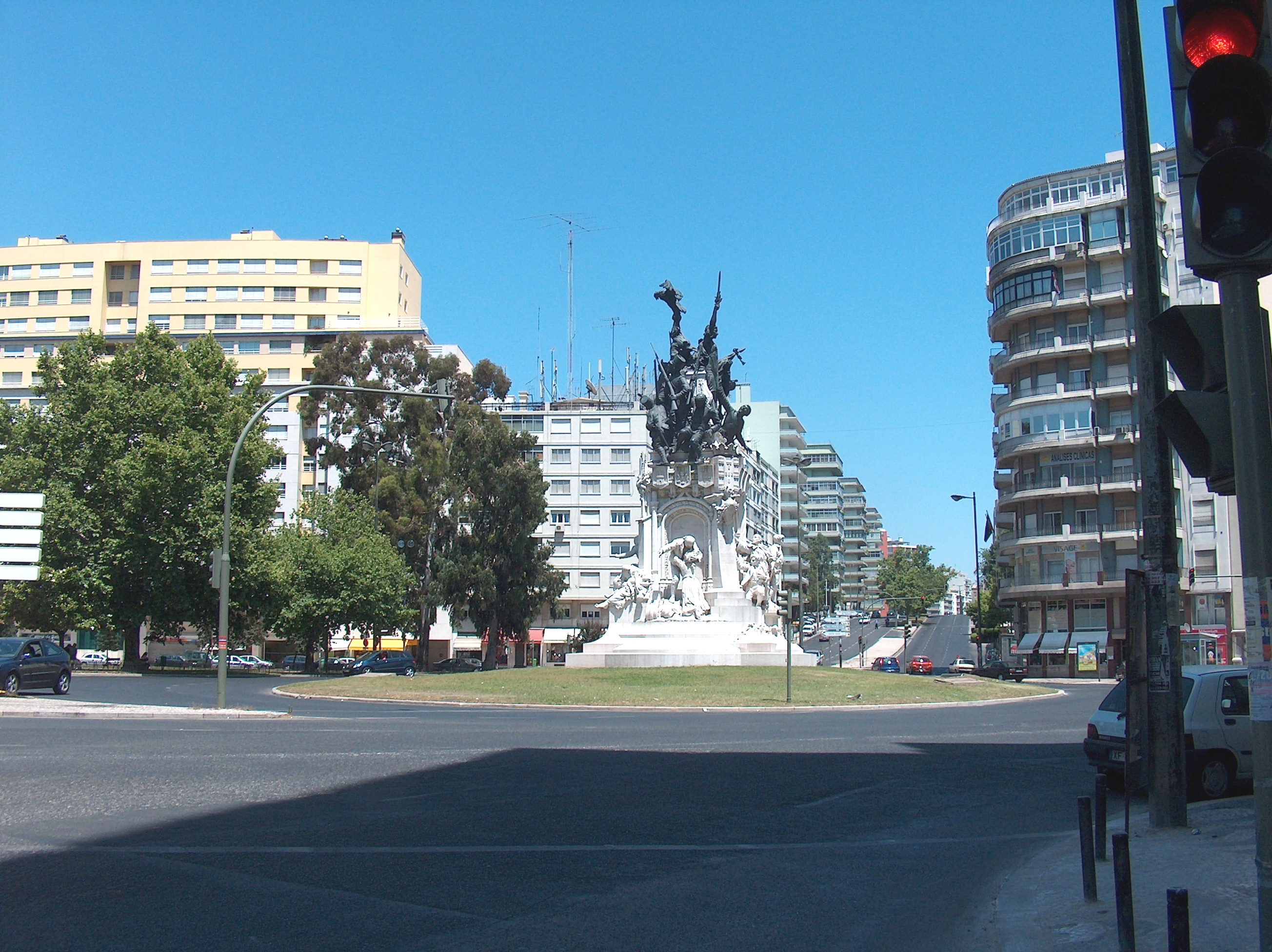
Praça de Entrecampos

Praça de Entrecampos is a plaza in Lisbon, Portugal. "Entrecampos" means "between the fields" in Portuguese. Entrecampos is located between Campo Grande ("large field") and Campo Pequeno ("small field").

At the center is Lisbon's Monument to the Heroes of the Peninsular War (Monumento aos Heróis da Guerra Peninsular).

The plaza is the starting point of three major avenues: Avenida da República to the South, Avenida dos Estados Unidos da América to the East and Avenida das Forças Armadas to the West.

The plaza has a Lisbon Metro station on the Yellow Line (Linha Amarela) and a CP railway station. The metro station is spelled as two words, Entre Campos. The railway station is written as a single word, Entrecampos. Lines serving the railway station include the Alfa Pendular and suburban lines.
