= Linha do Sul =

Portuguese railway line

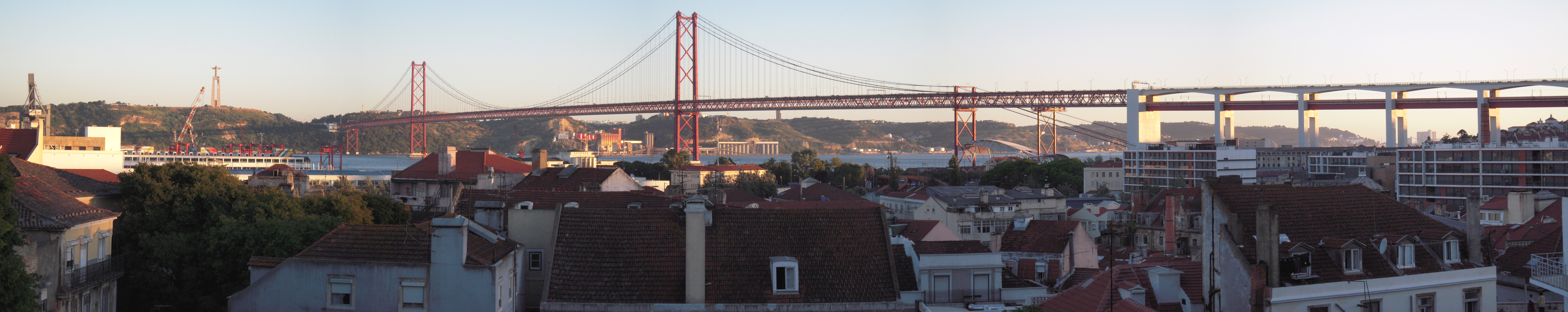
- Linha do Sul on the lower deck of the 25th of Abril Bridge.

Overview
- Status: Operational
- Owner: Infraestruturas de Portugal
- Termini: Campolide-A; Tunes

Service
- Operator(s): Comboios de Portugal

Technical
- Line length: 273.6 km (170.0 mi)
- Track gauge: Iberian
- Electrification: 25 kV / 50 kHz Overhead line
Route map
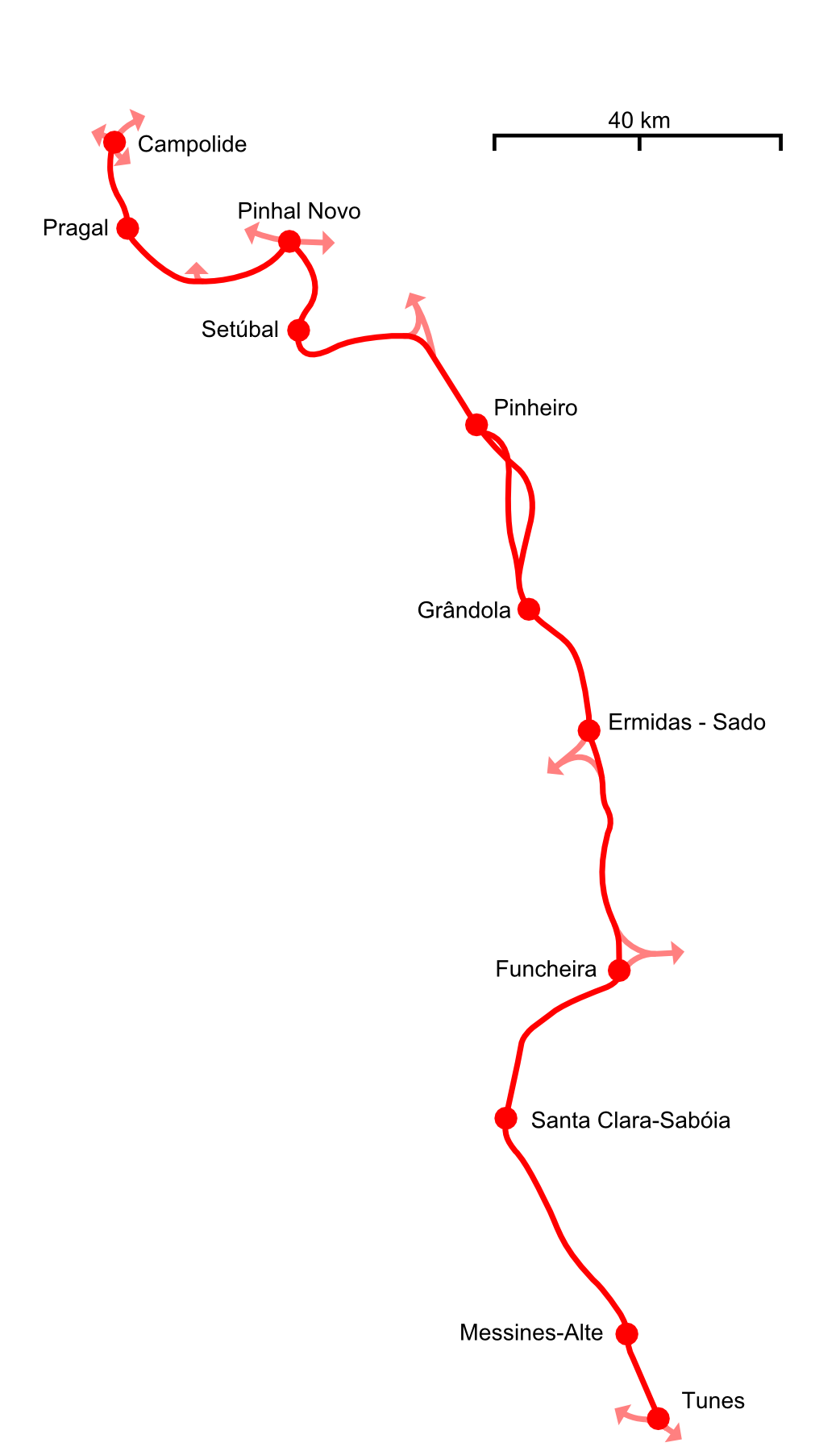

Location on the network
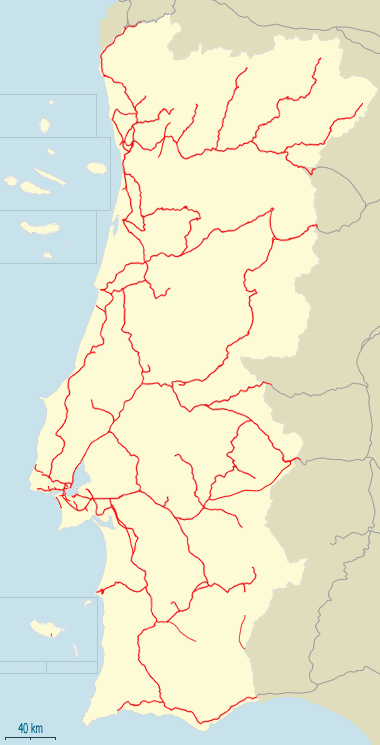

+ Campolide-A × Tunes (🔎)

Linha do Sul is a Portuguese railway line which connects Campolide A, in Lisbon, and Tunes, in the Algarve. The first section, from Pinhal Novo to Setúbal, was opened in 1861. The route to Funcheira opened on 25 May 1920. In 2003 it was linked to Lisbon, crossing the Tagus on the 25th of Abril Bridge.

The section between Pinhal Novo and Funcheira was classified as Linha do Sado until 1992, while the section from Barreiro to Vila Real de Santo António via Vendas Novas and Beja was classified as Linha do Sul.

== See also ==
- List of railway lines in Portugal
- List of Portuguese locomotives and railcars
- History of rail transport in Portugal
