= Rossio railway station =

Railway station in Portugal

Rossio Estação Ferroviária do Rossio
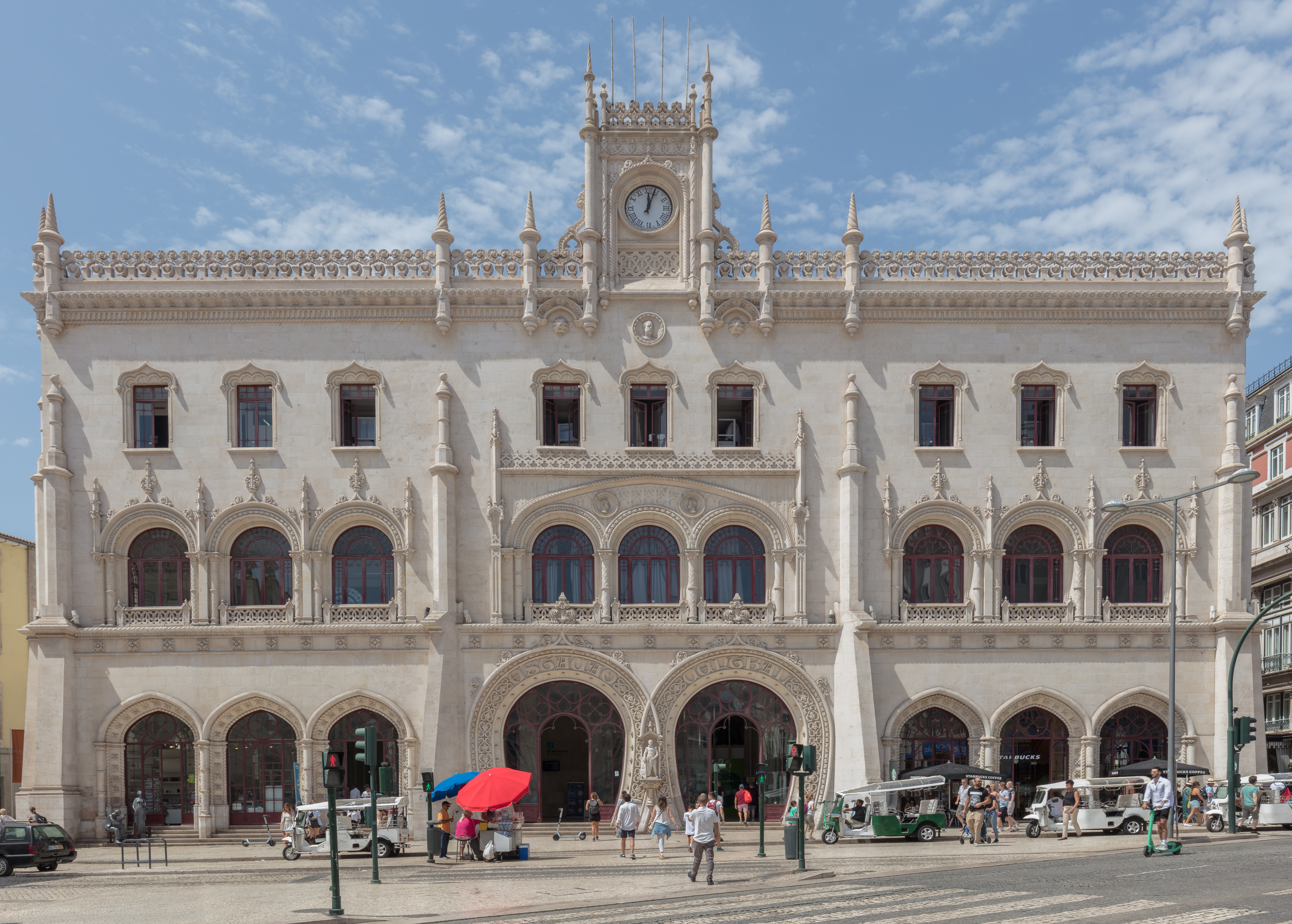
- Main façade towards Rossio Square.

General information
- Location: Rua 1º de Dezembro 125, 1249-970, Lisboa; Portugal
- Coordinates: 38°42′53″N 9°8′32″W
- Line: Sintra Line
- Connections: Restauradores

History
- Opened: May 1891
- Former names: Estação Central (Central Station)

Services
Preceding station	Lisbon CP	Following station
Campolide towards Sintra	Sintra Line	Terminus
Campolide towards Mira Sintra-Meleças	Sintra Line	Terminus
Location
- Location within Lisbon Location within Portugal

The Rossio Railway Station ([ʁuˈsi.u]; Portuguese: Estação de Caminhos de Ferro do Rossio) is a railway station in Lisbon, Portugal, located in the Rossio square. The station was formerly known as Estação Central (Central Station) and that designation still appears in its façade. Trains gain access to the station, which is in the central urban area of Lisbon, through a tunnel which is over 2.9 km (1.8 mi) long.

== History ==
The station was commissioned by the Portuguese Royal Railway Company and was designed between 1886 and 1887 by Portuguese architect José Luís Monteiro. It was built in one of the most important squares of Lisbon, the Rossio, and connected the city to the region of Sintra.

The tunnel was excavated under the city and is considered one of the most important works of engineering in Portugal dating from the 19th century. It was completed in 1890, and soon after Lisbon's Circle Line with a connection to the North Line also opened. The station became Lisbon's main passenger terminus until 1957, from that date only a few long-distance trains terminated at Rossio, mainly West Line services, until the early 1990s.

Sidónio Pais, the fourth President of Portugal, was assassinated in Rossio Station in December 1918.

The station was closed to rail services from 22 October 2004 until 12 February 2008 due to tunnel renewal work.

== Architecture ==
The Neo-Manueline façade dominates the northwest side of the square and is a Romantic recreation of the exuberant Manueline style, typical of early 16th century Portugal. Its most interesting features are the two intertwined horseshoe portals at the entrance, the clock in a small turret and the abundant sculptural decoration. Inside, the platforms are connected by ramps to the façade level and are covered by a cast-iron structure executed by a Belgian firm. The station is an important example of Romantic (façade) and cast-iron (platform cover) architecture in Portugal.

The western wall of the train shed has a series of tiled pictures mixing classic religious themes with modern views of Lisbon.

In May 2016, the 126-year-old statue of Sebastian of Portugal by Gabriel Faraill which stood in the niche between the entrance portals was accidentally destroyed by a man who knocked it over climbing up for a selfie. The statue was repaired in August 2020, but due to the fragility of its restored state, it was moved to another location and protected within a glass case. A replica was commissioned for the original location and was installed in July 2021. The replica was created by sculptor Pedro Lino, who worked from the original plaster model.

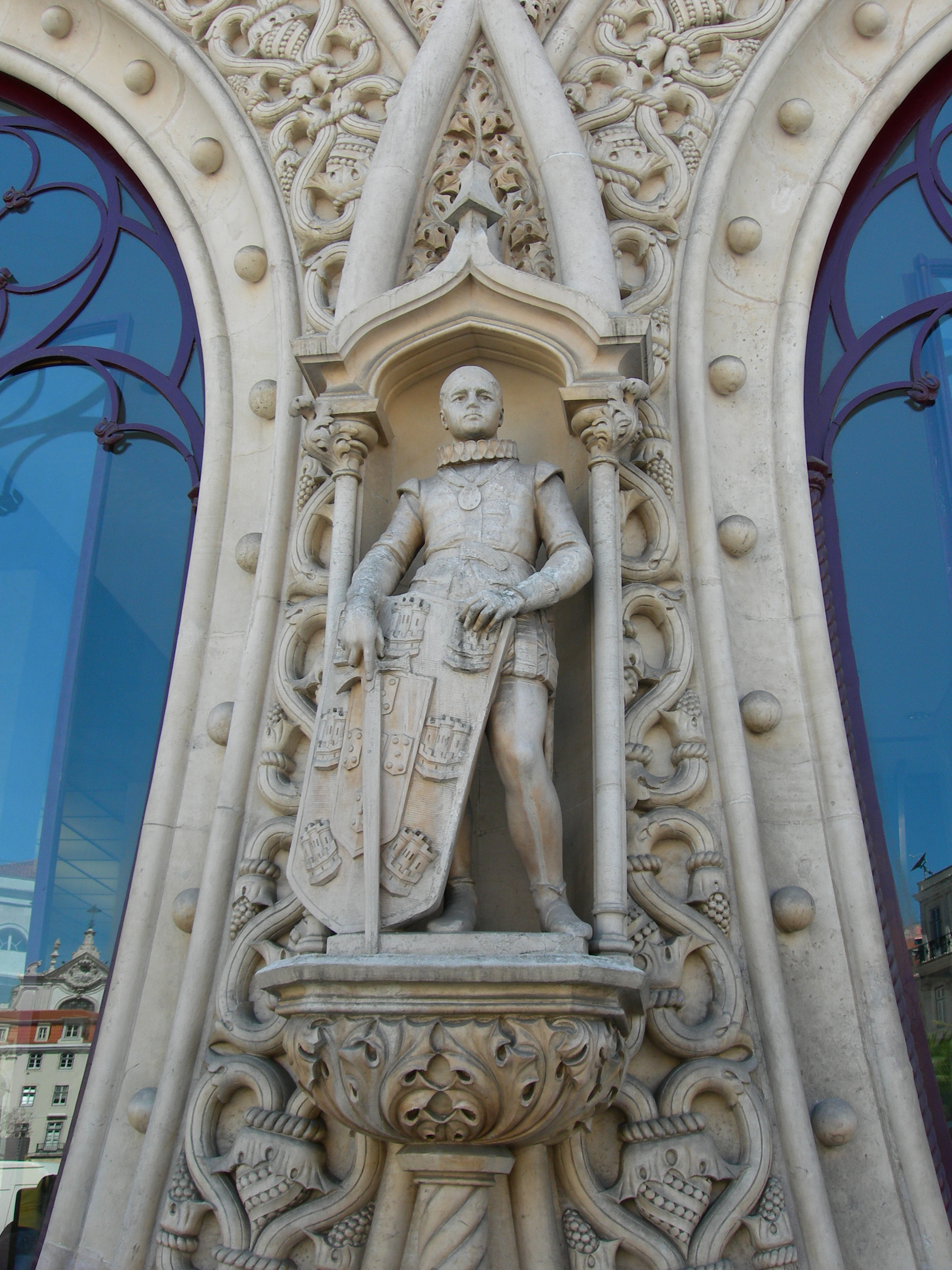
Statue of King Sebastian of Portugal on the façade of the station. The statue was accidentally destroyed in 2016

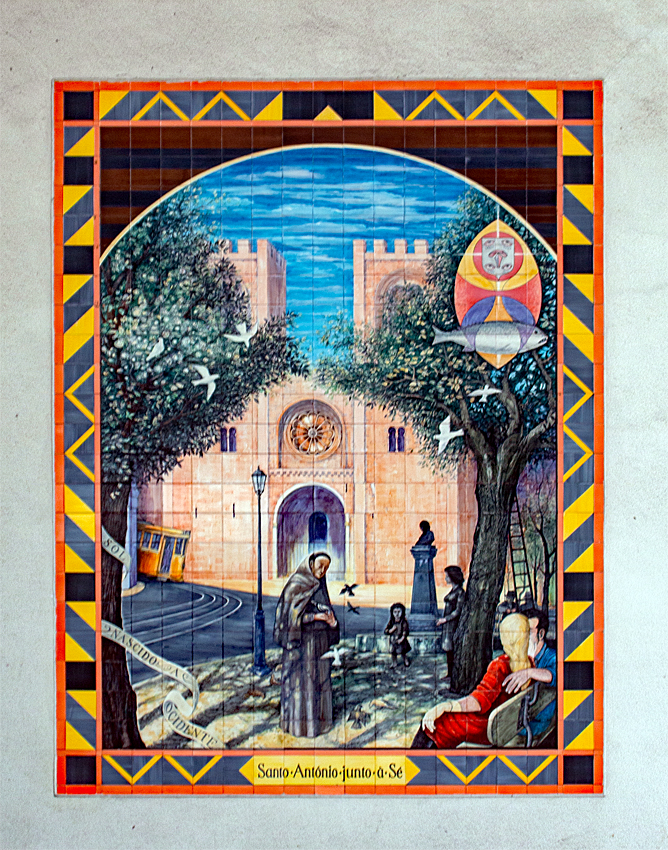
Tiled picture on train shed wall

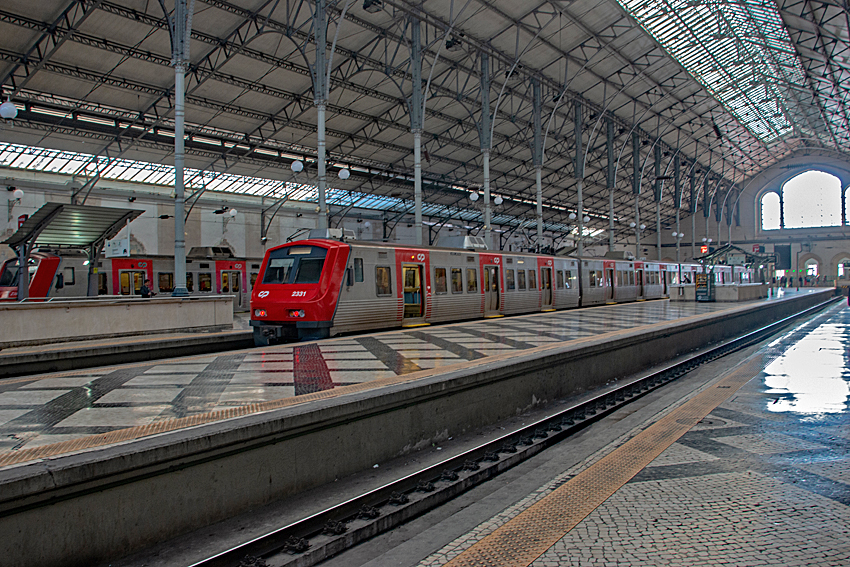
Rossio station interior with Class 2300 awaiting departure

== See also ==
- Gare do Oriente
- Lisbon Metro
