= Sintra railway station =

Railway station in Sintra, Portugal

Sintra
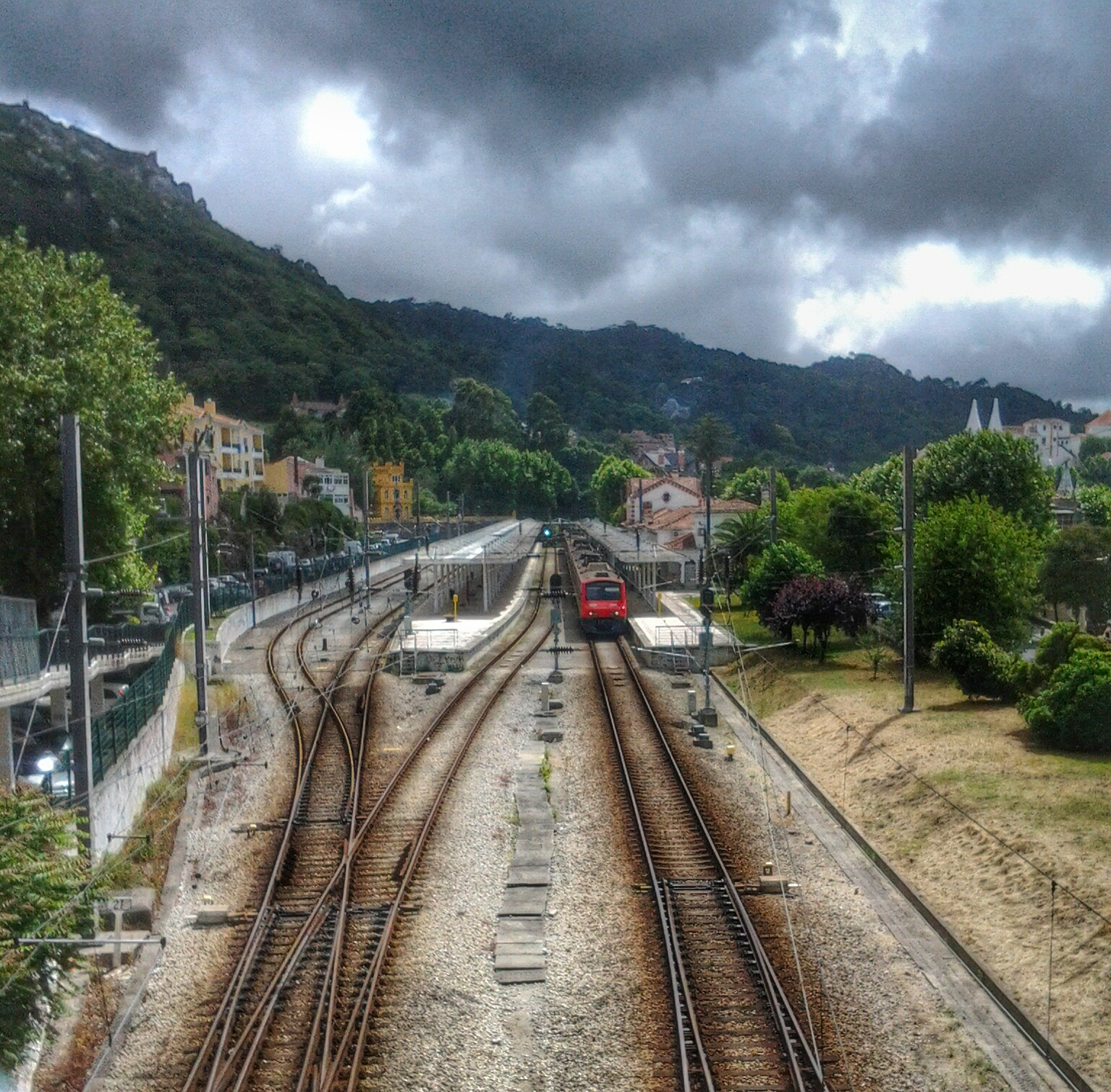
- View of Sintra Station from the northeast, June 2014

General information
- Location: 2710-590 Sintra; Portugal
- Coordinates: 38.7993°N 9.3855°W
- Elevation: 210 metres (690 ft)
- Operator: Lisbon CP
- Manager: Infraestruturas de Portugal
- Line: Sintra Line
- Distance: 27.2 kilometres (16.9 mi) from Rossio
- Platforms: 1 island platform + 1 side platform
- Tracks: 3

Construction
- Accessible: Yes

History
- Opened: 2 April 1887

Services
Preceding station	Lisbon CP	Following station
Terminus	Sintra Line	Portela de Sintra towards Rossio
Terminus	Sintra Line	Portela de Sintra towards Oriente
Terminus	Sintra Line	Portela de Sintra towards Alverca
Location

Sintra Station (Portuguese: Estação Ferroviária de Sintra) is a railway station in the town Sintra and the terminus of the Sintra Line from Rossio, one of the main stations in Lisbon. It is managed by Infraestruturas de Portugal.

== Lines ==
- Sintra Line
  - The journey from Rossio to Sintra takes 39 minutes.
  - Trains run at approximately 15-minute intervals on weekdays and 30-minute intervals on weekends.

== Station layout ==
Sintra Station consists of one island platform and one side platform serving three tracks.

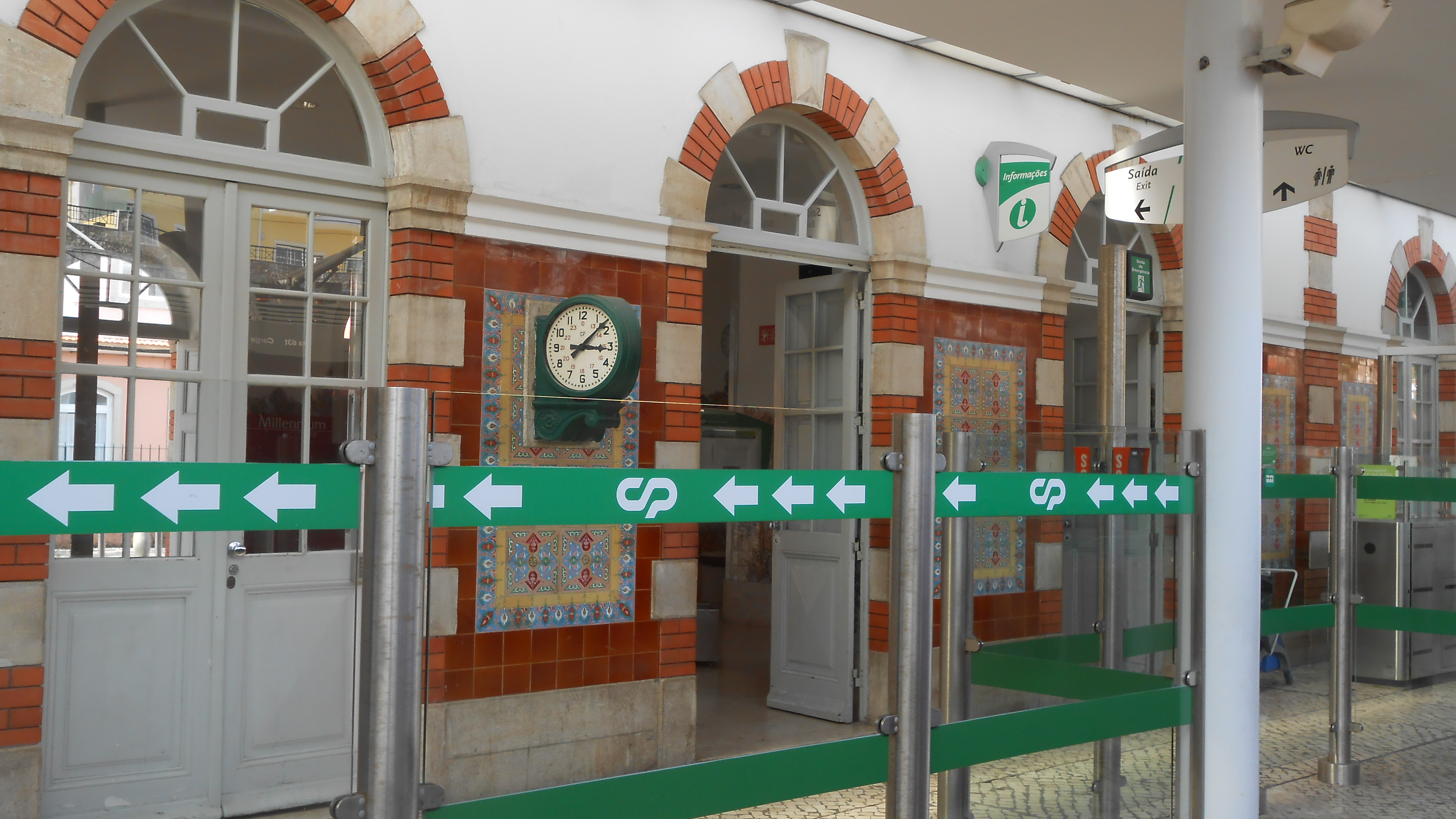
The interior of Sintra Station, March 2014

== History ==
Sintra Station opened on 2 April 1887, originally as the terminus of the Sintra Line to Alcântara-Terra. The terminus was shifted to Rossio following that station's completion on 11 June 1890.

== Surrounding area ==
The 434 tourist bus route stops in front of the station, and provides access to various tourist attractions and heritage sites in the Sintra area.

- Sintra National Palace
- Castle of the Moors
- Pena Palace
