= Alcântara-Terra railway station =

Railway station in Lisbon, Portugal

Alcântara-Terra
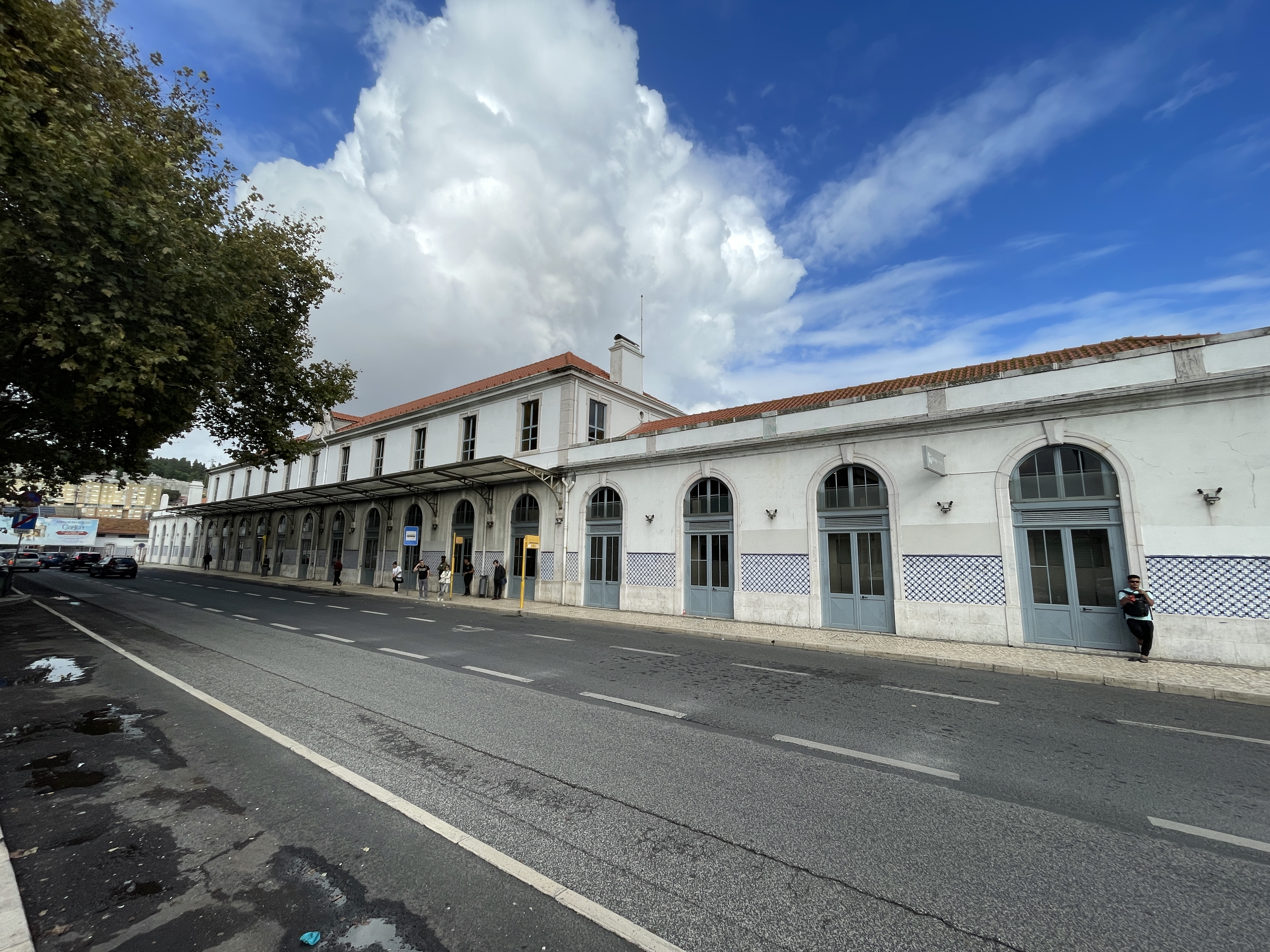
- Frontage of the Alcantara-Terra station, 2024

General information
- Location: Lisbon; Portugal
- Coordinates: 38°42′26.74″N 9°10′23.76″W
- Owner: Infraestruturas de Portugal
- Line: Cintura Line
- Platforms: 2 island platforms + 1 side platform
- Tracks: 8
- Train operators: Comboios de Portugal
- Connections: Cascais Line: Alcântara-Mar Carris Carris Metropolitana

History
- Opened: 2 April 1887

Services
Preceding station	Lisbon CP	Following station
Terminus	Azambuja Line	Campolide-A towards Castanheira do Ribatejo
Terminus	Azambuja Line Limited service	Campolide-A towards Azambuja
Location

Alcântara-Terra railway station (Portuguese: Estação Ferroviária de Alcântara-Terra), is a railway station on the Cintura Line in the city of Lisbon, Portugal. The station is connected by foot to Alcântara-Mar railway station on the Cascais Line.

== Services ==
The station is used by suburban trains of the Azambuja line during weekdays, operated by Comboios de Portugal. Trains have a headway of roughly 30 minutes when serving this station on weekdays, except during the early morning and late night. As of the most recent schedule, no trains serve this station on weekends. As a terminus station, all trains either begin or end at this station.

== Station layout ==
The station is composed of two island platforms and a side platform serving three tracks. An additional five tracks are located adjacent to the station for stabling.

== History ==
The Royal Company of Portuguese Railways proposed a railway to run from Alcântara to Torres Vedras, with branches to Sintra and Aldeia Galega da Merceana in January 1882; parliament quickly authorized the scheme in May. Although construction was first awarded to Henry Burnay & Company, the concession was transferred to the Royal Company itself in 1883. Alcântara-Terra station opened on 2 April 1887 as the Lisbon terminus of the original Sintra and Oeste lines. It remained the starting point of the Oeste Line until the opening of Rossio railway station in July 1891.

The new station already possessed a glazed canopy and a shed for 24 carriages. Cabs could be taken from the station square, and a horse-drawn tram established a passenger connection to central Lisbon. The complex was sat on land formerly used by a saltpetre refinery and later by the Ministry of War's archive. Construction also required enclosing another stretch of the Alcântara stream. A branch to Alcântara-Mar, connecting the Oeste and Cascais lines, opened on 10 August 1891. Demand was strong from the outset: in August 1887, trains serving Sintra, Torres Vedras, and Caldas da Rainha reportedly could not accommodate all passengers on a festival Sunday.

The station was initially seeing ongoing modernization: electric-disc signalling arrived in 1902, followed by a new weighbridge a year later. It reflected the increasing importance of the station as a freight hub; by 1914 the station functioned as a major Portuguese cork depot. That January, a large transport strike included sabotage at Alcântara-Terra: telegraph equipment was destroyed to halt trains and locomotives were derailed, prompting police intervention. Fish shipments were redirected To Alcantâra-Terra in 1928 to relieve Santa Apolónia station, and remodeling and repairs followed in 1933–1934. However, after the opening of Cais do Sodré railway station in 1928, trains to Cascais were diverted to that station, and Alcântara-Terra lost its place on the line to the nearby facility Alcântara-Mar.

In 1940, special trains with refurbished carriages serving the Portuguese World Exhibition departed from the station. Electrification of the Alcântara–Campolide section of the Cintura was planned during the 1950s. Proposals to divert Sintra and Oeste services to Alcântara-Terra during the Rossio Tunnel works were however rejected because of the station's distance from central Lisbon and because of heavy port traffic. In 1958, the Sintra Line's first service using three-car electric multiple units departed from Alcântara-Terra.

By the final years of the 20th century, the station met with a mixed fate. In 1992 regular passenger service was restored, and in 1999 new electric trains established a regular Alcântara-Terra to Vila Franca de Xira service. However, the opening of the rail link across the 25 de Abril Bridge in 1999, which bypassed Alcântara-Terra altogether, still relegated it to secondary suburban status in the Lisbon rail network. The complex's under-use is also a consequence of its limited connectivity to other services; the walk to the Alcântara-Mar on the Cascais line is substantial at 800 meters, and there are no metro or tram services. Several bus lines, however, do stop in front of the station

== Future conversion to an underground station ==
In May 2006, Lisbon City Council presented several solutions for the so-called Alcântara Junction, involving the creation of a grade-separated junction between the Cascais and Cintura Lines.This was followed by a government announcement two years later of a 407-million euro investment for the Alcântara area, which included a scheme involving the creation of a new railway junction. In anticipation, the overpass between the station and Alcântara-Mar was demolished in 2008, allegedly due to its advanced state of disrepair and lack of social safety. Most of these and other plans floundered because of Portugal's difficult budgetary condition in the wake of the 2008 financial crisis.

In 2020, new plans were presented as part of the national infrastructure agenda 2030, to restore the connection between Alcântara-Terra and the Linha de Cintura with the existing Cascais line near Alcântara-Mar to full capacity. This would include a grade-separated, underground junction through Alcântara and a new underground Alcântara-Terra station, replacing the present terminus. A separate underground rail connection to the Port of Lisbon is also included. To date, no construction work has been initiated.

== Surrounding area ==
- Jardim dos Cactos
- Carris Museum

== Gallery ==
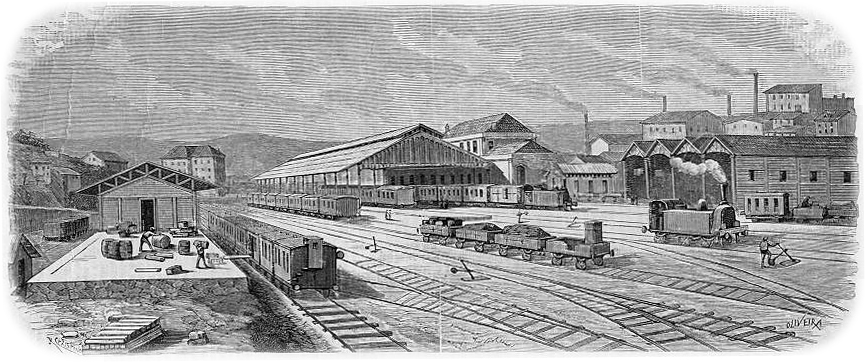
View of the newly opened Alcântara Station from the north, 1887.

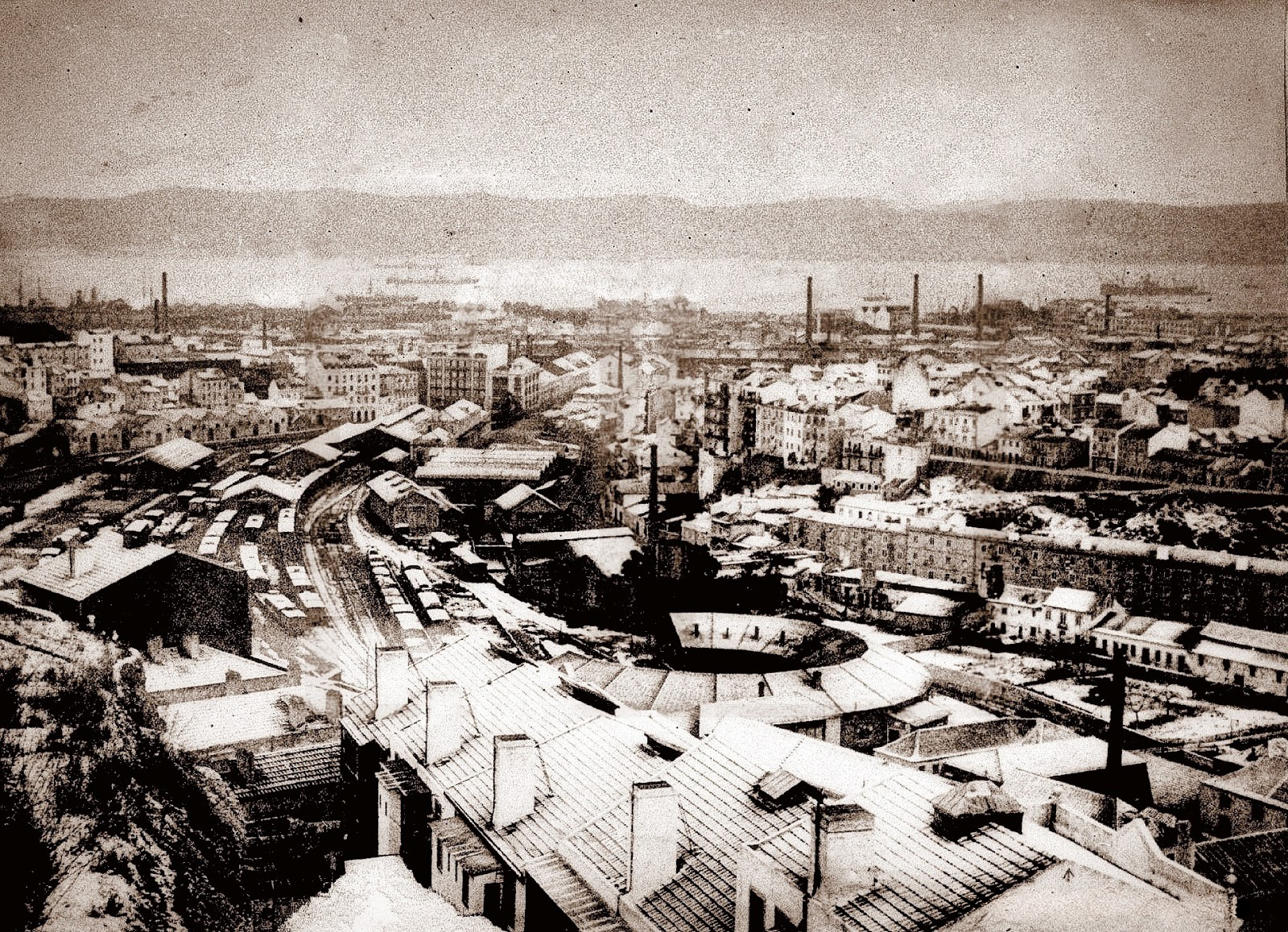
Snow in Lisbon on the morning after Christmas in 1926. View from Prazeres toward Alcântara.

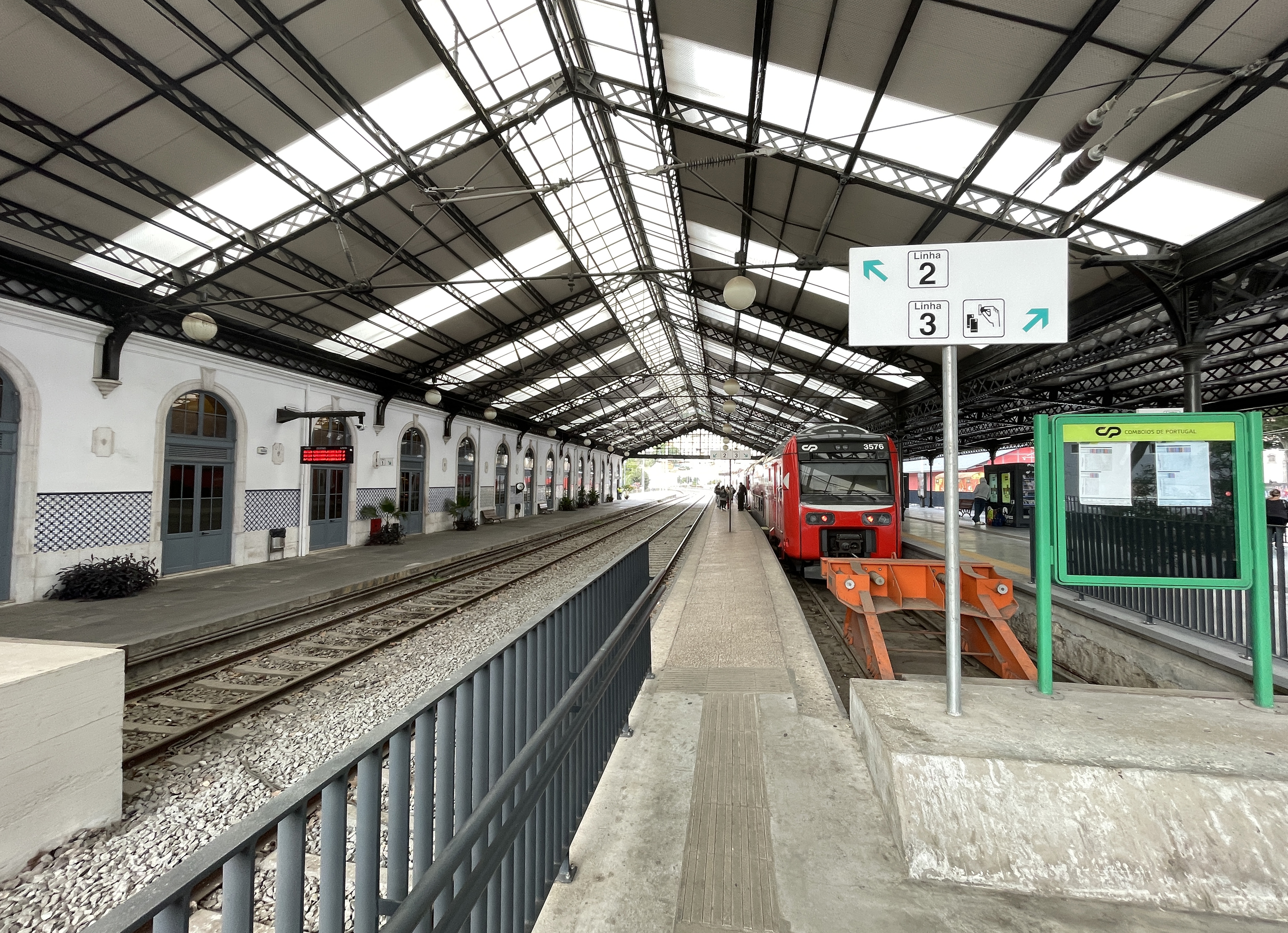
The train shed of Alcântara-Terra railway station in Lisbon, 2024.

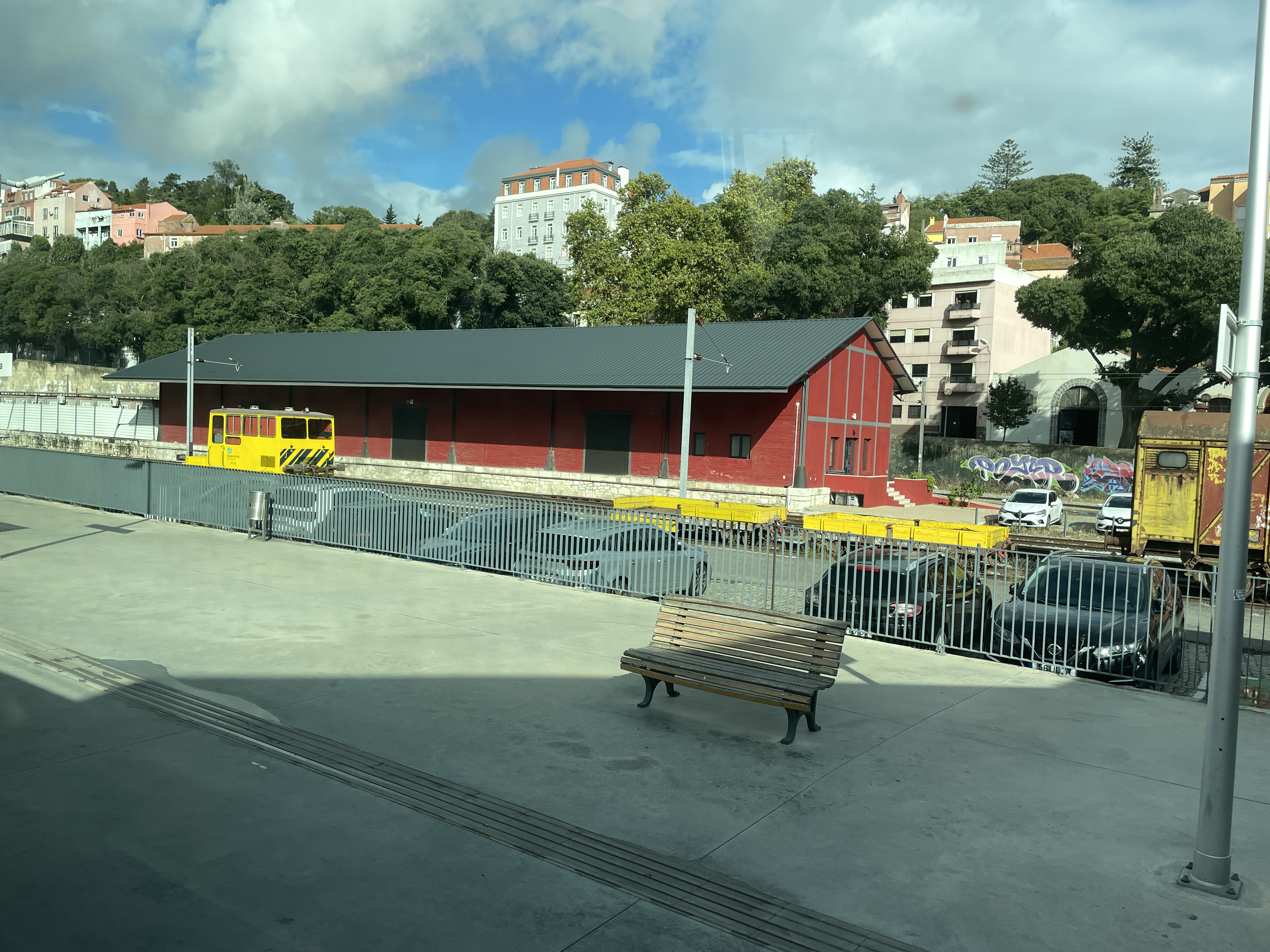
The goods pavillion at Alcântara-Terra railway station in Lisbon, 2024.

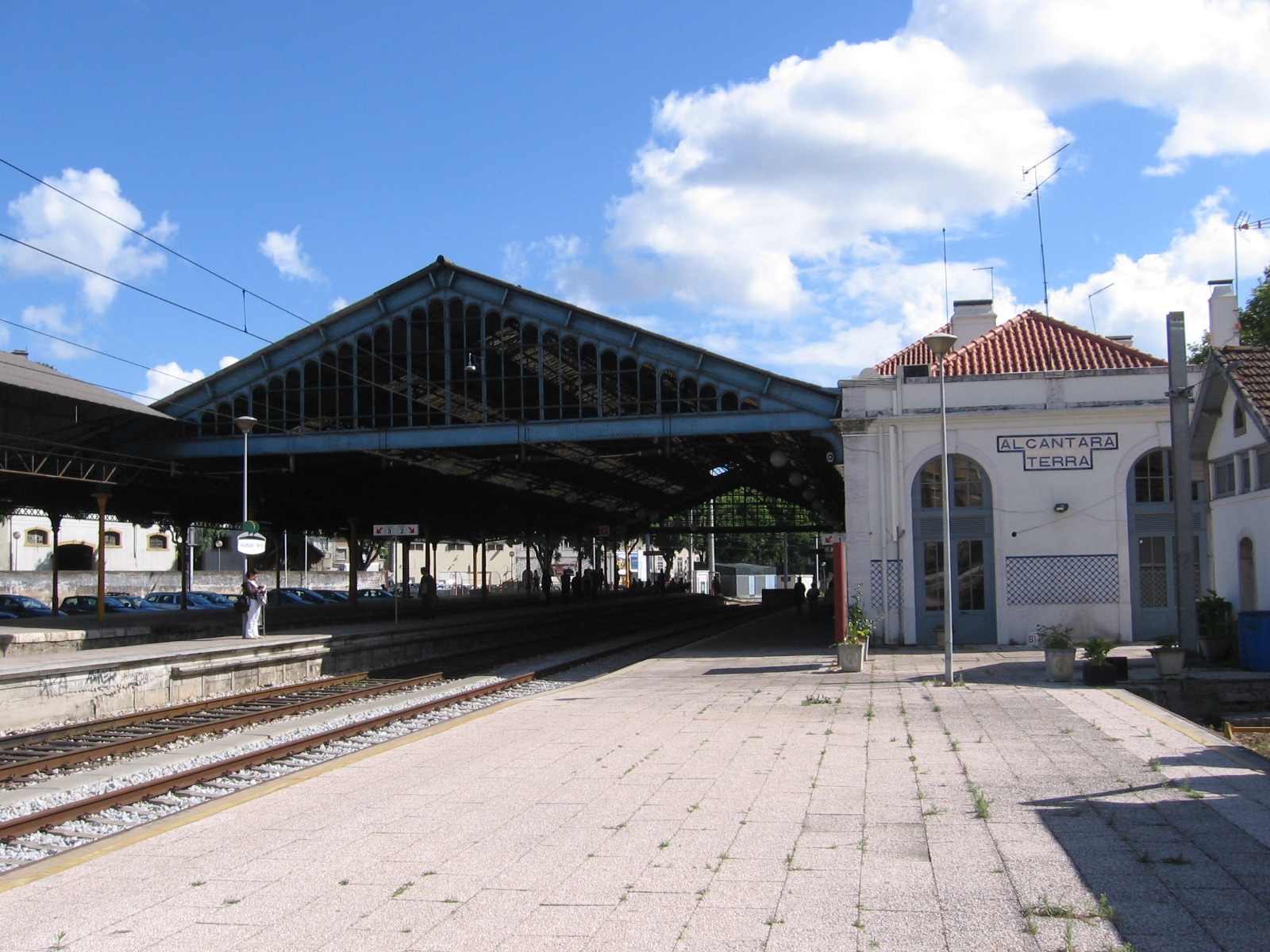
View from a platform at Alcântara-Terra Station, May 2008.

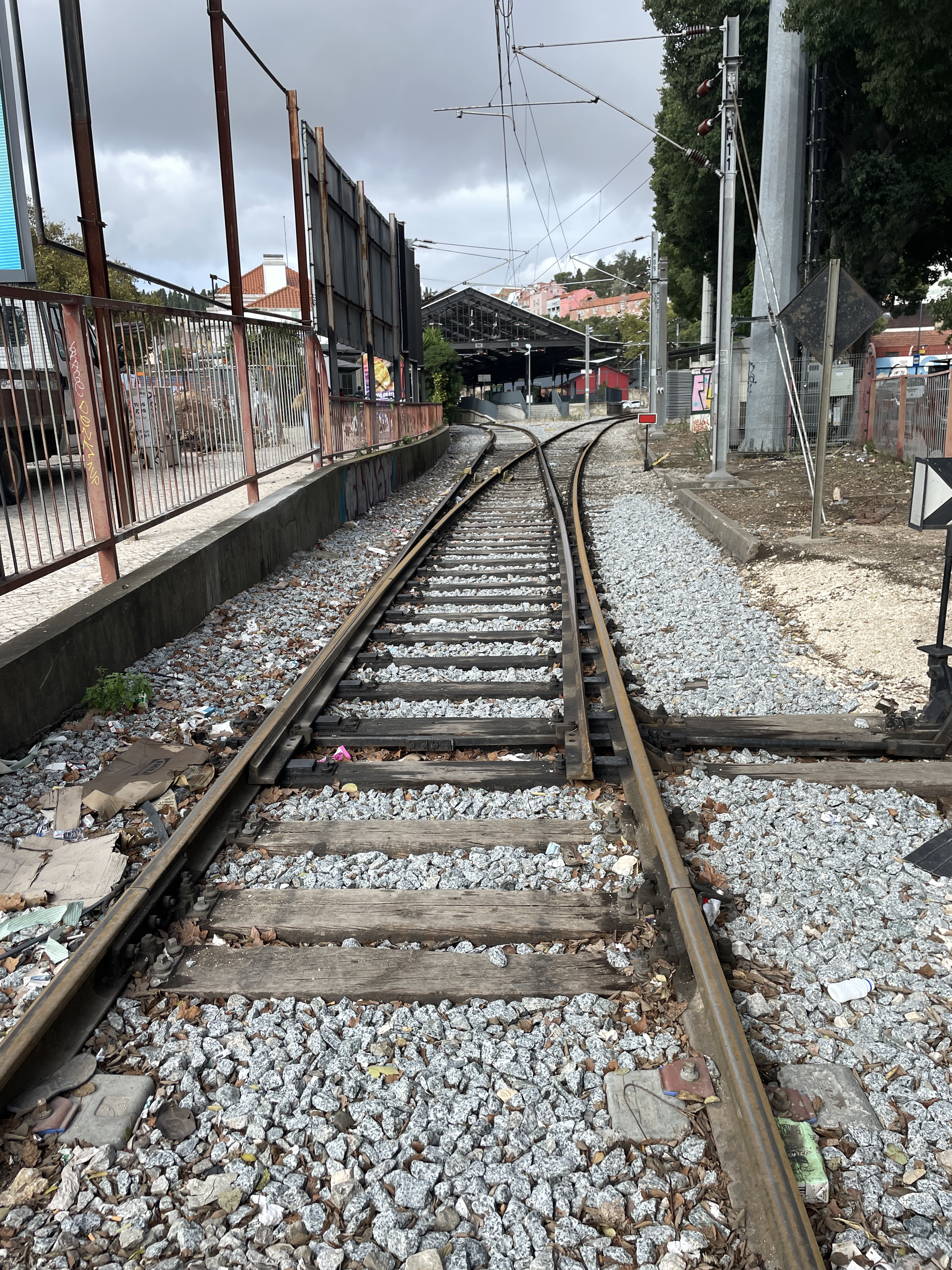
View of Alcântara-Terra railway station from the south, overlooking the link to the Cascais Line, 2024.

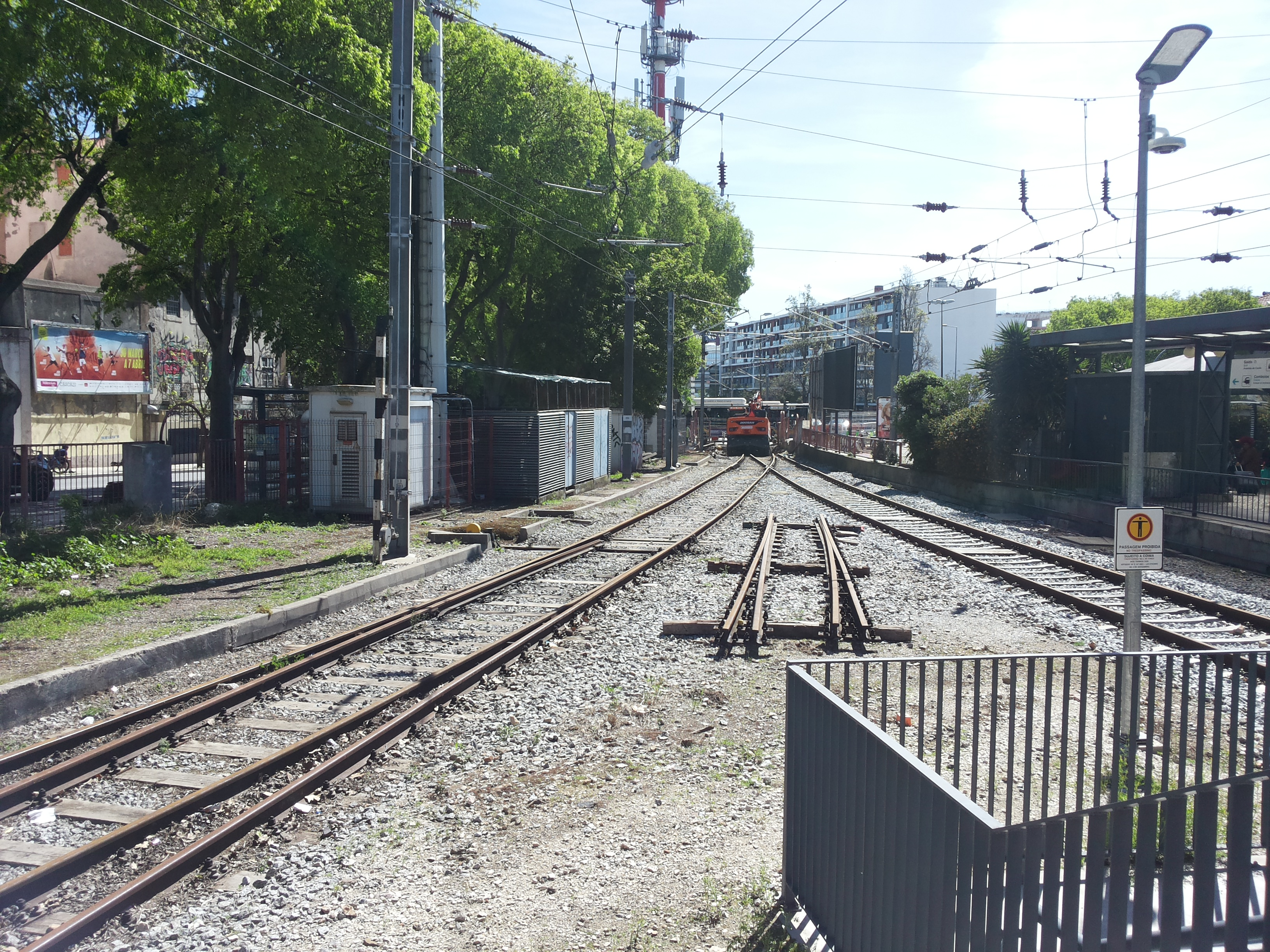
Exit/entrance switch of Alcântara-Terra, facing Alcântara-Mar, 2024.

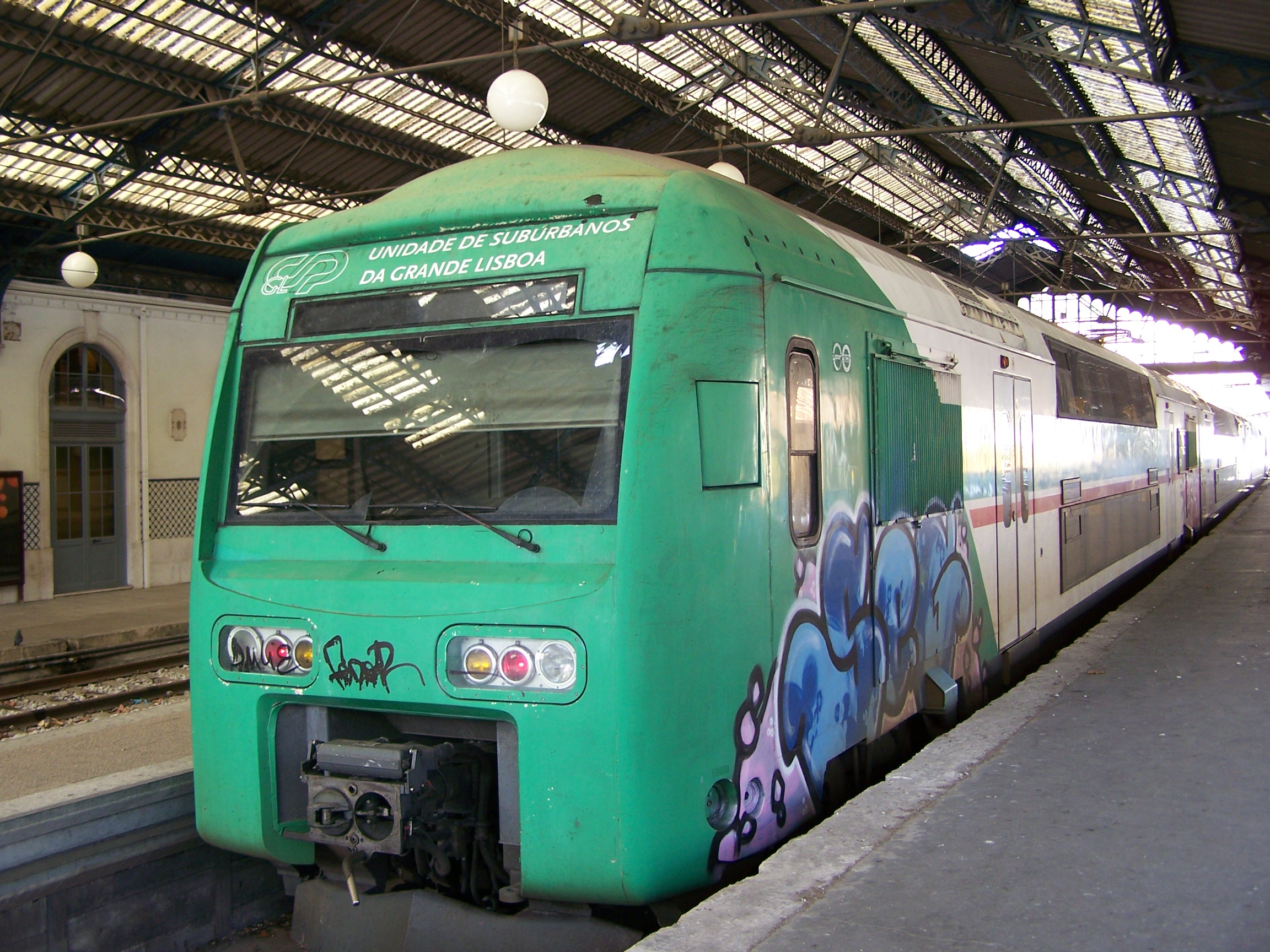
Portuguese train type 3500 at Lisbon Alcântara Terra train station, 2008.
