= Sintra Line =

Portuguese railway line

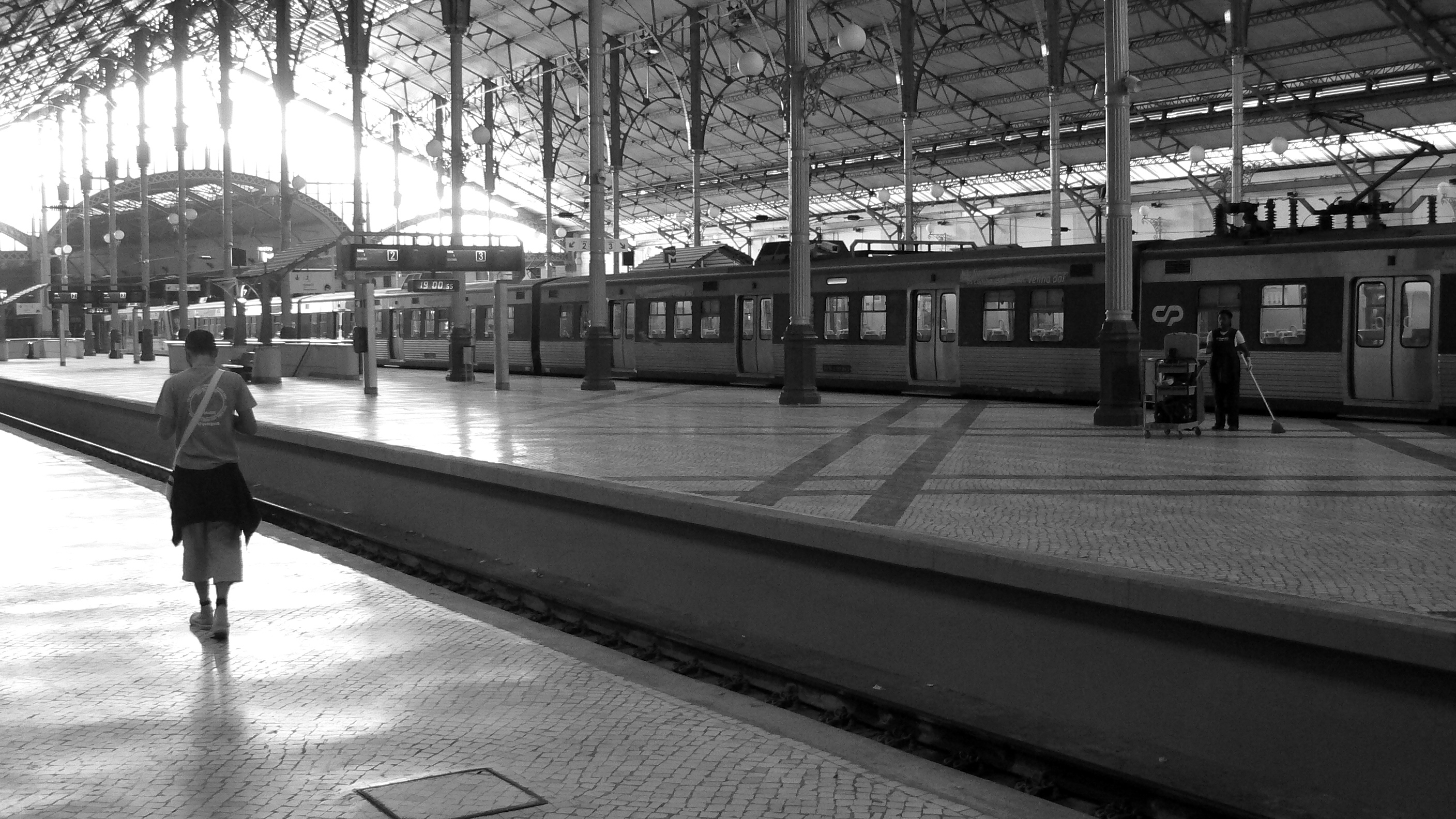
- Rossio railway station

Overview
- Native name: Linha de Sintra
- Status: Operational
- Locale: Lisbon, Amadora and Sintra, Portugal
- Termini: Rossio; Sintra
- Connecting lines: Cintura Line, Oeste Line
- Stations: 15

Service
- Type: Heavy rail

Technical
- Line length: 27.2 km (16.9 mi)
- Number of tracks: Double-track (From Rossio to Campolide, from Agualva-Cacém to Sintra) and Quadruple-track (From Campolide to Agualva-Cacém)
- Track gauge: 1,668 mm (5 ft 5 21/32 in) Iberian gauge
- Electrification: 25 kV / 50 Hz Overhead line
Route map
Location on the network

Linha de Sintra is a railway line that connects the stations of Rossio and Sintra, Portugal. and is operated by Comboios de Portugal.

== History ==
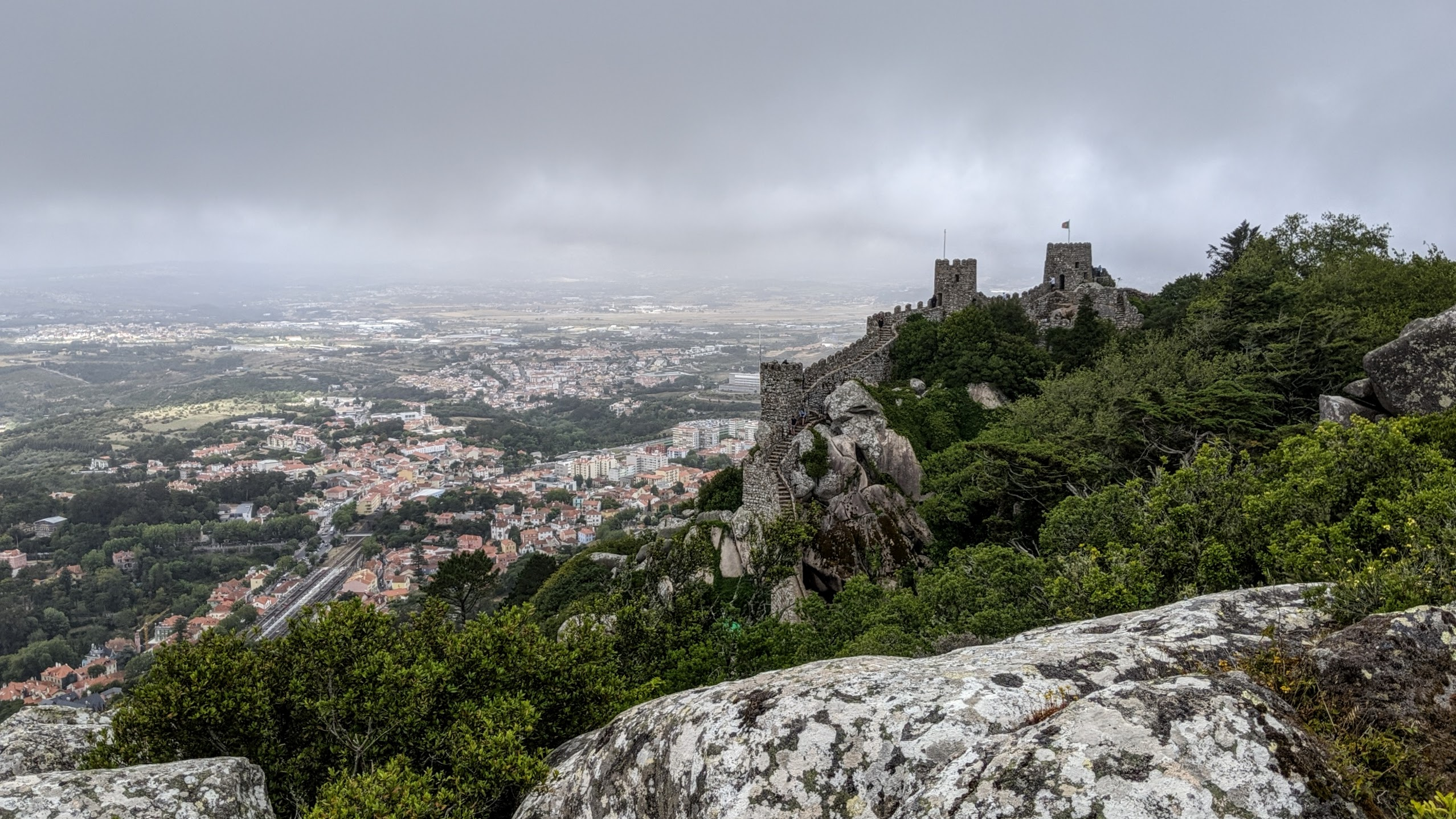
Sintra from Castle of the Moors, with station visible at lower left

The railway, one of the first to be planned in Portugal, was opened on 2 April 1887. The southern terminus was changed from Alcântara-Terra to Rossio, after the station was inaugurated in June 1891. The duplication works were completed on 20 January 1949, and during the 1950s, the line was electrified. New rolling stock was introduced in the 1990s. Quadruple-tracking between Benfica and Amadora had been completed by September 1999.

== See also ==
- List of railway lines in Portugal
- History of rail transport in Portugal
