= Ramal de Reguengos =

Portuguese railway line

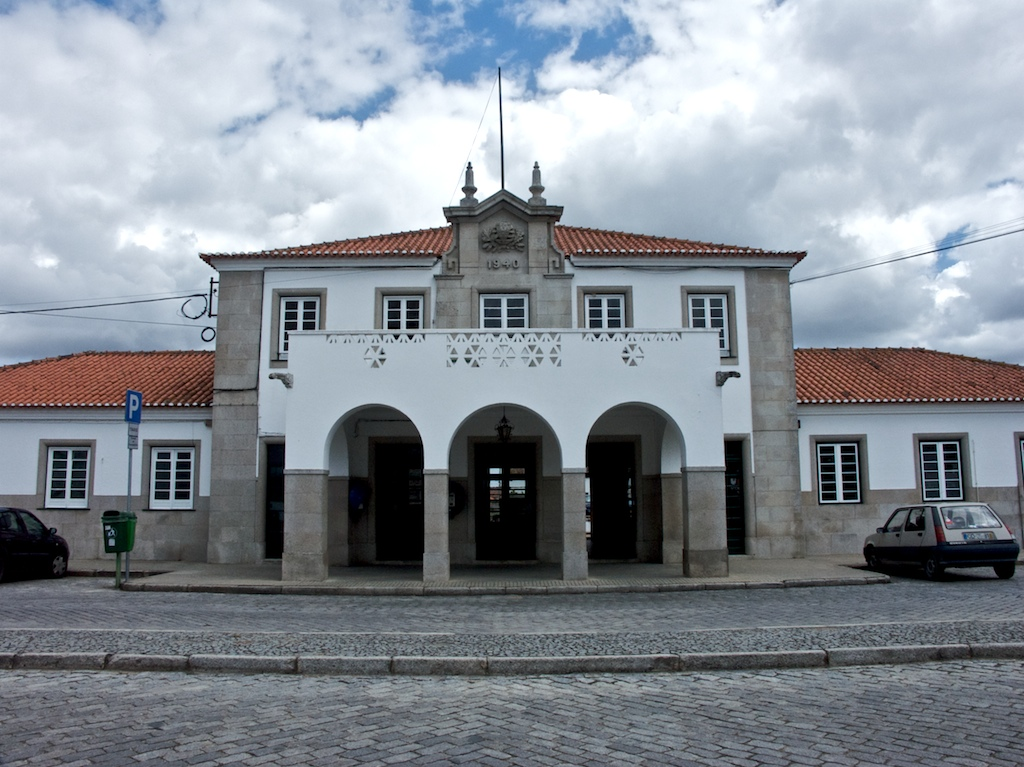
- Évora station

Overview
- Status: closed
- Termini: Évora; Reguengos de Monsaraz

History
- Opened: 1927
- Closed: 1988

Technical
- Line length: 40.6 km (25.2 mi)
- Track gauge: 1,668 mm (5 ft 5 21/32 in) Iberian gauge
Route map
Location on the network

Ramal de Reguengos, originally called Linha do Guadiana, was a railway branch line which connected the stations of Évora and Reguengos de Monsaraz, in Portugal. It was opened on 6 April 1927.

In the 1920s and 1930s, the Portuguese and Spanish governments debated about extending the line across the border to Zafra. However, by the mid-1930s, the project had fizzled away.

On 29 August 1988, the then-commercial director of Caminhos de Ferro Portugueses announced plans in Diário de Lisboa to close the passenger services on the line, limiting traffic to freight trains, and to replace it with a bus service due to reduced demand. Simultaneously, the passenger traffic on the Moura and Portalegre lines was also announced to be terminated. This move was harshly criticized by railway unions and the local authorities. This began the decline of the line.

On July 30, 2023, the company Infraestruturas de Portugal reported that work had already begun to transform the line into an eco-trail. This project was coordinated by the Intermunicipal Community of Alentejo Central, after signing a subconcession contract with the Heritage Division of Infraestruturas de Portugal. After its completion, the trail was integrated into the Grande Rota do Montado, an extensive network of pedestrian and cycling routes, around 182 km of which take advantage of old railway routes, such as the Ramal de Mora, akin to greenway projects.

== See also ==
- List of railway lines in Portugal
- History of rail transport in Portugal
