= Ramal do Louriçal =

Portuguese railway line

Linha do Leste
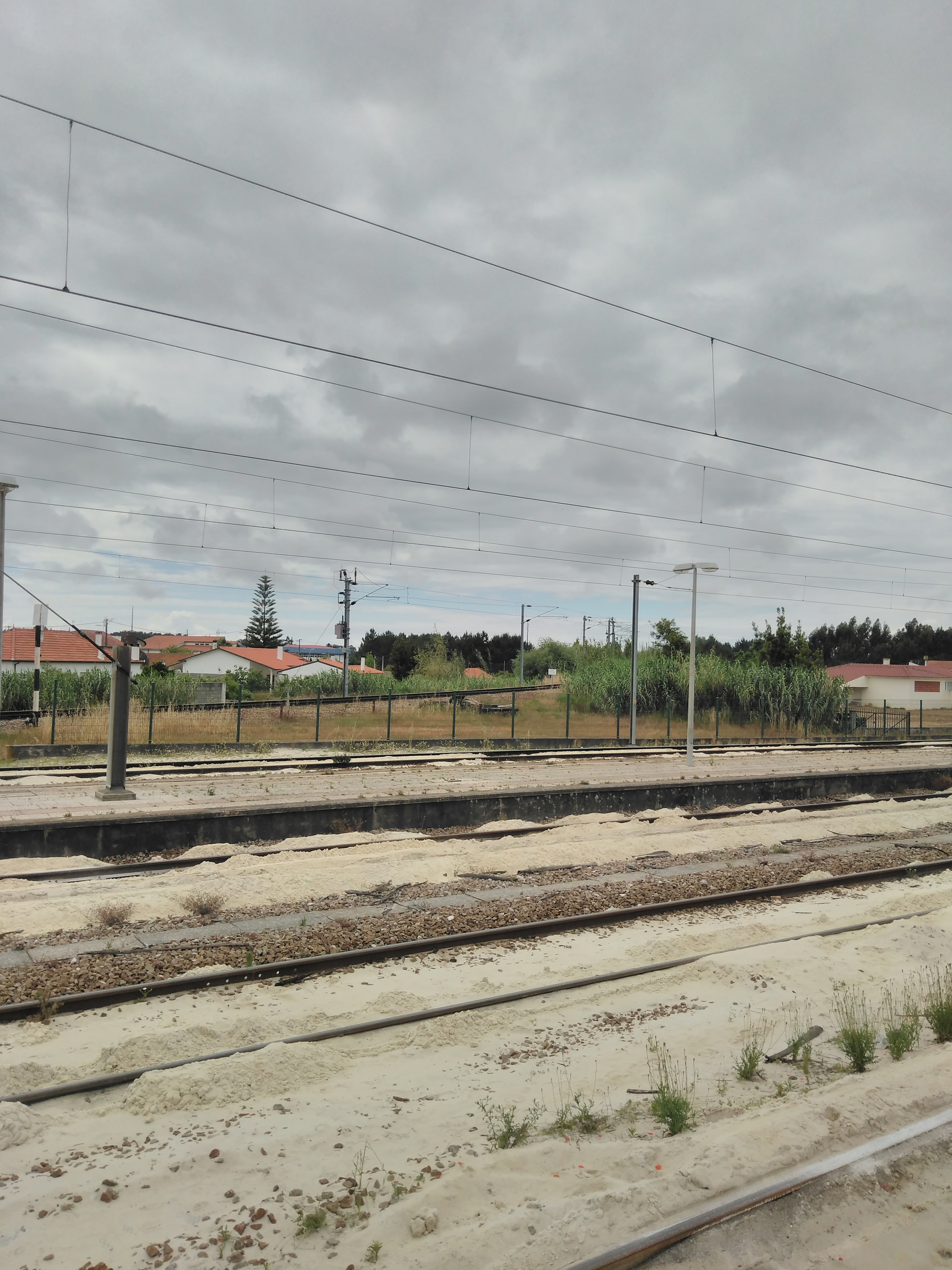
- Louriçal railway station

Overview
- Status: Operational
- Owner: Infraestruturas de Portugal
- Termini: Louriçal; Celbi and The Navigator Company

Technical
- Line length: 7 km (4.3 mi)
- Track gauge: 1,668 mm (5 ft 5 21/32 in) Iberian gauge

Location on the network
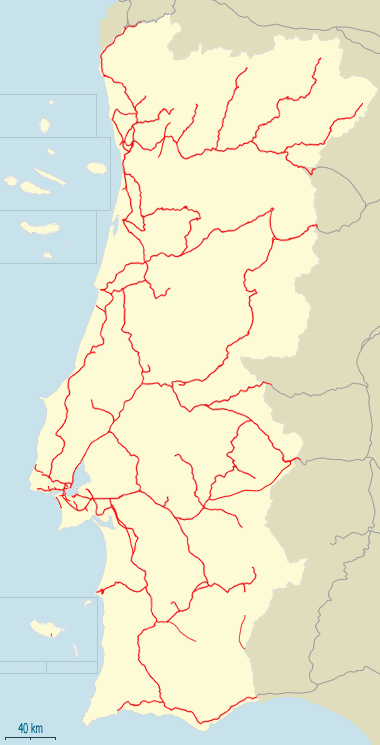

+ Louriçal × Navigator (🔎)

Ramal do Louriçal is a Portuguese railway line managed by Infraestruturas de Portugal which connects Louriçal railway station, on the Linha do Oeste, to two paper factories: Celbi and The Navigator Company. The electrified freight line was opened in 1993.

== See also ==
- List of railway lines in Portugal
- List of Portuguese locomotives and railcars
- History of rail transport in Portugal
