= List of railway lines in Portugal =

This is a list of railway lines in Portugal.

Map of the railway lines of Portugal.

== List ==
Name	Route	Opened	Length	Gauge	Electrification	Status
Alentejo line	Barreiro–Funcheira	1857–1888	166.3 km (103.3 mi)	Iberian	25 kV AC Barreiro–Casa Branca and Ourique–Funcheira	Operational
Ramal da Alfândega	Porto-Campanhã–Porto-Alfândega	1888	3.89 km (2.42 mi)	Iberian		Closed in 1989
Ramal de Alfarelos	Alfarelos–Bifurcação de Lares	1889	16.5 km (10.3 mi)	Iberian	25 kV AC	Operational
Algarve line	Lagos–Vila Real de Santo António	1889–1922	139.5 km (86.7 mi)	Iberian	25 kV AC Tunes–Faro	Operational
Ramal de Aljustrel	Castro Verde-Almodôvar–São João do Deserto	1929	11.6 km (7.2 mi)	Iberian		Closed
Ramal de Aveiro	Sernada do Vouga–Aveiro	1911	37.7 km (23.4 mi)	Metre		Operational
Ramal de Aveiro-Mar	Aveiro–Canal do Cojo	1913	0.9 km (0.56 mi)	Metre		Closed
Barca d'Alva–La Fuente de San Esteban railway	Barca d'Alva–La Fuente de San Esteban-Boadilla	1887	77.5 km (48.2 mi)	Iberian		Closed in 1985
Beira Alta line	Pampilhosa–Vilar Formoso	1882	202 km (126 mi)	Iberian	25 kV AC	Operational
Beira Baixa line	Entroncamento–Guarda	1891–1893	240.2 km (149.3 mi)	Iberian	25 kV AC Entroncamento–Covilhã	Operational
Ramal de Braga	Nine–Braga	1875	15 km (9.3 mi)	Iberian	25 kV AC	Operational
Cascais line	Cais do Sodré–Cascais	1889	25.4 km (15.8 mi)	Iberian	1500 V DC	Operational
Cintura line	Doca de Alcântara–Braço de Prata	1888	10.5 km (6.5 mi)	Iberian	25 kV AC Alcântara-Terra–Braço de Prata	Operational
Corgo line	Chaves–Régua	1906–1921	96.1 km (59.7 mi)	Metre		Closed in 2009
Ramal de Cáceres	Torre das Vargens–Marvão-Beirã	1879	81.5 km (50.6 mi)	Iberian		Closed in 2012
Douro line	Ermesinde–Pocinho	1872–1887	192 km (119 mi)	Iberian	25 kV AC Ermesinde–Caíde	Operational
Dão line	Santa Comba Dão–Viseu	1890	49.2 km (30.6 mi)	Metre		Closed in 1989
Ramal do Estádio Nacional	Cruz Quebrada–Estádio Nacional	1944	1.6 km (0.99 mi)	Iberian	1500 V DC	Closed
Évora line	Casa Branca–Évora	1863	36.3 km (22.6 mi)	Iberian	25 kV AC	Operational
Ramal da Figueira da Foz	Figueira da Foz–Pampilhosa	1882	50.4 km (31.3 mi)	Iberian		Closed in 2009
Guimarães line	Lousado–Guimarães	1883–1884	30.5 km (19.0 mi)	Iberian	25 kV AC	Operational
Leixões line	Contumil–Leixões	1938	18.7 km (11.6 mi)	Iberian	25 kV AC	Operational
Leste line	Abrantes–Elvas	1863	146.2 km (90.8 mi)	Iberian		Operational
Ramal do Louriçal	Louriçal–Celbi and The Navigator Company	1993	7 km (4.3 mi)	Iberian	25 kV AC	Operational
Ramal da Lousã	Coimbra-B–Coimbra	1885	1.7 km (1.1 mi)	Iberian	25 kV AC	Closed in 2025
Ramal da Base Aérea da Maceda	Carvalheira-Maceda–Aeródromo Militar de Ovar		0.59 km (0.37 mi)	Iberian		Closed
Ramal de Maceira-Liz	Martingança–Maceira-Liz	1921	5 km (3.1 mi)	Iberian		Operational
Matinha line	Lisboa-Santa Apolónia–Cais da Matinha		2.8 km (1.7 mi)	Iberian		Operational
Ramal de Matosinhos	Senhora da Hora–Leixões	1884	6 km (3.7 mi)	Metre		Closed in 1965
Minho line	Porto-São Bento–Valença	1882	133.6 km (83.0 mi)	Iberian	25 kV AC Porto-São Bento–Viana do Castelo	Operational
Ramal de Montemor	Torre da Gadanha–Montemor-o-Novo	1909	12.8 km (8.0 mi)	Iberian		Closed in 1989
Ramal do Montijo	Pinhal Novo–Montijo	1908	10.6 km (6.6 mi)	Iberian		Closed in 1989
Ramal de Mora	Évora–Mora	1907	60 km (37 mi)	Iberian		Closed in 1990
Ramal de Moura	Beja–Moura	1869–1902	58.8 km (36.5 mi)	Iberian		Closed in 1990
Ramal de Neves-Corvo	Ourique–Neves-Corvo mine	1930	30.8 km (19.1 mi)	Iberian		Operational
Ramal da Mina da Nogueirinha	Casa Branca–Nogueirinha mine		5.2 km (3.2 mi)	Iberian		Closed
Norte line	Lisboa-Santa Apolónia–Porto-São Bento	1856–1877	314 km (195 mi)	Iberian	25 kV AC	Operational
Oeste line	Agualva-Cacém–Figueira da Foz	1887–1888	215.1 km (133.7 mi)	Iberian	25 kV AC Agualva-Cacém–Mira Sintra-Meleças and Louriçal–Figueira da Foz	Operational
Ramal do Pego	Mouriscas-A–Pego Power Station	1992	6.7 km (4.2 mi)	Iberian	25 kV AC	Operational
Caminho de Ferro de Penafiel à Lixa e Entre-os-Rios	Entre-os-Rios–Lixa	1912	45.9 km (28.5 mi)	Metre		Closed in 1929
Ramal de Portalegre	Estremoz–Portalegre	1925–1949	63.1 km (39.2 mi)	Iberian		Closed in 1990
Ramal do Porto de Aveiro	Cacia–Port of Aveiro	2010	9 km (5.6 mi)	Iberian	25 kV AC	Operational
Linha do Porto à Póvoa e Famalicão	Porto-Trindade–Famalicão	1875–1881	57.1 km (35.5 mi)	Metre		Closed in 2001
Ramal de Reguengos	Évora–Reguengos de Monsaraz	1927	40.6 km (25.2 mi)	Iberian		Closed in 1988
Ramal de Rio Maior	Vale de Santarém–Espadanal mines	1945	30.4 km (18.9 mi)	Iberian		Closed in 1965
Sabor line	Pocinho–Duas Igrejas-Miranda	1911–1938	105 km (65 mi)	Metre		Closed in 1988
Ramal do Canal de São Roque	Aveiro–Canal de São Roque	1913	2.4 km (1.5 mi)	Iberian		Closed
Ramal do Seixal	Barreiro-A–Seixal	1923	4.4 km (2.7 mi)	Iberian		Closed in 1969
Ramal da Siderurgia Nacional	Coina–Siderurgia Nacional	2008	3.7 km (2.3 mi)	Iberian	25 kV AC	Operational
Sines line	Ermidas-Sado–Port of Sines	1927–1936	50 km (31 mi)	Iberian	25 kV AC	Operational
Ramal de Sines	Ortiga–Sines	1936	11.4 km (7.1 mi)	Iberian		Closed
Sintra line	Lisboa-Rossio–Sintra	1887–1891	27.2 km (16.9 mi)	Iberian	25 kV AC	Operational
Sul line	Campolide-A–Tunes	1912	273.6 km (170.0 mi)	Iberian	25 kV AC	Operational
Ramal de Tomar	Lamarosa–Tomar	1928	14.8 km (9.2 mi)	Iberian	25 kV AC	Operational
Tua line	Tua–Bragança	1887–1906	134 km (83 mi)	Metre		Closed in 2018
Tâmega line	Livração–Arco de Baúlhe	1909–1949	51.6 km (32.1 mi)	Metre		Closed in 2009
Ramal Internacional de Valença	Valença–Guillarei	1868		Iberian		Operational
Vendas Novas line	Setil–Vendas Novas	1904	69.6 km (43.2 mi)	Iberian	25 kV AC	Operational
Ramal de Viana-Doca	Viana do Castelo–Port of Viana do Castelo	1924	2.3 km (1.4 mi)	Iberian		Closed in 1988
Ramal de Vila Viçosa	Estremoz–Vila Viçosa	1905	16 km (9.9 mi)	Iberian		Closed
Vouga line	Espinho-Vouga–Sernada do Vouga	1908–1911	61 km (38 mi)	Metre		Operational

== Sources ==
- "2019 Network Statement" (PDF). 7 December 2018.
