= Linha da Matinha =

Portuguese railway line

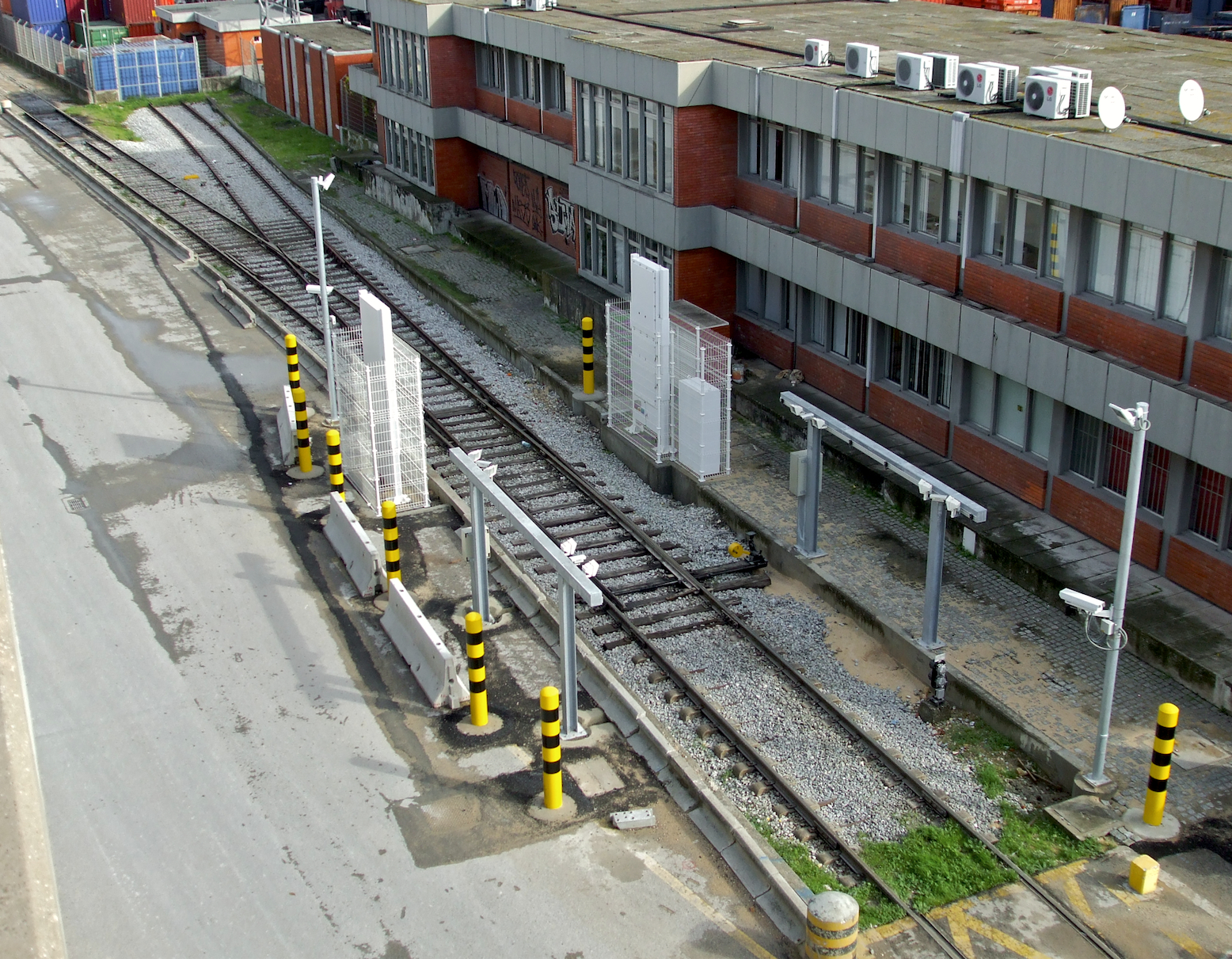
- X-ray inspection

Overview
- Status: Operational
- Termini: Lisboa-Santa Apolínia; Cais da Matinha

Technical
- Line length: 2.8 km (1.7 mi)
- Track gauge: 1,668 mm (5 ft 5 21/32 in) Iberian gauge

Location on the network
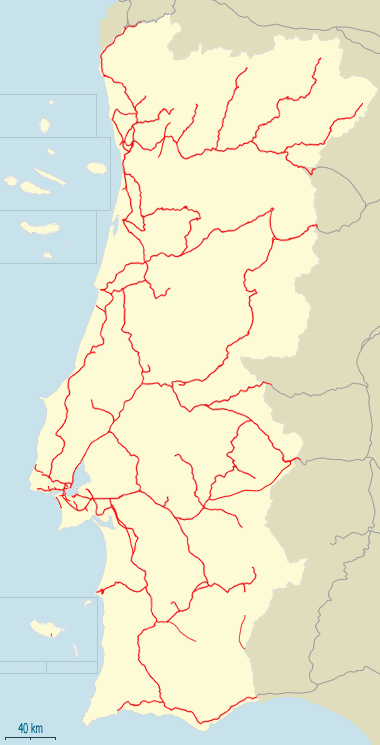

+ Sta Apolónia × Matinha (🔎)

Linha da Matinha is a freight railway line in Portugal which connects the railway station of Santa Apolónia, on the Linha do Norte, to the Port of Lisbon in Matinha.

The current alignment has been established since the late-1990s when the segment between Cais da Matinha and Sacavém via the former intermodal station at the Cabo Ruivo Seaplane Base was removed as part of the redevelopment of the Parque das Nações riverfront in preparation for Expo '98. The intermodal station at Cabo Ruivo Seaplane Base was until the latter's closure in the late-1950s used for the conveyance of cargo loaded and unloaded from seaplanes as well as serving as a major intercontinental passenger gateway and escape route for refugees fleeing the devastation of their homelands during World War II.

== See also ==
- List of railway lines in Portugal
- List of Portuguese locomotives and railcars
- History of rail transport in Portugal
