= Ramal de Neves-Corvo =

Portuguese railway line

Overview
- Termini: Ourique; Neves-Corvo mine

Technical
- Line length: 30.8 km (19.1 mi)
- Track gauge: 1,668 mm (5 ft 5 21/32 in) Iberian gauge
Route map
Location on the network

Ramal de Neves-Corvo is a railway branch in Portugal, which connects the station of Ourique, on the Linha do Alentejo, to the Neves-Corvo mine.

== See also ==
- List of railway lines in Portugal
- List of Portuguese locomotives and railcars
- History of rail transport in Portugal
