= Ramal de Portalegre =

Portuguese railway line

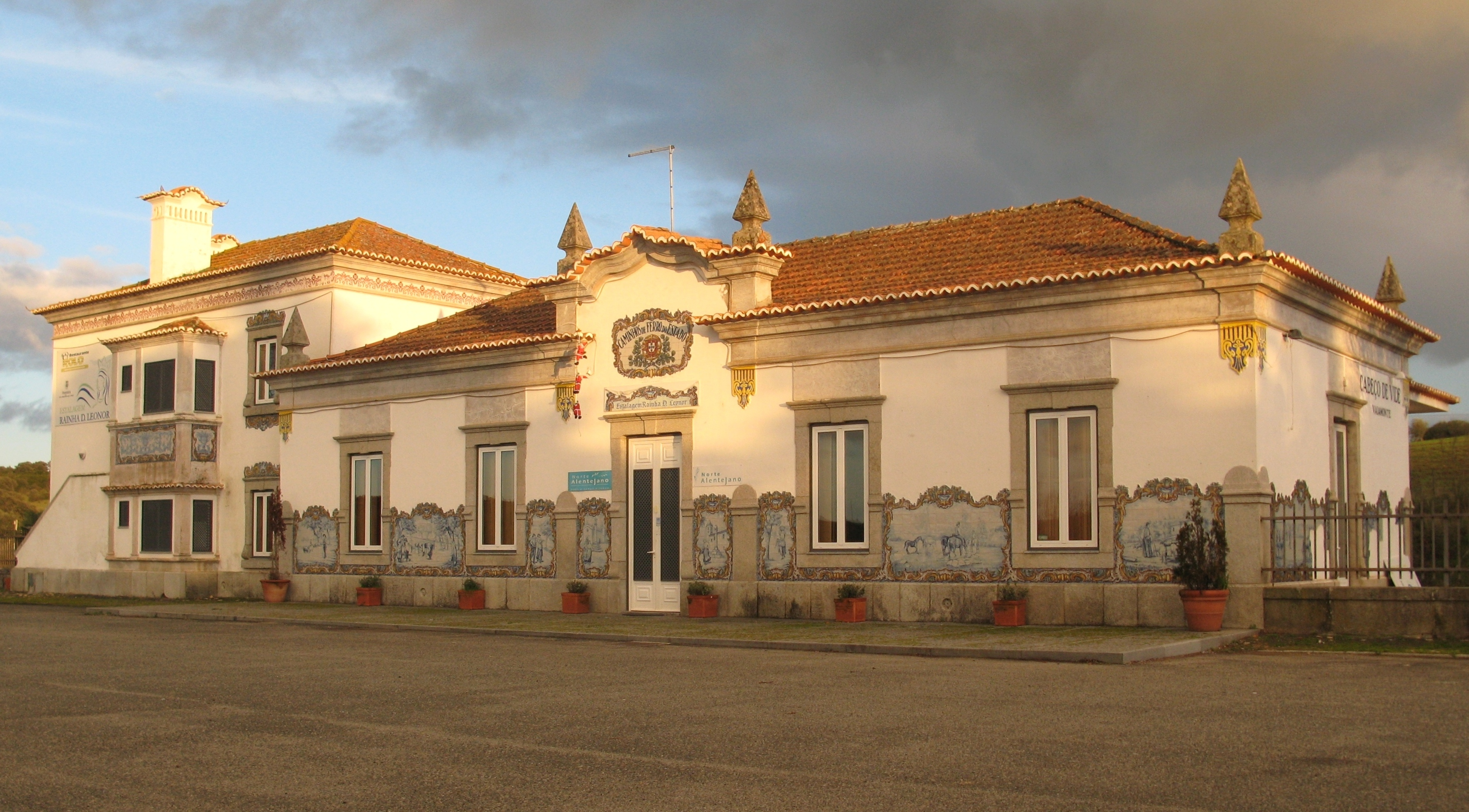
- Cabeço de Vide station

Overview
- Status: closed
- Termini: Estremoz; Portalegre

Technical
- Line length: 63.1 km (39.2 mi)
- Track gauge: 1,668 mm (5 ft 5 21/32 in) Iberian gauge
Route map
Location on the network

Ramal de Portalegre, originally called Linha de Portalegre, is a closed railway line which connected the stations of Estremoz, on the Linha de Évora, and Portalegre, on the Linha do Leste. It was planned to connect Estremoz to Castelo de Vide, on the Ramal de Cáceres, but the railway was only built to Portalegre-Gare. The line was opened on 21 January 1949, and closed in 1990.

== See also ==
- List of railway lines in Portugal
- History of rail transport in Portugal
