= Ramal de Maceira-Liz =

Portuguese railway line

Overview
- Status: Operational
- Termini: Martingança; Maceira-Liz

Technical
- Line length: 5 km (3.1 mi)
- Track gauge: 1,668 mm (5 ft 5 21/32 in) Iberian gauge

Location on the network
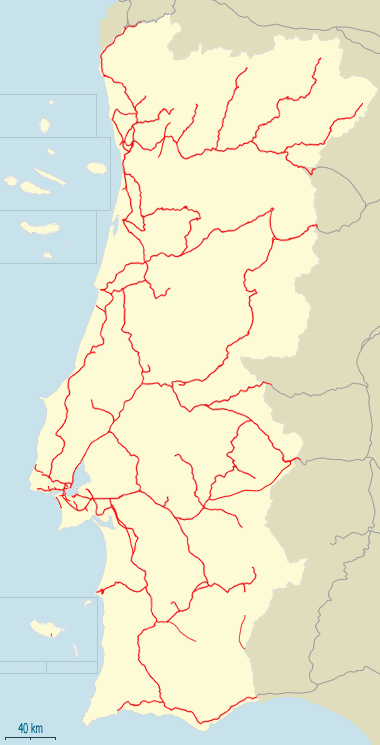

+ Martingança × Maceira-Liz (🔎)

Ramal de Maceira-Liz is a freight railway line in Portugal which connects the railway station of Martingança, on the Linha do Oeste, to the cement factory Maceira-Liz.

== See also ==
- List of railway lines in Portugal
- List of Portuguese locomotives and railcars
- History of rail transport in Portugal
