= Ramal de Aljustrel =

Railway line in Portugal

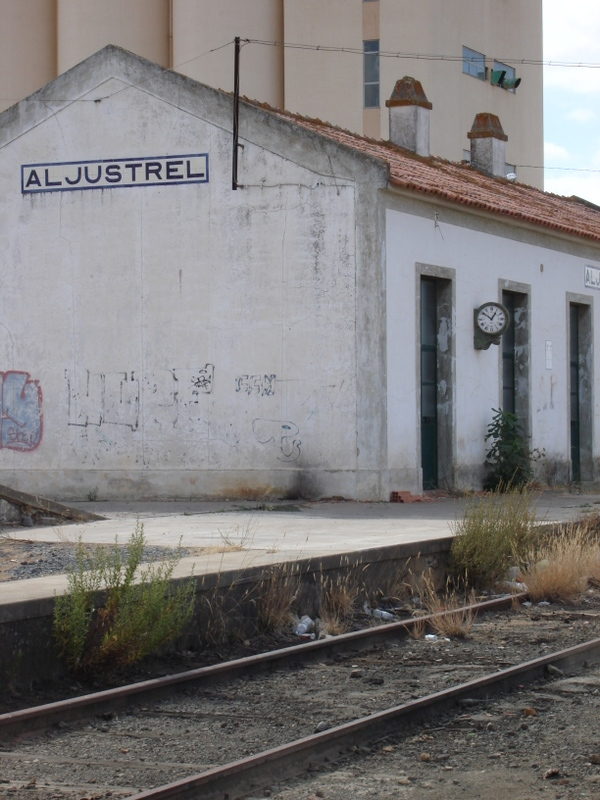

Overview
- Termini: Castro Verde-Almodôvar; Aljustrel

Technical
- Line length: 11.6 km (7.2 mi)
- Track gauge: 1,668 mm (5 ft 5 21/32 in) Iberian gauge
Route map
Location on the network

Ramal de Aljustrel is a closed railway line which connected the stations of Castro Verde-Almodôvar, on the Linha do Alentejo, to Aljustrel, in Portugal. It was opened on 2 June 1929 and closed around 1993.

== See also ==
- List of railway lines in Portugal
- List of Portuguese locomotives and railcars
- History of rail transport in Portugal
