= Ramal da Mina da Nogueirinha =

Portuguese railway line

Overview
- Status: Closed
- Termini: Casa Branca; Nogueirinha mine

Technical
- Line length: 5.2 km (3.2 mi)
- Track gauge: 1,668 mm (5 ft 5 21/32 in) Iberian gauge
Route map
Location on the network

Ramal da Mina da Nogueirinha is a closed railway branch in Portugal, which connected the station of Casa Branca, on the current Linha do Alentejo, to the Nogueirinha mine.

== See also ==
- List of railway lines in Portugal
- History of rail transport in Portugal
