= Ramal de Viana-Doca =

Portuguese railway line

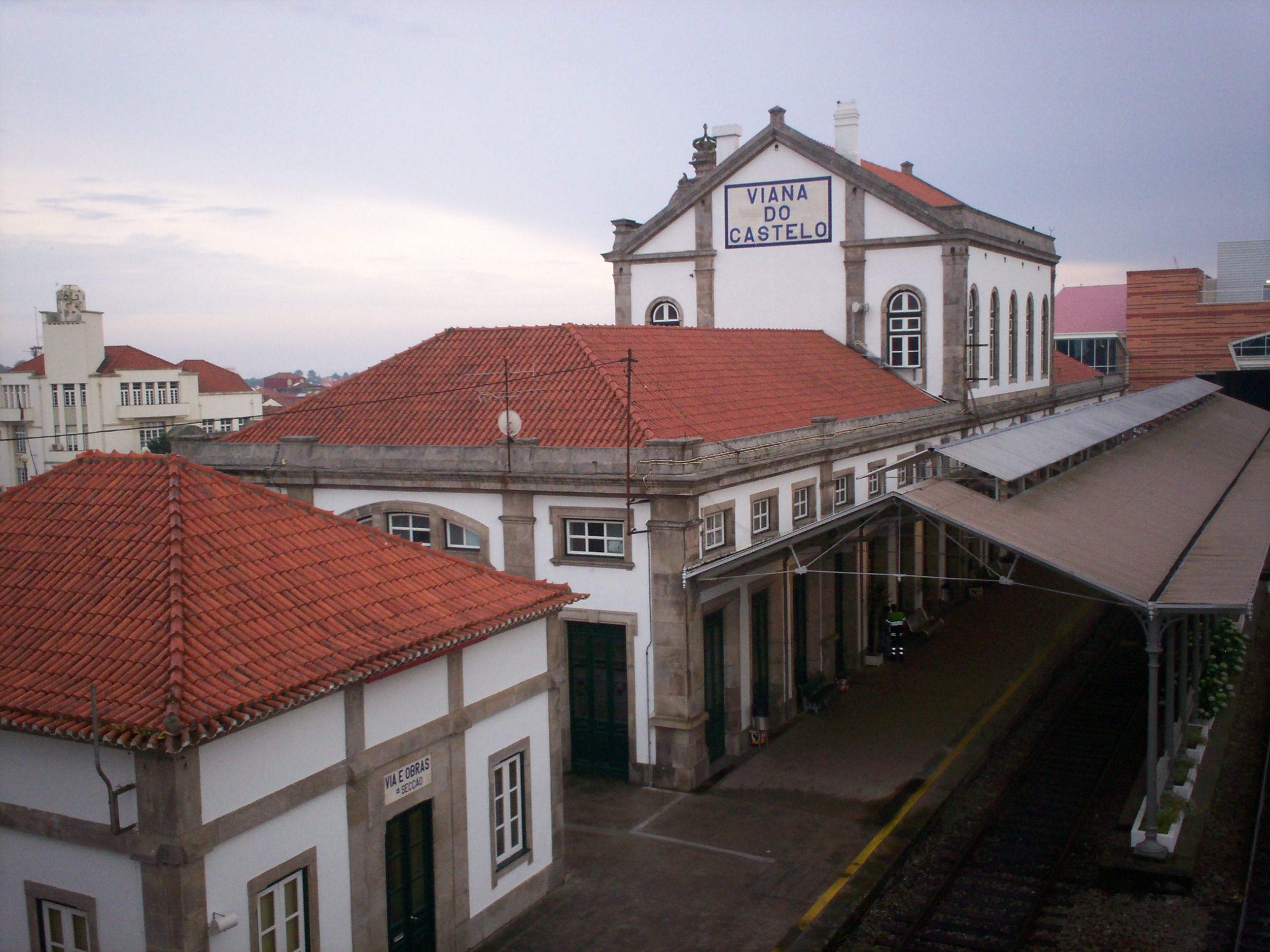
- Viana do Castelo railway station

Overview
- Status: Closed
- Termini: Setil; Port of Viana do Castelo

Technical
- Line length: 2.3 km (1.4 mi)
- Track gauge: 1,668 mm (5 ft 5 21/32 in) Iberian gauge
Route map
Location on the network

Ramal de Viana-Doca is a closed Portuguese railway branch line which connected the station of Viana do Castelo to the city's port. It was opened on 20 March 1924 and closed in mid-1988.

== See also ==
- List of railway lines in Portugal
- History of rail transport in Portugal
