= Linha de Vendas Novas =

Portuguese railway line

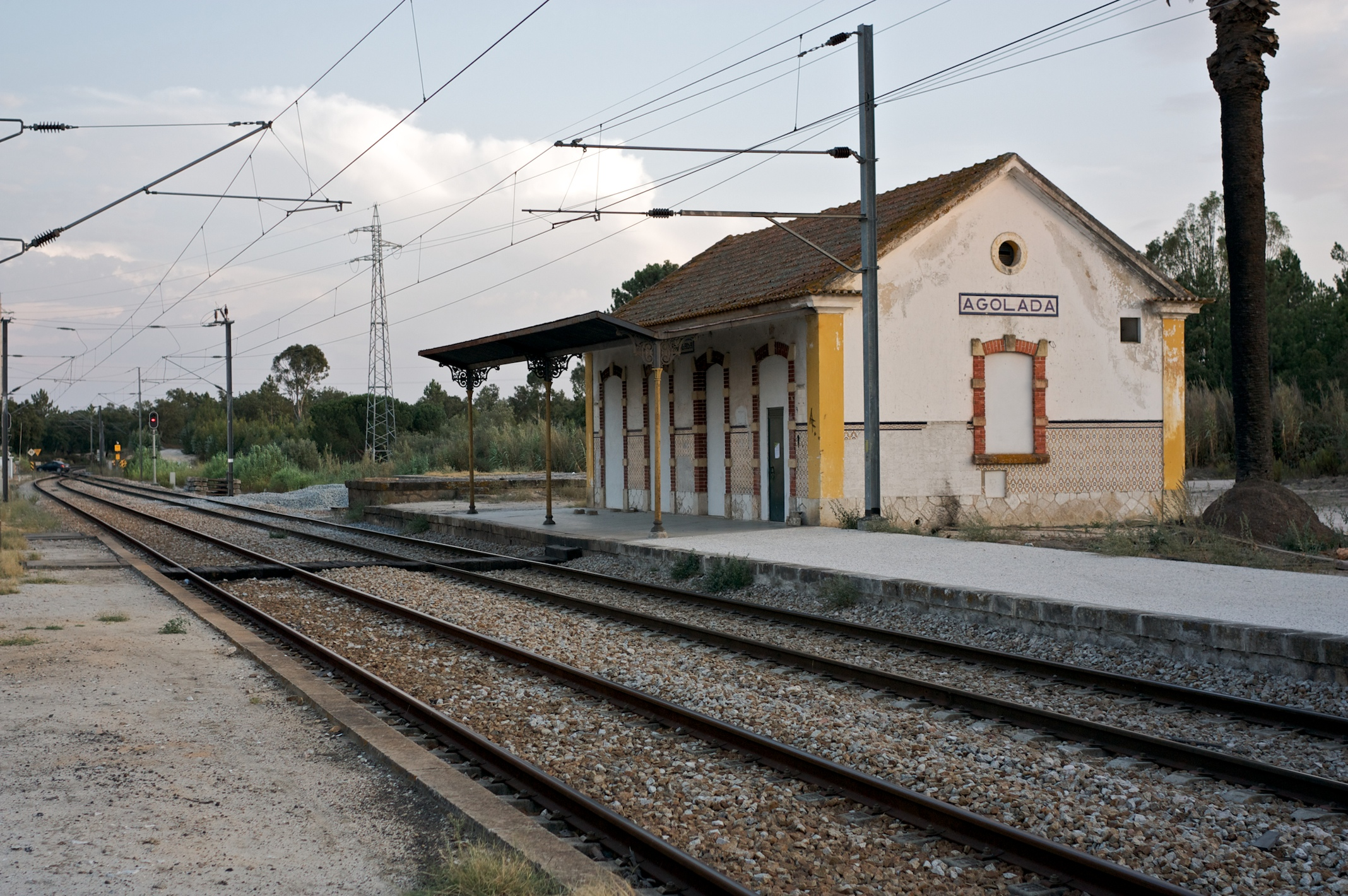
- Agolada railway station

Overview
- Status: Operational
- Termini: Setil; Vendas Novas

Technical
- Line length: 69.6 km (43.2 mi)
- Track gauge: 1,668 mm (5 ft 5 21/32 in) Iberian gauge
Route map
Location on the network

Linha de Vendas Novas is a freight railway line which connects the stations of Setil, on the Linha do Norte, and Vendas Novas, on the Linha do Alentejo, in Portugal. It was opened on 15 January 1904. This line also previously had a regional passenger service which operated until 2005, then again between 2009 and 2011. Passenger service on this line was discontinued due to low ridership.

== See also ==
- List of railway lines in Portugal
- History of rail transport in Portugal
