= Ramal do Montijo =

Railway line in Portugal

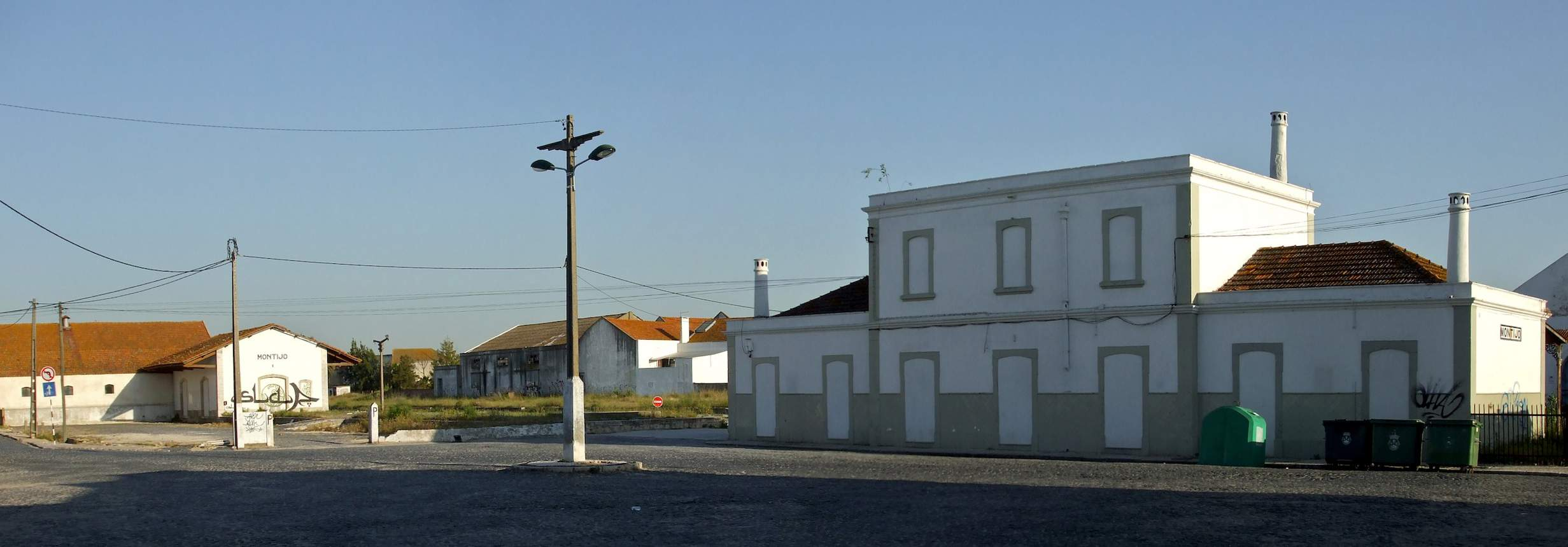
- Montijo railway station in 2009.

Overview
- Status: Closed
- Termini: Pinhal Novo; Montijo

Technical
- Line length: 10.6 km (6.6 mi)
- Track gauge: 1,668 mm (5 ft 5 21/32 in) Iberian gauge

Location on the network
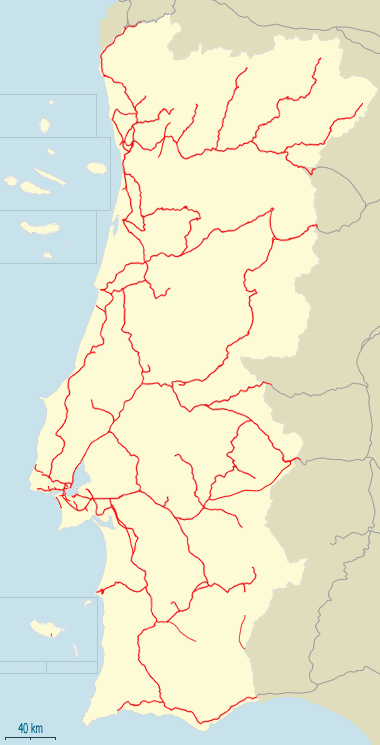

+ Porto-S. B. × Monção (🔎)

Ramal do Montijo, originally called Ramal de Aldegallega or Ramal de Aldeia Galega, the former name of Montijo, is a closed railway line which connected Pinhal Novo to Montijo, in Portugal. It was opened on 4 October 1908 and closed in 1989.

== See also ==
- List of railway lines in Portugal
- List of Portuguese locomotives and railcars
- History of rail transport in Portugal
