= Ramal da Base Aérea da Maceda =

Portuguese railway line

Overview
- Status: Closed
- Termini: Carvalheira-Maceda; Aeródromo Militar de Ovar

Technical
- Line length: 0.59 km (0.37 mi)
- Track gauge: 1,668 mm (5 ft 5 21/32 in) Iberian gauge
- Electrification: 25 kV / 50 kHz Overhead line
Route map
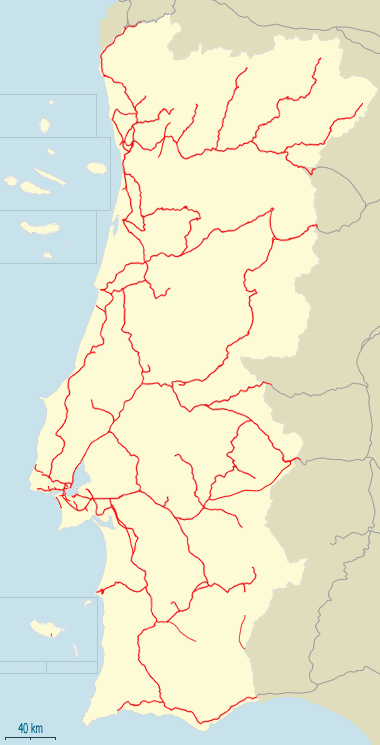
+ Cortegaça × Airbase (🔎)
Location on the network

Ramal da Base Aérea da Maceda is a closed railway line in Portugal which connected the railway halt of Carvalheira-Maceda, on the Linha do Norte, to the Ovar military airbase. By 2010, the tracks had been removed, with only the overhead pillars remaining.

== See also ==
- List of railway lines in Portugal
- List of Portuguese locomotives and railcars
- History of rail transport in Portugal
