= Ramal do Canal de São Roque =

Portuguese railway line

Overview
- Status: closed
- Termini: Aveiro; Canal de São Roque

Technical
- Line length: 30.4 km (18.9 mi)
- Track gauge: 1,668 mm (5 ft 5 21/32 in) Iberian gauge
Route map
Location on the network

Ramal de São Roque was a Portuguese branch line which connected the station of Aveiro, on the Linha do Norte, to the Canal de São Roque.

== See also ==
- List of railway lines in Portugal
- History of rail transport in Portugal
