= Ramal de Moura =

Portuguese railway line

Ramal de Mora
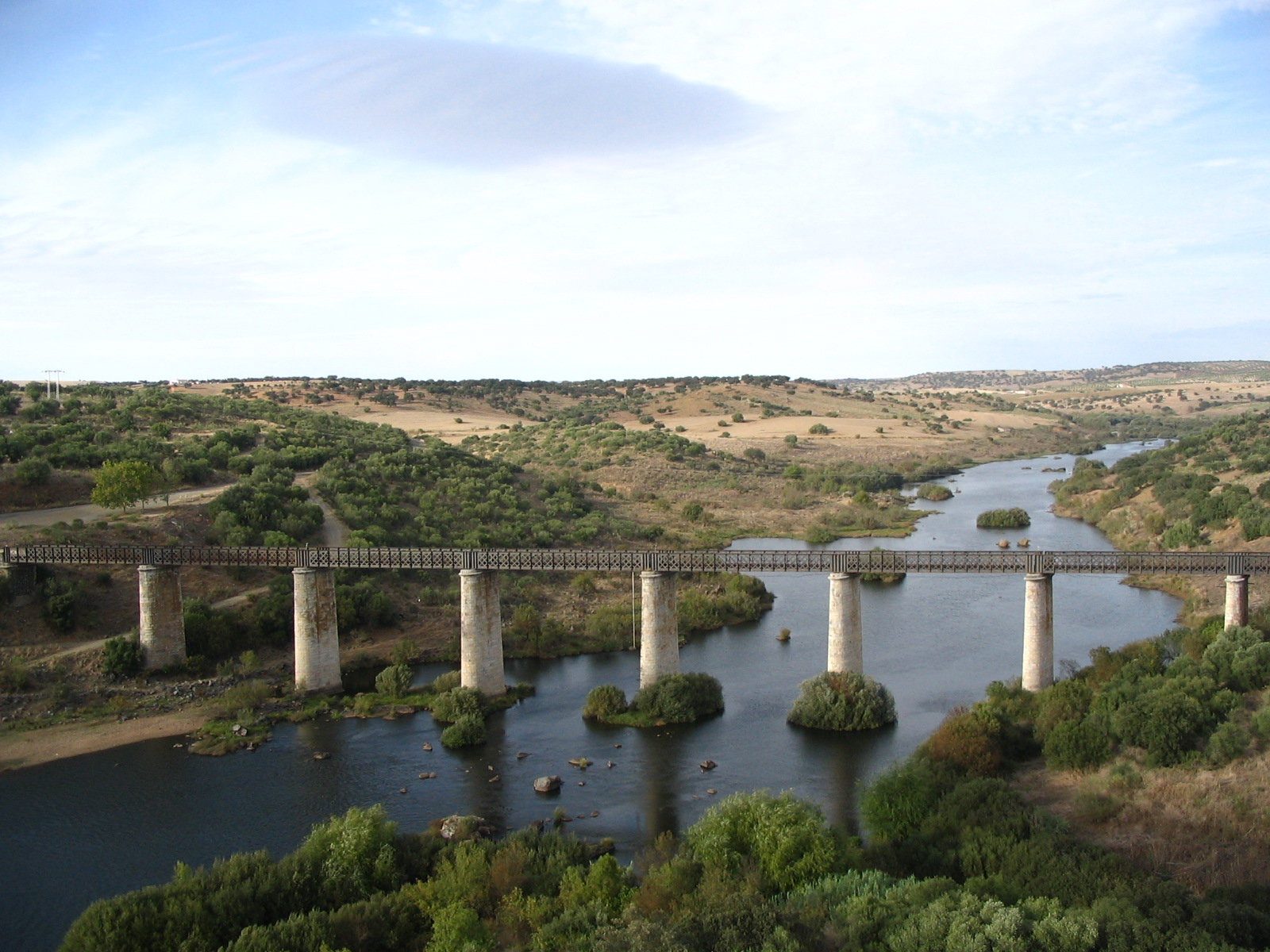
- Guadiana Bridge.

Overview
- Termini: Évora; Mora

Technical
- Line length: 58.8 km (36.5 mi)
- Track gauge: 1,668 mm (5 ft 5 21/32 in) Iberian gauge
Route map
Location on the network

Ramal de Moura is a closed railway branch in Portugal, which connected the stations of Beja, on the Linha do Alentejo, and Moura. The sections from Beja to Quintos, Serpa, Pias, and Moura were opened on 2 November 1869, 14 April 1878, 14 February 1887, and 27 December 1902, respectively. The line was closed in 1990.

== See also ==
- List of railway lines in Portugal
- List of Portuguese locomotives and railcars
- History of rail transport in Portugal
