= Ramal de Aveiro-Mar =

Railway line in Portugal

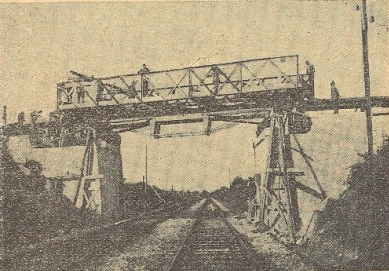
- The bridge over Linha do Norte under construction.

Overview
- Status: Closed
- Termini: Aveiro; Canal do Cojo

Technical
- Line length: 0.9 km (0.56 mi)
- Track gauge: Metre

Location on the network
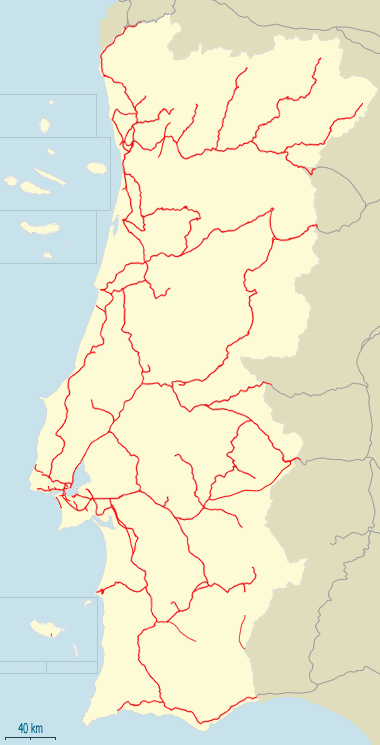

+ Aveiro × Canal (🔎)

Ramal de Aveiro-Mar was a Portuguese railway line, in Aveiro. It connected the metre-gauge Ramal de Aveiro, at Aveiro railway station, to the Canal do Cojo dock, and was used to transport fish to the local market.

It had a bridge over the Linha do Norte, and an underpass towards the end of the line.

== See also ==
- List of railway lines in Portugal
- List of Portuguese locomotives and railcars
- History of rail transport in Portugal
