= Ramal de Braga =

Railway line in Portugal

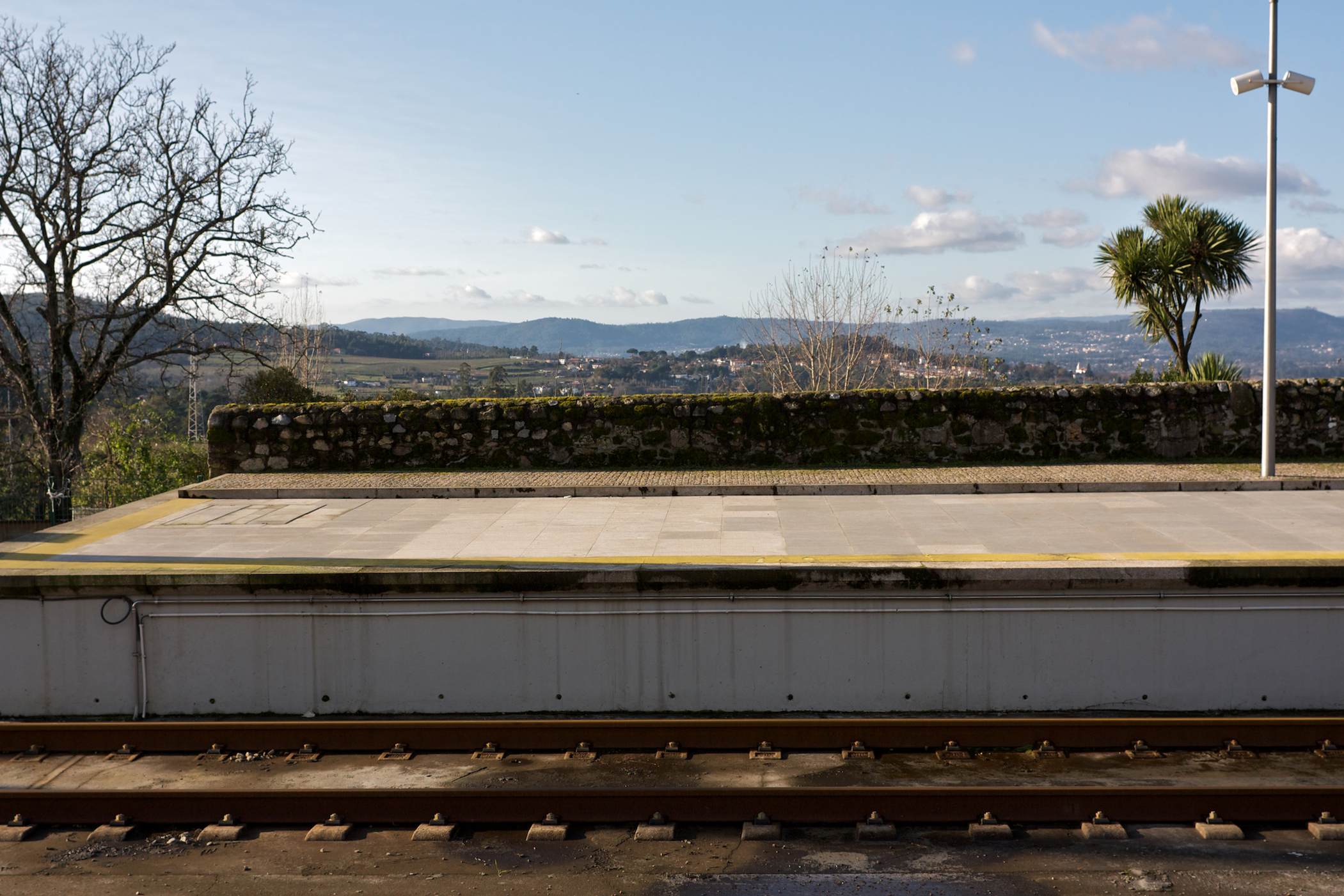
- View from Braga railway station.

Overview
- Status: Operational
- Owner: Infraestruturas de Portugal
- Termini: Nine; Braga

Technical
- Line length: 15 km (9.3 mi)
- Track gauge: Iberian
- Electrification: 25 kV / 50 kHz Overhead line
Route map
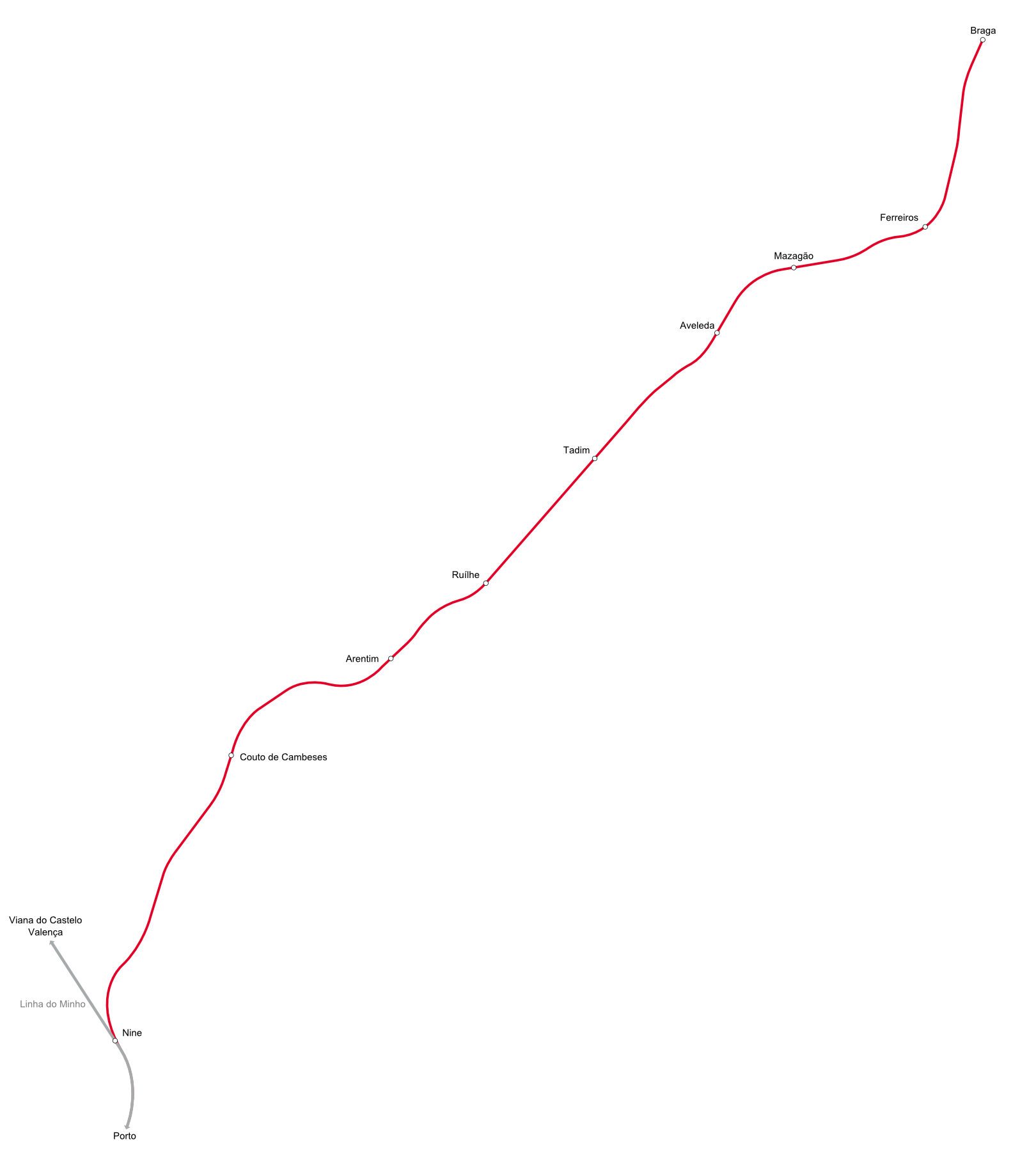

Location on the network
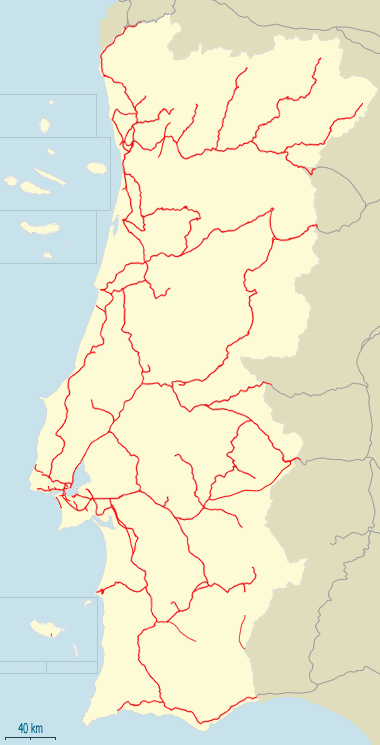

+ Nine × Braga (🔎)

Ramal de Braga is a branch line in Portugal, which connects Nine railway station on the Linha do Minho, with Braga. It was opened on 21 May 1875. and modernised in 2004.

== See also ==
- List of railway lines in Portugal
- List of Portuguese locomotives and railcars
- History of rail transport in Portugal

== Sources ==
- Martins, João; Brion, Madalena; Sousa, Miguel (1996). O Caminho de Ferro Revisitado (in Portuguese). Lisbon: Caminhos de Ferro Portugueses.
- Reis, Francisco; Gomes, Rosa; Gomes, Gilberto (2006). Os Caminhos de Ferro Portugueses 1856-2006 (in Portuguese). Lisbon: CP - Comboios de Portugal e Público-Comunicação Social S. A. ISBN 989-619-078-X.
- "2019 Network Statement" (PDF). 7 December 2018.
