= Ramal da Alfândega =

Railway line in Portugal

Overview
- Termini: Porto-Campanhã; Porto-Alfândega

Technical
- Line length: 3.89 km (2.42 mi)
- Track gauge: 1,668 mm (5 ft 5 21/32 in) Iberian gauge
Route map
Location on the network
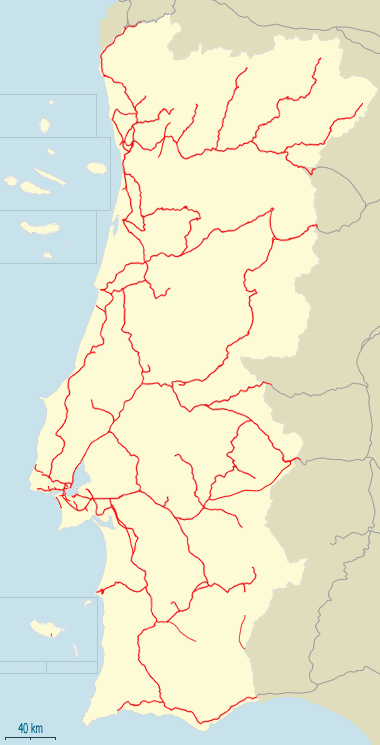
+ Porto-Campanhã × Porto-Alfândega (🔎)

Ramal da Alfândega was an Iberian gauge railway line which connected Porto-Campanhã railway station to Porto-Alfândega railway station, in Porto, Portugal. It was opened in 1888 and closed in 1989. The Ramal da Alfândega has been inactive for about thirty years. In 2021, members of the Municipal Assembly visited the site to evaluate its potential for two possible permanent solutions. One option is to create an eco-track, featuring a pedestrian and bike path for weekend use. The other option is to establish a fast commuter transport link between Campanhã and Customs, utilizing an electric transportation system on weekdays.

== See also ==
- List of railway lines in Portugal
- List of Portuguese locomotives and railcars
- History of rail transport in Portugal
