= Ramal do Estádio Nacional =

Railway line in Portugal

Overview
- Status: Closed
- Termini: Cruz Quebrada; Estação Ferroviária do Estádio Nacional

Service
- Operator(s): Caminhos de Ferro Portugueses

History
- Opened: 16 June 1944
- Closed: 1 November 1979 (final service)

Technical
- Track gauge: 1,668 mm (5 ft 5 21/32 in) Iberian gauge
- Electrification: 1500 V DC Overhead line

Location on the network
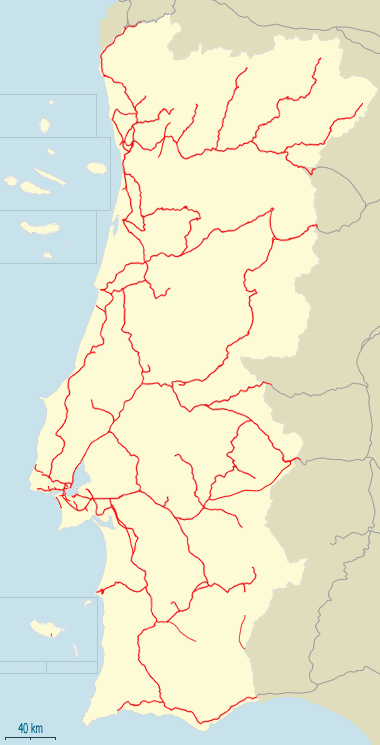

+ C. Quebrada × Estádio (🔎)

Ramal do Estádio Nacional was a Portuguese railway branch line which connected Cruz Quebrada railway station, on the Linha de Cascais, to the Estádio Nacional. The terminus was located where the Jamor Olympic Swimming Complex is today.

It was opened on 16 June 1944, six days after the stadium was inaugurated, and was only operated during sporting events, with trains running from Cais do Sodré and back.

This branch was closed in the early-1980s due to the increased costs of maintaining the line when not in use as well as the increase in the use of buses and motor vehicles; the last service was probably operated on 1 November 1979, for the Portugal-Norway game. The line was handed over from Caminhos de Ferro Portugueses to the stadium management on 1 April 1985, and parts of the line were later subsequently redeveloped.

The Lisbon Carris tram service also formerly had a tram station and reversing loop just beside the Estação Ferroviária do Estádio Nacional, which until its closure served as the western terminus of line 15.

== See also ==
- List of railway lines in Portugal
- List of Portuguese locomotives and railcars
- History of rail transport in Portugal
