= Ramal de Montemor =

Railway line in Portugal

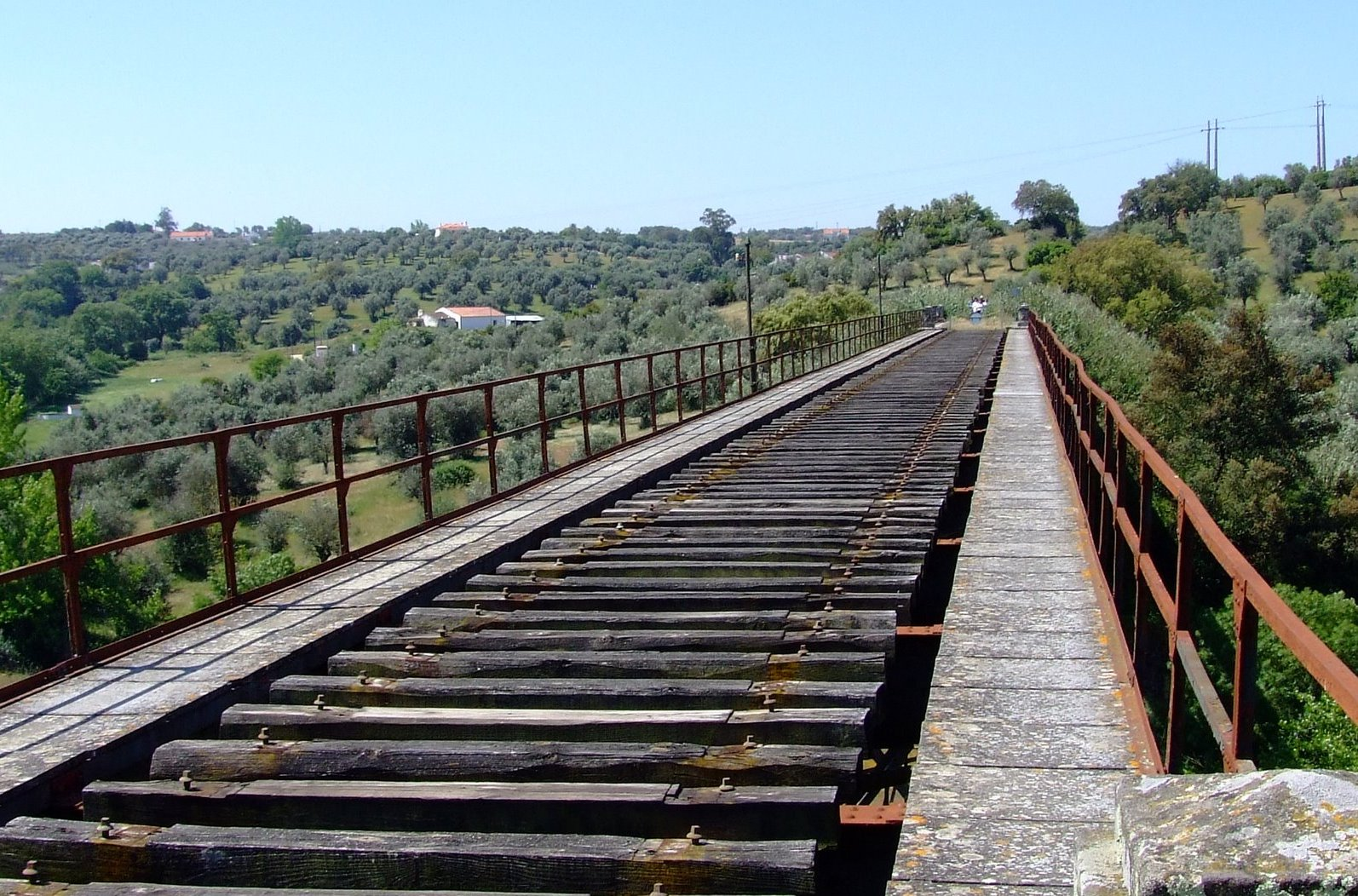
- Almansor Bridge.

Overview
- Status: Closed
- Termini: Torre da Gadanha; Montemor-o-Novo

Technical
- Line length: 12.8 km (8.0 mi)
- Track gauge: 1,668 mm (5 ft 5 21/32 in) Iberian gauge

Location on the network
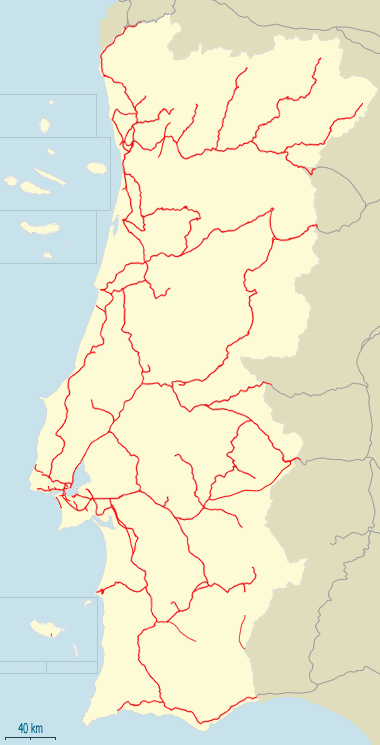

+ T. Gadanha × Mm.-o-N. (🔎)

Ramal de Montemor is a closed railway line which connected the stations of Torre da Gadanha and Montemor-o-Novo, in Portugal. It was opened on 2 September 1909, and closed in 1989.

== See also ==
- List of railway lines in Portugal
- List of Portuguese locomotives and railcars
- History of rail transport in Portugal
