= Ramal da Siderurgia Nacional =

Portuguese railway line

Overview
- Status: Operational
- Termini: Coina; Siderurgia Nacional

Technical
- Line length: 3.7 km (2.3 mi)
- Track gauge: 1,668 mm (5 ft 5 21/32 in) Iberian gauge
Route map
Location on the network

Ramal da Siderurgia Nacional is a Portuguese freight railway line which connects the station of Coina to the industrial complex of Siderurgia Nacional. The line opened in March 2008.

== See also ==
- List of railway lines in Portugal
- History of rail transport in Portugal
