= Ramal de Cáceres =

Railway line in Portugal

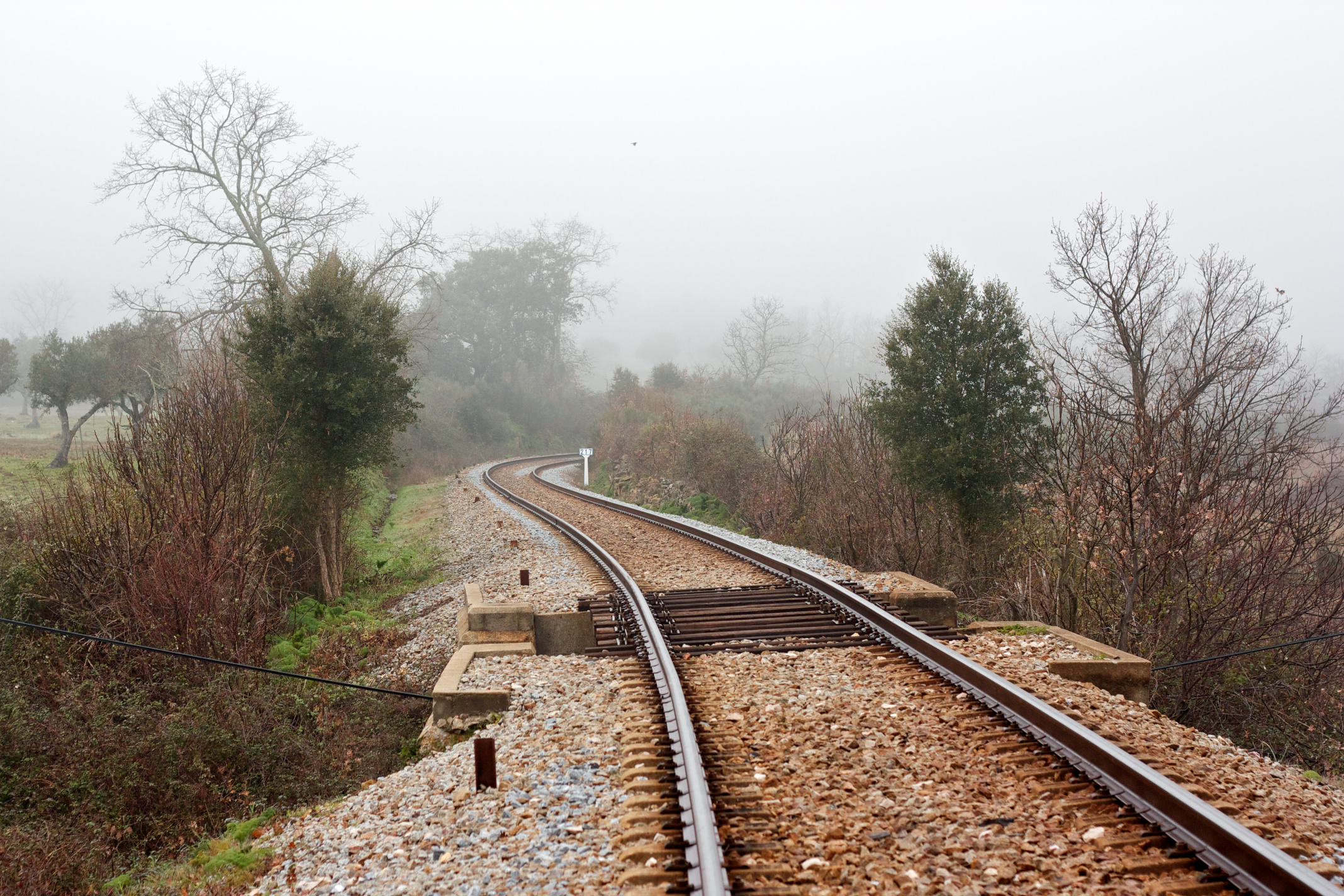
- Ramal de Cáceres near to Castelo de Vide railway station.

Overview
- Status: Closed
- Owner: Infraestruturas de Portugal
- Termini: Torre das Vargens; Marvão-Beirã

Technical
- Line length: 72.4 km (45.0 mi)
- Track gauge: Iberian

Location on the network
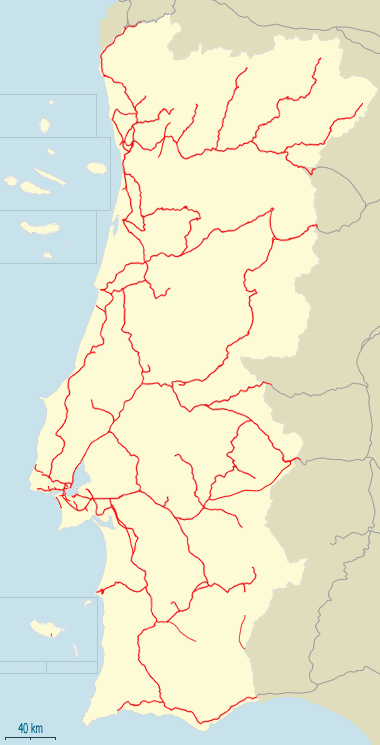

+ Torre V. × M.-B. (🔎)

Ramal de Cáceres is a closed Portuguese railway line which connected Torre das Vargens railway station, on the Linha do Leste, and Marvão-Beirã railway station, near to the border with Spain. It was completed on 15 October 1879, but was only opened on 6 June 1880. From 1881, the line was used as a faster alternative for international travelers between Portugal and Spain compared to the Linha do Leste, due to a better connection to the Spanish network. It was closed by REFER on 15 August 2012.

== See also ==
- List of railway lines in Portugal
- List of Portuguese locomotives and railcars
- History of rail transport in Portugal
