= Ramal de Vila Viçosa =

Railway line in Portugal

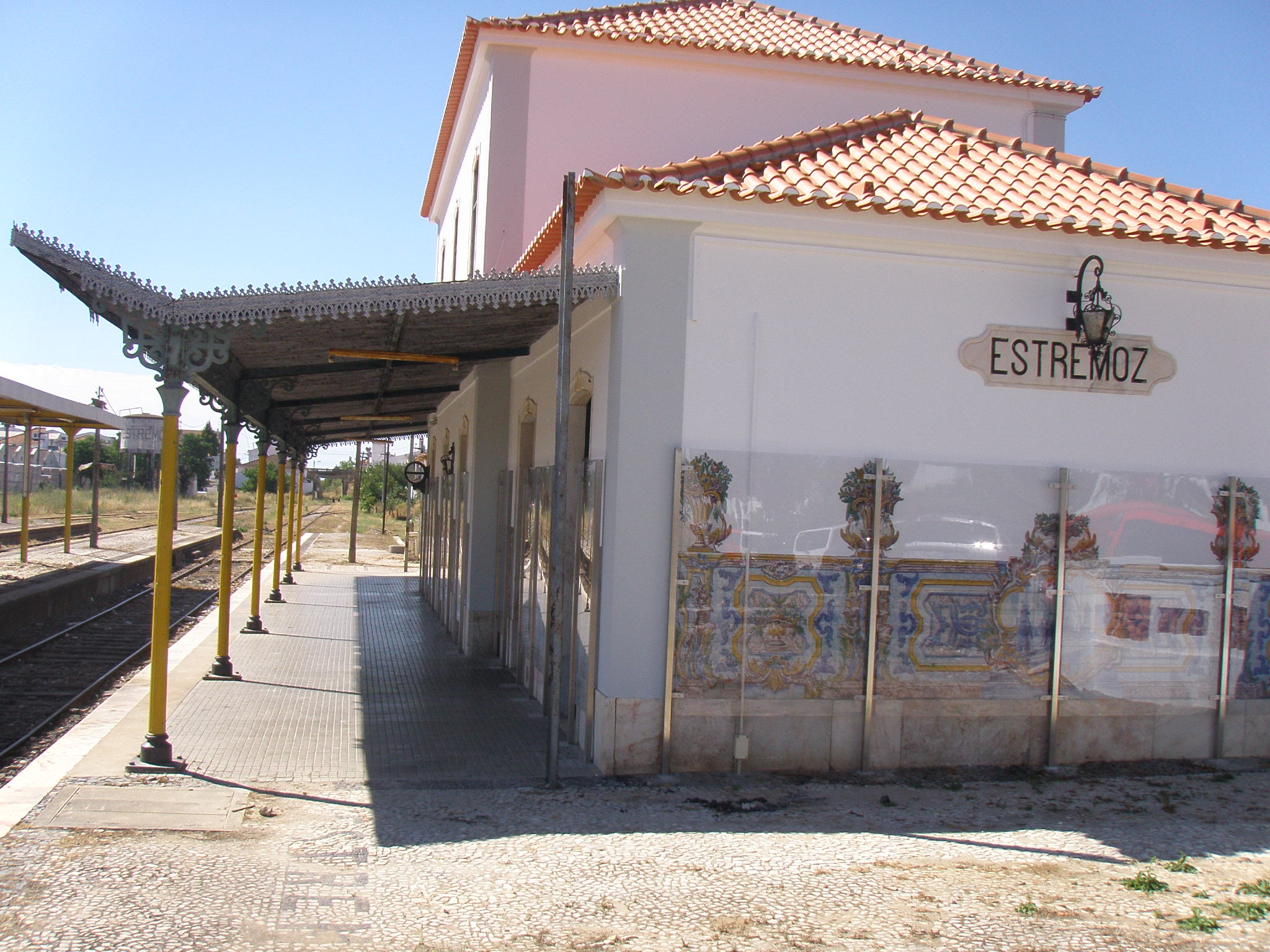
- Estremoz railway station

Overview
- Status: Closed
- Termini: Estremoz; Vila Viçosa

Technical
- Line length: 16 km (9.9 mi)
- Track gauge: 1,668 mm (5 ft 5 21/32 in) Iberian gauge
Route map
Location on the network

Ramal de Vila Viçosa is a closed railway line which connected the stations of Estremoz and Vila Viçosa, in Portugal. It was opened in 1905, and closed in 1990.

== See also ==
- List of railway lines in Portugal
- List of Portuguese locomotives and railcars
- History of rail transport in Portugal
