= Ramal do Porto de Aveiro =

Portuguese railway line

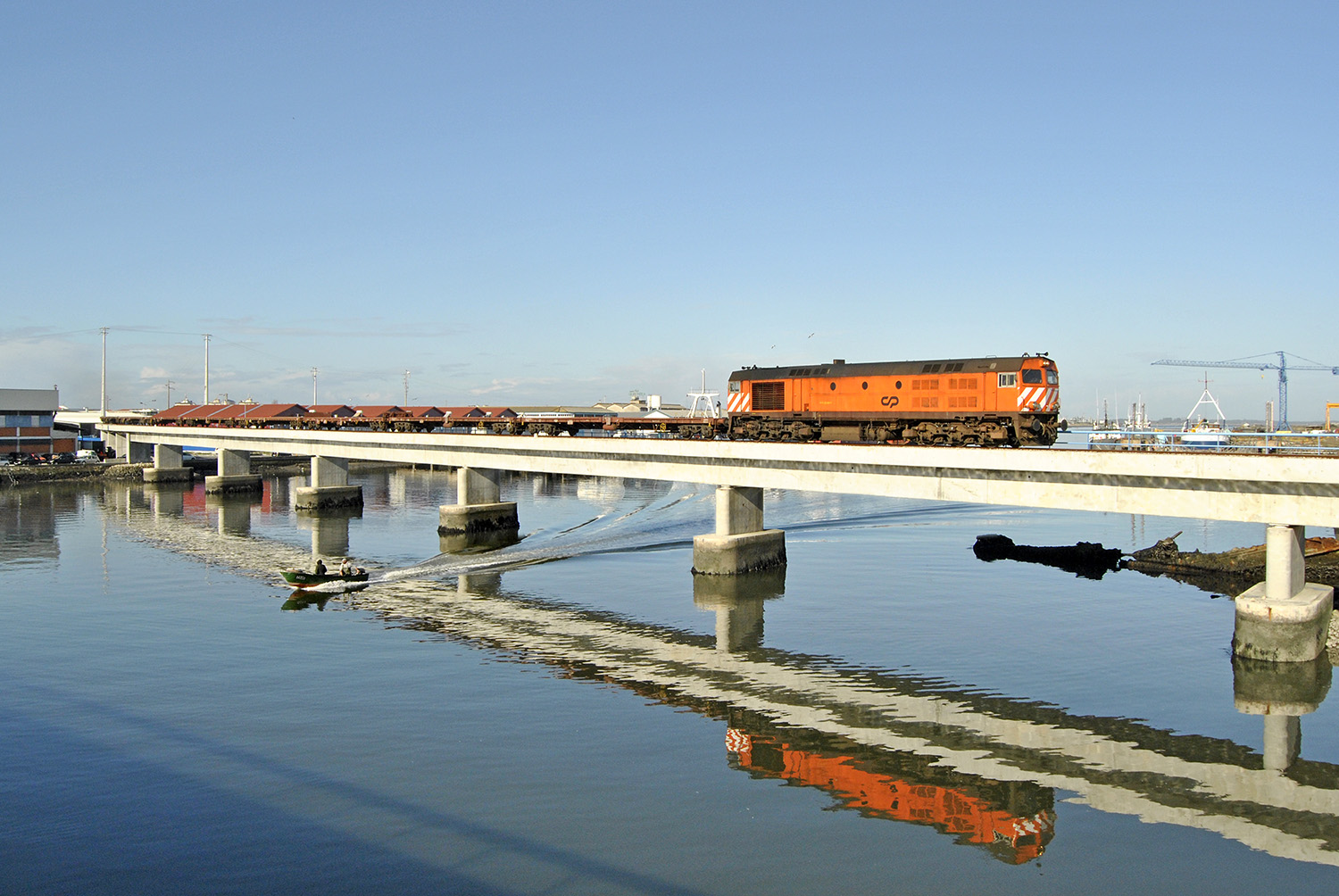
- Train on the Gafanha Bridge

Overview
- Status: Operational
- Termini: Cacia; Port of Aveiro

Technical
- Line length: 9 km (5.6 mi)
- Track gauge: 1,668 mm (5 ft 5 21/32 in) Iberian gauge
- Electrification: 25 kV / 50 kHz Overhead line
Route map
Location on the network

Ramal do Porto de Aveiro is a railway branch in Portugal which connects the cargo terminal of Cacia to the Port of Aveiro. It was opened in March 2010.

== See also ==
- List of railway lines in Portugal
- History of rail transport in Portugal
