= António Cardoso Avelino =

Portuguese politician (1822–1889)

- Antonio Cardozo Avellino
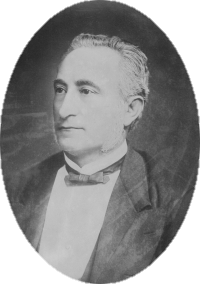
- Minister and Secretary of State for Public Works, Commerce and Industry: 13 September 1871 – 9 November 1876
- Minister and Secretary of State for Finance (acting): 15 January 1872 – 28 January 1872
- Minister and State Secretary for Ecclesiastical Affairs and Justice: 9 November 1876 – 5 March 1877

Personal details
- Born: 1822 Lamego, Kingdom of Portugal
- Died: 6 December 1889 (aged 66–67)
- Party: Progressive Party

António Cardoso Avelino (1822 – 6 December 1889) was a Portuguese jurist and politician.

== Biography ==
=== Birth ===
He was born as Antonio Cardozo Avellino in 1822, in the city of Lamego, Kingdom of Portugal.

=== Political career ===
In 1863, António Cardoso Avelino was deputy to the crown prosecutor at the Ministry of Public Works, and issued a report on a request from British businessman George Croft for the ownership of the mines he owned in the Leiria District to be passed on to a British company. This opinion was one of the main legal bases for the use of foreign capital in Portugal, which gave a major boost to the economic process of regeneration.

António Cardoso Avelino served as Minister of Public Works under the presidency of Fontes Pereira de Melo, having been harshly criticised in political circles for his concession for the Tejo - Oceano - Sado line. It was also during his mandate that several proposals were made for railways, including a transversal railway from Ponte de Santana to São Martinho do Porto via Cartaxo, Rio Maior, Óbidos and Caldas da Rainha, and another from Vila Real to Viseu via Régua and then to Lamego, presented by German businessman Maximiliano Schreck.

He then moved to the Justice portfolio as an interim, although by then he was already considered a spent politician, so he left public administration after the end of his term. He was then promoted from assistant to the Attorney General of the Crown to Attorney General, and seconded as administrator of the House of Braganza. Despite his withdrawal from the government, he continued to have an indirect influence on state affairs through his consultative voting rights.

=== Personal life ===
António Cardoso Avelino was always interested in music and made a name for himself as a pianist.

He married a daughter of Councillor Paiva Pereira, and had a daughter.

== Death ==
In his final years, António Cardoso Avelino suffered from an aortic lesion, which was later accentuated by pneumonia, and he died on 6 December 1889.

== Bibliography ==
- SERRÃO, Joaquim Veríssimo (1986). História de Portugal: O Terceiro Liberalismo (1851–1890). Lisboa: Verbo. p. 423.
- BRANDÃO, José Manuel; NUNES, Maria de Fátima, eds. (2015). Memórias do carvão (PDF). Batalha e Porto de Mós: Câmara Municipal da Batalha, Câmara Municipal de Porto de Mós e Instituto de História Contemporânea da Universidade de Évora. p. 375. ISBN 978-989-8210-23-4 – via Serviços de Ciência e Cooperação – Universidade de Évora.
