= Ramal de Tomar =

Portuguese railway line

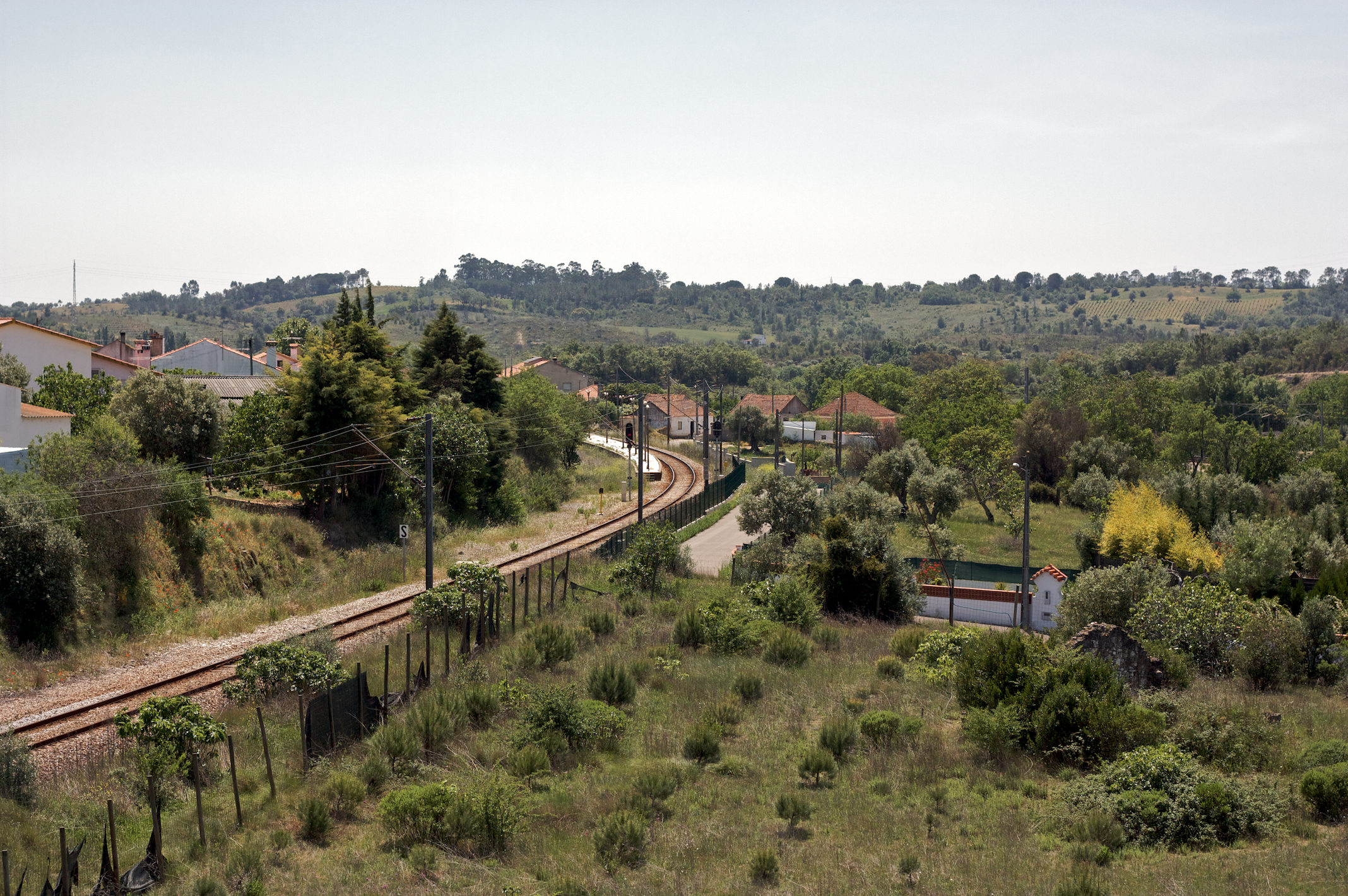
- Track near Lamarosa

Overview
- Status: Operational
- Termini: Lamarosa; Tomar

Technical
- Line length: 14.8 km (9.2 mi)
- Number of tracks: Single-track
- Track gauge: 1,668 mm (5 ft 5 21/32 in) Iberian gauge
- Electrification: 25 kV 50 Hz catenary
- Train protection system: CONVEL
Route map
Location on the network

Ramal de Tomar is a Portuguese railway line which connects the stations of Lamarosa, on the Linha do Norte, and Tomar. It was opened on 24 September 1928.

== See also ==
- List of railway lines in Portugal
- History of rail transport in Portugal
