= Pedro Queiroz Pereira =

Portuguese businessperson and competition driver (1949 - 2018)

Pedro Mendonça de Queiroz Pereira (5 March 1949 – 18 August 2018) was a Portuguese businessman and former competition driver.

Born in Lisbon, he attended the Colégio Militar and the Higher Institute of Accounting and Administration of Lisbon, but left his studies to devote himself to business. Lived in Brazil between 1975 and 1987, where the family moved during the Processo Revolucionário Em Curso. In that country he was also practicing motor sports, namely Formula Two, competing with the famous Ayrton Senna.

He has held positions in several companies controlled by the Queiroz Pereira family, with interests in the real estate, hotel, agriculture, renewable energy, automobile, and cement and pre-fabricated industries. He was a member of the Board of Directors of Hotel Ritz and Banco Espírito Santo. In 1995, he expanded the interests of the Queiroz Pereira family to the cement industry, with the acquisition of Secil and, later, the paper industry, with the acquisition of 30% of Portucel, companies where it served as chairman of the Board of Directors, accumulating with the chairman of the board of directors and the executive committee of Semapa.

On 6 November 2009, he was awarded by the Grand Cross of the Order of Business Merit- Industrial Merit Class.

In 2015 it was announced that the executive leadership of Semapa would be taken over by João Castelo Branco, then director of McKinsey Ibérica. The move coincided with the launch by Semapa of a takeover bid (OPA) on its own capital, offering in return shares of Portucel. This was, strictly speaking, a public exchange offer (OPT) made to Semapa shares that are not owned by Sodim, the family holding controlled by the Queiroz Pereira family. Sodim controls 54.5% of Semapa, which owns 75.8% of Portucel.

He died on 18 August 2018, at the age of 69, after a fatal heart attack on his yacht in Spanish island of Ibiza.
