= Linha de Évora =

Railway line in Portugal

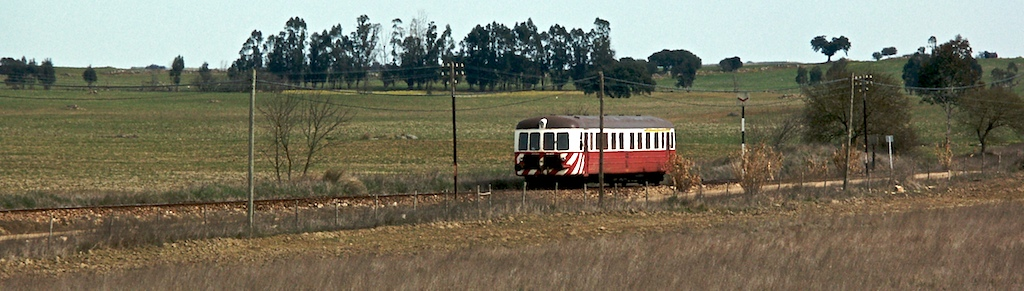
- Nohab on a regional service; 2005, Tojal.

Overview
- Status: Operational
- Owner: Infraestruturas de Portugal
- Termini: Casa Branca; Évora

Technical
- Line length: 139.5 km (86.7 mi)
- Track gauge: Iberian
- Electrification: 25 kV / 50 Hz Overhead line

Location on the network
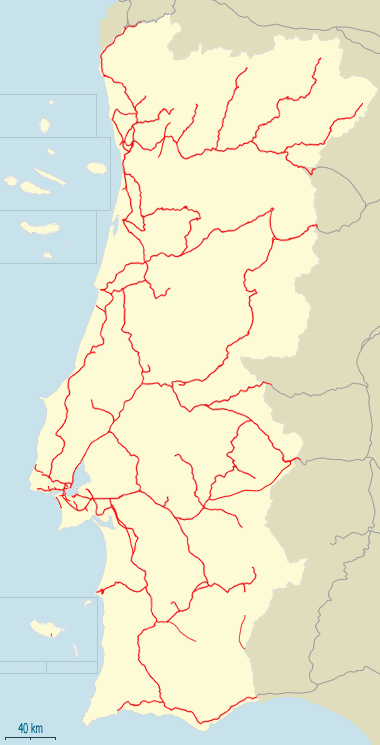

+ Casa Branca × Estremoz (🔎)

Linha de Évora is a railway line in Portugal, which connects Casa Branca and Évora. As of early 2024, there is an ongoing project of continuing the line to Elvas, from where trains could pass into Spain; some rumours even make this extension the first bit of high speed rail in Portugal.

== See also ==
- List of railway lines in Portugal
- List of Portuguese locomotives and railcars
- History of rail transport in Portugal

== Sources ==
- "2019 Network Statement" (PDF). 7 December 2018.
