= Caminho de Ferro de Penafiel à Lixa e Entre-os-Rios =

Portuguese railway line

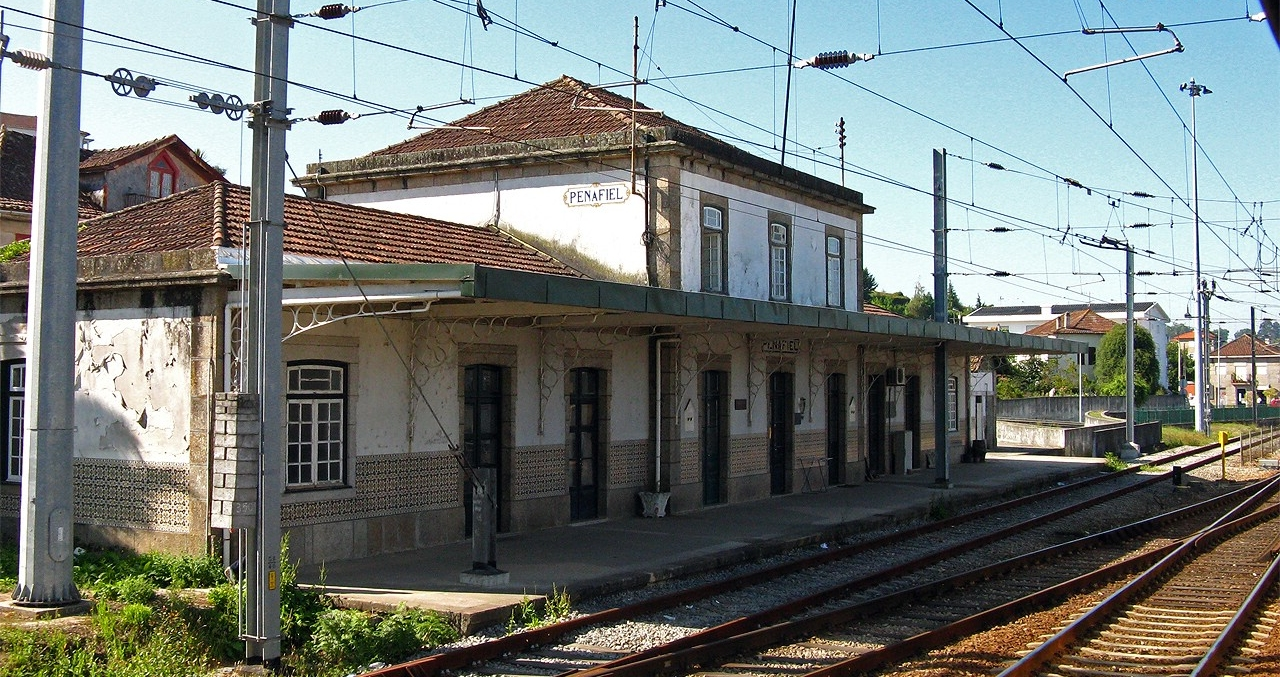
- Penafiel station in 2009.

Overview
- Termini: Entre-os-Rios; Lixa

Technical
- Line length: 45.9 km (28.5 mi)
- Track gauge: 1,000 mm (3 ft 3 3/8 in) metre gauge
Route map
Location on the network

Caminho de Ferro de Penafiel à Lixa e Entre-os-Rios is a closed railway branch in Portugal, which connected the cities of Penafiel, Lixa and Entre-os-Rios. It was opened in 1912 and closed in 1929.

== See also ==
- List of railway lines in Portugal
- History of rail transport in Portugal
