= Ramal de Rio Maior =

Portuguese railway line

Overview
- Status: closed
- Termini: Vale de Santarém; Espadanal mines

Technical
- Line length: 30.4 km (18.9 mi)
- Track gauge: 1,668 mm (5 ft 5 21/32 in) Iberian gauge
Route map
Location on the network

Ramal de Rio Maior was a Portuguese branch line which connected the station of Vale de Santarém, on the Linha do Norte, to the Espadanal mines, in Rio Maior.

== See also ==
- List of railway lines in Portugal
- History of rail transport in Portugal
