= Ramal de Aveiro =

Location on the network
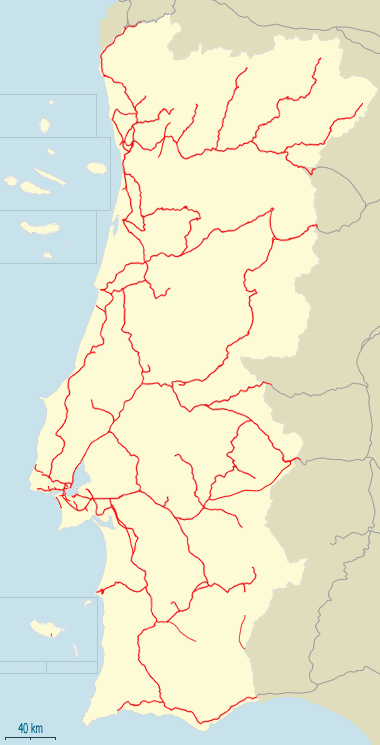

+ Aveiro × Espinho (🔎)

Ramal de Aveiro is a Portuguese metre gauge railway line operated by Comboios de Portugal. It connects Aveiro and Sernada, where it connects with Linha do Vouga.

Since 2002, services on the line have largely been operated by CP's Série 9630 diesel multiple units, which replaced the previous ex-Yugoslav Série 9700 diesel multiple units and the Dutch-built Série 9300 railcars.

== See also ==
- List of railway lines in Portugal
- List of Portuguese locomotives and railcars
- History of rail transport in Portugal
- Narrow gauge railways
- Infraestruturas de Portugal
