= PSI-20 =

Portuguese stock market index

- Foundation: 31 December 1992
- Operator: Euronext
- Exchanges: Euronext Lisbon
- Constituents: 20
- Type: Large cap
- Market cap: €61.50 billion (end 2010)
- Weighting method: Capitalization-weighted
- Related indices: PSI Geral
- Website: www.euronext.com/en/products/indices/PTING0200002-XLIS

The PSI-20 (an acronym of Portuguese Stock Index) is a benchmark stock market index of companies that trade on Euronext Lisbon, the main stock exchange of Portugal. The index tracks the prices of the twenty listings with the largest market capitalisation and share turnover in the PSI Geral, the general stock market of the Lisbon exchange. It is one of the main national indices of the pan-European stock exchange group Euronext alongside Brussels' BEL20, Paris's CAC 40 and Amsterdam's AEX. On August 12, 2021 index has been renamed from PSI-20 to PSI.

== History ==
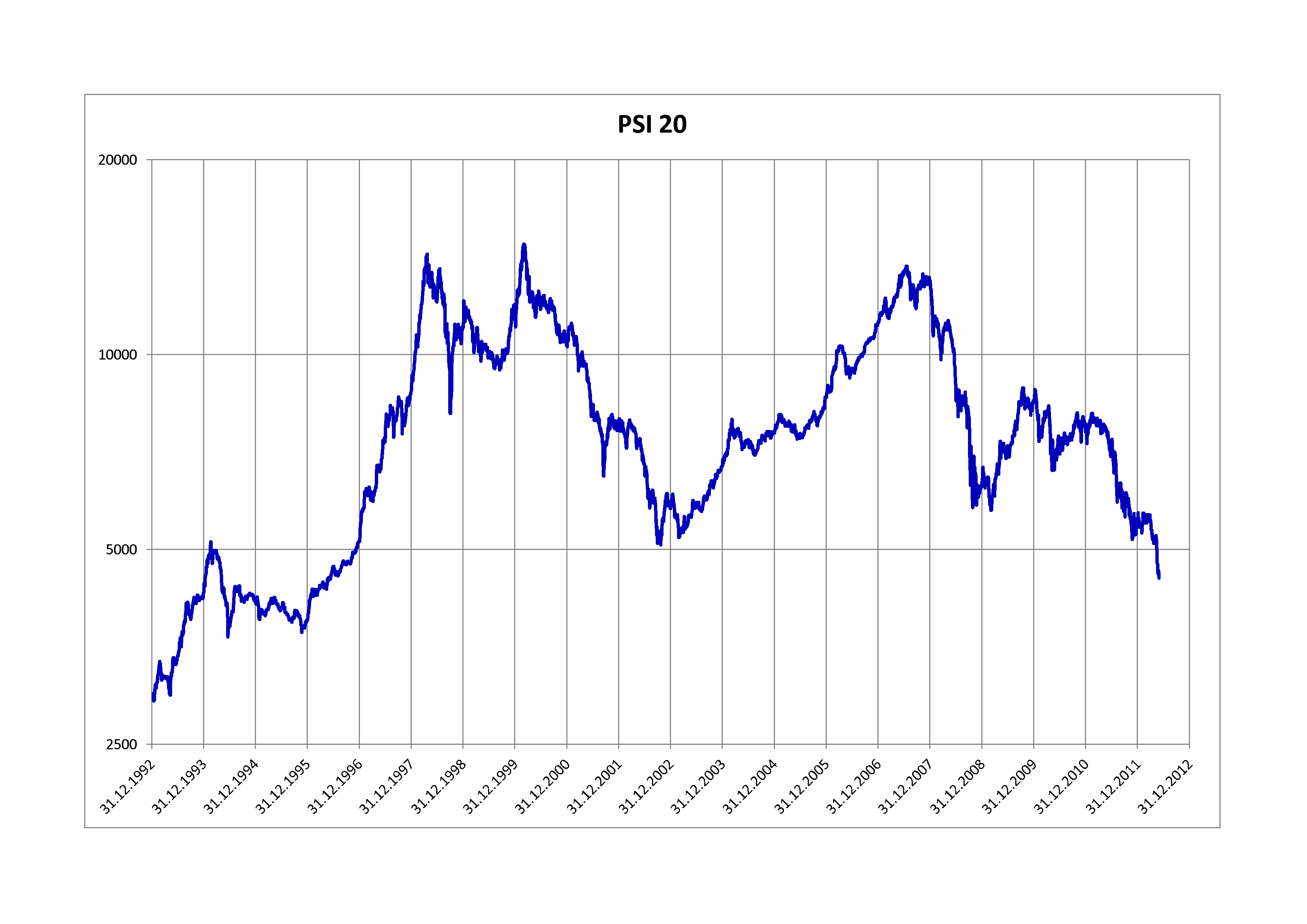
Price evolution of the PSI-20 between 1992 and 2012.

The PSI-20 was initiated on 31 December 1992 with a base value of 3,000 index points. The index experienced considerably more volatility than the world's main financial markets between 1998 and 2000, caused by uncertainty in the world's emerging markets: a sharp increase of over 50% in the PSI-20's value in the first four months of 1998 was followed by a decline of similar magnitude between July and October of that year. Another price surge sparked at the tail end of 1999 peaked with the index's highest value to date, 14,822,59 set on 3 March 2000. The Portuguese blue-chip market's subsequent performance has broadly followed the trends set by other Western indices, falling in the aftermath of the dot-com bubble before recovering significantly from 2003 onwards.

== Annual Returns ==
The following table shows the annual development of the PSI-20 since 1992.

Year	Closing level	Change in index in points	Change in index in %
1992	3,000.00		
1993	4,288.09	1,288.09	42.94
1994	4,157.25	−130.84	−3.05
1995	3,896.24	−261.01	−6.28
1996	5,146.33	1,250.09	32.08
1997	8,803.50	3,657.17	71.06
1998	10,998.92	2,195.42	24.94
1999	11,960.51	961.59	8.74
2000	10,404.09	−1,556.42	−13.01
2001	7,831.49	−2,572.60	−24.73
2002	5,824.70	−2,006.79	−25.62
2003	6,747.41	922.71	15.84
2004	7,600.16	852.75	12.64
2005	8,618.67	1,018.51	13.40
2006	11,197.59	2,578.92	29.92
2007	13,019.36	1,821.77	16.27
2008	6,341.34	−6,678.02	−51.29
2009	8,463.85	2,122.51	33.47
2010	7,588.31	−875.54	−10.34
2011	5,494.27	−2,094.04	−27.60
2012	5,655.15	160.88	2.93
2013	6,558.85	903.70	15.98
2014	4,798.99	−1,759.86	−26.83
2015	5,317.67	518.68	10.81
2016	4,679.20	−638.47	−12.01
2017	5,388.33	709.13	15.15
2018	4,731.47	−656.86	−12.19
2019	5,214.14	482.67	10.20
2020	4,898.36	−315.78	−6.06
2022	5,726.11	156.63	2.81
2023	6,396.48	670.37	11.71
2024	6,377.26	−19.22	−0.30

== Rules ==
The number of constituents of the index (20) is below the generally accepted minimum sample size of 30 required to reach statistical significance.

=== Selection ===
==== Annual review ====
Prior to a change in the index rules in July 2007, the PSI-20 composition was reviewed twice a year in January and July. In a move to increase the stability of the index, the review frequency was at this time switched to annually, commencing on the first trading day of March 2008 (in line with the BEL20 and AEX). Responsibility for the rules and composition of the index rests with an independent PSI Steering Committee, which publishes any decisions a minimum of one month before they become effective.

From the March 2008 reshuffle onwards, prospective PSI-20 companies are required to possess a "trading velocity" (the fraction of the company's free float shares which have changed hands over the previous calendar year) of at least 10% so as to safeguard the liquidity of the index. All listings on the stock exchange which satisfy this criterion are ranked by the total value (in Euros) of shares traded in the previous year (thus taking both market cap and liquidity into consideration), and this classification is used to choose the index's constituents. Any existing constituent which falls below 22nd place in the ranking is automatically removed from the index, and any non-constituent which rises above 18th place is added to the index. If existing constituents occupy positions 21 and/or 22, they stay in the PSI-20 provided no non-constituents have risen above 18th position to replace them. Likewise, non-constituents holding positions 19 and/or 20 are not promoted unless a slot in the index is freed up by a constituent falling below 22nd place.

==== Extraordinary changes ====
If a company is removed from the index outside an annual review as a result of some extraordinary corporate action (such as a merger or delisting due to a takeover), the highest-ranked listing not already in the index is selected to fill the vacancy with immediate effect. This is in contrast to some other Euronext indices such as the AEX, where such slots are not generally filled until the next annual review.

==== "Fast Entry" rule ====
If a newly listed company on Euronext Lisbon possesses a market cap and is predicted to have a liquidity which exceeds that of some existing PSI-20 constituents, then a "Fast Entry" rule can be invoked to insert it into the index. This can occur either shortly after its IPO or on the first trading day of September. The existing constituent with the lowest share turnover is removed to free up a space in the index.

=== Weighting ===
The PSI-20 is a capitalization-weighted index. The market capitalisation used to calculate the weightings of each stock is the so-called free-float band adjusted market cap, where the free float factor (fraction of shares actively available for trade on Euronext Lisbon) is rounded up to the nearest 5%. The weightings of companies in the index were capped (if necessary) at 20% at each semi-annual review prior to the July 2007 rule change, when the capping limit was cut to 15% in line with Euronext's other benchmark national indexes. Weights are allowed to fluctuate freely after index changes are made, but are capped once again at the next reclassification. The capping factors used to scale down the weightings of the largest companies are recalculated each year at the index review.

=== Calculation ===
The index value I of the PSI-20 index is calculated using the following formula:

$I_t = \frac{\sum_{i=1}^N Q_{i,t}\,F_{i,t}\,f_{i,t}\,C_{i,t}\,}{d_{t}\,}$

with t the day of calculation; N the number of constituent shares in the index (usually 20); Q_{i,t} the number of shares of company i on day t; F_{i,t} the free float factor of share i; f_{i,t} the capping factor of share i (exactly 1 for all companies not subject to the 15% cap); C_{i,t} the price of share i on day t; and d_{t} a parameter known as the index divisor.

Company	Industry	Ticker	Weight (%)
Altri	Basic Resources	ALTR	2.03
Banco Comercial Português	Banks	BCP	17.04
Corticeira Amorim	Industrial Goods & Services	COR	2.62
CTT Correios de Portugal	Industrial Goods & Services	CTT	3.02
EDP Renováveis	Utilities	EDPR	9.69
Energias de Portugal	Utilities	EDP	10.36
Galp Energia	Energy	GALP	11.50
Ibersol	Travel & Leisure	IBS	0.93
Jerónimo Martins	Personal Care, Drug & Grocery Stores	JMT	10.55
Mota-Engil	Construction & Materials	EGL	2.22
NOS	Telecommunications	NOS	9.01
Novabase	Technology	NBA	0.24
Pharol	Telecommunications	PHR	0.93
Redes Energéticas Nacionais	Utilities	RENE	4.75
Semapa	Basic Resources	SEM	2.77
Sonae	Personal Care, Drug & Grocery Stores	SON	5.03
Sonae Capital	Financial Services	SONC	0.50
The Navigator Company	Basic Resources	NVG	6.81

== See also ==
- List of Portuguese companies
- List of stock market indices
