= Altri =

Portuguese industrial company

Altri SGPS SA
- Type: Public (Sociedade Anónima)
- Traded as: Euronext Lisbon: ALTR; PSI-20 component
- ISIN: PTALT0AE0002
- Industry: Paper and pulp, energy
- Founded: 2005; 21 years ago
- Headquarters: Porto, Portugal
- Key people: Paulo Fernandes, (Chairman & CEO)
- Products: Bleached wood pulp, cogeneration, biomass power plants
- Revenue: ▲€612 million (2016)
- Operating income: ▲€116 million (2016)
- Net income: ▲€77 million (2016)
- Number of employees: 692 (2016)
- Website: altri.pt

Altri SGPS SA is a Portuguese industrial conglomerate headquartered in Porto. The group's main companies operate in wood pulp production, cultivation of forests for the timber and paper industry and co-generation of energy, including energy production from renewable resources. Prior to 2008 the group also operated in the steelworks industry.

Altri's holding company is Altri SGPS, SA., which is listed on the Euronext Lisbon stock exchange. Its major subsidiaries are Celulose do Caima (paper industry) and Celbi (paper industry). Altri's F. Ramada subsidiary, which produced steel and storage systems such as cold rolled steel sheets and strips, machinery, tools and other related products, was spun off on the stock exchange in 2008. Altri was itself born from a spin-out of the industrial assets of the Cofina group in March 2005.
