= The Navigator Company =

Portuguese materials company

The Navigator Company, S.A.
- Type: Sociedade Anónima
- Traded as: Euronext Lisbon: NVG; PSI-20 component
- ISIN: PTPTI0AM0006
- Industry: Pulp and paper
- Founded: 2001
- Headquarters: Setúbal, Portugal
- Key people: João Castello Branco (CEO)
- Products: newsprint and writing paper; bleached kraft pulp; biomass; timber
- Revenue: € 1.953 billion (2023)
- Operating income: €286.2 million (2012)
- Net income: €211.2 million (2012)
- Total assets: €2.724 billion (2012)
- Total equity: €1.480 billion (2012)
- Number of employees: 2,278 (June 2012)
- Parent: Semapa
- Website: www.thenavigatorcompany.com

The Navigator Company (formerly known as Portucel Soporcel Group) is a Portuguese pulp and paper company.

The Navigator Company has a productive capacity of 1.6 million tonnes of paper and 1.4 million tonnes of pulp, with 1,380 km^{2} of forest, and an annual turnover of over €1.5 billion (US$1.9 billion). The company uses eucalyptus as the prime raw material for the production of pulp and fine printing and writing paper. Portucel is Europe's largest producer of bleached eucalyptus kraft pulp. It is also one of the five largest European producers of uncoated wood-free paper.

Publicly traded on Euronext Lisbon, Portucel is controlled by the industrial conglomerate Semapa which owns almost 77% of its shares.

In 2016, As part of the significant investment in the expansion and internationalization of its production activities, the "Portucel Soporcel Group" has taken the decision to change its corporate brand to "The Navigator Company".

== History ==
The company has its origins in the early 1950s, when the paper mill of Cacia, Baixo Vouga, started its operations. After the Carnation Revolution in 1974, the Portuguese paper industry was nationalized and became highly subsidized by State funds. Following its privatization and acquisition by Semapa in 2004, Portucel Soporcel continued to receive significant state grants and incentives due to its importance to Portugal's export economy and forestry sector.

=== Portucel ===
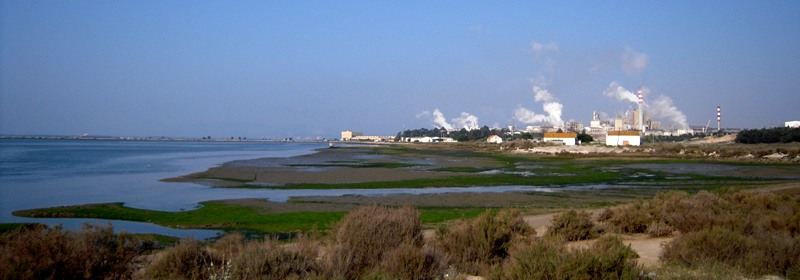
Portucel's factory in Setúbal, Portugal

Portucel began operations at the Cacia mill in 1953 producing raw pine pulp, and became a pioneer worldwide in 1957, when it introduced sulphate bleached eucalyptus pulp, at the kraft process, into its production.

In 1967, at the Setúbal mill, Inapa (pt. Indústria Nacional de Papeis), a portuguese printing paper manufacturer, began its operations in a production unit integrated with Portucel, transforming pulp into paper, that was sold throughout Europe.

Portucel bought Papéis Inapa in 2000, thus creating a strategic partnership, that aimed to restructurize Portugal's pulp and paper sector. With the takeover of Soporcel in 2001, Portucel rebranded itself the Portucel Soporcel Group.

=== Soporcel ===
The Soporcel factory in Figueira da Foz, Portugal, was initially intended to be built in the Portuguese territory of Angola, by then an overseas province of Portugal. Due to the Carnation Revolution in Lisbon on 25 April 1974, the project which included both forestation and construction of industrial facilities in Angola, was delayed and changed. The factory would be installed some years later, in Portugal. Although it began operations in 1984 with the inauguration of the mill at Figueira da Foz, Soporcel had been constituted five years earlier. The first paper machine (PM I) began working in the year 1991, and currently has a capacity of 350,000 tonnes/year.

The installation of the second paper machine (PM II – 425,000 tonnes/year), representing the most advanced technology in the sector, reinforced the position held by the Figueira da Foz mill in the European segment of the uncoated woodfree paper market.

Soporcel was acquired by Portucel in 2001, creating the Portucel Soporcel Group.

=== Gomà-Camps ===
In February 2023, it was announced The Navigator Company had acquired three businesses from the Spanish-headquartered Gomà-Camps Group – its consumer tissue business, including Gomà-Camps Consumer and the French company Gomà Camps France.

== Operations ==
The group's production structure is based at three mills, situated at Setúbal, Figueira da Foz, and Cacia.

The brand Navigator is produced by the group. The Portucel Soporcel Group is responsible for woodland assets in Portugal, totaling approximately 120 thousand hectares. This land is managed in accordance with the principles set out in the group's Forestry Policy. The eucalyptus, more specifically the Eucalyptus globulus species, which is widely used in the production of high-quality paper due to its fibre characteristics, occupies 74% of this area. Due to this role, it is a well known wine, honey, seeds and specific tree (besides eucalyptus which is its main cultivar) producer. It has a well-equipped private fire department to prevent fires within its forests.

Besides its woodland assets and plants in Portugal, Portucel has developing since 2010 forestation and industrial projects abroad. It studied extensive forestry and industrial investments in Uruguay, Brazil, and Angola, but ultimately selected Mozambique for further development.
