= Semapa =

Portuguese materials conglomerate

Semapa - Sociedade de Investimento e Gestão, SGPS, S.A.
- Company type: Public (Sociedade Anónima)
- Traded as: Euronext Lisbon: SEM
- ISIN: PTSEM0AM0004
- Industry: Conglomerate
- Founded: 1991
- Headquarters: Lisbon, Portugal
- Key people: Pedro Queiroz Pereira (founder)
- Revenue: €2.71 billion (2023)
- Operating income: €282.8 million (2010)
- Net income: €126.7 million (2010)
- Total assets: €3.570 billion (end 2010)
- Total equity: €1.244 billion (end 2010)
- Number of employees: 6,550 (2023)
- Subsidiaries: The Navigator Company, Secil, Grupo ETSA
- Website: www.semapa.pt

Semapa - Sociedade de Investimento e Gestão (English: Semapa - Investment and Management Company) is a Portuguese conglomerate holding company with interests in the cement, pulp and paper and environmental services sectors.

The company owns 76.7% of The Navigator Company, previously known as Portucel Soporcel, Europe's largest producer of bleached eucalyptus kraft pulp. It also holds 51% of Secil Group, a manufacturer of cement and its derivatives; and 100% of ETSA, a waste management firm involved in the collection, storage and treatment of animal by-products.

The company is listed on Euronext Lisbon stock exchange and is a constituent of the PSI 20 index.
