= Infraestruturas de Portugal =

Public company administering road and rail infrastructure in Portugal

- Founded: 2015
- Headquarters: Lisbon, Portugal
- Website: http://www.infraestruturasdeportugal.pt

Infraestruturas de Portugal, S.A. (IP) is a state-owned company which resulted from the merger of Rede Ferroviária Nacional (REFER) and Estradas de Portugal (EP). It manages the Portuguese rail and road infrastructure. The company has been a member of ERESS since 2024.

== Network ==
=== Road ===
Total length, as of January 2019: 15.253 km

Main roads and motorways:

- Valença International Bridge, (IP1 variante de Valença)
- IC28 (Ponte de Lima-Ponte da Barca)
- VCI/IC23 (Via de Cintura Interna do Porto) with the Arrábida and Freixo bridges and (A20) access
- EN1/IC2 (Porto-Lisboa)
- Variante de Vilar Formoso (IP5)
- IP3 (Coimbra-Viseu)
- IC6 (IP3-Tábua)
- IC12 (Santa Comba Dão-Canas de Senhorim)
- A23 (section Torres Novas-Abrantes)
- IP6 no Alto Alentejo (Fratel-Estremoz)
- IP6 (Peniche-Óbidos)
- IC13 (Portalegre-Alter do Chão)
- Salgueiro Maia Cridge e acessos (IC10)
- Eixo Norte-Sul
- IC16 (Radial da Pontinha)
- CRIL/IC17 (Circular Regional Interna de Lisboa)
- IC19 (Radial de Sintra)
- IC22 (Radial de Odivelas)
- IC1 (section Grândola-Albufeira)
- IC27 (Alcoutim-Castro Marim)
- Guadiana International Bridge

=== Rail ===
Total length, as of January 2019: 2.562 km

==== Lines ====
- Linha do Minho
- Ramal de Braga
- Linha de Guimarães
- Linha do Douro
- Linha de Leixões
- Linha do Tua
- Linha do Norte
- Linha do Vouga
- Ramal de Aveiro
- Linha da Beira Alta
- Ramal de Alfarelos
- Linha do Oeste
- Ramal de Tomar
- Ramal da Lousã
- Linha de Vendas Novas
- Linha do Leste
- Linha da Beira Baixa
- Linha de Cintura
- Linha de Sintra
- Linha de Cascais
- Linha do Alentejo
- Linha de Évora
- Linha do Sul
- Linha do Algarve

==== New lines ====
- The Nova Linha de Évora is under construction as of 2023.

==== Main railway stations ====
- Aveiro
- Barreiro
- Beja
- Braga
- Cais do Sodré
- Cascais
- Coimbra-B
- Coimbra
- Évora
- Faro
- Figueira da Foz
- Guarda
- Guimarães
- Lagos
- Lisboa-Oriente
- Lisboa-Santa Apolónia
- Lisboa-Rossio
- Lisboa-Entrecampos
- Pocinho
- Porto-São Bento
- Porto-Campanhã
- Régua
- Setúbal
- Viana do Castelo
- Vila Real de Santo António

==== Border stations ====
- Valença
- Vilar Formoso
- Elvas

==== Junction stations ====
- Abrantes
- Alcântara-Terra
- Alfarelos
- Bifurcação de Lares
- Casa Branca
- Entroncamento
- Ermesinde
- Lamarosa
- Lousado
- Mira Sintra-Meleças
- Nine
- Pampilhosa
- Pinhal Novo
- Tunes

==== Metre-gauge stations ====
- Mirandela
- Espinho-Vouga
- Sernada do Vouga
- Águeda
