= Linha do Alentejo =

Railway line in Portugal

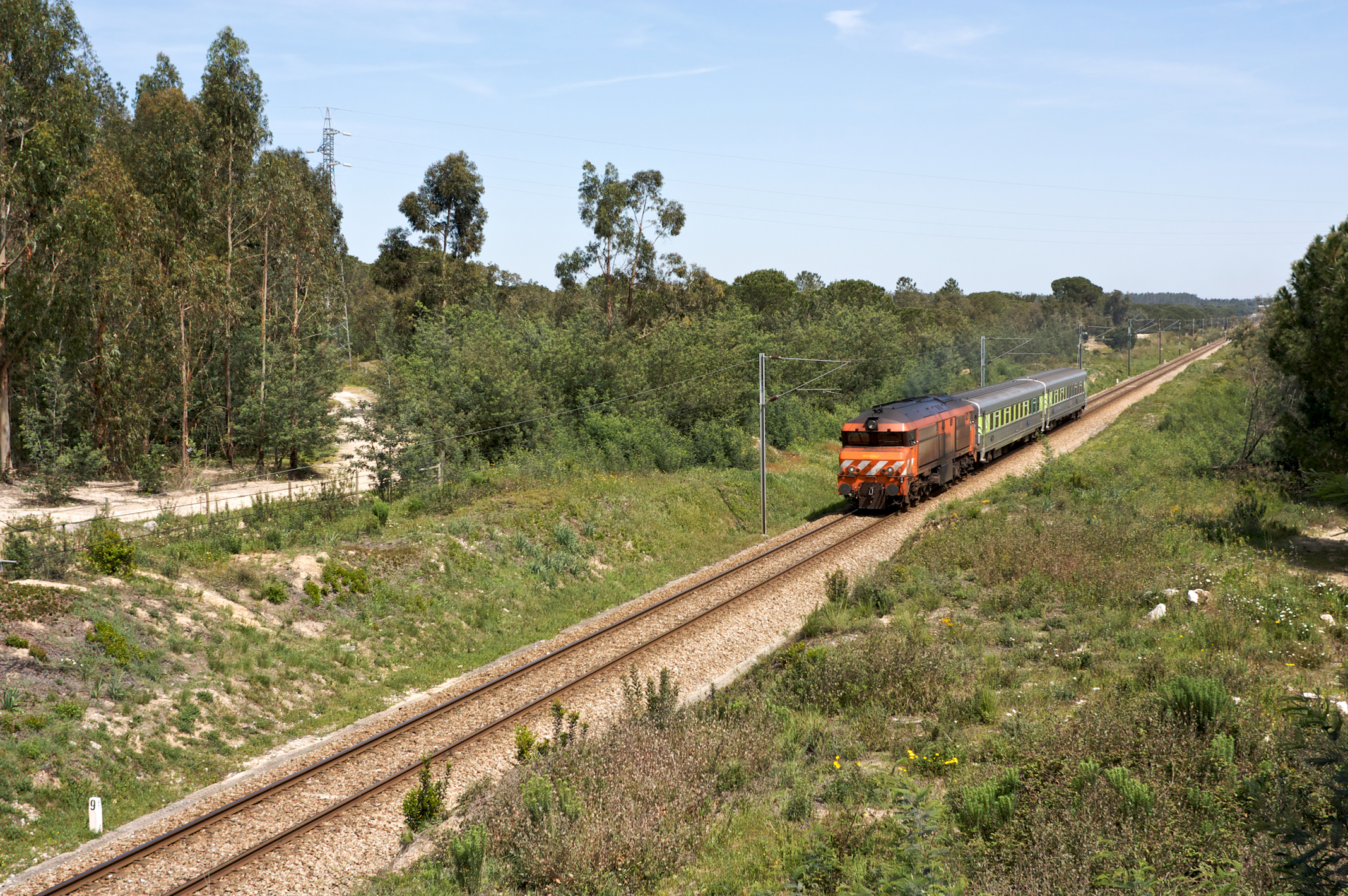
- Intercidades train close to Bombel.

Overview
- Status: Operational
- Owner: Infraestruturas de Portugal
- Termini: Barreiro; Funcheira

Service
- Operator(s): Comboios de Portugal

Technical
- Line length: 166.3 km (103.3 mi)
- Track gauge: 1,668 mm (5 ft 5 21/32 in) Iberian gauge
- Electrification: 25 kV / 50 kHz Overhead line (Barreiro to Casa Branca and Ourique to Funcheira)

Location on the network
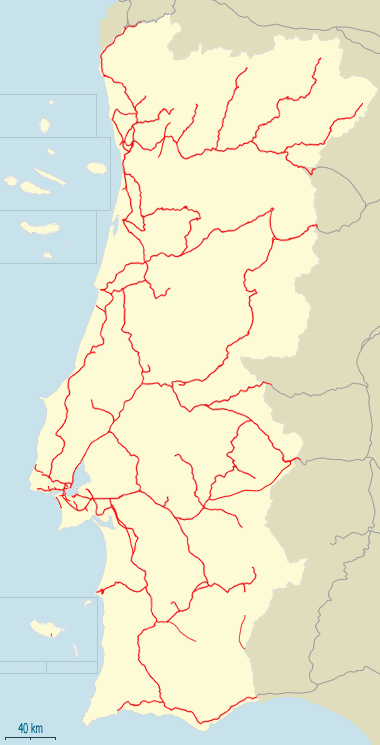

+ Barreiro × Funcheira (🔎)

Linha do Alentejo is a railway line which connects Barreiro and Funcheira, in Portugal. The first section, from Barreiro to Bombel, was opened in 1857 as Caminho de Ferro do Sul; the section between Barreiro, Beja, and Tunes was classified as Linha do Sul at the start of the 20th century, and, in 1992, the section between Barreiro, Beja Funcheira was classified as Linha do Alentejo.

== See also ==
- List of railway lines in Portugal
- List of Portuguese locomotives and railcars
- History of rail transport in Portugal

== Literature ==
- Santos, Luís Filipe Rosa (1995). Os Acessos a Faro e aos Concelhos Limítrofes na Segunda Metade do Séc. XIX (in Portuguese). Faro: Câmara Municipal de Faro.
