= Euronext Lisbon =

Stock exchange in Lisbon, Portugal

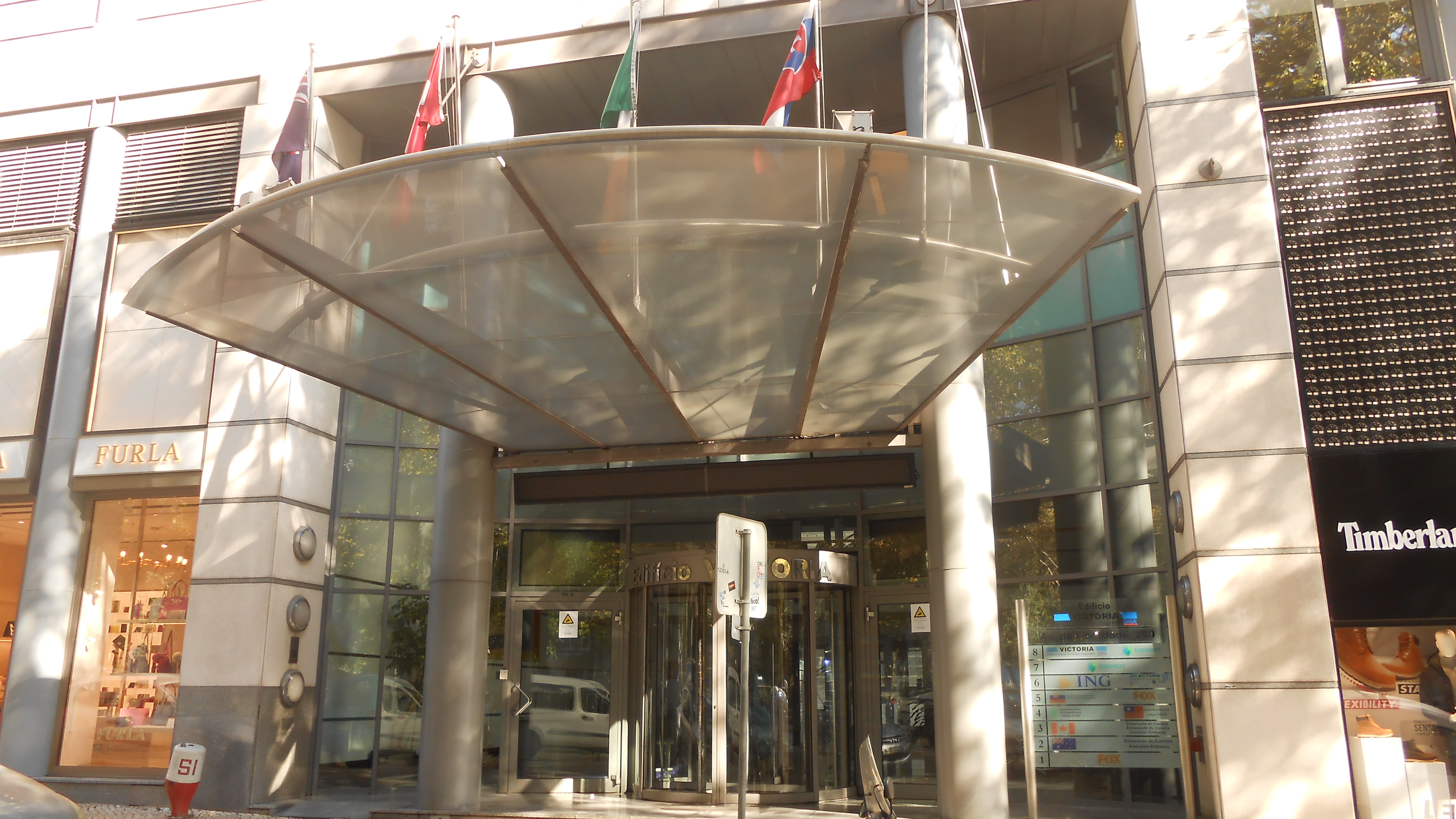
- Type: Stock exchange
- Location: Lisbon, Portugal
- Coordinates: 38.7210105°N 9.1456241°W
- Founded: 1769; 257 years ago
- Owner: Euronext
- Key people: Paulo Rodrigues da Silva (CEO)
- Currency: EUR
- No. of listings: 52
- Market cap: EUR 94.4 billion (February 2026)
- Indices: PSI-20
- Website: live.euronext.com/en/markets/lisbon

Euronext Lisbon is a stock exchange in Lisbon, Portugal. It is part of Euronext pan-European exchange. The most famous index is PSI-20.

Euronext Lisbon trades equities, public and private bonds, participation bonds, warrants, corporate warrants, investment trust units, and exchange traded funds. The BVL General index is the exchanges official index, and includes all listed shares on the official market. Settlement is T+2. Derivatives include long-term interest rate futures, three-month Lisbor futures, stock index futures and options on the PSI-20 Stock index, and Portuguese stock futures. Trading hours are 8 a.m. to 4:30 p.m., Monday through Friday.

== History ==
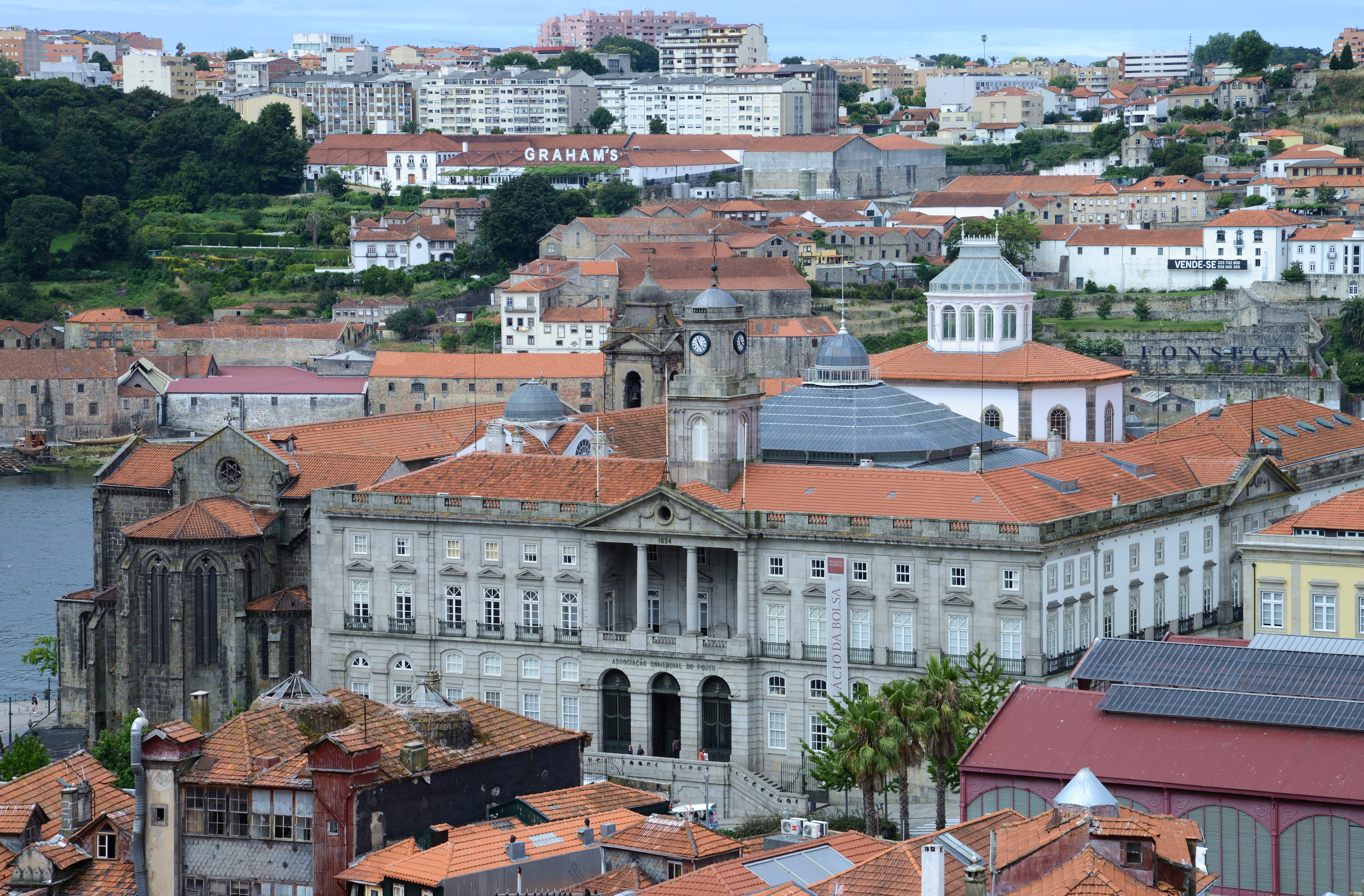
The Stock Exchange Palace in Porto, Portugal

The predecessor of the Bolsa de Valores de Lisboa (Lisbon Stock Exchange) was created in 1769 as the Assembleia dos Homens de Negócio (Assembly of Businessmen) in the Commerce Square, Lisbon downtown. In 1891, the Bolsa de Valores do Porto (Porto Stock Exchange) in Porto was founded.

After the military coup on April 25, 1974, both the Lisbon and Porto stock exchanges were closed by the revolutionary National Salvation Junta (they would be reopened a couple of years later).

The Euronext Lisbon was formed in 2002 when the shares of Bolsa de Valores de Lisboa e Porto (BVLP) were acquired by Euronext and the exchange was merged into the pan-European exchange. BVLP, the Portuguese exchange, was formed in the 1990s restructuring of the Lisbon Stock Exchange association and the Porto Derivatives Exchange Association.

At the end of 2001, 65 companies were listed on BVLP-regulated markets, representing a market capitalization of Euro 96.1 billion. From January to December 2001, a total of 4.7 million futures and options contracts were traded on the BVLP market.

The merger of Bolsa de Valores de Lisboa e Porto (Portuguese Stock Exchange) with Euronext in 2002 that created the Euronext Lisbon, part of the pan-European Euronext system of stock exchanges, improved market efficiency during the post-merger period and marked a new milestone in the financial development of Portugal.

In 2007, after the merger of Euronext and the NYSE, Euronext Lisbon joined the new NYSE Euronext group, the largest corporation operating multiple securities exchanges in the world. A few years later, part of a Intercontinental Exchange's deal to acquire NYSE Euronext was a spin-off for Euronext. In June 2014 Euronext completed an initial public offering making it again a standalone company. After this operation, the Euronext Lisbon remained a fully owned subsidiary of Euronext N.V. headquartered in Paris and registered in Amsterdam.

== See also ==
- List of European stock exchanges
- Portuguese Securities Market Commission
- Euronext Amsterdam
- Euronext Brussels
- Euronext Paris
