= Iberian-gauge railway =

Railway track gauge (1668 mm)

Iberian gauge (Spanish: ancho ibérico, trocha ibérica, Portuguese: bitola ibérica) is a track gauge of 1,668 mm (5 ft 5 21/32 in), most extensively used by the railways of Spain and Portugal. A broad gauge, it is the second-widest gauge in regular use anywhere in the world, with only Indian gauge railways, 5 ft 6 in (1,676 mm), being wider (by 8 mm (5/16 in)).

As finally established in 1955, the Iberian gauge is a compromise between the similar, but slightly different, gauges adopted as respective national standards in Spain and Portugal in the mid-19th century. The main railway networks of Spain were initially constructed to a 1,672 mm (5 ft 5 13/16 in) gauge of six Castilian feet. Those of Portugal were instead built to a 1,435 mm (4 ft 8 1/2 in) and later railways to a 1,664 mm (5 ft 5 1/2 in) gauge of five Portuguese feet – close enough to allow interoperability with Spanish railways.

== Standard gauge ==
Since the beginning of the 1990s new high-speed passenger lines in Spain have been built to the international standard gauge of 1,435 mm (4 ft 8 1/2 in), to allow these lines to link to the European high-speed network. Although the 22 km (14 mi) from Tardienta to Huesca (part of a branch from the Madrid to Barcelona high-speed line) has been reconstructed as mixed Iberic and standard gauge, in general the interface between the two gauges in Spain is dealt with by means of gauge-changing installations, which can adjust the gauge of appropriately designed wheelsets on the move.

Plans exist to convert more of the Iberian-gauge network in Spain and Portugal to standard gauge, an indication of which is the use, on several stretches of recently relaid broad-gauge track, of concrete sleepers pre-drilled with additional bolt holes allowing for repositioning of one rail to adjust the track to standard gauge (or to dual gauge) or the narrowing of the gauge by moving both rails closer together maintaining the perfect alignment of the loading gauge.

== Similar gauges and compatibility ==
The Indian gauge (1,676 mm or 5 ft 6 in) is closely similar, with only 8 mm (5/16 in) difference, and allows compatibility with the rolling stock. For example, in recent years Chile and Argentina have bought second hand Spanish/Portuguese Iberian-gauge rolling stock. 1,668 mm trains can run on 1,676 mm gauge without adaptation, but for better stability in high-speed running a replacement wheelset may be required (for example, the Russian-Finnish train Allegro is built for a 1,522 mm track gauge, intermediate between the Russian 1,520 mm and the Finnish 1,524 mm). Backward compatibility—1,676 mm trains on 1,668 mm gauge—is possible, but no examples or data exist. Due to the somewhat narrower gauge, a strong wear of the wheels may occur if the wheelset is not replaced.

== Iberian-gauge railway networks ==
Country/territory	Railway
Portugal	Infraestruturas de Portugal network. Adjusted from the original 1,664 mm (5 ft 5 1/2 in) in the 19th century. Other gauges used in Portugal: 7 ft 1/4 in (2,140 mm) or 7 ft (2,134 mm) (Azores), 1,435 mm (4 ft 8 1/2 in), 1,000 mm (3 ft 3 3/8 in), 900 mm (2 ft 11 7/16 in), and 600 mm (1 ft 11 5/8 in)
Spain	Adjusted from the original 1,672 mm (5 ft 5 13/16 in) in the 19th century. Adif-managed national railway network (except new high-speed railway lines). Although Lleida–La Pobla de Segur Line is both managed and operated by Ferrocarrils de la Generalitat de Catalunya (FGC), it was formerly part of the national railway network and was constructed to the 1,668 mm (5 ft 5 21/32 in) gauge. Barcelona Metro line 1 still uses the former 1674 mm gauge.

== See also ==
- History of rail transport in Portugal
- History of rail transport in Spain
- Rail transport in Portugal
- Rail transport in Spain
- Track gauge in Spain
