= History of rail transport in Portugal =

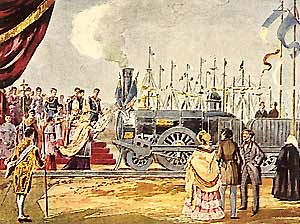
Inauguration of the first railway line in Portugal. Watercolor by Alfredo Roque Gameiro, Portuguese watercolor painter.

The history of rail transport in Portugal dates from 28 October 1856, when Portugal's first railway line was opened between Lisbon and Carregado: the Companhia dos Caminhos de Ferro Portugueses.

The network was gradually expanded both south of the Tagus and to the north of the country, as well as in the metropolitan areas of Lisbon and Porto and to Spain. In 1887 the Douro railway line was completed; also in 1887 the Sud Express from Lisbon to France operated for the first time.

In 1892 a law was passed creating the Board of Directors of the CF Estado (State Railways), but most railways remain in private ownership albeit with greater state regulation and requirement for co-operation. In 1910 the Portuguese monarchy was replaced by a republican constitution; there were also notable strikes by railway workers in 1910, 1911, 1912, 1914, 1918, 1919, 1920, 1922 and 1923.

In 1926 the railway between Cascais and Lisbon was electrified at 1500 volts DC and the line's new Lisbon station at Cais do Sodre was completed in 1928. In 1927, the state-owned lines were leased to CP - thus bringing most railways in Portugal under a single management. In 1945, the Portuguese Government decided to end the system of separate company franchises; in 1951 the entire network was run by CP (with the exception of the Cascais line, which did not become fully part of CP until 1976).

Between 1936 and 1939 the Sud Express service was suspended because of the Spanish Civil War.

In 1943, the Sorefame company was established, becoming the principal supplier of Portuguese rolling stock until its closure in 2004.

In 1944 and 1945 train services throughout Portugal had to be severely reduced due to nationwide shortage of coal, which also prompted CP to investigate and order diesel locomotives and railcars. The first mainline diesel locomotives (Série 1500) were introduced in 1948, as were the Swedish-built Série 0100 diesel railcars.

In 1957 overhead electrification (at 25 kV 50 Hz) was introduced between Lisbon and Entroncamento. The electrification was extended northwards to Porto in 1966. The final steam locomotives on the Iberian gauge lines were withdrawn from service in the 1970s; some steam workings on metre gauge lines continued into the 1980s.

In 1959 the first line of the Lisbon Metro opened. In the same year, the first wide-gauge locomotives CP Class 3150 were used.

Following the Carnation Revolution in 1974, CP was nationalised in 1975.

In 1988, the metre gauge Sabor and Dão lines closed, followed by the northern sections of the remaining Douro metre gauge lines in 1990.

Until 1999 there was no rail crossing over the River Tagus at Lisbon; all trains to/from the Algarve had to terminate at Barreiro on the south bank of the River Tagus and passengers had to cross the river by ferry. The 25th April Bridge was subsequently adapted to include a rail deck and through services commenced from Lisbon to the Algarve, as well as the Fertagus commuter rail service.

In 1999 the Alfa Pendular high speed electric tilting train service was introduced on the Braga-Oporto-Lisbon-Faro line, with through trains south of Lisbon starting in 2003.

The early years of the 21st century saw the contraction of the network, notably the closure of most of the narrow gauge railways in Portugal (such as the highly scenic Tua line). After 2009, the only metre gauge lines left in service were the Metro de Mirandela (closed in December 2018) and the Vouga line.

== See also ==
- Comboios de Portugal
- History of Portugal
- Iberian gauge
- Larmanjat guided rail system
- Narrow gauge railways in Portugal
- National Railway Museum (Portugal)
- Rail transport in Portugal
- Sorefame - rolling stock manufacturer
