= Comboios de Portugal =

Portuguese railway company

- Type: Statutory corporation
- Industry: Rail transport
- Predecessor: Portuguese Railway Company
- Founded: 15 April 1975
- Headquarters: Lisbon, Portugal
- Key people: Nuno Pinho da Cruz Leite de Freitas, Pedro Miguel Sousa Pereira Guedes Moreira, Ana Maria dos Santos Malhó, Maria Isabel de Magalhães Ribeiro, Pedro Manuel Franco Ribeiro
- Revenue: € 288.559 million (2018)
- Operating income: € -36.9 million (2018)
- Net income: € -105.6 million (2018)
- Owner: Government of Portugal
- Number of employees: 2,658 (2018)
- Website: www.cp.pt

Comboios de Portugal
- Map showing the railway lines in Portugal operated by CP in 2023

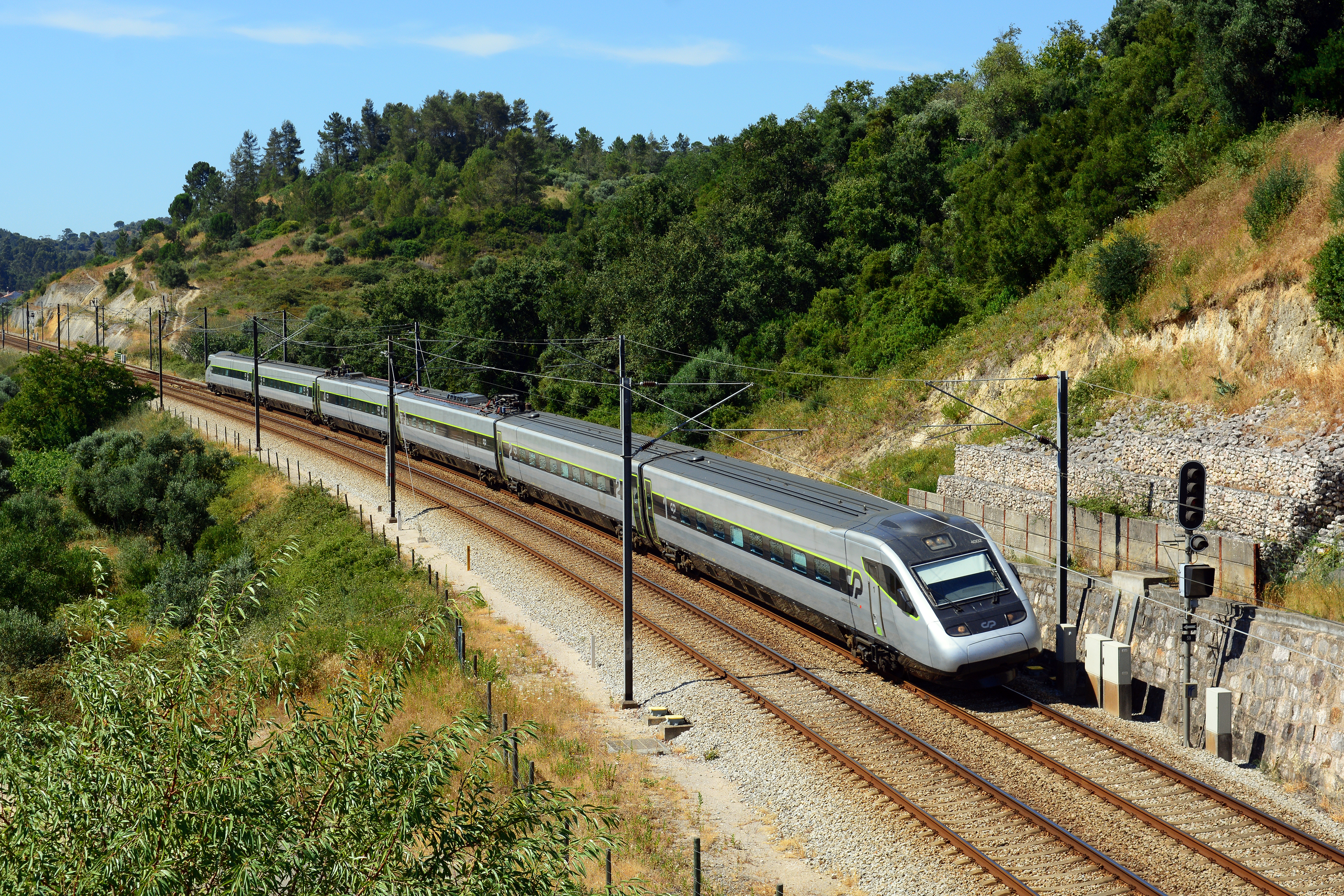
- CP Alfa Pendular train in 2020

Technical
- Track gauge: 1,668 mm (5 ft 5 21/32 in) Iberian gauge and 1,000 mm (3 ft 3 3/8 in) metre gauge

CP — Comboios de Portugal, EPE ([kõˈbɔjuʒ ðɨ puɾtuˈɣal]; lit. 'Trains of Portugal') is Portugal's national state-owned railway company, which operates passenger trains in Portugal. Prior to June 2009, CP stood for Caminhos de Ferro Portugueses (English: Portuguese Railways) although the company has been using its current designation as a brand name since 2004.

CP can trace its origins back to October 1856 and the opening of the first railway line in Portugal; the majority of the network has long comprised Iberian gauge lines, compatible with neighboring Spain. During the 1950s, the Portuguese railway network spanned roughly 3,750 km (2,330 mi), its greatest extent. In 1975, the Portuguese Railway Company was nationalised. Amid a decline in passenger numbers, various lines were shut down, with almost a quarter of the rail network being closed by the twenty-first century.

During the 1990s, there were efforts to restructure and improve CP services. In 1999, CP introduced its new flagship service, the Alfa Pendular, which operates between Braga - Porto - Lisbon - Faro using tilting trains. Since 2005, management of the railway infrastructure has been split from CP, which instead focuses on train services, while the former role is now performed by Infraestruturas de Portugal (IP). Also, CP's cargo activities were transferred to private company MSC who operate them under the Medway label; leaving CP to only operate passenger trains. In 2015, a new long-term strategy for Portugal's railway network has been underway, under which full electrification of the network, the provision of European Rail Traffic Management System (ERTMS), and the general modernisation and improvement of trunk routes and international services is being conducted. Throughout early 2023, CP's operations have been repeatedly disrupted by industrial action.

== History ==
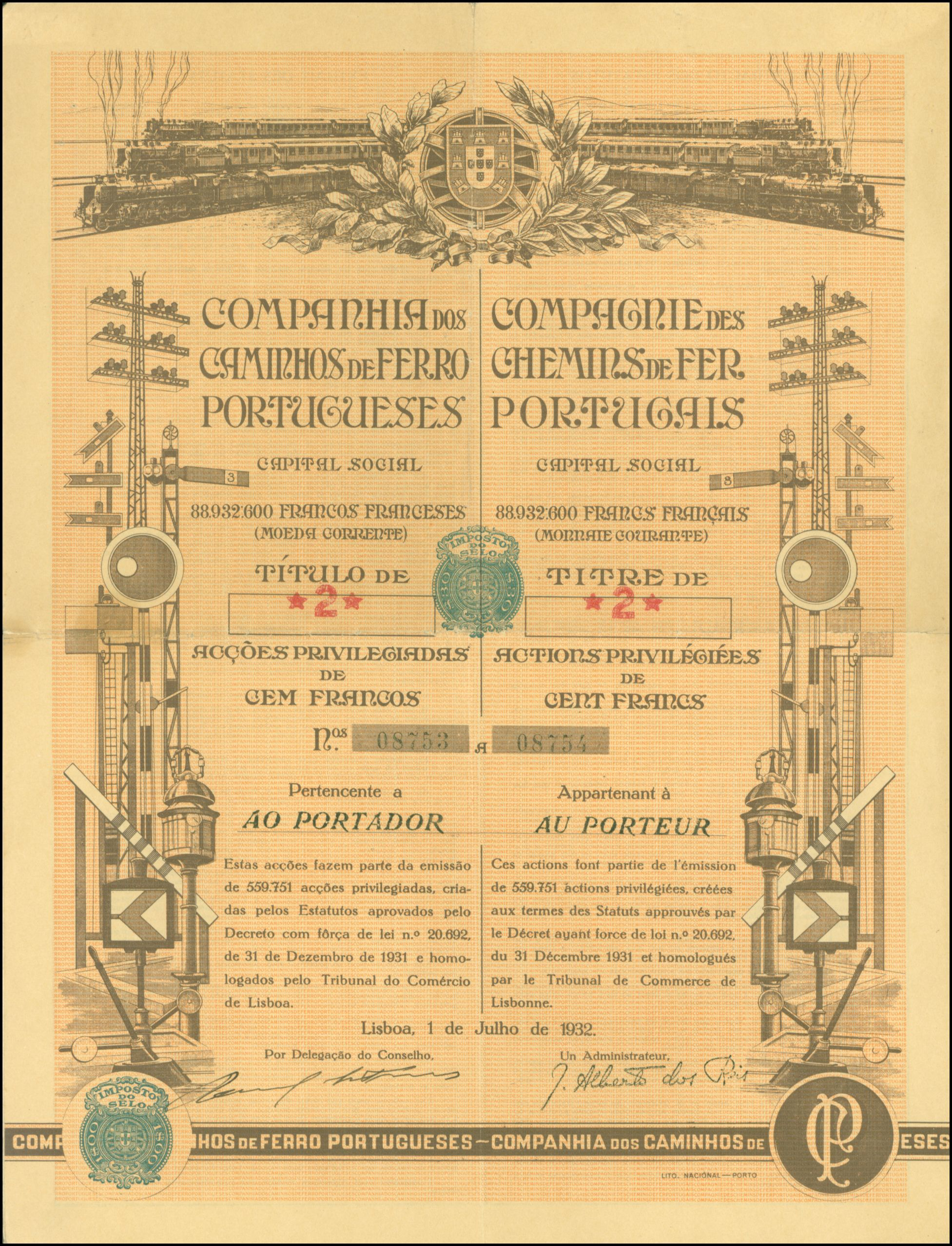
Share of the Companhia dos Caminhos de Ferro Portugueses, issued 1. July 1932

On 28 October 1856, the first railway line in Portugal was inaugurated between Lisbon and Carregado; the event marked the origins of the Companhia dos Caminhos de Ferro Portugueses. While the early railways in Portugal had been constructed in standard gauge, subsequent lines were built to the Iberian gauge as to be compatible with neighboring Spain; the initial standard gauge tracks were also rebuilt into Iberian gauge for consistency.

The railway network was gradually expanded both south of the Tagus and to the north of the country, as well as in the metropolitan areas of Lisbon and Porto and to Spain. Portugal's railways would play a role in numerous significant national events. On 14 December 1910; President Sidonio Bernardino Cardeso da Silva Paes was assassinated at Lisboa-Rossio Railway Station of one of the presidents of the first republic. In 1958, a railway rout formed a prominent part of the political campaign of the democratic opposition candidate Humberto Delgado for the Portuguese presidency. More generally, the railways had been crucial to the rapid dissemination of news across the more rural areas of the nation.

It was during the 1950s that the Portuguese railway network expanded to its greatest extent, covering roughly 3,750 km (2,330 mi). Throughout the second half of the 20th century, the majority of CP's rolling stock was built in Portugal by Sorefame - notably carriages with stainless steel bodywork. Gradually, electrification was put in place for a little less than half the network. In 1975, the company was nationalised, after which its name was shortened to CP. During the 1970s and especially during the 1980s, as cars became increasingly affordable to average citizens, passenger demand on CP's network declined considerably, spurring decreases in investment, the cutting back on little-used services, and the closure of less trafficked lines. By the twenty-first century, almost a quarter of the rail network had been closed, around 2,630 km (1,630 mi) remained operational, while of the roughly 900 stations once active, only 563 remained in use by 2023.

During the 1990s, CP inaugurated new trains for its suburban service within Lisbon; during 2001, new rolling stock was brought into service on Porto's suburban services as well. In September 2012, the Portuguese government announced its intention to privatise portions of the suburban rail services of Lisbon and Porto via a leasing arrangement. The move was part of a wider initiative towards increasing the liberalisation of the domestic Portuguese rail network.

During 1999, CP introduced its new flagship service, the Alfa Pendular, which operates between Braga - Porto - Lisbon - Faro. Using a fleet of FIAT/Siemens tilting trains, it has a maximum operating speed of 220 km/h (138 mph). Despite this, the majority of Portugal's lines were not suitable for high speed operations, which was a partial consequence of the protracted lack of investment. By 2006, CP's network covers the majority of the country.

Various changes to modernise and improve CP's railway network were proposed during the early twenty-first century. At the time, the infrastructure suffered from a lack of uniformity, particularly in respect to signalling and electrical supply systems, while freight services were subject to numerous restrictions even on heavily trafficked trunk lines. A programme of works to finally connect all the district capitals by a fully electrified double line was to be implemented from 2010; elements of this plan were based on the Swiss Rail 2000 model. Furthermore, the Portuguese government was keen to improve intermobility between the rail network and various other logistic platforms, such as airports and seaports, as well as to improve links with pan-European transportation mediums in general.

In 2015, a new long-term strategy for Portugal's railway network was announced; it called for the full electrification of the network, along with the provision of European Rail Traffic Management System (ERTMS) signaling and control apparatus, infrastructure compliance with the relevant European standards along all of the main freight corridors for complete interoperability, and changed to enable the running of 750 m (2,460 ft)-long trains carrying up to 1,400 tonnes of cargo. Particular attention was paid to the modernisation of those lines used by international services and trunk routes that traversed the country.

During 2019, CP transported 145 million passengers, an increase of 19 million from the previous year.

Throughout early 2023, CP's passenger services have been repeatedly disrupted by industrial action taken by its employees.

As of 2025, the Vouga line is the only narrow gauge line that remains operational.

== Infrastructure ==
The infrastructure of the Portuguese network is managed by Infraestruturas de Portugal, usually abbreviated to IP

Portuguese railway network extent:

- Broad gauge (1,668 mm (5 ft 5 21/32 in)): 2,603 km (1,617 mi), 1,351 km (839 mi) electrified at 25 kV 50 Hz AC and 25 km (16 mi) at 1.5 kV DC.
- Narrow gauge (metre gauge) 1,000 mm (3 ft 3 3/8 in): 188 km (117 mi) not electrified.
- The maximum extent of 3,592 km (2,232 mi) was reached in 1949, but in the late 1980s and early 1990s some lines were shortened and some totally closed.

== Organisation ==
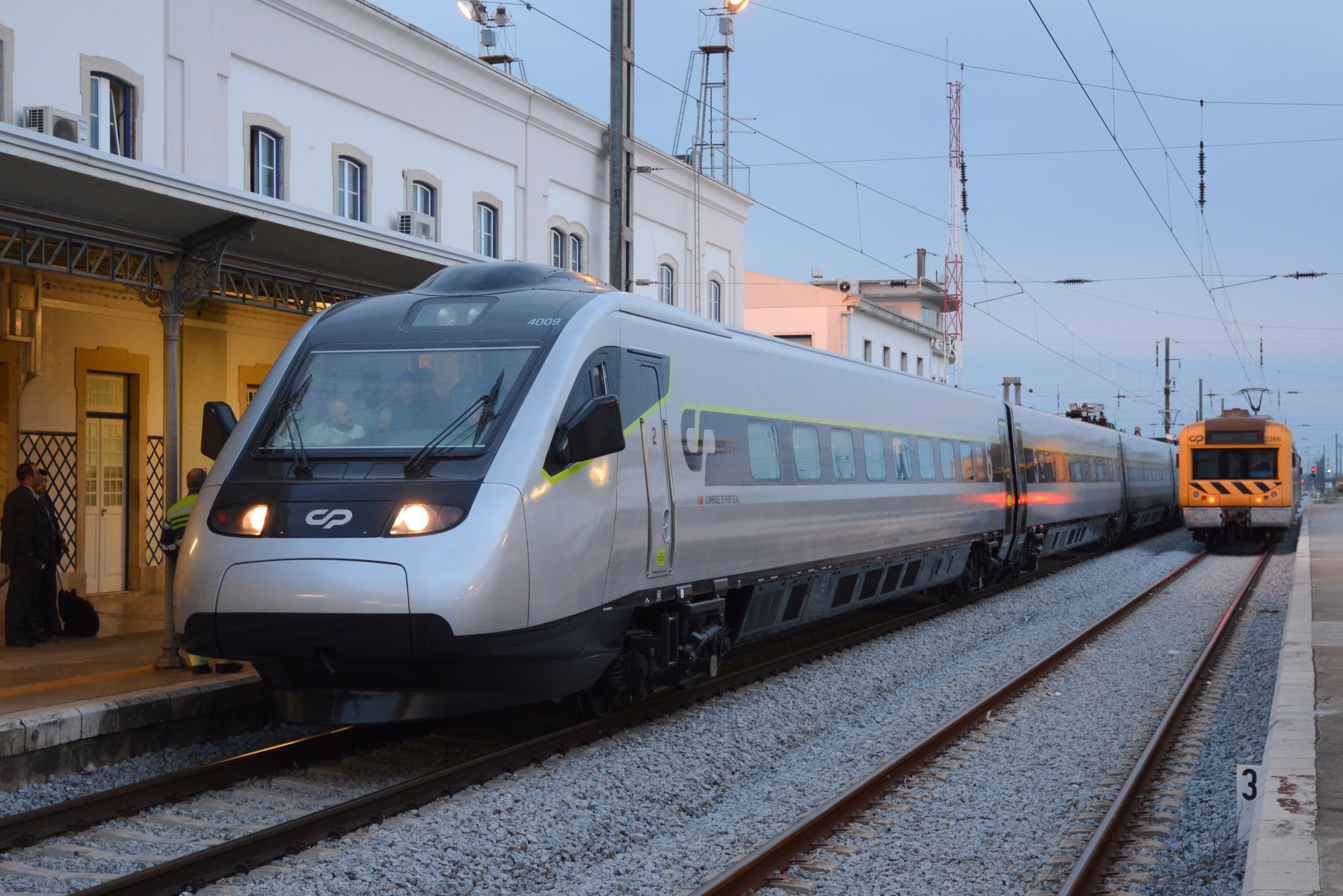
CP's Alfa Pendular tilting train

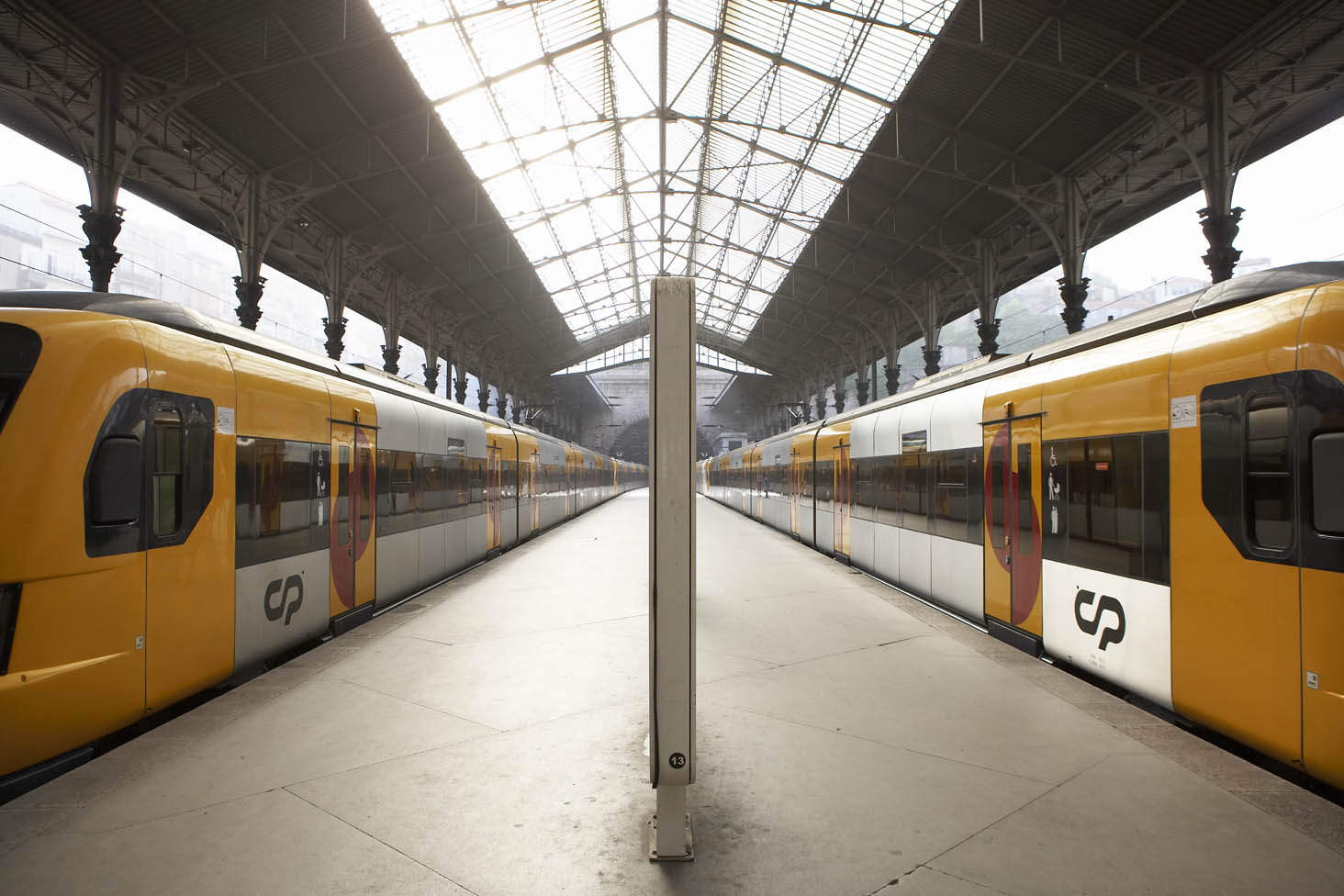
CP suburban trains at São Bento Station in Porto

CP is split into three divisions:

- CP Longo Curso, long-distance mainline services (Alfa Pendular, Intercidades and International trains).
- CP Regional, regional services (Interregional and Regional).
- CP Urban Services
  - CP Lisboa, Lisbon's suburban network.
  - CP Porto, Porto's suburban network.
  - CP Coimbra, Coimbra's suburban network.

== Services ==
CP offers the following types of trains:

- International (IN) is a long-distance international intercity service. The service connects Portugal with Galicia, Spain and is called Celta (Porto-Vigo). The Sud-Express (Lisbon-Hendaye) and Lusitânia (Lisbon-Madrid) ran to both Spain and France under Renfe's Trenhotel (Hotel Train) brand until it was discontinued in 2020
- Alfa Pendular (AP) is an intercity high-speed service. It is the fastest service, whose speeds can reach 220 km/h. This service runs from Lisbon to either Porto, Braga or Guimarães (passing through Coimbra, Aveiro and Porto) or between Porto and Faro.
- Intercidades (IC) is an intercity fast long-distance service whose speeds can reach 200 km/h. All IC services (apart from the Beja Shuttle) run from Lisbon to either Porto, Braga, Guimarães, Guarda, Covilhã or Évora (with connection at Casa Branca to Beja), serving the majority of the Portuguese regions. Service to southern Portugal runs to cities including Tunes, Faro, and Albufeira.
- Inter-Regional (IR) is a medium distance service which stops only at the main stations. Runs mainly on the routes Porto-Viana do Castelo-Valença (Minho Line), Porto-Régua-Pocinho (Douro Line), Lisbon-Caldas da Rainha-Leiria-Coimbra (West Line) and Lisbon-Tomar (North Line). Services are operated by the same trains as Regional service.
- Regional (R) is CP's local service, stopping at all stations, out of the Lisbon and Porto suburban areas.
- Urbano (U) is the CP's urban service, in the regions of Lisbon and Porto and in the Coimbra-Figueira da Foz Line.

== Lines/Routes ==
The lines are no longer maintained by CP, due to EU regulations, so the infrastructure is now handled by the public company Infraestruturas de Portugal.

Line	Gauge	Status	Notes
Alentejo	Iberian	Partially Opened	No traffic between Beja and Ourique and freight only between Ourique and Funcheira
Alfarelos Branch	Iberian	current	
Algarve	Iberian	current	
Beira Alta	Iberian	current	Closed from April 2022 for a complete overhaul. Scheduled to reopen by the end of 2024, eventually reopened late 2025
Beira Baixa	Iberian	current	
Ramal de Braga	Iberian	current	
Ramal de Cáceres	Iberian	former	closed in 2012
Cascais	Iberian	current	
Cintura	Iberian	current	
Corgo	metre	former	closed in 1990 between Vila Real and Chaves; remaining section closed in 2009
Dão	metre	former	closed in 1989
Douro	Iberian	Partially Opened	closed in 1988 between Pocinho and Barca d'Alva
Ramal do Estádio Nacional	Iberian	former	closed in 1979
Évora	Iberian	current	closed in 1990 between Estremoz and Vila Viçosa; closed in 2009 between Évora and Estremoz
Évora–Elvas	Iberian	future	New line between Évora and Elvas (not a high speed line)
Ramal da Figueira da Foz	Iberian	former	closed in 2009
Guimarães	metre	former	closed in 1986 between Guimarães and Fafe; closed in 2001 between ISMAI and Trofa; converted to Iberian gauge between Trofa and Guimarães in 2004; converted to Porto Metro between Senhora da Hora and ISMAI in 2005
Guimarães	Iberian	current	
Linha de Leixões	Iberian	current	reopened commuter service from Campanhã to Leça do Balio in 2025
Leste	Iberian	current	passenger service restored in 2017
Lisbon–Madrid HSL	Iberian	future	
Ramal do Louriçal	Iberian	current	freight only
Ramal da Lousã	Iberian	former	closed in 2010 for construction of Metro Mondego; work halted due to lack of funds
Matinha	Iberian	Partially Opened	Closed between Sacavém and Beato in the mid 1990's to make way for Expo '98 grounds freight only
Minho	Iberian	Partially Opened	Closed in 1990 between Valença and Monção
Montemor	Iberian	former	closed in 1989
Montijo	Iberian	former	closed in 1989
Mora	Iberian	former	closed in 1990
Moura	Iberian	former	closed in 1990
Norte	Iberian	current	
Oeste	Iberian	current	
Portalegre	Iberian	former	closed in 1990
Póvoa	metre	former	Closed in 1995 between Póvoa de Varzim and Famalicão Porto (Trindade) - Póvoa de Varzim converted to Porto Metro between 2002 and 2006
Porto–Lisbon HSL	Iberian	future	
Porto-Vigo HSL	Iberian	future	
Ramal Neves Corvo	Iberian	current	freight only
Sabor	metre	former	closed in 1988
Sines	Iberian	current	freight only
Sintra	Iberian	current	
Sul	Iberian	current	
Tâmega	metre	former	Closed in stages between 1990 and 2009: Arco de Baúlhe - Amarante (1990) and Amarante - Livração (2009).
Ramal de Tomar	Iberian	current	
Tua	metre	former	Closed in stages between 1992 and 2019: Bragança - Mirandela (1992), Tua - Cachão (2008) and Cachão - Mirandela - Carvalhais (2019). Mirandela - Carvalhais section reopened between 1995 and 2019 as Metro de Mirandela
Vendas Novas	Iberian	current	freight only
Vouga	metre	Partially Opened	Viseu branch closed in 1990

== Rolling stock ==
=== Locomotives ===
Image	Class (Nickname)	In Service since	Numbers		Traction	Gauge	Max Speed	Services
Image	Class (Nickname)	In Service since	In Service	Total	Traction	Gauge	Max Speed	Services
	0180	1924	1	2	Steam	Iberian 1668 mm		Seasonal Heritage
	1150 (Sentinel)	1967	4	36	Diesel	Iberian 1668mm	56 km/h	Workshop Shunting
	1400 (English Electric)	1967	11	67	Diesel	Iberian 1668 mm	105 km/h	InterRegional Shunting Breakdown Train
	1550 (MLW)	1973	3	20	Diesel	Iberian 1668 mm	120 km/h	Breakdown Train
	2600 (Alstom)	1974	9	12	Electric	Iberian 1668 mm	160 km/h	InterRegional InterCidades*
	2620 (Alstom)	1987	3	9	Electric	Iberian 1668 mm	160 km/h	InterRegional InterCidades*
	5600	1993	19	24	Electric	Iberian 1668 mm	220 km/h	InterCidades
	E200	1911 - 1923	1	6	Steam	Meter 1000 mm	50 km/h	Seasonal Heritage
	9000	1975	2	3	Diesel	Meter 1000 mm	70 km/h	Seasonal Heritage
(*): Only in case of a CP 5600 failure

=== Multiple Units ===
Image	Class	Type	In Service since	Built in	Numbers		Traction	Gauge	Max Operational Speed	Services
Image	Class	Type	In Service since	Built in	In Service	Total	Traction	Gauge	Max Operational Speed	Services
	0350 (Allan)	1 Car DMU	2000	2000	5	18	Diesel	Iberian 1668 mm	100 km/h	Regional
	0450 (UDD)	2 Car DMU	1998	1998	19	19	Diesel	Iberian 1668 mm	120 km/h	Regional InterRegional
	592 (Camelas)	3 Car DMU	2011	1984 (Refurbished in 2001)	5	24	Diesel	Iberian 1668 mm	140 km/h	Regional InterRegional International (Celta)
	9630	2 Car DMU	1991	1991	7	7	Diesel	Meter 1000 mm	90 km/h	Regional
	2240	3 Car EMU	2004	2003	55	57	Electric	Iberian 1668 mm	120 km/h	Urban Regional InterRegional
	2300	4 Car EMU	1992	1992	42	42	Electric	Iberian 1668 mm	120 km/h	Urban
	2400	4 Car EMU	1997	1997	14	14	Electric	Iberian 1668 mm	120 km/h	Urban
	3150	3 Car EMU	1998	1998	13	13	Electric	Iberian 1668 mm	90 km/h	Urban
	3250	4 Car EMU	1998	1998	18	21	Electric	Iberian 1668 mm	90 km/h	Urban
	3400	4 Car EMU	2002	2002	34	34	Electric	Iberian 1668 mm	140 km/h	Urban
	3500	4 Car 2-floor EMU	1999	1999	12	12	Electric	Iberian 1668 mm	140 km/h	Urban
	4000	6 Car High Speed EMU	1999 (Refurbished in 2017)	1998	9	10	Electric	Iberian 1668 mm	220 km/h	Alfa Pendular

=== Passenger Cars ===
Image	Name	In Service since	Numbers		Gauge	Max Speed	Services	Notes
Image	Name	In Service since	In service	Total	Gauge	Max Speed	Services	Notes
Stainless Steel Cars with A/C
	Corail	1985	58	58	Iberian 1668 mm	200 km/h	InterCidades	First used on the now-extinct "classic" Alfa service
	Sorefame Modernizada	1993-1996	45	45	Iberian 1668 mm	200 km/h	InterCidades	Modernized classic Sorefame cars for InterCidades
Mild Steel Cars with A/C
	Arco	2021	17	36	Iberian 1668 mm	200 km/h	InterRegional InterCidades	Purchased from Renfe in 2020 Refurbished at Guifões Workshop 2021-Present
	9000	N/A	0	4	Iberian 1668 mm	160 km/h	Not in Service	Purchased from Renfe in 2020
	Gran Confort	N/A	0	5	Iberian 1668 mm	160 km/h	Not in Service	Purchased from Renfe in 2020
	Corail	N/A	0	5	Iberian 1668 mm	160 km/h	Not in Service	Couchette cars Purchased from Renfe in 2020
Stainless Steel Cars without A/C
	Sorefame Classic	1963-1984	9	74	Iberian 1668 mm	140 km/h	Regional InterRegional	Most withdrawn from service or modernized for InterCidades
Mild Steel Cars without A/C
	Schindler	1948–1949	17	19	Iberian 1668 mm	120 km/h	Regional InterRegional	Out of service between 1996 and 2017. Back in service from 2017 onwards.
	Napolitanas	1931	3	5	Meter 1000 mm		Seasonal Heritage	Vouga Heritage Train
Wooden Cars (Heritage)
	Broad Gauge Cars	-	5	5	Iberian 1668 mm		Seasonal Heritage	Douro Valley Line Heritage Train
	Narrow Gauge Cars	-	3	5	Meter 1000 mm		Seasonal Heritage	Vouga Line Heritage Train

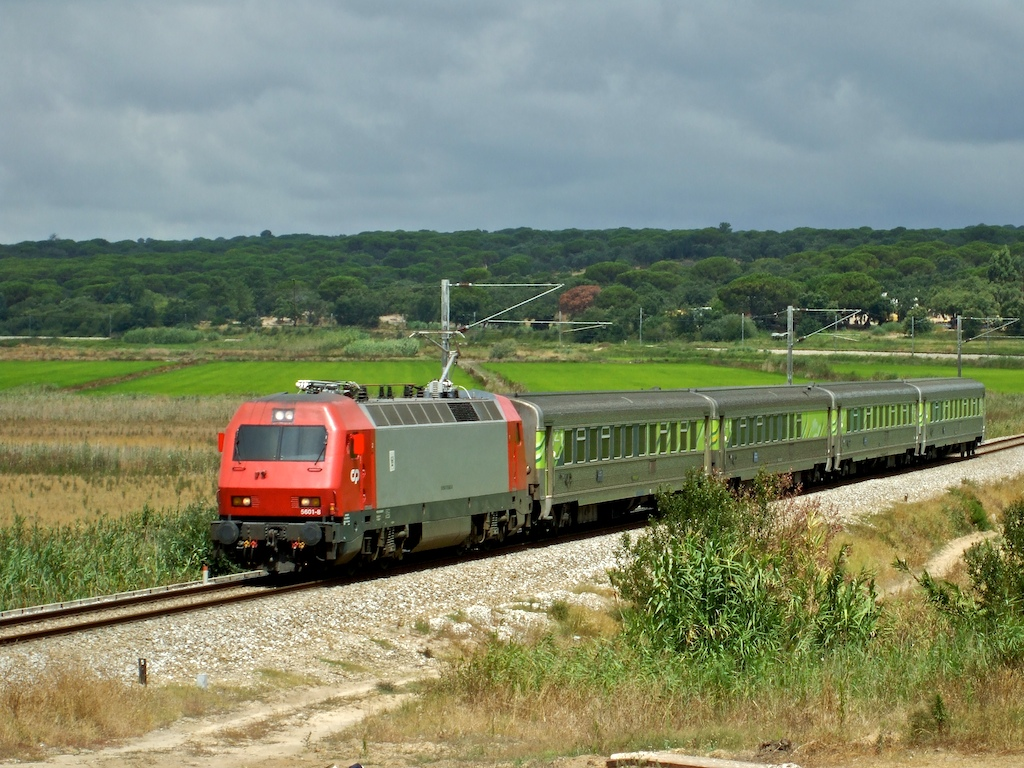
CP's 5600 Series (19 units) are responsible for all Intercity services. Four sold and five leased to Medway for freight use. One is here seen on the Linha do Sul, near Alcácer do Sal.

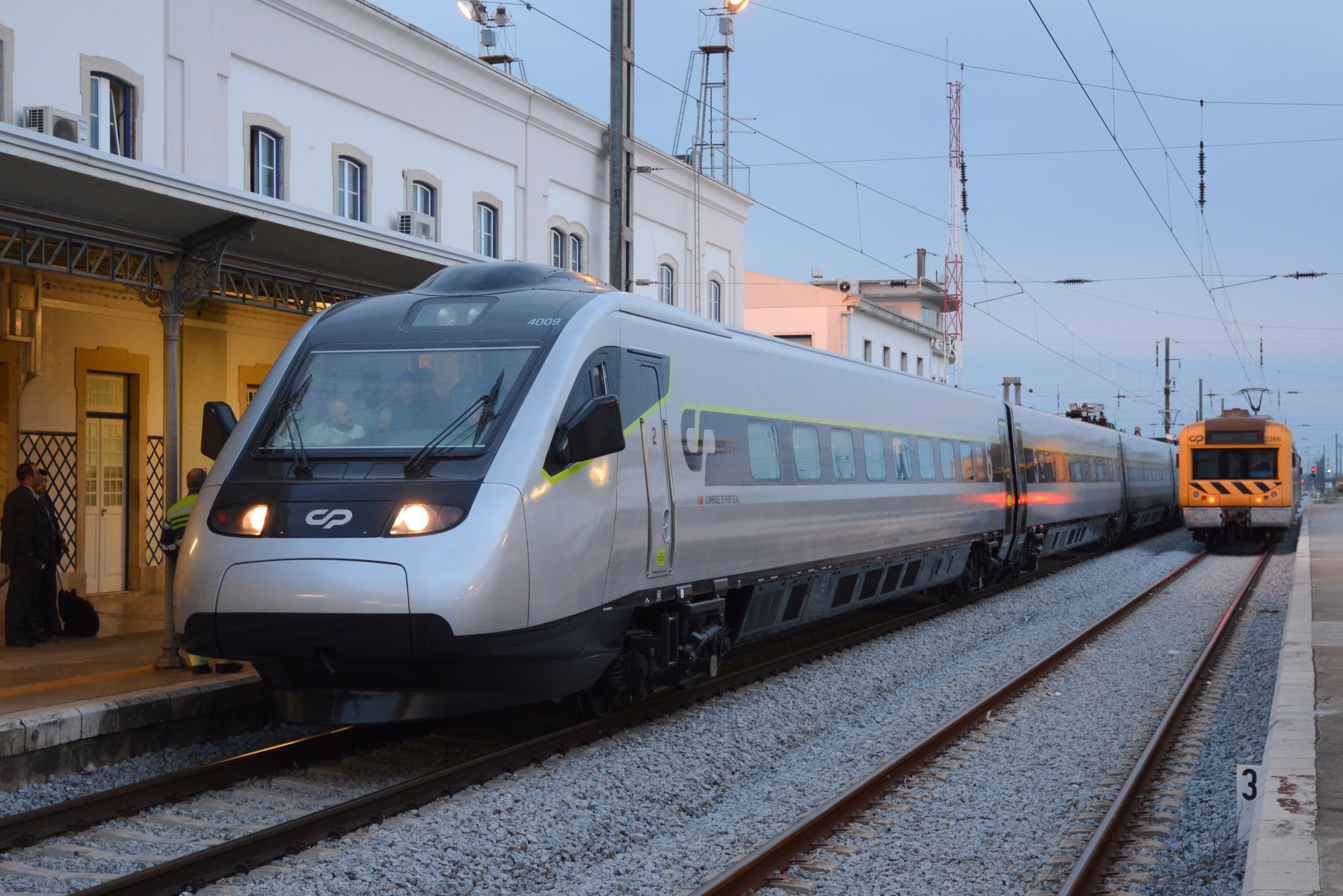
CP's 4000 Series work all Alfa Pendular services. Here on is seen at Entroncamento on the Linha do Norte.

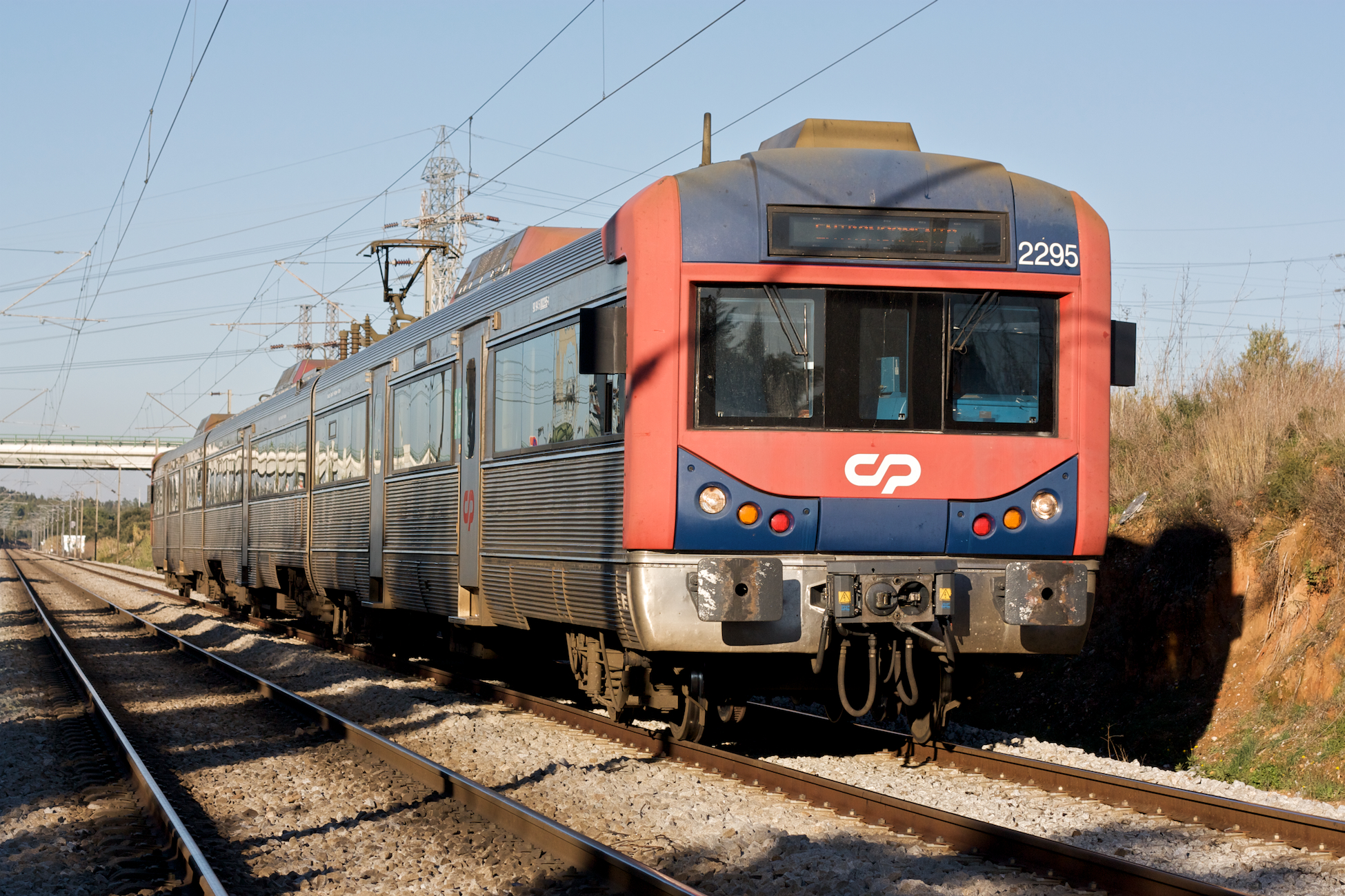
CP's 2240 Series are responsible for Urban (Lisbon's Sado Line and the Coimbra to Figueira da Foz urban service), Regional and Inter-Regional services. Unit 2295 is here seen with a now outdated red color scheme, on the Linha do Norte, near Entroncamento.

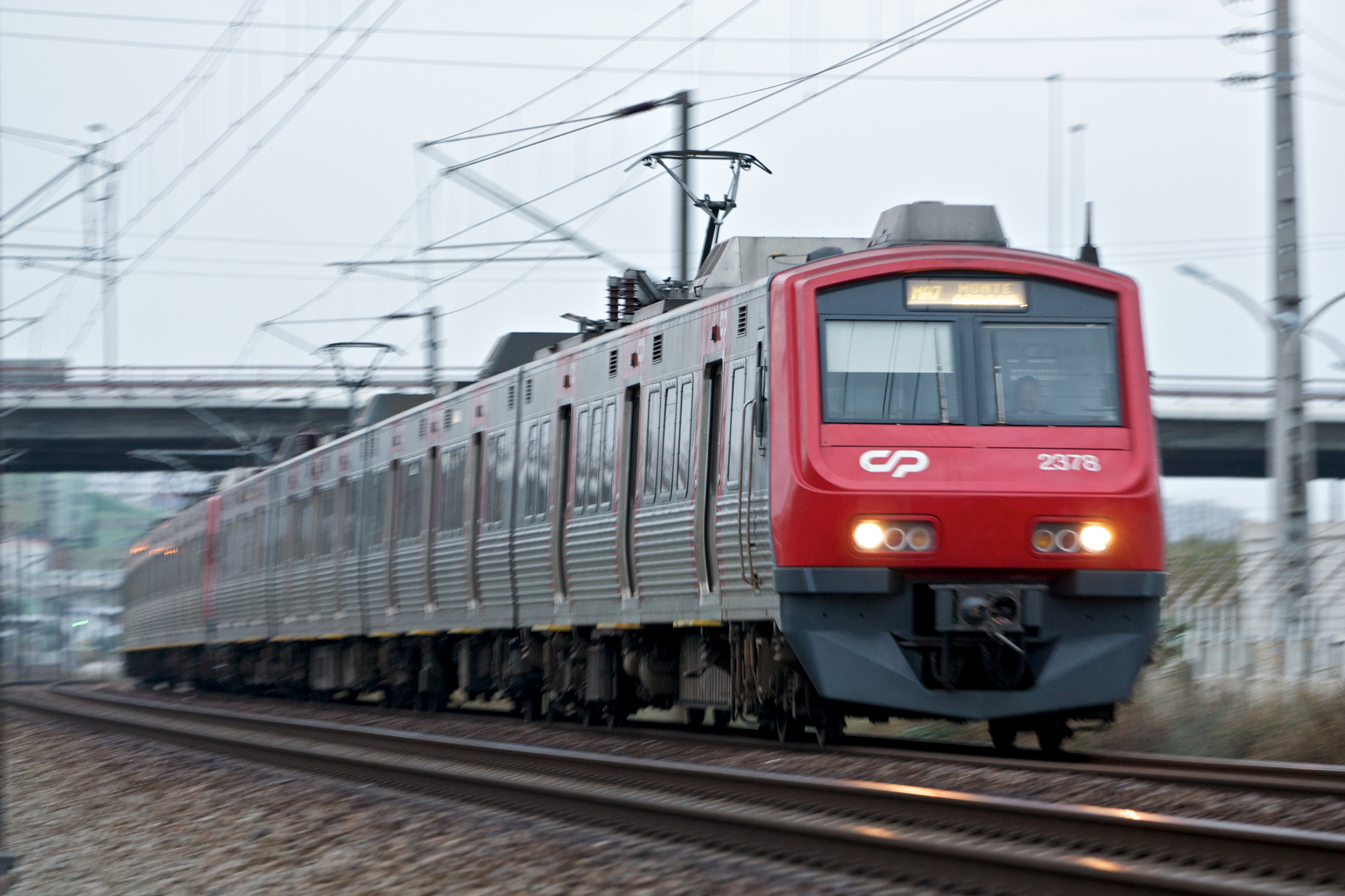
Most of Lisbon's suburban trains (except the Cascais Line services), are in the hands of CP's 2300/2400 Series. Two are here seen on the Linha do Norte, near Santa Iria de Azoia.

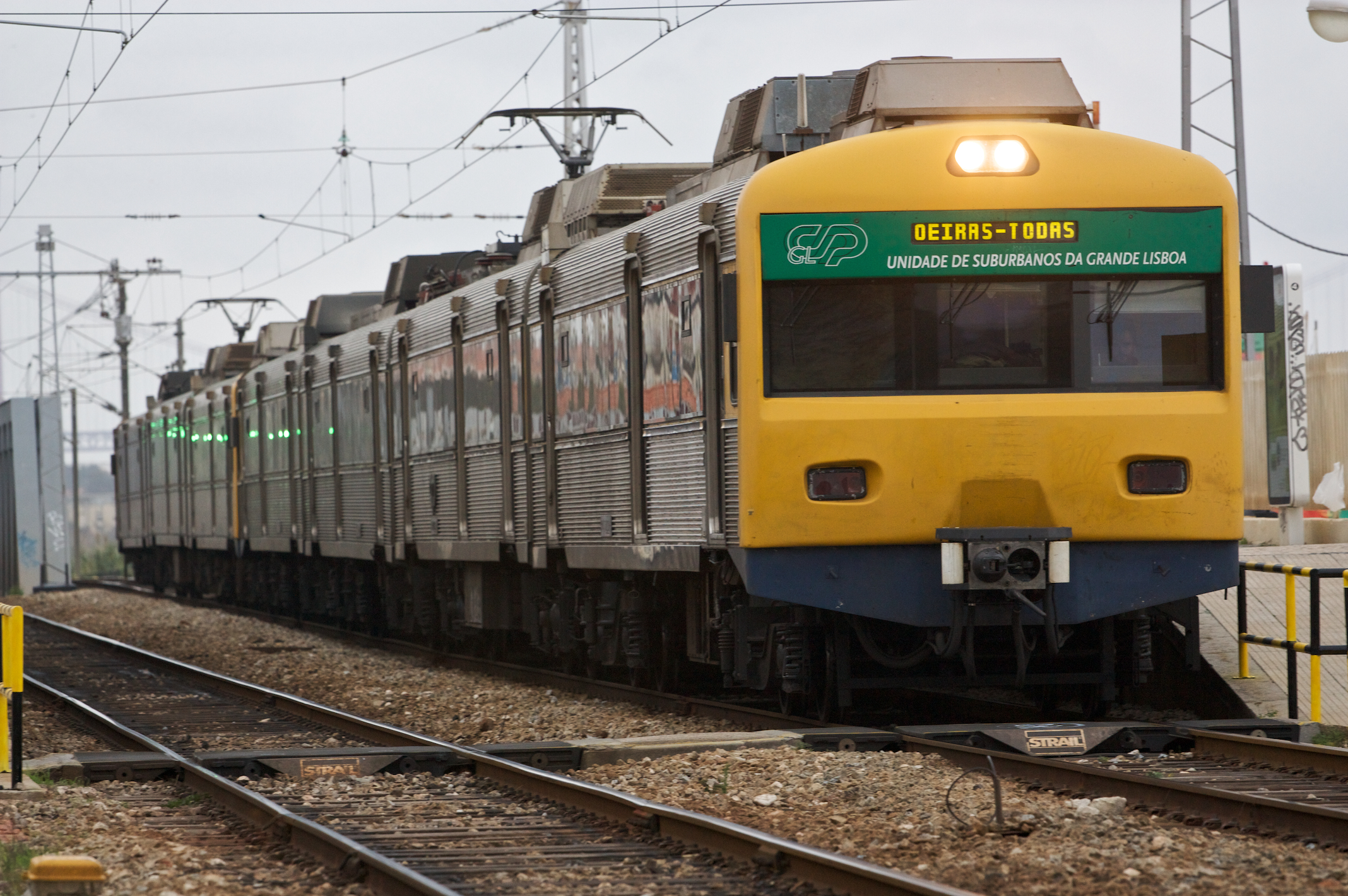
All Linha de Cascais urban trains are in the hands of CP's 3150/3250 Series.Two are here seen near Cruz Quebrada.

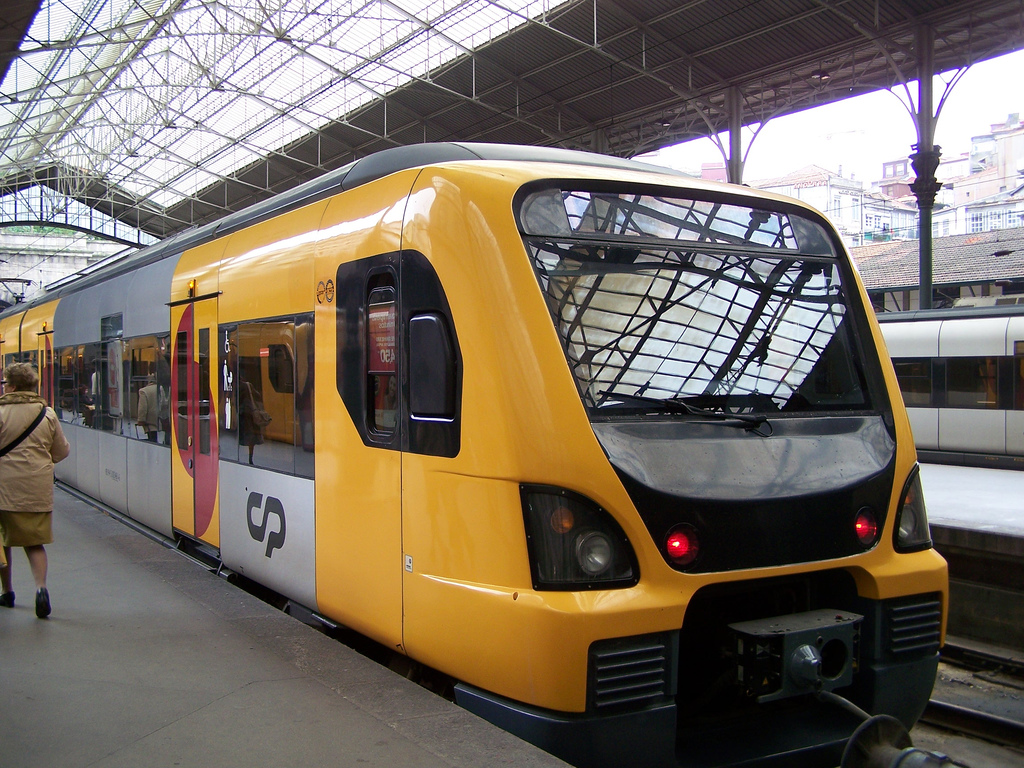
CP's 3400 are responsible for all Porto urban services. One is here seen at São Bento station.

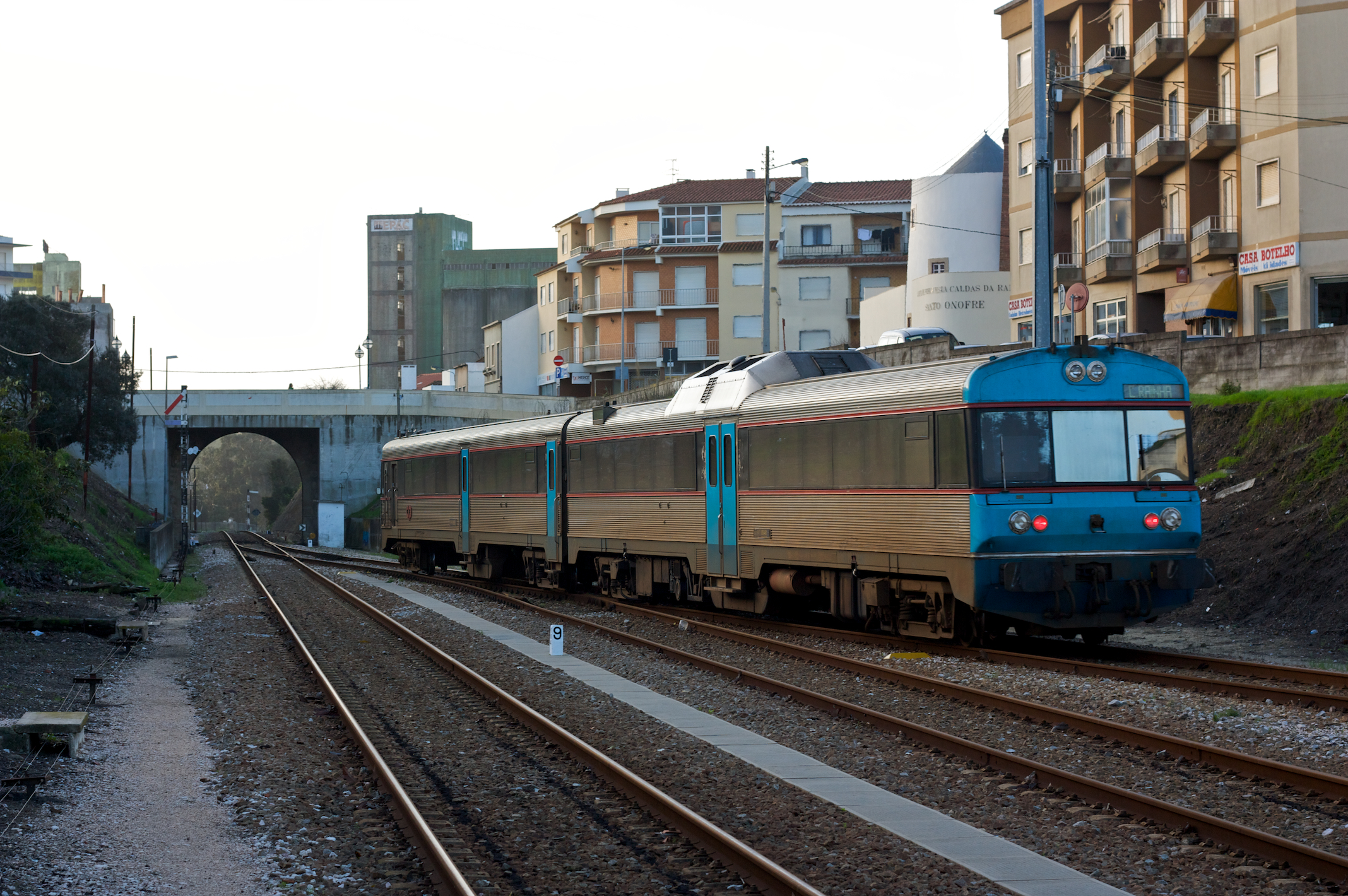
CP's 0450 Series are responsible for some Regional and Inter-Regional services. They are also in charge of the Intercity shuttle service between Casa Branca and Beja. One is here seen at Caldas da Rainha.

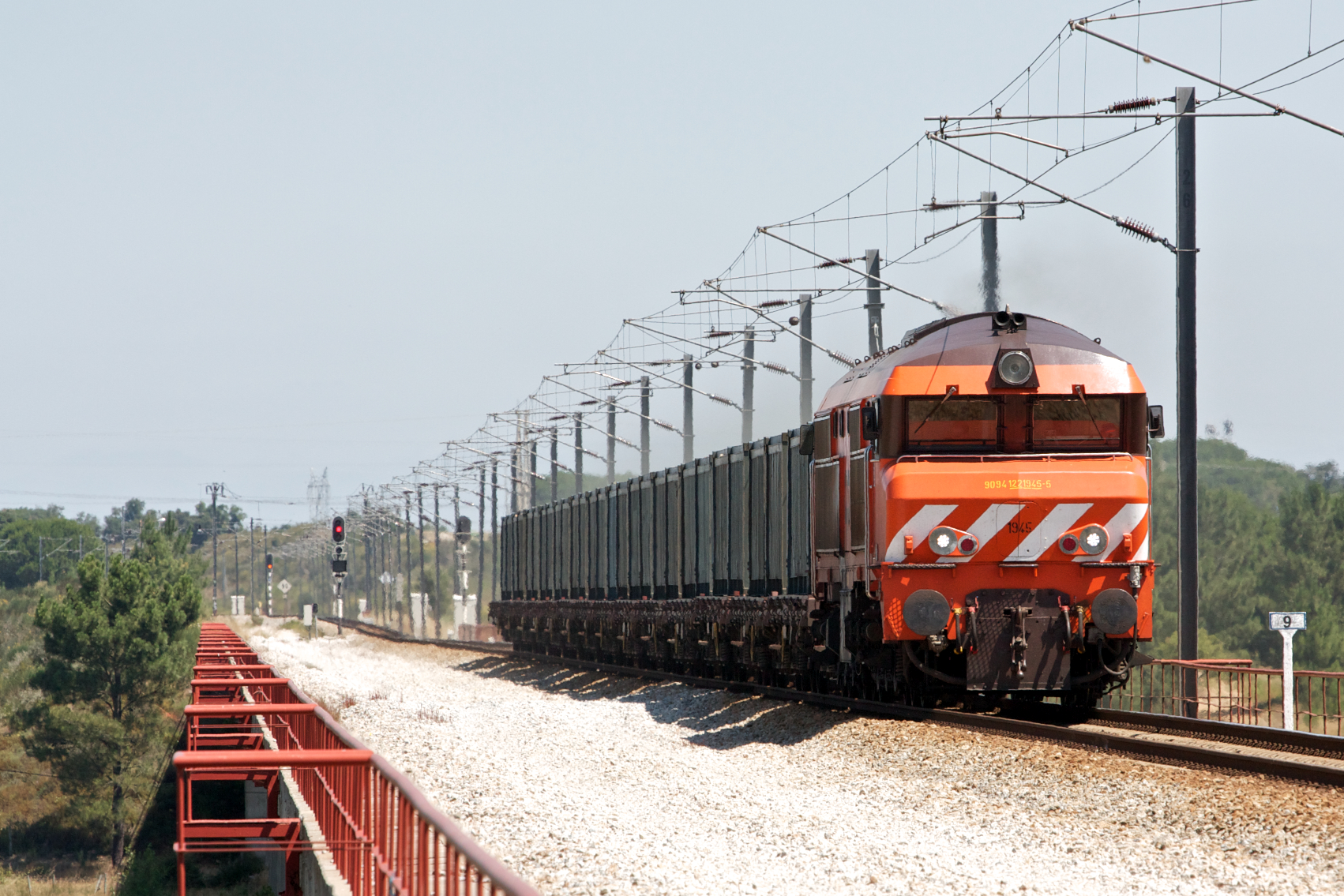
CP's 1900/1930 Series were responsible for passenger (1930 only) and freight (both) services. Several sold to Medway and Ferrocentral (Argentina). All of CP units have been withdrawn from service.

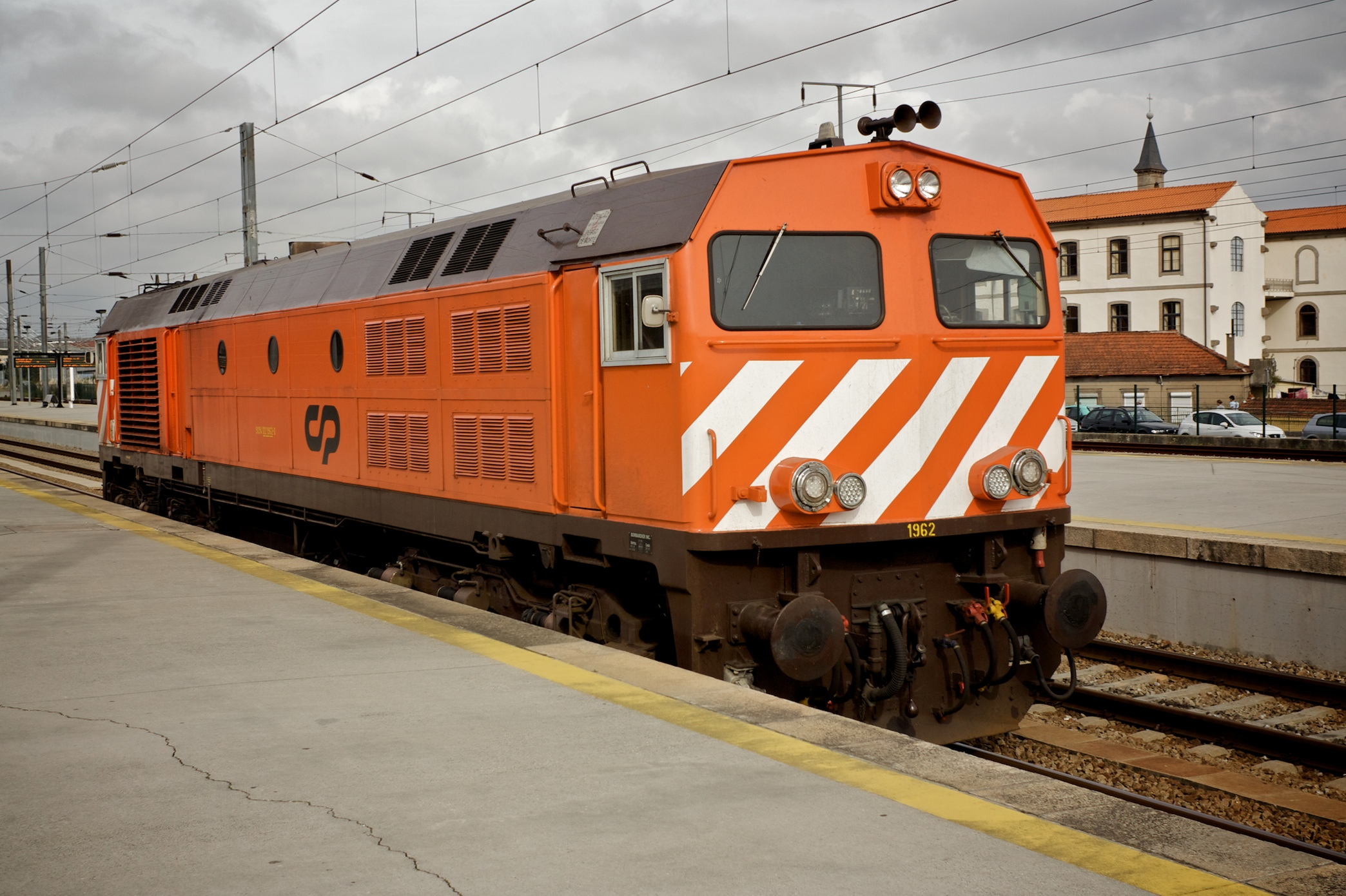
CP's 1960 Series were the most powerful diesel locos in Portugal. They hauled both passenger (until the Beira Alta Line was electrified) and freight trains. Some sold to Medway. All of CP units have been withdrawn from service. One is here seen at Porto Campanhã.

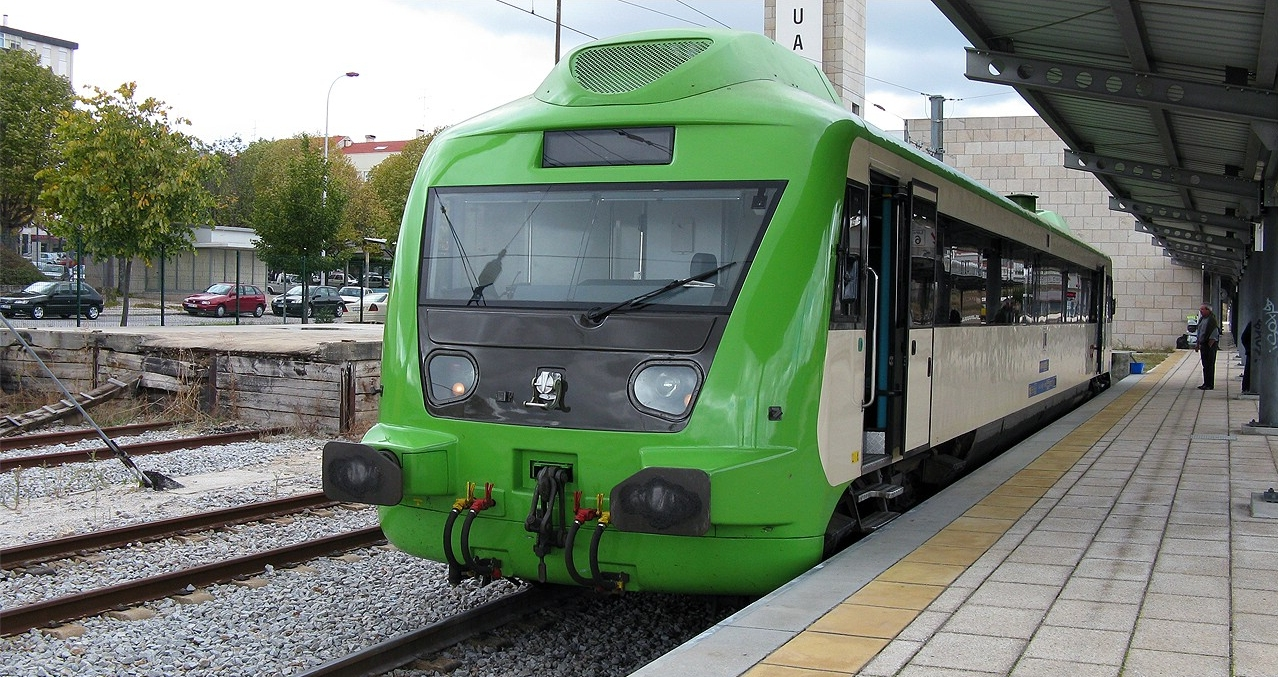
CP's 0350 Series were once mainly used for Regional on unelectrified rural lines. As of 2021 only 3 remain in service. One is here seen at Guarda.

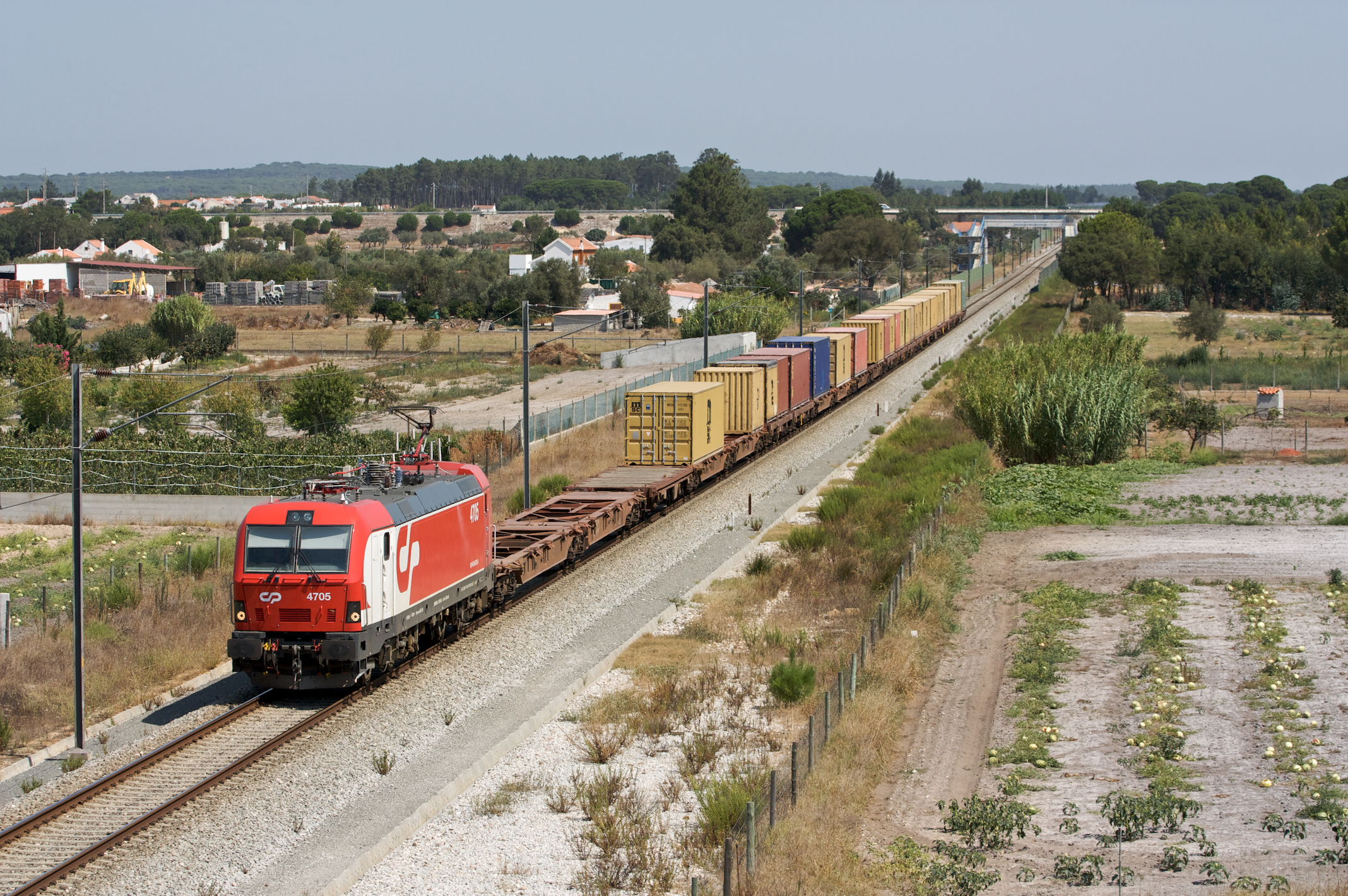
CP's 4700 Series were the backbone of their freight business. All 25 units were sold to Medway.

== Major stations ==
=== Lisbon ===
- Cais do Sodré - for local trains from Lisbon to Cascais. Portugal's busiest interchange station (train/ferry/metro/tram/bus)
- Oriente - for trains to the north and to the Algarve
- Rossio - for local trains to Sintra
- Santa Apolónia - terminus station, for trains to the north and to Spain

=== Porto ===
- Campanhã - Porto's main station, including use by Alfa Pendular high speed trains
- São Bento - city centre terminus, for local services, northbound and Douro line trains

=== Other ===
- Braga
- Faro
- Guimarães

== Accidents and incidents ==
On 21 January 2013, two trains crashed on the Portuguese Northern Line in Alfarelos. Twenty-five people were injured and the line was closed for three days.

On 31 July 2020, an Alfa Pendular Train collided with a track maintenance vehicle at Soure, Portugal. Two people were killed and 43 were injured, three seriously.

== See also ==
- History of rail transport in Portugal
- Iberian gauge
- Narrow gauge railways in Portugal
- National Railway Museum (Portugal)
- Rail transport in Portugal
- High-speed rail in Portugal
- CP Urban Services, the commuter railways ran by CP in Lisbon, Porto, and Coimbra.
