= Alfarelos train crash =

2013 railway incident in Portugal

Details
- Date: 21 January 2013; 21:15
- Location: Alfarelos, Soure, Coimbra
- Country: Portugal
- Line: Linha do Norte
- Operator: Caminhos-de-Ferro Portugueses
- Incident type: Rear collision

Statistics
- Trains: 2
- Passengers: 82
- Deaths: 0
- Injured: 25
Linha do Norte route map

The Alfarelos train crash occurred on 21 January 2013 at the Alfarelos station, in the Portuguese Northern Line. Two trains crashed, after both passed signals at danger, wounding 25 people and halting the Northern Line for three days.

== Context ==
On the day of the accident, services were operating as usual in the Northern Line. At 19:30, an InterCity train left Lisbon Santa Apolónia towards Porto Campanhã.

About half an hour later, at 19:55, a train left Entroncamento, 106 kilometres (66 mi) away from Santa Apolónia, making the regional service towards Coimbra, where it was scheduled to arrive at 21:51.

Both trains were expected to meet at around 21:17 in Alfarelos, where the InterCity would overtake the regional.

== Crash ==
The inquiry commission led by CP and REFER collected information about the events that led to the collision. According to their report, shortly before arriving at Alfarelos, the regional train encountered a caution signal (solid yellow), meaning that it would find a red signal at Alfarelos. As the driver slowed down the train, so that it would stop before the red signal, it started slipping on the rails.

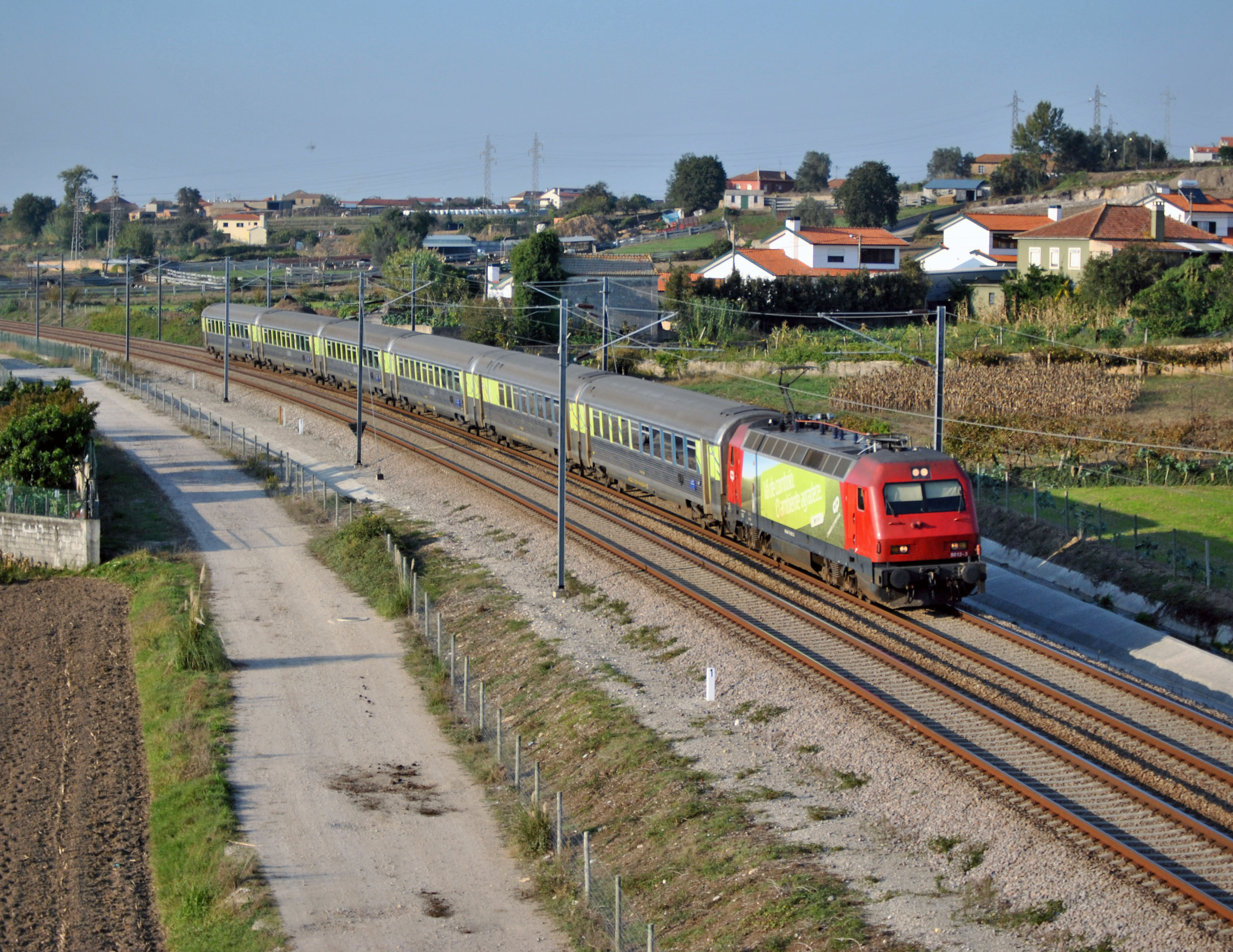
CP 5613 pulling a train. This CP Class 5600 locomotive was pulling the InterCity train involved in the crash, and suffered heavy damage.

The driver was not able to stop the train on time. 230 metres (0.14 mi) before the signal, with the train travelling at 36 kilometres per hour (22 mph), CONVEL triggered the emergency brakes. This was not enough to stop the train which passed the signal at danger at a speed of 34.5 kilometres per hour (21.4 mph) and stopped 269 metres (0.167 mi) after the signal.

Following the rules for this type of incident, the driver contacted the REFER Lisbon Operational Command Center (CCO Lisboa), awaiting instructions on how to proceed. The train could either be told to go back to the signal, or to continue ahead.

At the same time, the InterCity train passed through the same caution signal at 130.5 kilometres per hour (81.1 mph), and faced similar problems. After braking for 500 metres (0.31 mi), the train speed was still 90 kilometres per hour (56 mph), which prompted the driver to use the sander. This train was also unable to stop on time, and passed the signal at danger with a speed of 58.5 kilometres per hour (36.4 mph), moment at which CONVEL triggered the emergency brakes. Shortly after, at 21:15, this train collided with the regional train, at 42 kilometres per hour (26 mph), destroying the last car and damaging other two.

== Aftermath ==
Despite the collision and the destruction, which included graphic photos of a rail car torn apart, with the InterCity going through it "like it were a tunnel", there were no fatalities: the three last cars, which suffered most of the damage, had no passengers. The driver of the InterCity locomotive survived by getting down on the floor.

The regional train would normally be one multiple unit with three cars (CP Class 2240), but, on the night of the accident, this train had two multiple units, 2257 and 2294, comprising six cars.

In the aftermath of the accident, the track was not used for several days, as works were in progress to remove the debris and to repair the infrastructure, and authorities carried on investigations.

A preliminary inquiry found no explanation for the accident, but ruled out human error from the drivers, and malfunctions in the signaling system. According to the inquiry, on both cases, the brakes were applied in a way that would have stopped the trains before the red signal under normal operating conditions.

The inquiry commission concluded that there was lack of adhesion between the wheels and the rails. The commission suggested a speed limitation of 30 kilometres per hour (19 mph) in the accident area.
