= 1550 class =

1550 class or Class 1550 may refer to:

- CP Class 1550, diesel-electric locomotives
- Queensland Railways 1550 class, diesel-electric locomotives
