= CP Class 5600 =

CP Class LE 5600
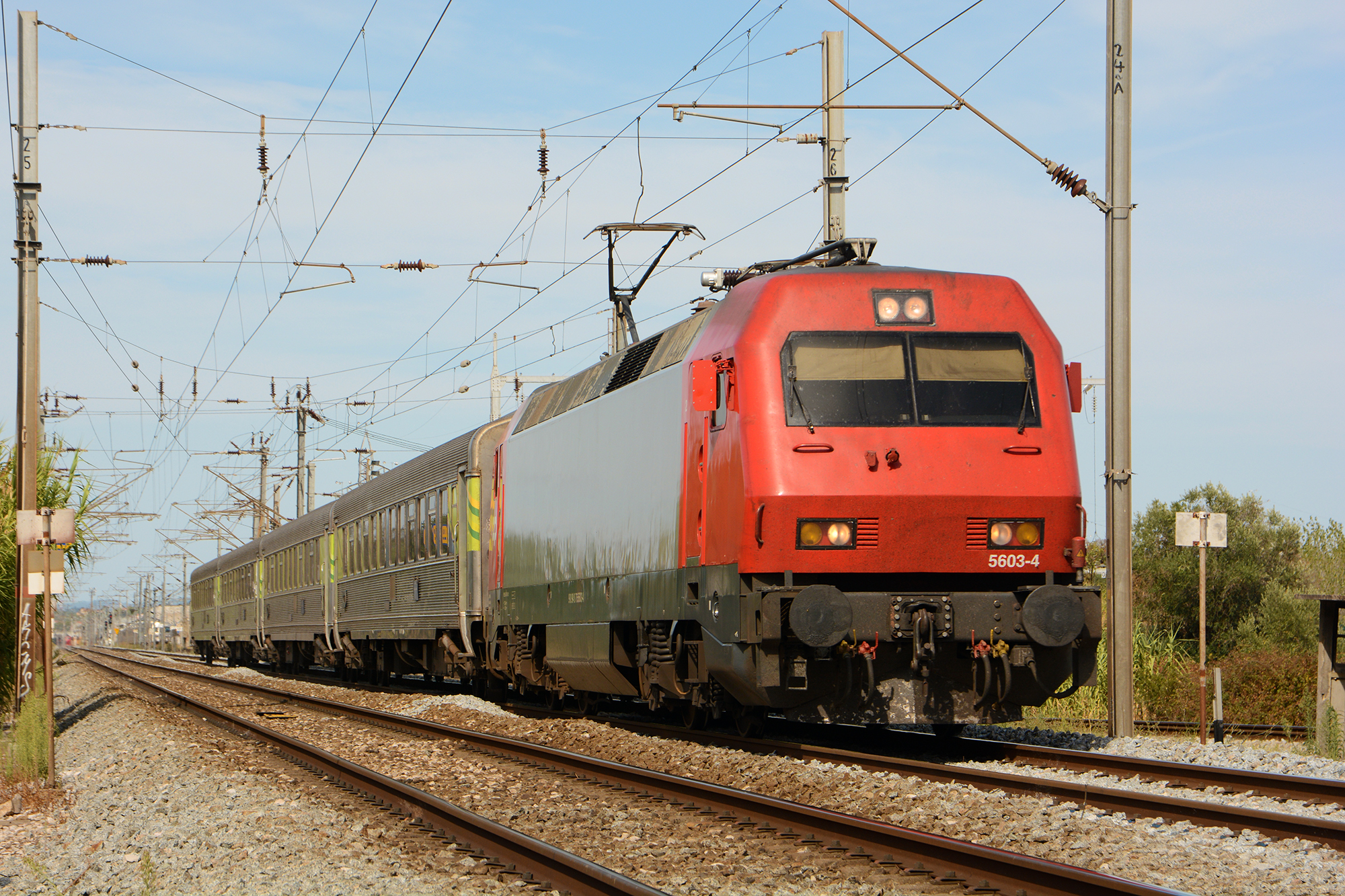
- The 5603 on a passenger train.
Type and origin
- Power type: Electric
- Builder: Siemens / Sorefame
- Build date: 1993-1995
- Total produced: 30
Specifications
- Configuration
  - UIC: Bo′Bo′
- Gauge: 1,668 mm (5 ft 5 21/32 in)
- Wheelbase: 10,500 mm (34 ft 5 3/8 in)
- Length: 19,580 mm (64 ft 2 7/8 in)
- Loco weight: 86 t (85 long tons; 95 short tons)
- Electric system/s: 25 kV 50 Hz AC Catenary
- Current pickup: Pantograph
Performance figures
- Maximum speed: 220 km/h (140 mph)
- Power output: 5,600 kW (7,500 hp)
- Tractive effort: 300 kN (67,000 lb_{f})
Career
- Current owner: Comboios de Portugal Medway
- Disposition: 28 in service, 1 being rebuilt, 1 destroyed by collision

Class 5600 are a series of electric locomotives built by Siemens in association with Sorefame of Portugal for Comboios de Portugal, the state owned railway company of Portugal.

== Overview ==
The 5600 locomotives predate the EuroSprinter family of modular locomotives built by Siemens for European railway companies, but have much in common with the later machines. Externally the locomotives are identical to Spain's Class 252 which were built at the same time, albeit without DC capability.

== Accidents ==
Of the 30 locomotives that were originally bought, 5624 was severely damaged in an accident in 2003, and 5613 was also damaged in the Alfarelos train crash.

== See also ==
- EuroSprinter
- Sorefame (Portuguese), Sociedades Reunidas de Fabricações Metálicas
- Renfe Class 252 Similar locomotives built from 1991-1996 for the Spanish Railways
- OSE Class 120 similar locomotives build by KraussMaffei-Siemens for Hellenic Railways Organization in 1997-2005, Operating on 25kV 50Hz AC
