= Soure train crash =

2020 railway incident in Portugal

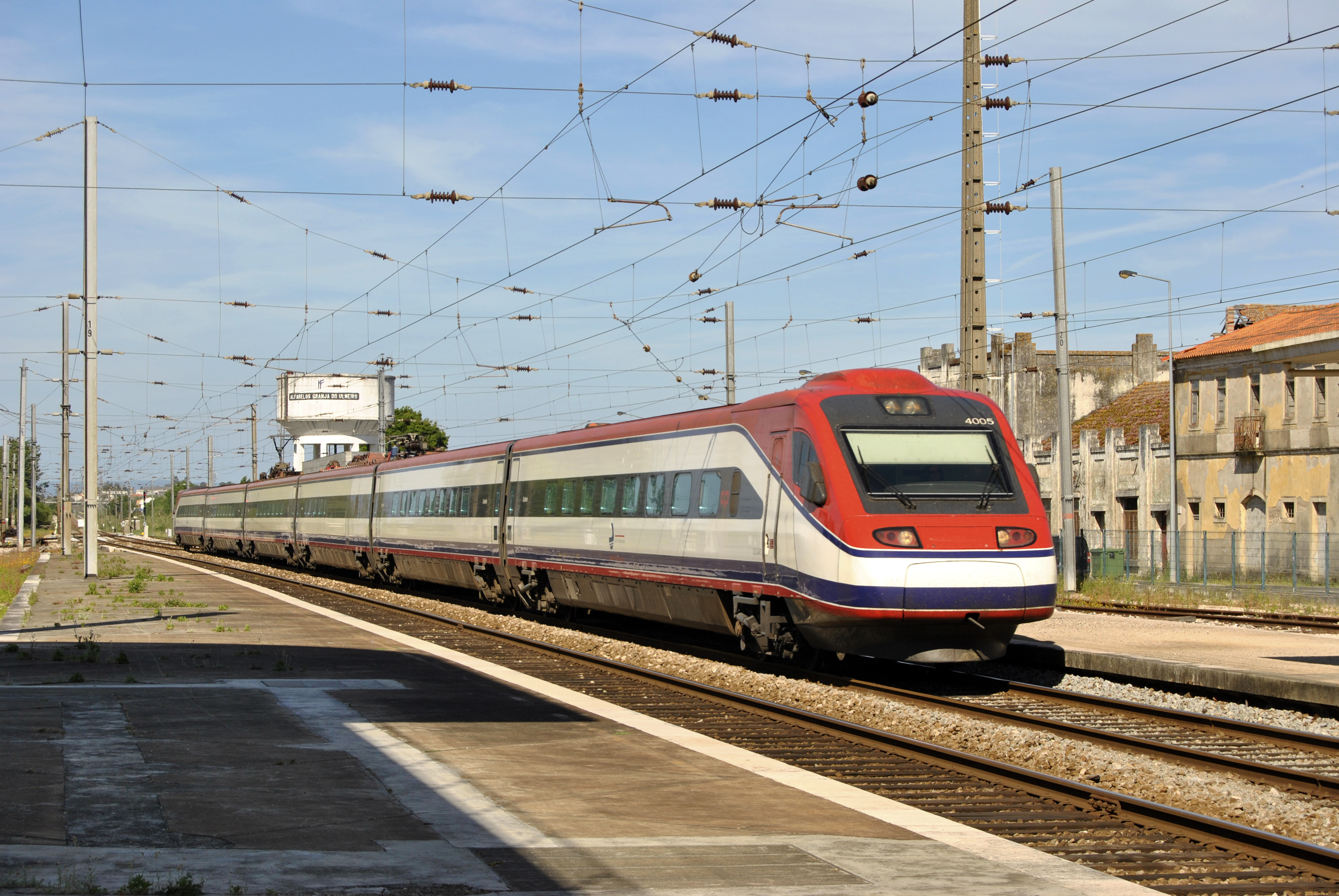
- Unit 4005, the train involved in the accident

Details
- Date: 31 July 2020; 15:26
- Location: Soure
- Coordinates: 40°03′28″N 8°38′18″W
- Country: Portugal
- Line: Linha do Norte
- Operator: Comboios de Portugal / Infraestruturas de Portugal
- Service: Lisbon - Braga
- Incident type: Collision
- Cause: Human error (SPAD)

Statistics
- Trains: 2
- Passengers: 212
- Crew: 2 (VCC) + 2 (passenger train)
- Deaths: 2 (in the VCC)
- Injured: 44

The Soure train crash occurred on 31 July 2020 when a high-speed passenger train collided with a track maintenance vehicle at Soure, Portugal. Two people were killed and 44 were injured, three seriously.

== Accident ==
Maintenance vehicle (Portuguese: Veículo de Conservação de Catenária - VCC) No. 105, belonging to Infraestruturas de Portugal, was returning from Entroncamento, where it had undergone repairs, to its depot at Mangualde with two crew members on board. Alfa Pendular 4005 was conducting the 14:00 express service from Lisbon to Braga, calling at Coimbra and Porto. With both trains travelling in the same direction, the maintenance vehicle was diverted into a siding at Soure station, to allow the express to overtake it.

As the express train approached Soure, the signals on the main line turned green, to give it a clear run. Because of the confusing placement of the signals, the crew of the maintenance vehicle probably mistook the green signal meant for the Alfa Pendular train as applying to the siding they were stopped at, and the vehicle resumed its course at 15:25. As they rejoined the main line, the signal automatically changed to red. The drivers of the express train saw the red signal and the maintenance vehicle, and applied maximum braking, but with only 12 seconds warning they ran into the back of the maintenance vehicle at a speed of around 155 km/h.

The first two carriages were derailed and the maintenance vehicle was dragged for some 500 meters, after which both vehicles came to a halt. The two crew members aboard the maintenance vehicle were killed, and 44 people on the express train were injured, three seriously: one of the drivers and two passengers in the leading car. The Alfa Pendular train was severely damaged and VCC No. 105 was destroyed.

The alert was raised within two minutes, and fire brigades from surrounding cities responded. The rescue operations were backed by 225 first responders, 85 emergency vehicles and 2 helicopters. A field hospital was established at the scene.

The Linha do Norte was closed between Pombal and Coimbra, and Comboios de Portugal organized a rail replacement bus service. Circulation on the southbound track resumed at 01:45 on the 2nd of August, 2020, with heavy speed restrictions. At 09:00 of the same day, the northbound track was reopened.

== Investigation and aftermath ==
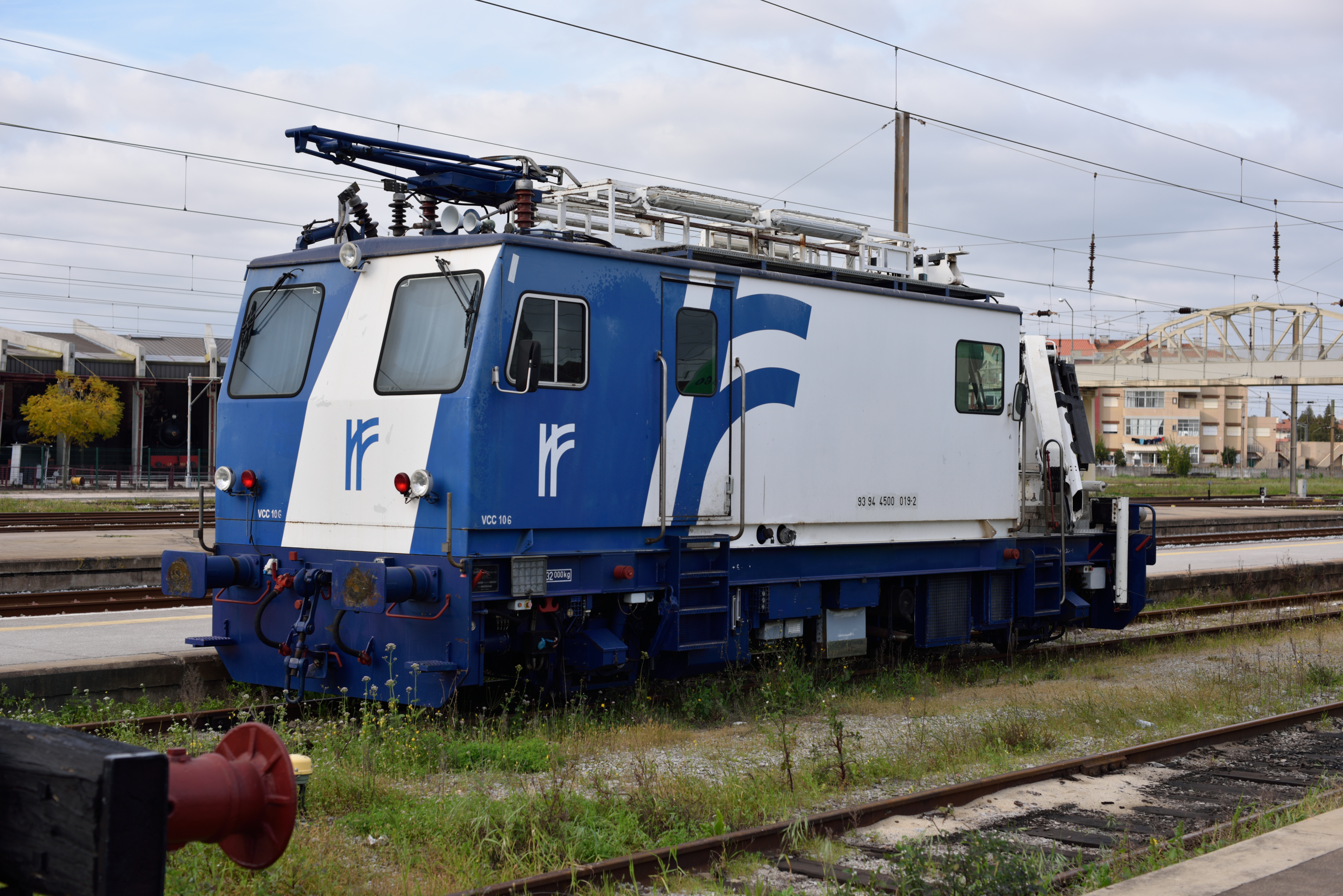
VCC No. 106, similar to that involved in the accident.

The Aviation Accidents Prevention and Investigation Department (GPIAAF) investigated the accident. Its final report was released on 29 September 2021.

The absence of automatic train protection (ATP) in maintenance vehicles was scrutinized. It came to light that after two events, in 2016 and 2018, where such vehicles passed signals at danger, GPIAAF recommended that IP reassess the possibility of equipping these vehicles with ATP and act to ensure train driving qualifications of their maintenance staff. IP agreed to install ATP, but this was met with difficulties in sourcing CONVEL-compatible equipment from Bombardier.

While the immediate cause was human error — the driver passing the signal at danger — five other causal factors were identified, including the absence of ATP on the maintenance vehicle. Its incursion into the reserved block was, however, detected by the track circuit and signals were updated accordingly, but the passenger train had already passed the previous signal and balise, and proceeded at top speed expecting a clear track ahead.
