= CP Class 2240 =

Class of Portuguese electric train

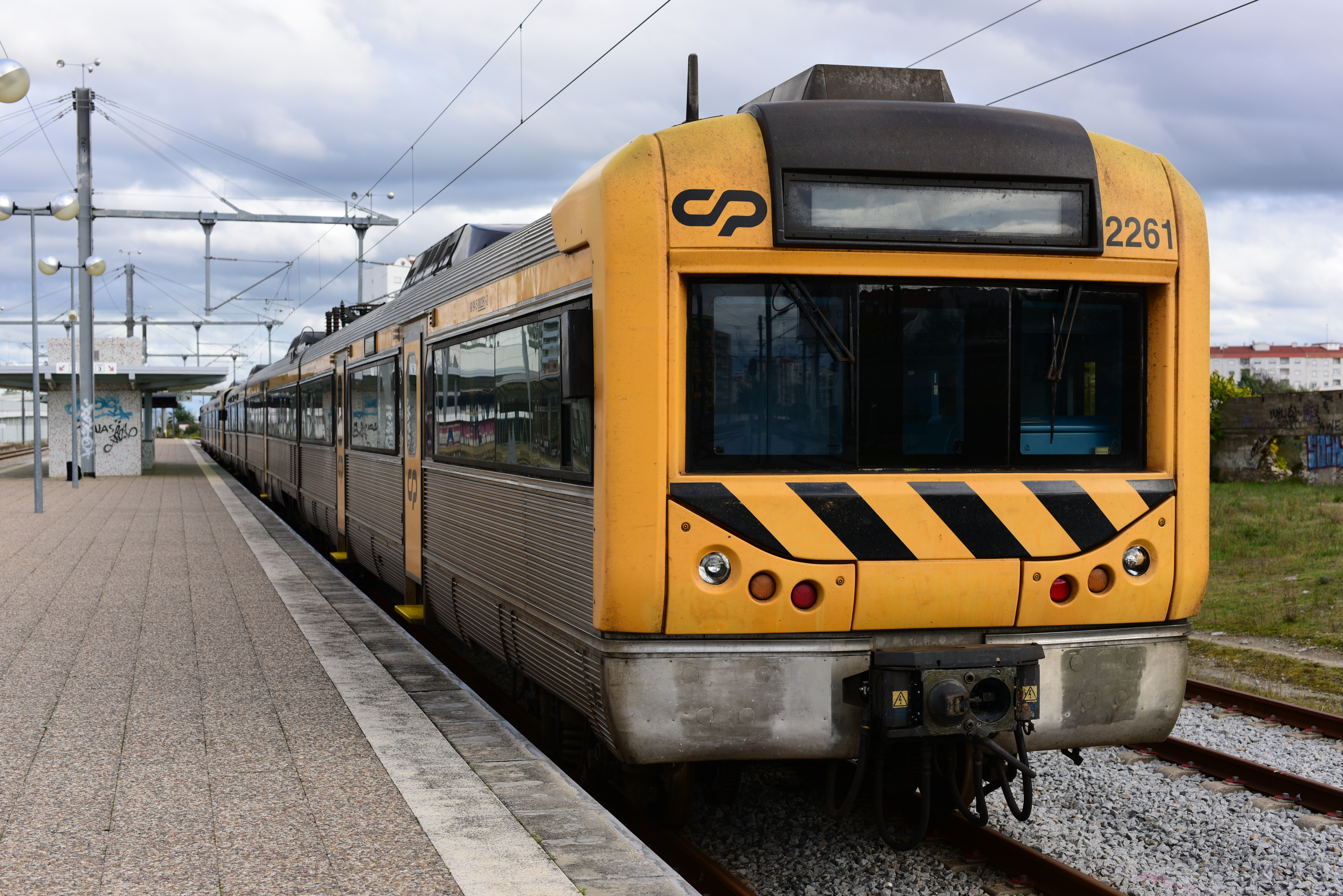
CP Class 2240 performing a Regional service at Castelo Branco station.

The CP 2240-class is an electric multiple unit used by the national train operator Comboios de Portugal. Each EMU features 3 cars, with the ends being driving trailers, and the middle being a power car (which houses the traction motors).

The units were assembled between 2003 and 2005, by Alstom, reusing the old Sorefame body shells belonging to the 2100, 2150 and 2200-class EMU's, to keep cost down and avoid fully scrapping old rolling stock. The bogies were custom-built with new Alstom traction motors, and are in the 1668mm Iberian gauge.

They are able to operate in multiple configuration with up to 3 units, for a total of 9 passenger cars.

== Statistics Sheet ==
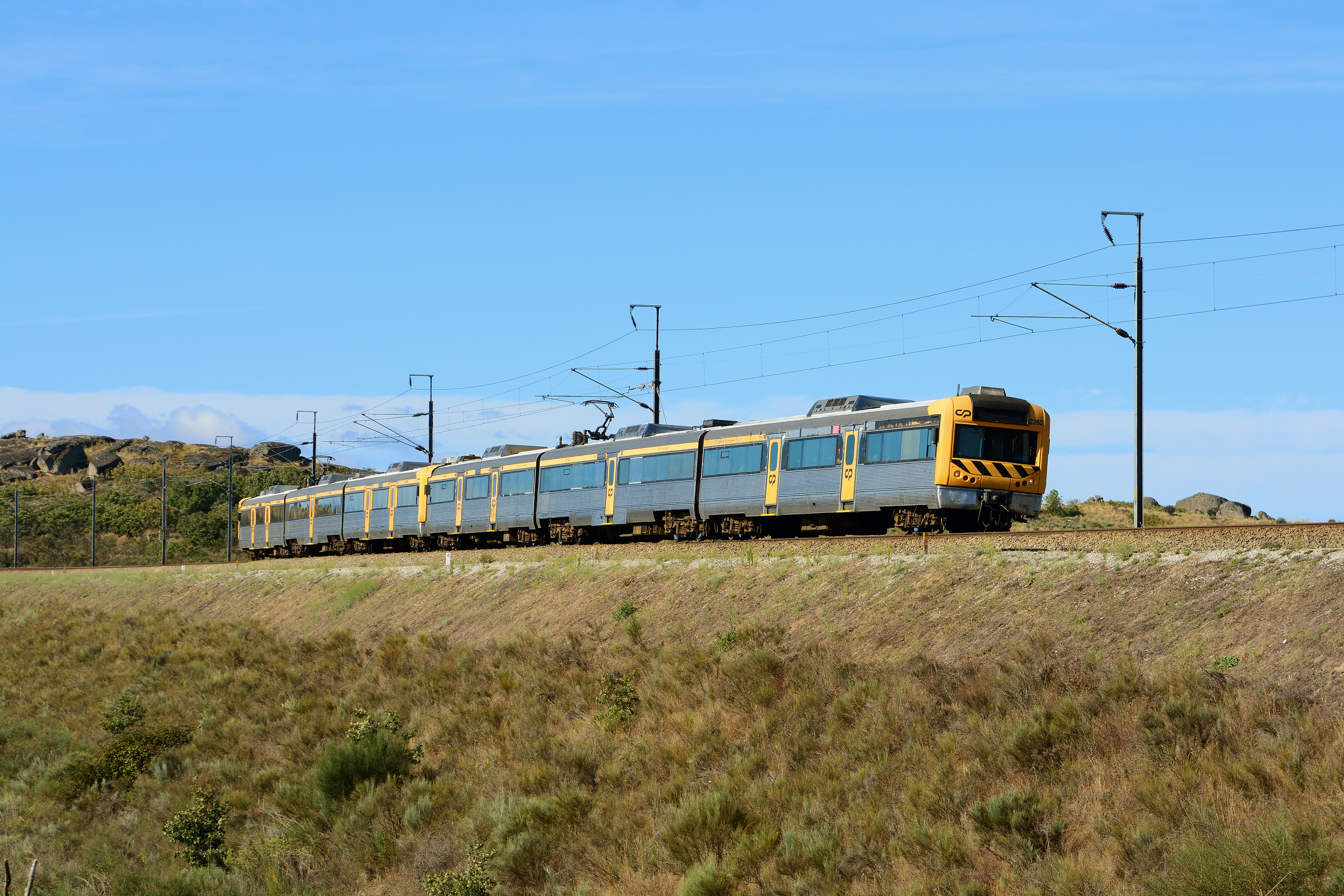
Two coupled 2240-class perform Regional 5402 from Guarda to Coimbra.

=== Manufacturers ===
- Body: Sorefame
- Electrical Equipment and Interior: Alstom
- Propulsion: Alstom
- Main Transformer: Pauwels
- Pantograph: Schunk
- Pneumatic Brakes: Knorr-Bremse
- CCTV System: Petards Group PLC

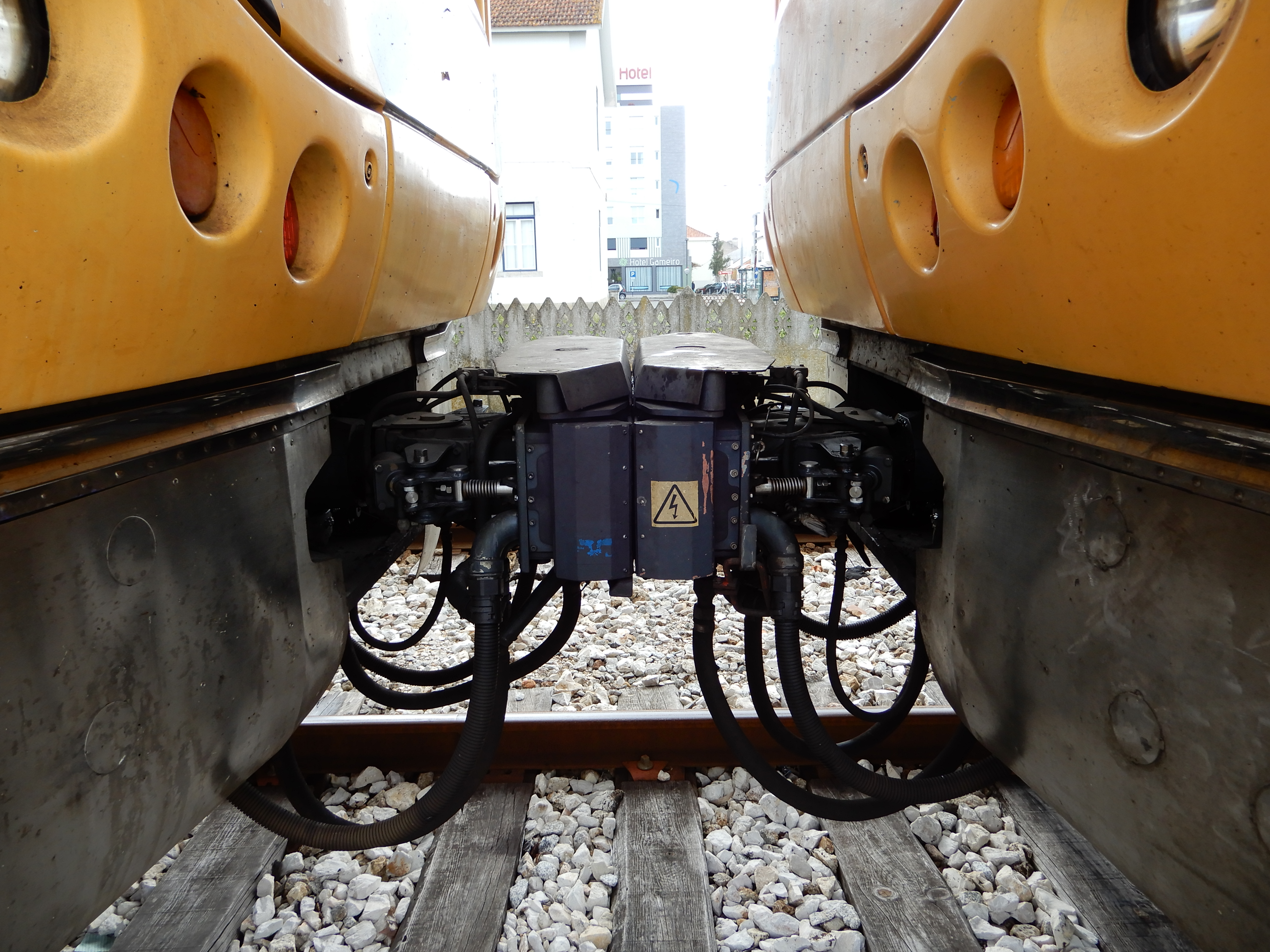
Engaged couplers of two CP 2240-class units.

=== Main Characteristics ===
- Top Speed: 120km/h (75mph)
- Tare Weight: 135,7t
- Bogies: 6 (2 per carriage)
- End couplers: Automatic, Dellner
- Intermediate couplers: Semi-permanent, Scharfenberg
- Passenger Space: 264 seated, 163 standing
- Seat Layout: 2+3 (except 2295, 2296 and 2297: 2+2)
- Doors: Automatic single-leaf plug doors, centrally locked
- Number of Doors: 5 per side (2 in each trailer car, 1 in the central power car)

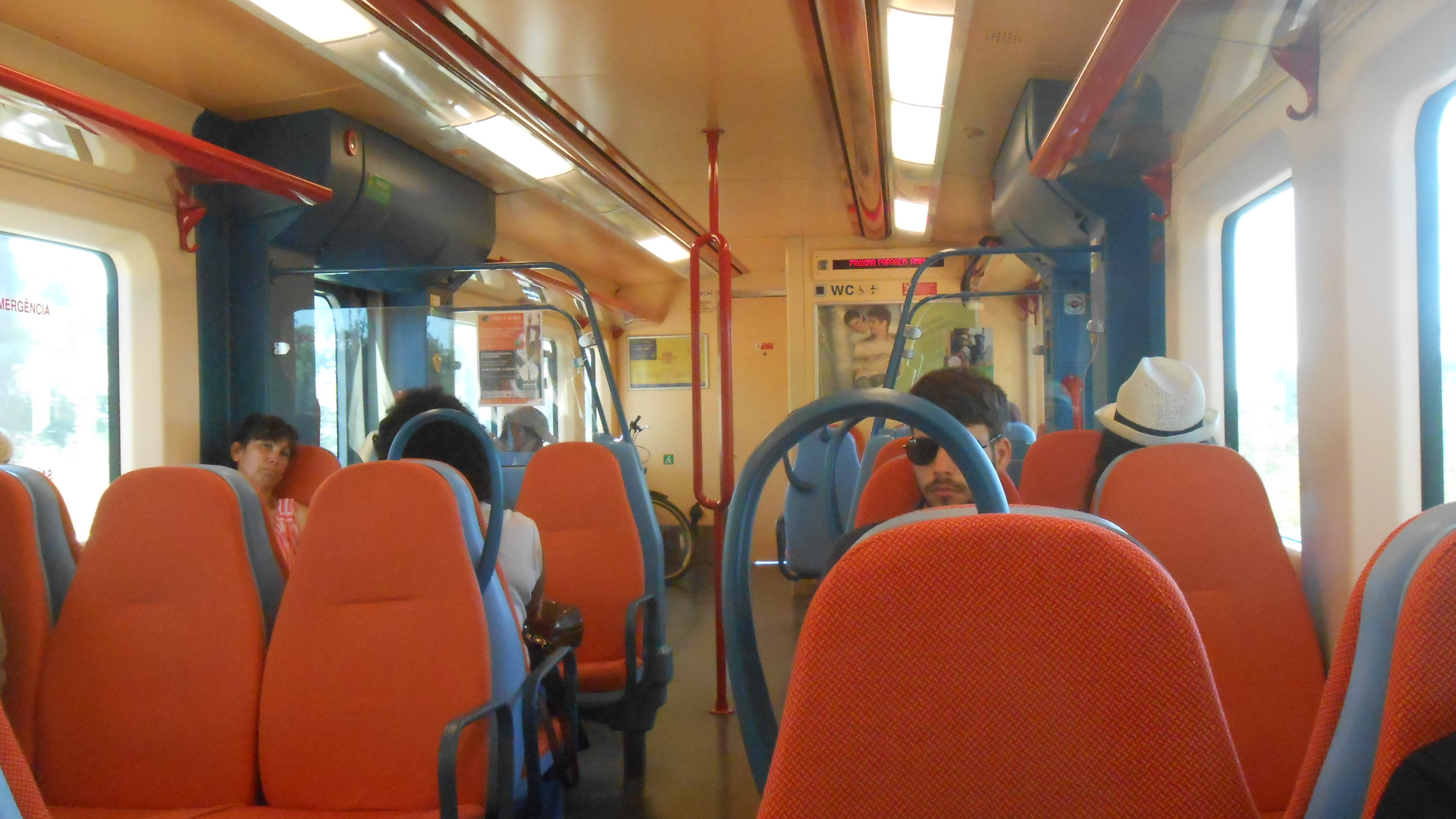
Interior of a CP 2240 EMU, showing the 2+3 seating layout.

=== Passenger Commodities ===
- Passenger Information System, which includes pre-recorded audio station announcements, dot-matrix displays that show exterior temperature, current time, next stop, and destination.
- Air conditioning system.

=== Safety Features ===
- CONVEL
- Dead-man's handle
- Ground radio
- Black-box (speed recorder)
