= Ramal da Lousã =

Portuguese railway line

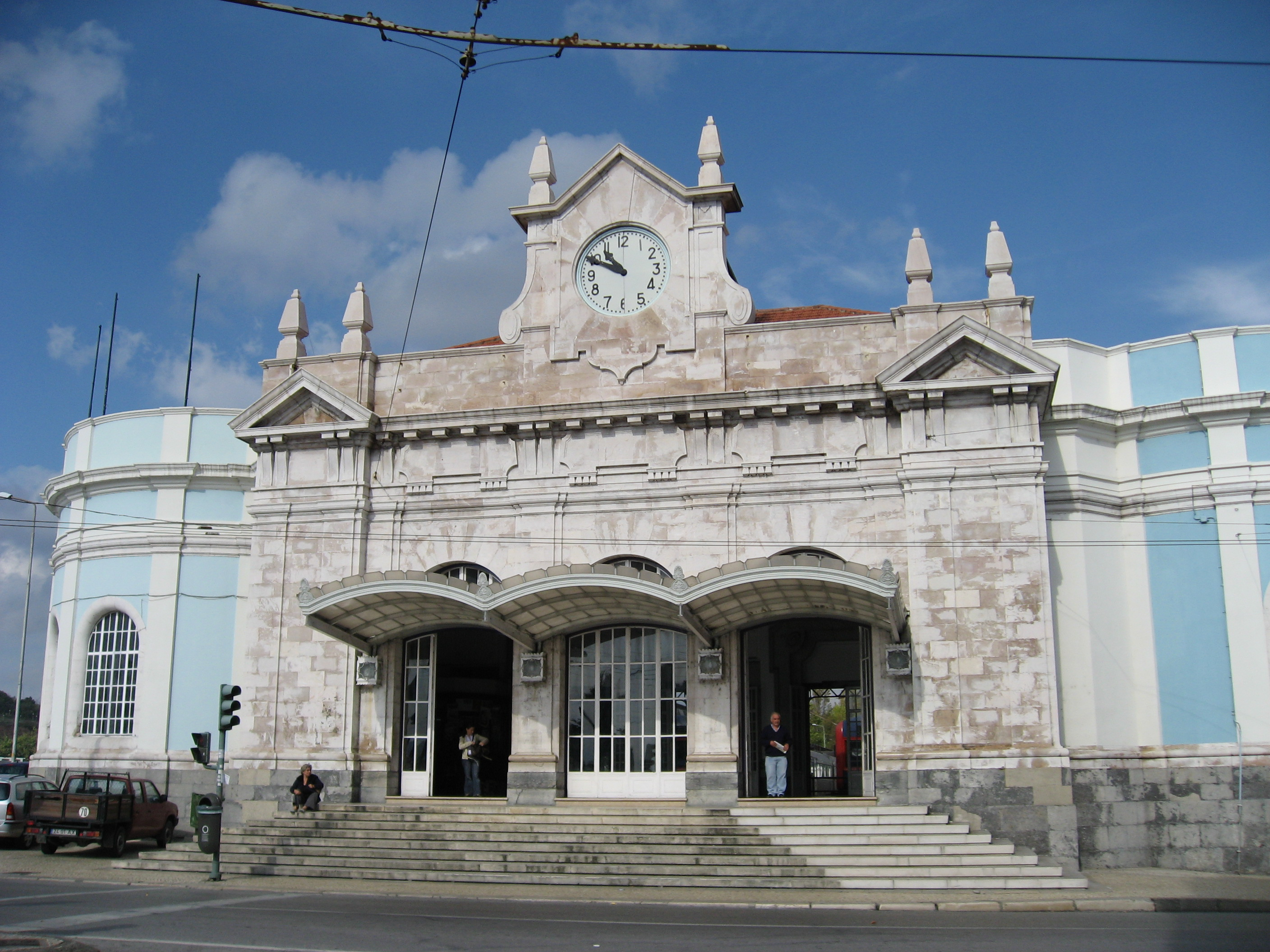
- Coimbra railway station.

Overview
- Status: Closed
- Owner: Infraestruturas de Portugal
- Termini: Coimbra-B; Serpins

Technical
- Line length: 36.8 km (22.9 mi)
- Track gauge: 1,668 mm (5 ft 5 21/32 in) Iberian gauge
- Electrification: 25 kV / 50 kHz Overhead line, at closure, between Coimbra-B and Coimbra
Route map
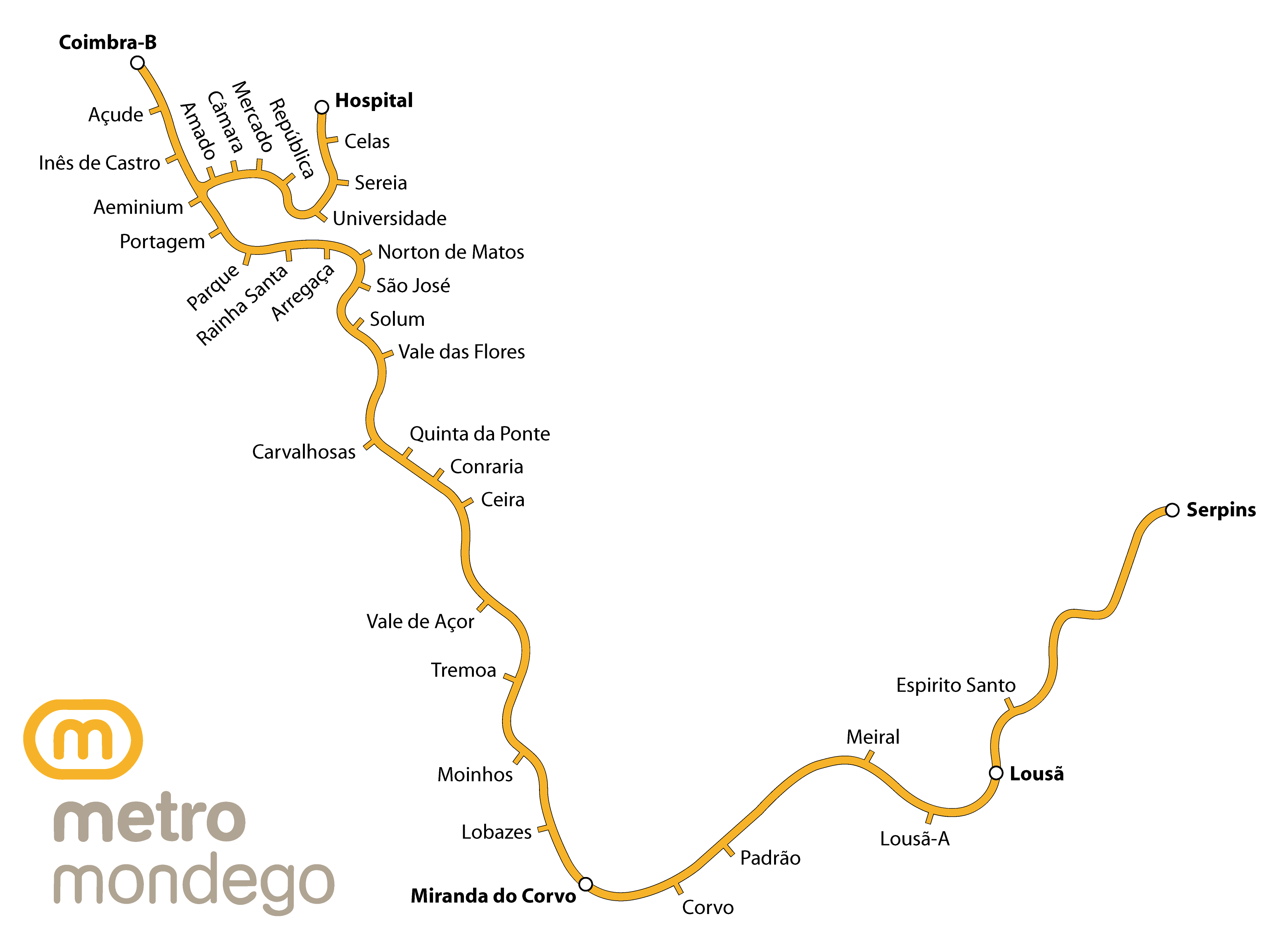

Location on the network
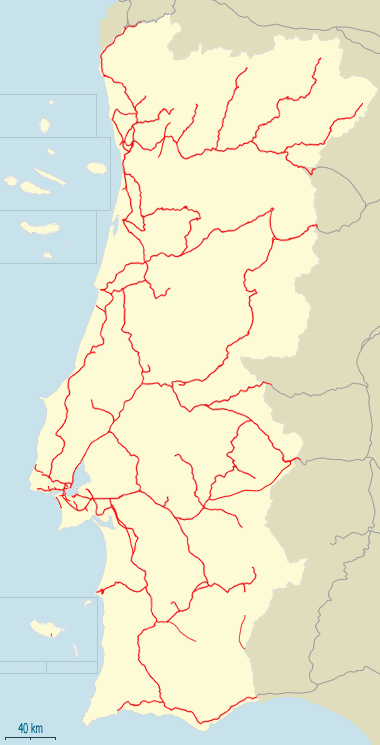

+ Coimbra-B × Serpins (🔎)

Ramal da Lousã was a railway line which connected the stations of Coimbra-B, on the Linha do Norte, and Serpins, in Portugal. It was opened by the Companhia Real dos Caminhos de Ferro Portugueses, under the name Ramal de Coimbra, on 18 October 1885, and was extended to Lousã on 16 December 1906, and to Serpins on 10 August 1930.

During the 1990s the Metro Mondego project was planned, with the intention of replacing the Ramal da Lousã with a light rail system. The section Miranda do Corvo–Serpins was closed on 1 December 2009, and the section Coimbra–Miranda do Corvo on 4 January 2010, with buses replacing the service. The section from Coimbra-B to Coimbra was not closed, making Coimbra the terminus again. The construction of the Metro Mondego started, but was stopped due to the 2010–14 Portuguese financial crisis. In 2017, the Portuguese government changed the plans for Metro Mondego, renaming it Sistema de Mobilidade do Mondego: instead of a light rail, it is to be a guided bus system. The line from Coimbra-B to Coimbra is due to close by the end of 2020, and the new system is planned to be operational in 2021. The line would be fully closed on 12 January 2025, with the closure of the Coimbra-B to Coimbra section.

Before the closures took place, Ramal da Lousã had a total length of 36.8 km (22.9 mi).

== See also ==
- List of railway lines in Portugal
- List of Portuguese locomotives and railcars
- History of rail transport in Portugal
