= CP Class 1550 =

Class 1550
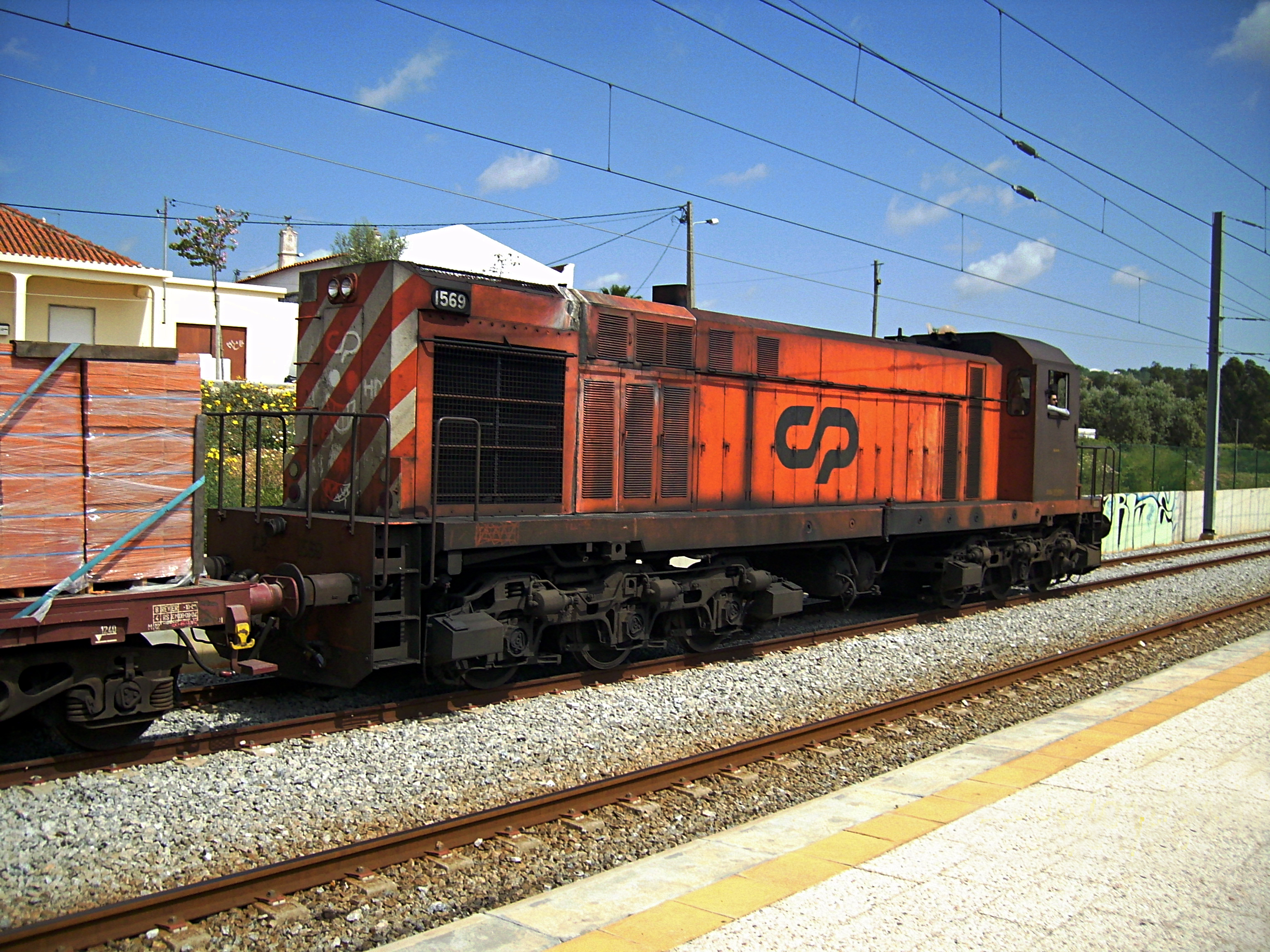
- Locomotive 1569 at Tunes railway station in 2008
Type and origin
- Power type: Diesel-electric
- Builder: Montreal Locomotive Works
- Model: MX 620
- Build date: 1973
- Total produced: 19
Specifications
- Configuration
  - AAR: C-C
  - UIC: co'co'
- Gauge: 1,668 mm (5 ft 5 21/32 in)
- Length: 17.905 m [58 ft 9 in]
- Width: 2.997 m [9 ft 10 in]
- Height: 4.356 m [14 ft 3.5 in]
- Fuel capacity: 4,000 L [1,056 US gal; 879 imp gal]
- Prime mover: ALCO 251C
- RPM range: 350-1,050 rpm
  - RPM low idle: 350
  - RPM idle: 400
  - Maximum RPM: 1,000-1,050
- Engine type: V16 Four-stroke diesel engine
- Transmission: diesel-electric
Career
- Operators: Comboios de Portugal
- Class: Série 1550
- Locale: Portugal
- First run: 1973

The Série 1550 are a series of 19 diesel-electric locomotives built for the Portuguese Railways (CP). They entered service in 1973; they were built in Canada by the Montreal Locomotive Works (MLW). The locomotives are MLW's type MX 620 design.

== See also ==
- List of MLW diesel locomotives
