= Metro Mondego =

Mondego Mobility System (SMM)

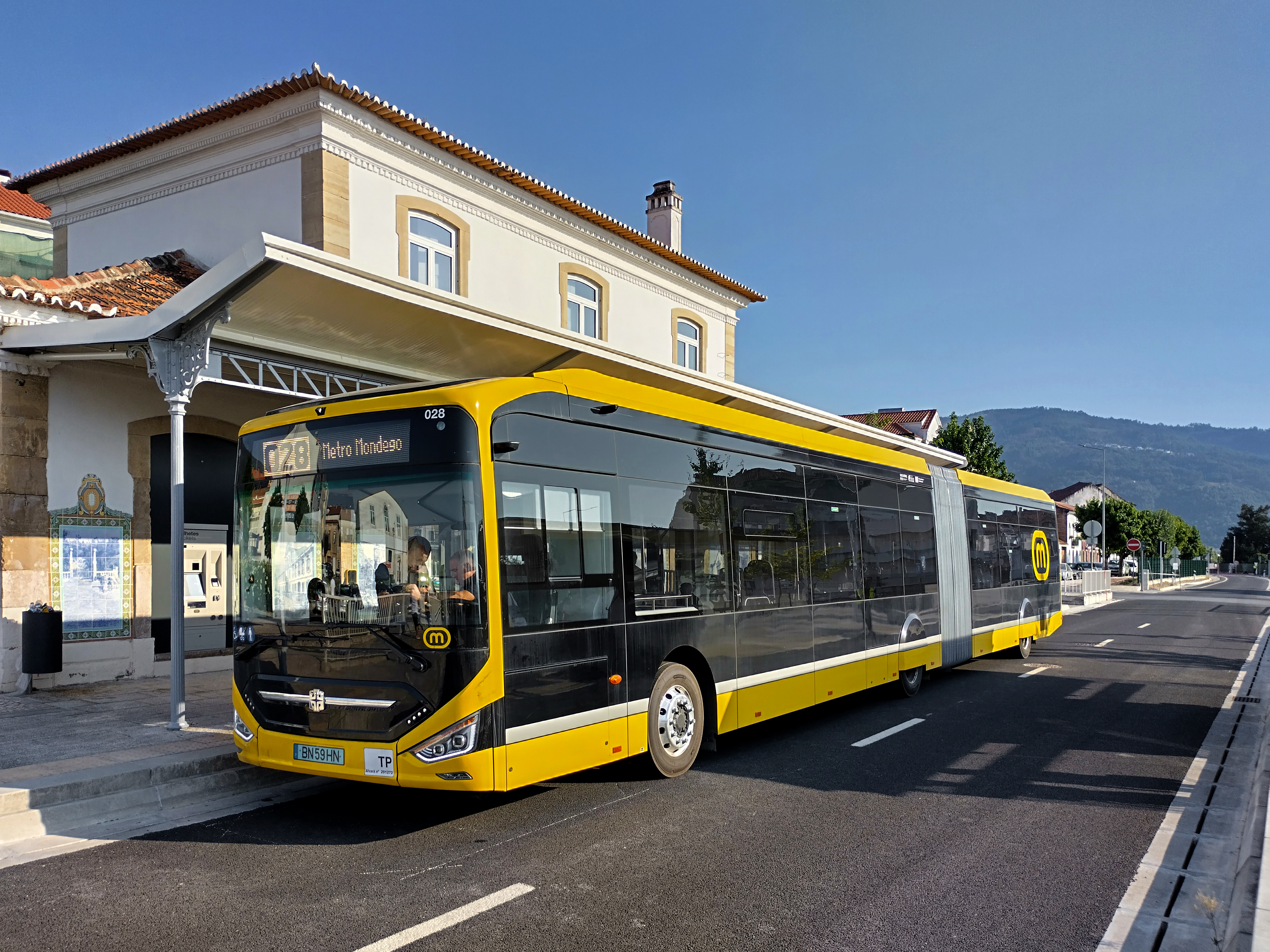
- Mondego Mobility System (SMM)

Overview
- Locale: Coimbra, Portugal
- Transit type: Bus rapid transit
- Number of lines: 3
- Number of stations: 42
- Daily ridership: 13 million (2025)
- Website: www.metromondego.pt/pt

Operation
- Began operation: 29 August 2025
- Operators: Metro Mondego, SA
- Number of vehicles: 35

Technical
- System length: 42 km (26 mi)
System map

The Metro Mondego, part of the Bus rapid transit, public transport system of Coimbra, Portugal, was to have been a light rail network that runs above ground in Coimbra into the city's suburbs. Studies and planning were in progress but the Metro Mondego project was cancelled in January 2011 at the height of Portuguese financial crisis. The operational conventional rail line connecting the municipalities of: Coimbra, Miranda do Corvo, Lousã, and Serpins was closed at the same time and replaced by an electric metrobus service. The Mondego mobility system began operating on 29 August 2025, operator by Metro Mondego, SA.

== History ==
A major part of the plan was to rejoin the isolated section of rail line between the stations of Coimbra - Parque and Serpins to the rest of the rail network at Coimbra and Coimbra - B station. This would have involved street running along Ave. Emídio Navarro and Ave. da Lousã between the two existing stations of Coimbra and Coimbra-Parque.

There was a single un-electrified track along that street section used once a day for a scheduled train. It was also used to transfer rolling stock to and from the Coimbra-Parque station. Travelling north, the trains ran in the opposite direction to road traffic along a one-way street. The track embedded in the street is still intact; however, the Coimbra-Parque station was demolished in March 2022, and by that time, the rails in the other sections of the track had been lifted.

There is some local agitation to have the Serpins aspect of the project restarted as there is dissatisfication with the replacement bus service; current plans see the replacement of the railway with a bus rapid transit service.

The Mondego Metro expects to handle 13 million passengers per year in 2025. The hospital line in the city center is part of the overall Mondego Mobility System (SMM) and will connect the city center to the Coimbra Hospital and University Centre using electric buses. This project involves several sections still to be completed, and its operational timeline is broadly grouped with the Coimbra-B service, with a general expected completion by 2026.

== Stations ==
Miranda do Corvo station

The system would have had two lines with several stations:

- Line A: Coimbra-B - Hospital
- Line B: Coimbra-B - Serpins along the line of the old railway.

=== Line A ===
- Coimbra B (train connections to Porto, Lisbon, Guarda, Figueira da Foz)
- Açude
- Inês de Castro
- Aeminium
- Arnado
- Câmara (City Hall)
- Mercado
- Praça da República
- Universidade (University)
- Sereia (Parque de Santa Cruz)
- Celas
- Hospital

=== Line B ===
- Coimbra B
- Açude
- Inês de Castro
- Aeminium
- Portagem
- Parque (near Mondego River)
- Rainha Santa
- Arregaça
- Norton Matos
- São José
- Solum (near Estádio Cidade de Coimbra)
- Vale das Flores
- Carvalhosas
- Quinta da Fonte
- Conraria
- Ceira
- Vale de Açor
- Tremoa
- Moinhos
- Lobazes
- Miranda do Corvo
- Corvo
- Padrão
- Meiral
- Lousã - A
- Lousã
- Espirito Santo
- Serpins

== Old system ==
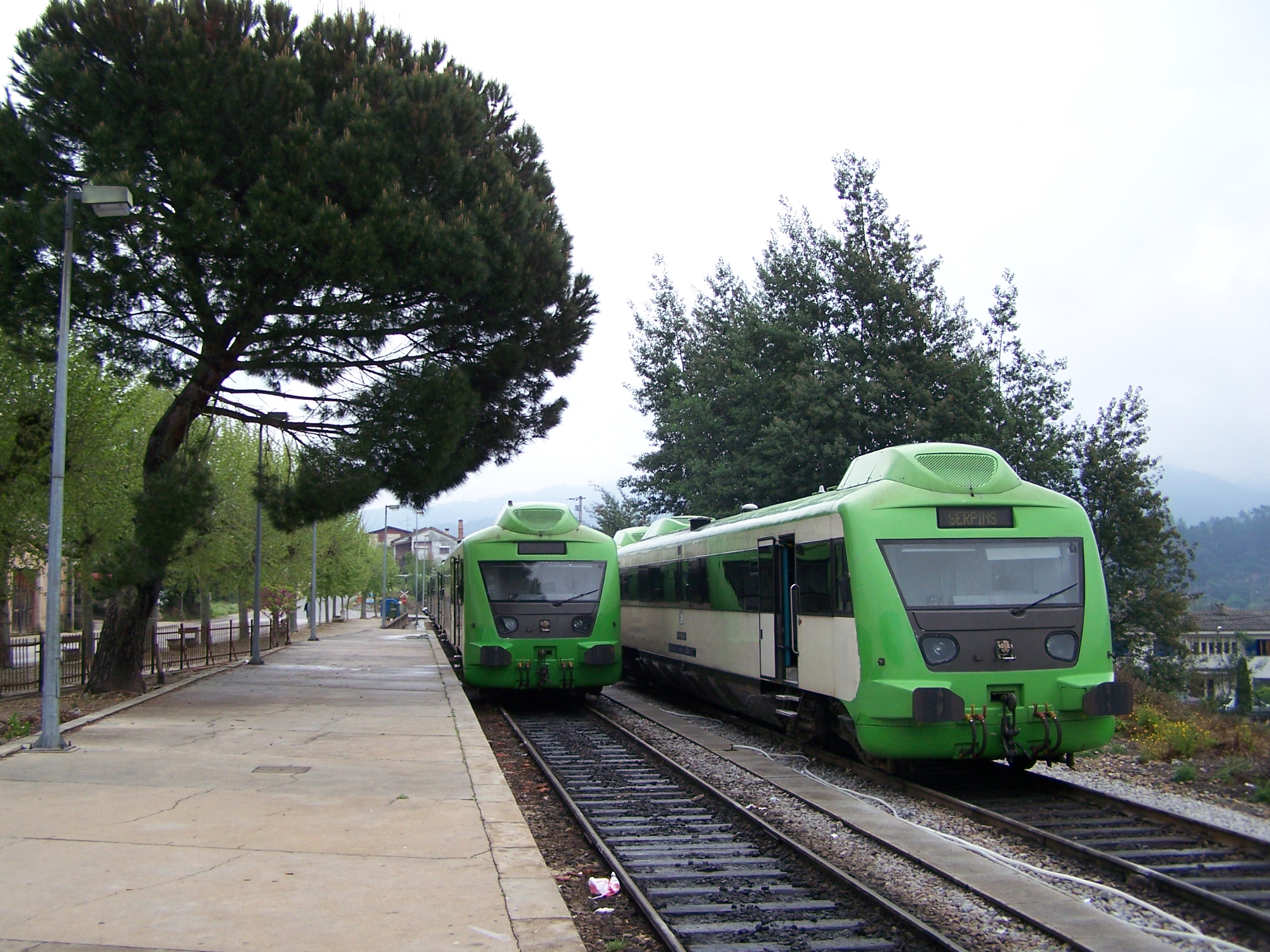
Ramal de Lousa Serpins trains sidings
