= CP Class 3150 =

CP Class 3150 CP Class 3250
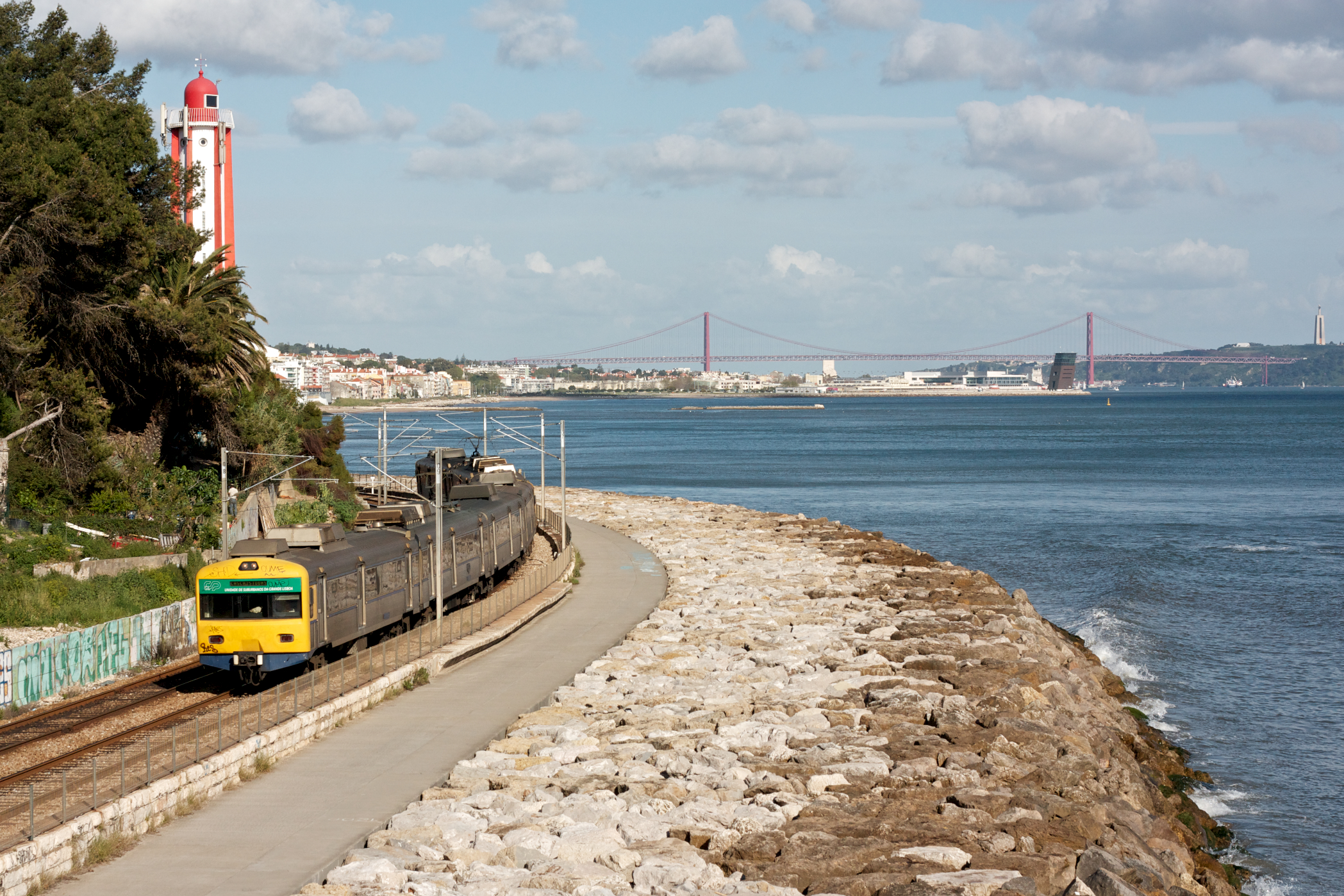
- Manufacturer: Cravens, GEC (Class 3100); Sorefame (Class 3150); GEC-Alsthom, Siemens (Class 3150 and 3250 refurb)
- Constructed: late-1950s
- Number built: 13

Specifications
- Wheelbase: 2'2'+Bo'Bo'+2'2'
- Maximum speed: 90 km/h (56 mph)
- Weight: 118.0 t (116.1 long tons; 130.1 short tons)
- Traction system: Electric
- Power output: 960 kW (1,287 hp)
- Electric system(s): 1500 V DC overhead line
- Track gauge: 1,668 mm (5 ft 5 21/32 in)

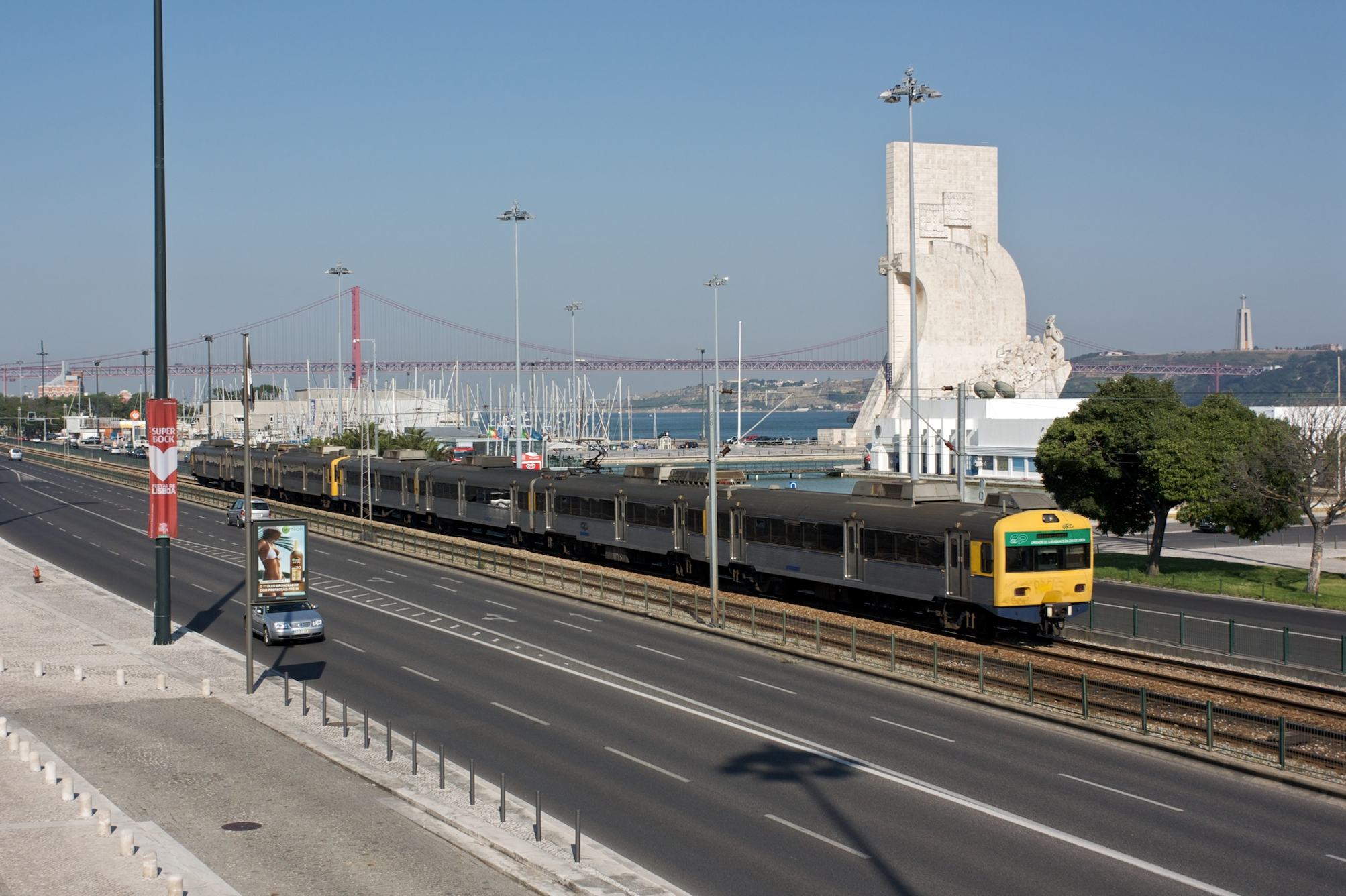
A multiple unit near 25 de Abril Bridge, Lisbon

CP Class 3100 and CP Class 3200 are two related series of railway multiple units with Iberian gauge, 2'2'+Bo'Bo'+2'2' wheel arrangement. They utilise a 1500 V direct current voltage system. They were first introduced in 1959 in the suburbs of Lisbon. The series was refurbished between 1998 and 2002. Since the renewal, this series has been known as the CP Class 3150 and CP Class 3250.
