= Linha de Sines =

Portuguese railway line

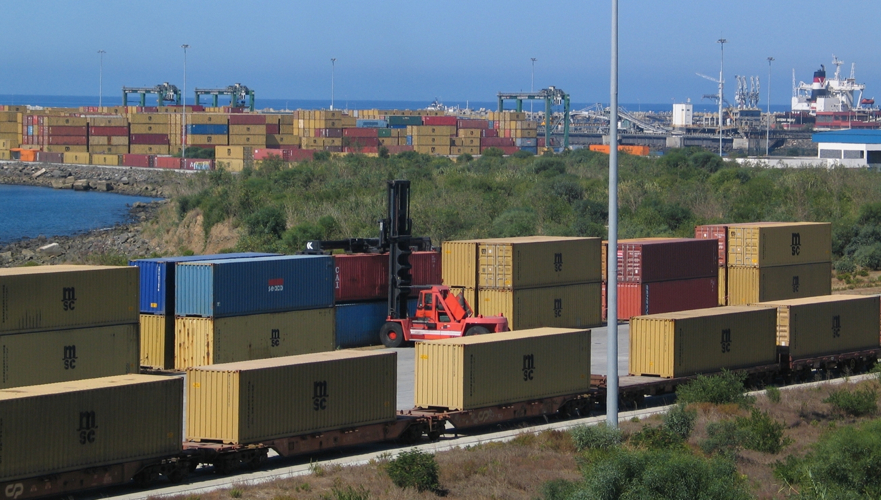
- Port of Sines

Overview
- Status: Operational
- Termini: Ermidas-Sado; Port of Sines

Technical
- Line length: 50 km (31 mi)
- Track gauge: 1,668 mm (5 ft 5 21/32 in) Iberian gauge
Route map
Location on the network

Linha de Sines is a railway line which connects the station of Ermidas-Sado, on the Linha do Sul, to the Port of Sines, in Portugal. It used to be connected to the station of Sines via a branch line. The first section, from Ermidas-Sado to São Bartolomeu da Serra was opened on 9 April 1927. The line reached Cumeadas on 1 July 1929, Santiago do Cacém on 20 June 1934, and Sines on 14 September 1936.

== See also ==
- List of railway lines in Portugal
- History of rail transport in Portugal
