= Mirobriga =

Mirobriga may refer to:

- The ancient Celtic name of the modern town of Ciudad Rodrigo, Spain
- Miróbriga, the site of Roman ruins near Santiago do Cacém, Portugal
