= Santiago do Cacém railway station =

Disused railway station in Portugal notable for its exterior decoration

Santiago do Cacém Railway Station
- Estação Ferroviária de Santiago do Cacém
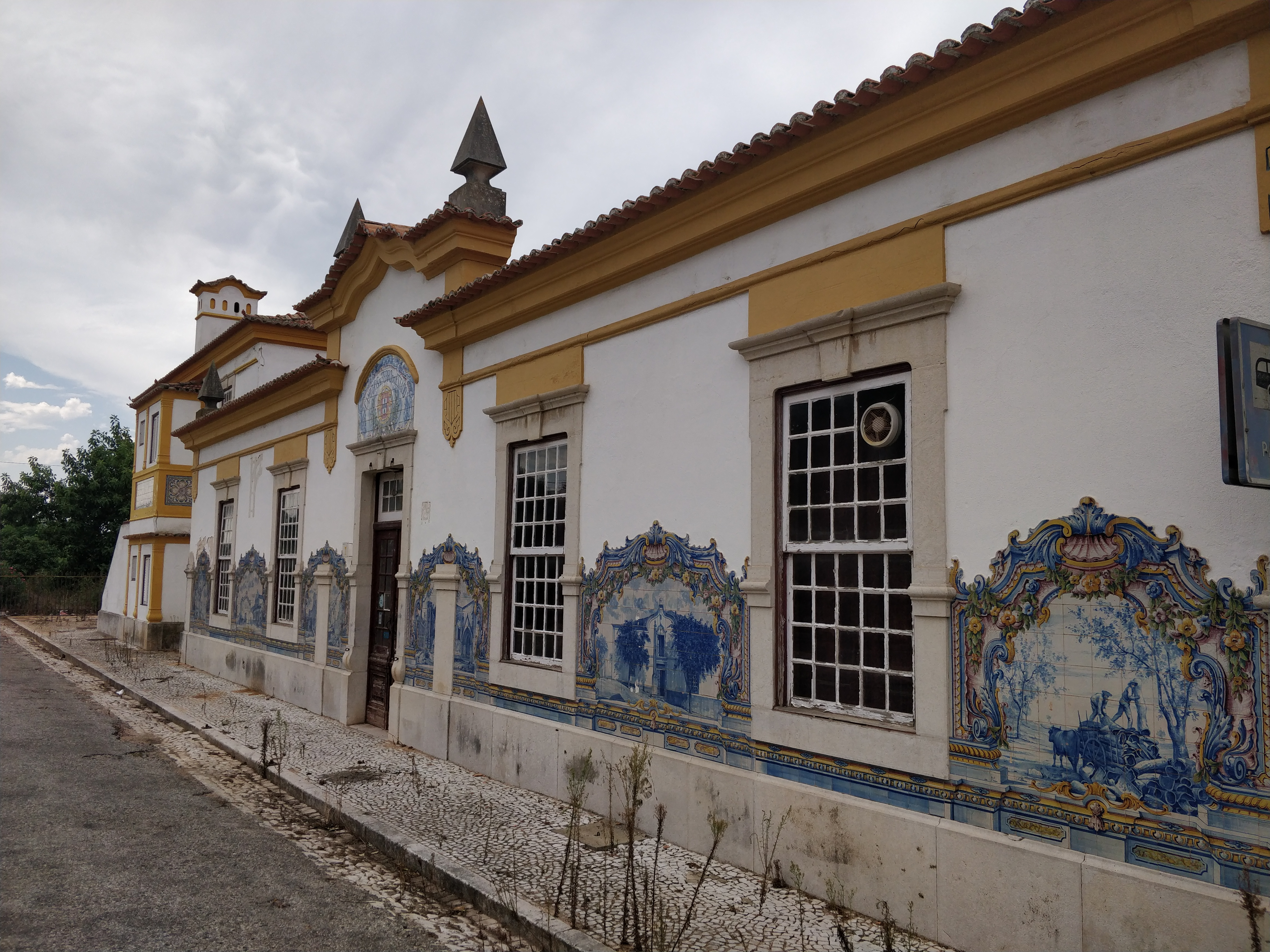
- The front of the Santiago do Cacém Railway Station
- Interactive map of the Santiago do Cacém Railway Station area

General information
- Type: Railway Station
- Location: Santiago do Cacém, Setúbal District, Portugal
- Coordinates: 38°01′03.5″N 8°42′13″W
- Completed: May 1933
- Opened: 21 June 1934
- Inaugurated: 21 June 1934
- Closed: 1980s

The Santiago do Cacém Railway Station is a disused railway station that served the town of Santiago do Cacém, in the Setúbal District of Portugal. It is notable for the azulejo tiles on its exterior.

== History ==
Before the railway was built, diligences were used to go to the Portuguese capital of Lisbon. From 1894 these went to Poceirão in the Palmela municipality, from where the train was taken to Barreiro on the River Tagus for the ferry crossing to the capital. The diligence was still in service in 1911 but was eventually replaced by a bus.

The Santiago do Cacém Railway Station was completed in May 1933. At the time it was located about 300 metres away from the town, which has since expanded. Operations began on 21 June 1934 when the line was connected from Ermidas-Sado, which was on the line connecting the Portuguese capital Lisbon to the Algarve. Santiago do Cacém was to be on the branch line that would connect Lisbon with the port of Sines, which was completed on 14 September 1936.

There was an elaborate opening ceremony for the new section of line and the Santiago do Cacém station. Many representatives of the Companhia dos Caminhos de Ferro Portugueses (Portuguese Railways Company), including the director and the chairman of the board, travelled from Lisbon for the event, together with the Minister of Public Works and his chief of staff. Other dignitaries joined when the train reached Setúbal. When they reached Santiago do Cacém they were met by a large number of local people, together with a band. Rockets were fired in celebration.

The station building followed a traditional Portuguese building design from the 17th and 18th centuries. Additionally, it was decorated with panels of azulejo tiles representing various aspects of the farming activities of the town as well as views of the town. These were mainly paid for by the Municipality of Santiago do Cacém and were manufactured by the Sant'Anna Factory in Lisbon. The interior has a single floor decorated with patterned tiles. Houses were built next to the station to house the Station Master and other staff. The station was closed in the 1980s. For a time the building was used as a bar but in 2020 it was not being used.
