= Castelo de Santiago do Cacém =

Castle in Santiago do Cacém, Portugal

Coordinates: 38°00′53″N 8°41′54″W

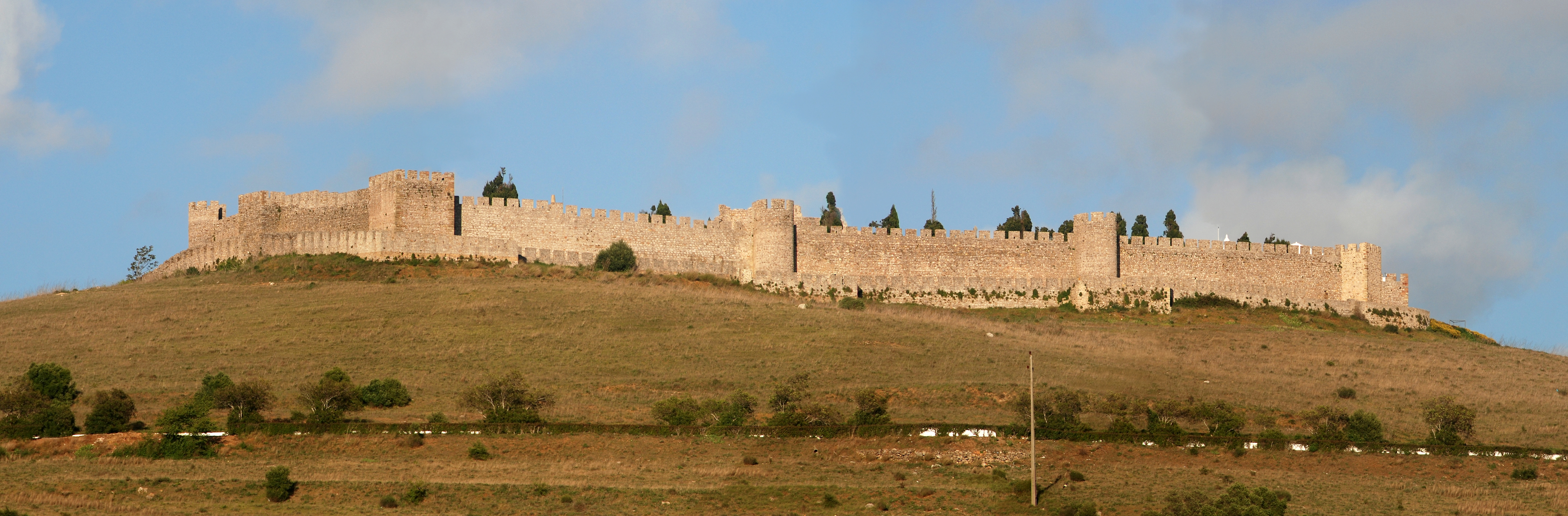
The castle of Santiago do Cacém, Portugal

Castelo de Santiago do Cacém is a castle in the municipality of Santiago do Cacém, Portugal. It is classified as a national monument.

== History ==
Early human occupation of the site dates back to Celtic tribes. During the Roman occupation of the Iberian peninsula, the village was called Mirobriga and included the jurisdiction of Pax Julia (currently Beja) The village was occupied by the Alans during the first decades of the 5th century, then abandoned in the 6th century, when the population relocated to a neighbouring hill nearer to the sea. The new village was successively ruled by the Visigoths, followed by the Moors at the beginning of the second decade of the 8th century, in 712. It was then known as Kassen.

=== The medieval castle ===
The castle was built by the moors. During the Iberian peninsula's Reconquista period, Santiago do Cacém was taken for the first time in 1157 in the context of the conquest of Alcácer do Sal by the forces of Afonso I of Portugal (1112–1185). The forces of Almohad caliph Abu Yusuf Ya'qub al-Mansur retook the city in 1190–1191. In 1186, King Sancho I of Portugal awarded the dominions of Almada, Palmela and Alcácer do Sal to the Order of Santiago. The first two had previously been reconquered in 1194, whereas the third remained under Moorish control until 1217. That year, under the reign of Afonso II (1211–1223), Cacém became a definitive possession of Portugal. Its domain was given to the knights of the Order, essentially warrior monks, left to rebuild defences. Since this time the village has been known by its current name: Santiago do Cacém. Its first charter also dates from this time. Under the reign of Denis of Portugal (1279–1325), the castle was in the possession of Vataça Lascaris (Dona Vetácia), nurse and friend of Queen Elizabeth of Portugal. In the period from 1315 to 1336, the domain was returned to the Order of Santiago. During the 1383–85 Crisis, Santiago do Cacém was one of the first towns to support the Master of Avis, since Fernando Afonso de Albuquerque, Master of Santiago, had made available all of the Order's resources to his cause. In 1512, under the reign of Manuel I of Portugal, the Foral Novo was written (an important document relating regional economic and social history). At the time of the Philippine Dynasty, Philip I of Portugal donated the castle to the dukes of Aveiro (1594).

=== War of the Restoration to present day ===
The town lost strategic importance after the Portuguese Restoration War, in the 17th century. The castle and its domain returned to crown control in 1759. The old castle was gradually abandoned and fell to ruin. The site's grounds were used as the town's cemetery in the 19th century. The castle was declared a national monument on 23 June 1910. More recently, the Portuguese DGEMN (Direcção Geral dos Edifícios e Monumentos Nacionais) has funded restoration projects.

== Characteristics ==
=== Santiago do Cacém Castle ===
The castle is almost rectangular in shape and there are still some remains of the original Moorish fortification. The walls and battlements were reinforced by ten square towers and semi-cylindrical turrets, externally defended by a barbican, also strengthened by turrets. The ancient church of Santiago is integrated into the south-east part of the wall. Original Romanesque and Gothic architecture can still be seen alongside later styles. Carvings of the saint fighting the Moors can be viewed inside the church. Zoomorphic motifs line the south porch. This part of the medieval citadel comprises remains of the original fortress.

== Castle legends ==
=== Legend of the foundation ===
At the time of the Moors' occupation, the Lord of the region was a rich Moor who had three children; two boys and a girl. As he grew old and neared death, he called for his children and told them he wished to share his wealth, asking them to do so harmoniously between themselves. Following custom, the eldest son took the lands he desired and the second son acted in the same way with the remaining land. There still remained a vast area of land and wealth for the daughter. The elderly father asked her if she was satisfied with what remained, to which she replied: - Yes, father. But I do not wish for property. I think it is more important for us to have a castle to defend ourselves. Therefore, I only desire the bare land which can be covered by this ox-hide. Before the admiration of her father and brothers, she showed them the ox-hide with which she would delineate the territory of her inheritance. She then cut the skin into thin strips and proceeded to mark the perimeter of the chosen area. Three days of heavy fog followed, at the end of which appeared to all as, if by magic, the Castle of Santiago do Cacém. (Adapted from Suplemento Litoral Alentejano, December 1998)

=== Legend of the Byzantine princess ===
Another legend tells of a princess called Bataça Lascaris (Vataça Lascaris), who came from the eastern Mediterranean at the head of an armed squadron. She came ashore at Sines, marched south and attacked a Moorish settlement governed by a man named Kassen. The princess took him on in battle, defeating him at the castle of Santiago on 25 July. For this reason, the town became known as Santiago de Kassen. (Adapted from Júlio Gil, Os Mais Belos Castelos de Portugal.)
