= Redes Energéticas Nacionais =

Portuguese energy sector company

REN - Redes Energéticas Nacionais, SGPS, S.A.
- Type: Sociedade Anónima
- Traded as: Euronext: RENE
- Industry: Utilities
- Founded: 1994
- Headquarters: Av. dos Estados Unidos da América 55, 1000-003 Lisbon, Portugal
- Key people: Rodrigo Costa (Chairman and CEO)
- Services: Transmission system operator; storage and transportation of LNG
- Net income: €153.2 million (2024)
- Number of employees: 800 (2025)
- Website: ren.pt

REN - Redes Energéticas Nacionais, SGPS, S.A. (formerly Rede Eléctrica Nacional S.A.) is a Portuguese energy sector company which is the current concession holder of the country's two main energy infrastructure networks: the National Electricity Transmission Grid (RNT) and the National Natural Gas Transportation Grid (RNTGN). It is responsible for the planning, construction, operation, maintenance and global technical management of both these grids and associated infrastructures. Its stated mission is to provide a guarantee of an uninterrupted and stable supply of energy while ensuring equal rights of grid access to the remaining participants in the energy market, including consumers, generators and distributors.

The company is also involved with the storage and transportation of liquefied natural gas, and owns and operates an LNG regasification terminal located at Sines.
