= Santiago do Cacém =

- Municipality
- City of Santiago do Cacém
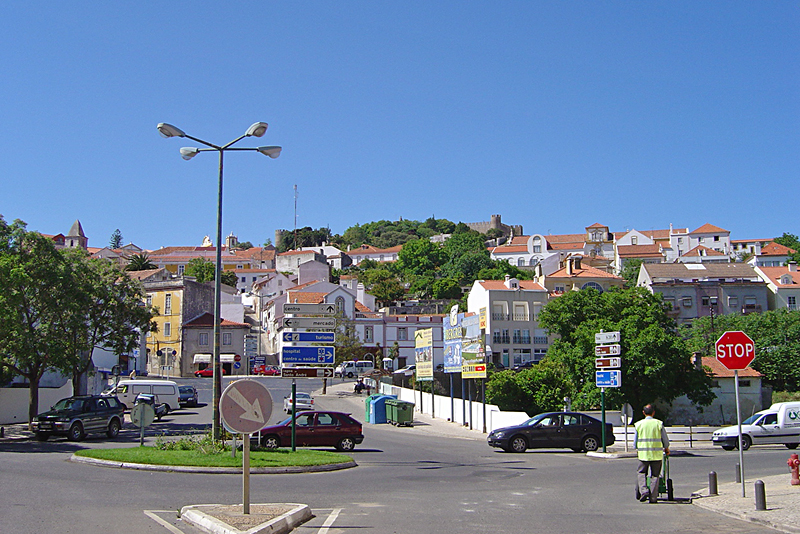
- View of Santiago do Cacém

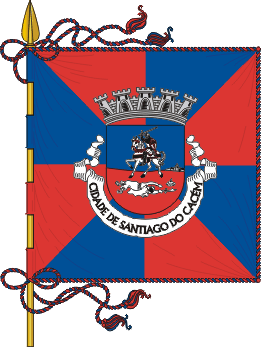
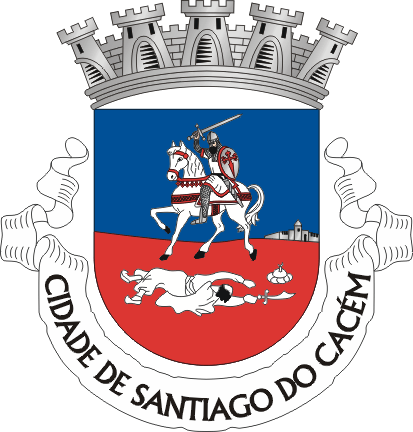
- Flag Coat of arms
- Interactive map of Santiago do Cacém
- Coordinates: 38°01′N 8°42′W
- Country: Portugal
- Region: Alentejo
- Intermunic. comm.: Alentejo Litoral
- District: Setúbal
- Parishes: 8

Government
  - President: Vítor Proença (CDU)

Area
  - Total: 1,059.69 km^{2} (409.15 sq mi)

Population (2011)
  - Total: 29,749
  - Density: 28.073/km^{2} (72.710/sq mi)
- Time zone: UTC+00:00 (WET)
  - Summer (DST): UTC+01:00 (WEST)
- Local holiday: Saint James; July 25
- Website: www.cm-santiagocacem.pt

Santiago do Cacém, (Note: European Portuguese pronunciation: [sɐ̃tiˈaɣu ðu kɐˈsɐ̃j]) officially the City of Santiago do Cacém, is a city and a municipality in Setúbal District in Portugal. The population in 2011 was 29,749, in an area of 1059.69 km^{2}.

The present mayor is Álvaro Beijinha, elected by the Unitary Democratic Coalition. The municipal holiday is July 25.

== Places of interest ==
- Harmonia Society
- Park Rio da Figueira
- Miróbriga Ruins
- Castelo de Santiago do Cacém
- Santiago do Cacém Railway Station

== Parishes ==
Administratively, the municipality is divided into eight civil parishes (freguesias):

- Abela
- Alvalade
- Cercal do Alentejo
- Ermidas-Sado
- Santiago do Cacém, Santa Cruz e São Bartolomeu da Serra
- Santo André
- São Domingos e Vale de Água
- São Francisco da Serra

== Climate ==
Climate data for Santiago do Cacém, 1941-1990, altitude: 228 m (748 ft)
Month	Jan	Feb	Mar	Apr	May	Jun	Jul	Aug	Sep	Oct	Nov	Dec	Year
Mean daily maximum °C (°F)	13.5 (56.3)	14.4 (57.9)	16.5 (61.7)	18.3 (64.9)	20.5 (68.9)	24.0 (75.2)	26.2 (79.2)	26.6 (79.9)	25.5 (77.9)	22.0 (71.6)	17.3 (63.1)	14.3 (57.7)	19.9 (67.9)
Daily mean °C (°F)	10.4 (50.7)	11.2 (52.2)	12.7 (54.9)	14.3 (57.7)	16.2 (61.2)	19.2 (66.6)	21.0 (69.8)	21.4 (70.5)	20.7 (69.3)	17.9 (64.2)	13.9 (57.0)	11.2 (52.2)	15.8 (60.5)
Mean daily minimum °C (°F)	7.3 (45.1)	7.9 (46.2)	8.9 (48.0)	10.2 (50.4)	11.9 (53.4)	14.4 (57.9)	15.8 (60.4)	16.1 (61.0)	15.8 (60.4)	13.7 (56.7)	10.5 (50.9)	8.1 (46.6)	11.7 (53.1)
Source: Instituto Português do Mar e da Atmosfera

Climate data for Alvalade, 1971-2000, altitude: 61 m (200 ft)
Month	Jan	Feb	Mar	Apr	May	Jun	Jul	Aug	Sep	Oct	Nov	Dec	Year
Record high °C (°F)	23.0 (73.4)	25.4 (77.7)	30.4 (86.7)	32.0 (89.6)	37.0 (98.6)	43.5 (110.3)	45.1 (113.2)	41.2 (106.2)	40.0 (104.0)	34.5 (94.1)	29.0 (84.2)	25.1 (77.2)	45.1 (113.2)
Mean daily maximum °C (°F)	15.4 (59.7)	16.6 (61.9)	19.3 (66.7)	20.5 (68.9)	23.5 (74.3)	28.0 (82.4)	31.3 (88.3)	31.5 (88.7)	29.3 (84.7)	24.2 (75.6)	19.5 (67.1)	16.4 (61.5)	23.0 (73.3)
Daily mean °C (°F)	9.5 (49.1)	10.8 (51.4)	12.5 (54.5)	14.1 (57.4)	16.9 (62.4)	20.5 (68.9)	22.8 (73.0)	22.8 (73.0)	21.0 (69.8)	17.4 (63.3)	13.3 (55.9)	10.9 (51.6)	16.0 (60.9)
Mean daily minimum °C (°F)	3.6 (38.5)	5.0 (41.0)	5.7 (42.3)	7.7 (45.9)	10.4 (50.7)	13.0 (55.4)	14.4 (57.9)	14.1 (57.4)	12.8 (55.0)	10.4 (50.7)	7.2 (45.0)	5.3 (41.5)	9.1 (48.4)
Record low °C (°F)	−6.3 (20.7)	−7.0 (19.4)	−3.0 (26.6)	−0.6 (30.9)	1.5 (34.7)	6.0 (42.8)	8.2 (46.8)	6.3 (43.3)	4.2 (39.6)	−3.6 (25.5)	−5.0 (23.0)	−5.5 (22.1)	−7.0 (19.4)
Average rainfall mm (inches)	73.2 (2.88)	57.3 (2.26)	38.5 (1.52)	58.7 (2.31)	40.9 (1.61)	10.9 (0.43)	3.3 (0.13)	2.8 (0.11)	23.7 (0.93)	65.6 (2.58)	78.5 (3.09)	96.3 (3.79)	549.7 (21.64)
Average rainy days (≥ 0.1 mm)	10.1	9.6	7.3	10.1	7.4	2.8	1.2	1.2	3.7	8.0	9.2	11.7	82.3
Source: Instituto Português do Mar e da Atmosfera

== Gallery ==
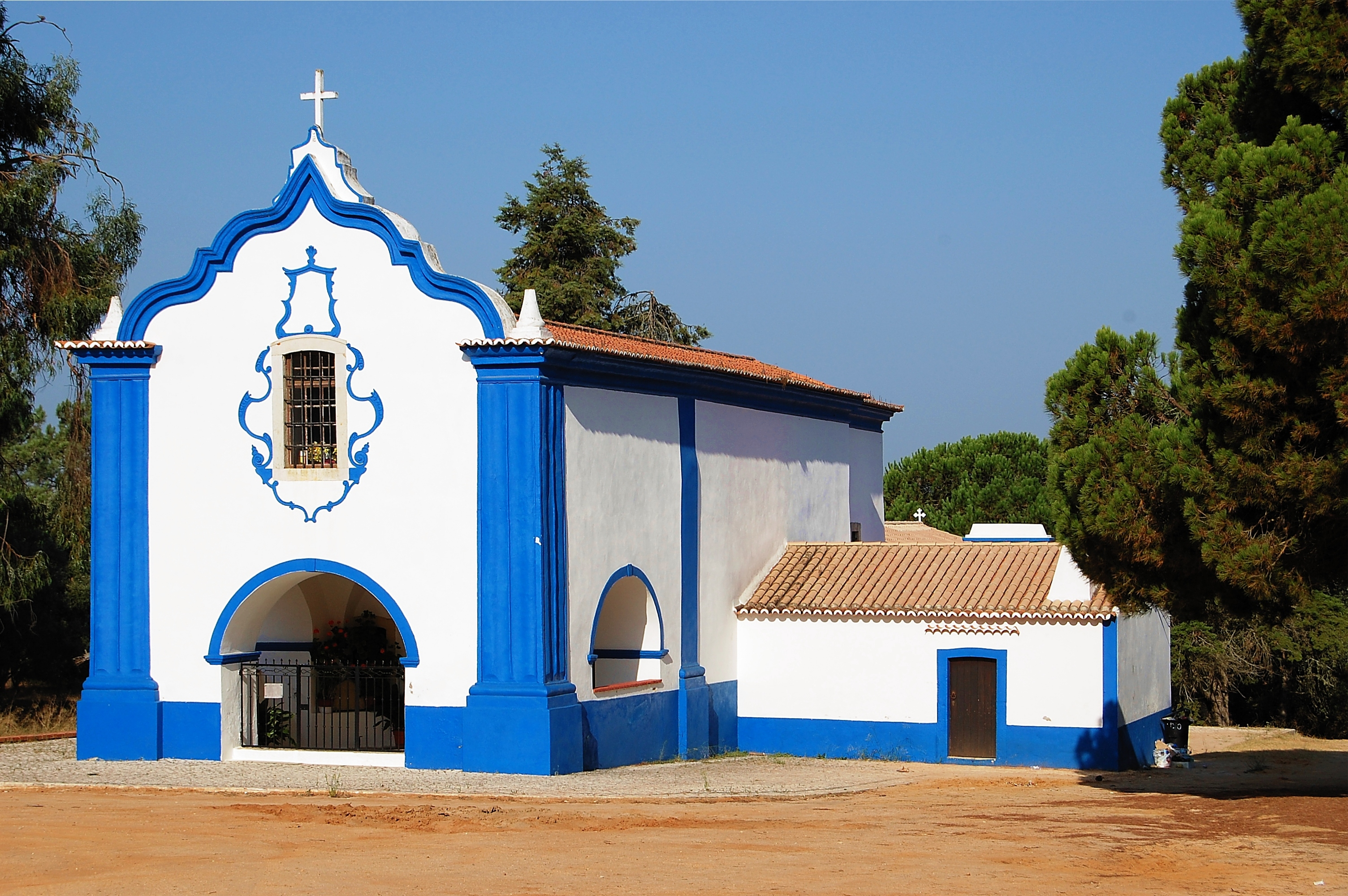
A local church depicting southern Portugal's typical charm.

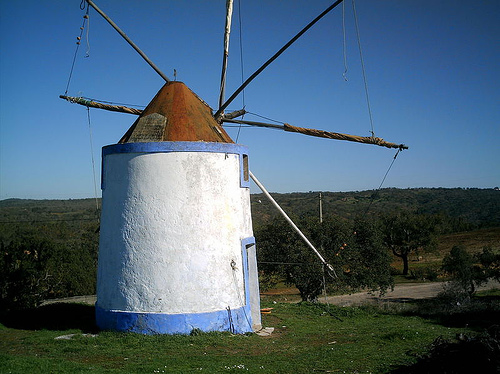
A local windmill.

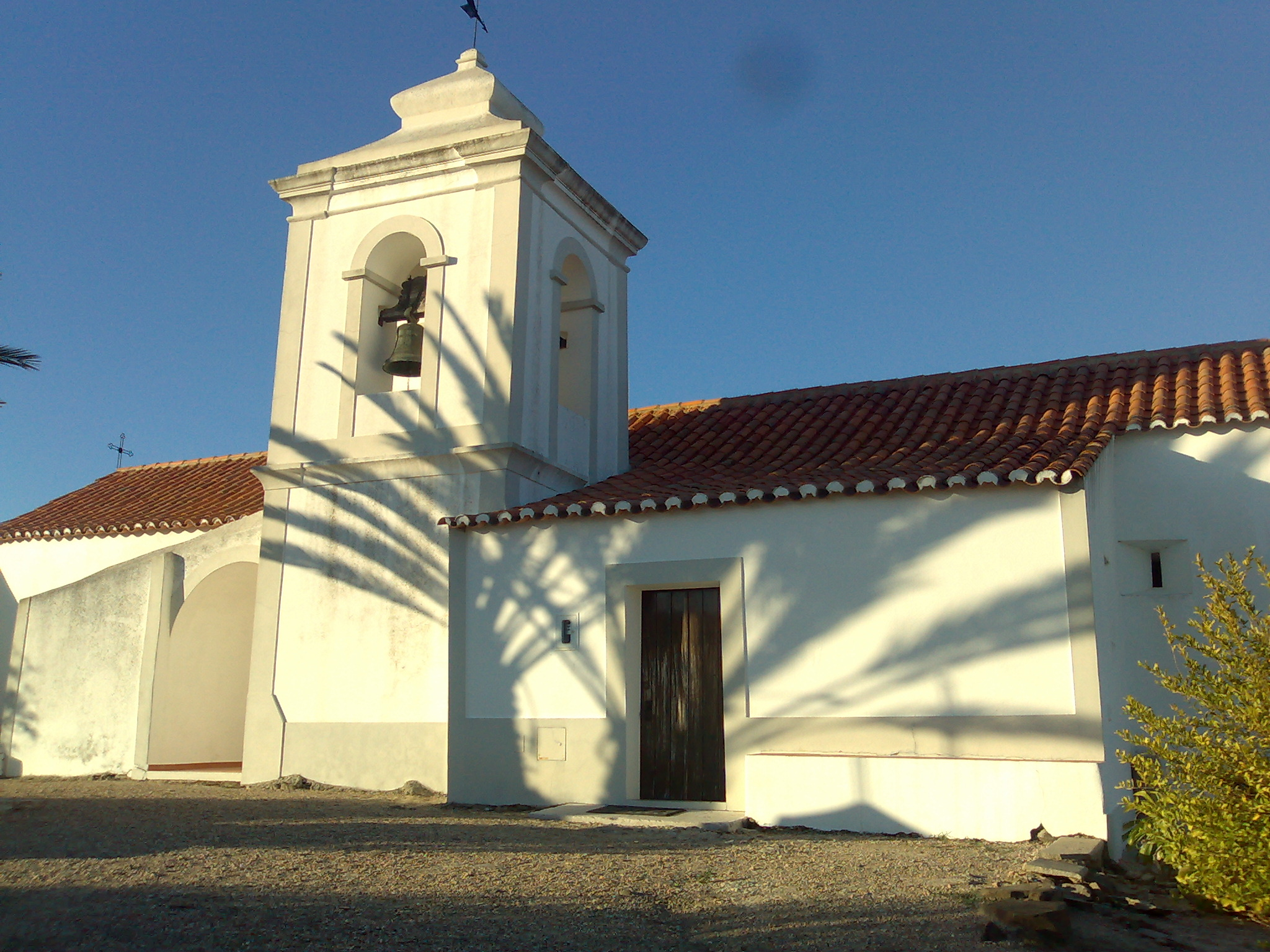
Another local church.

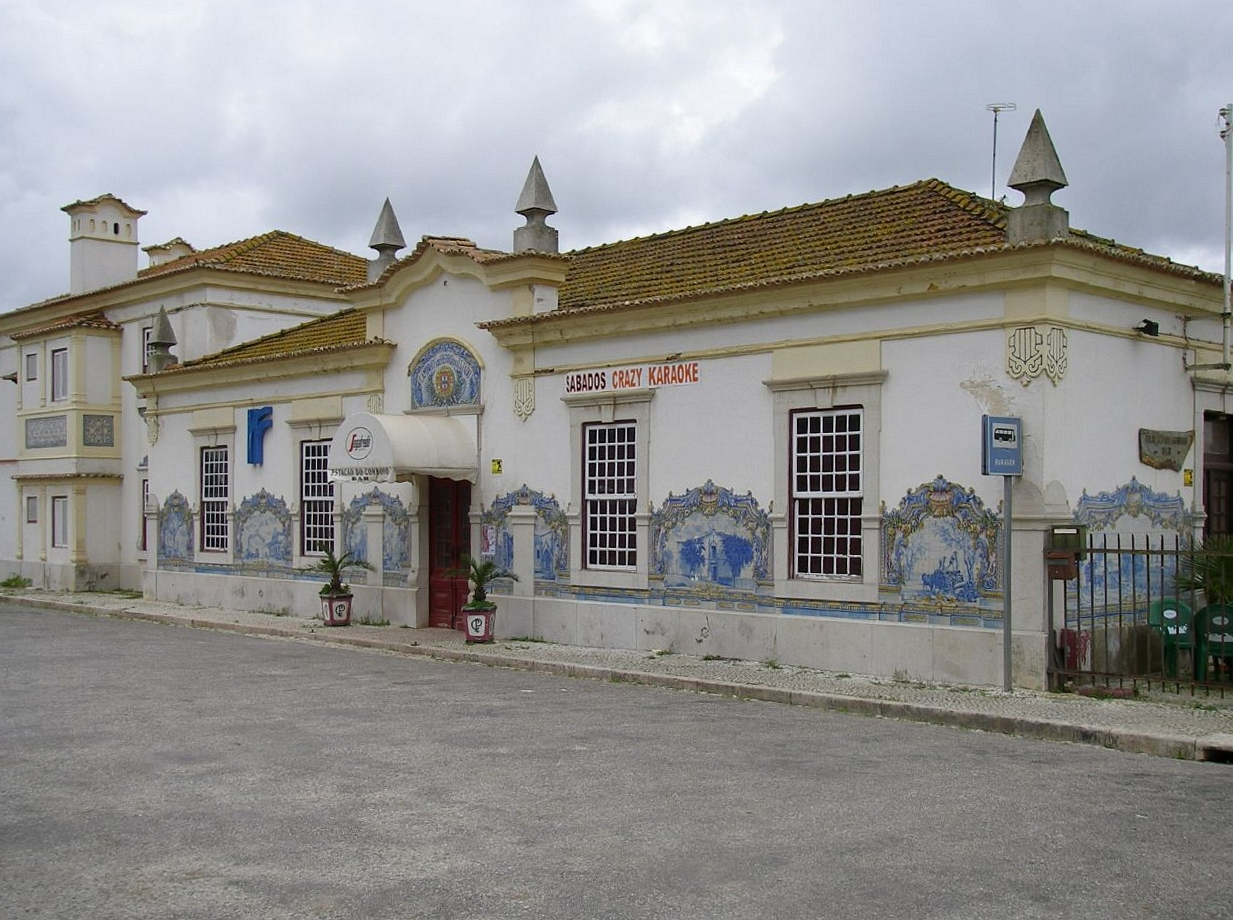
The local train station.

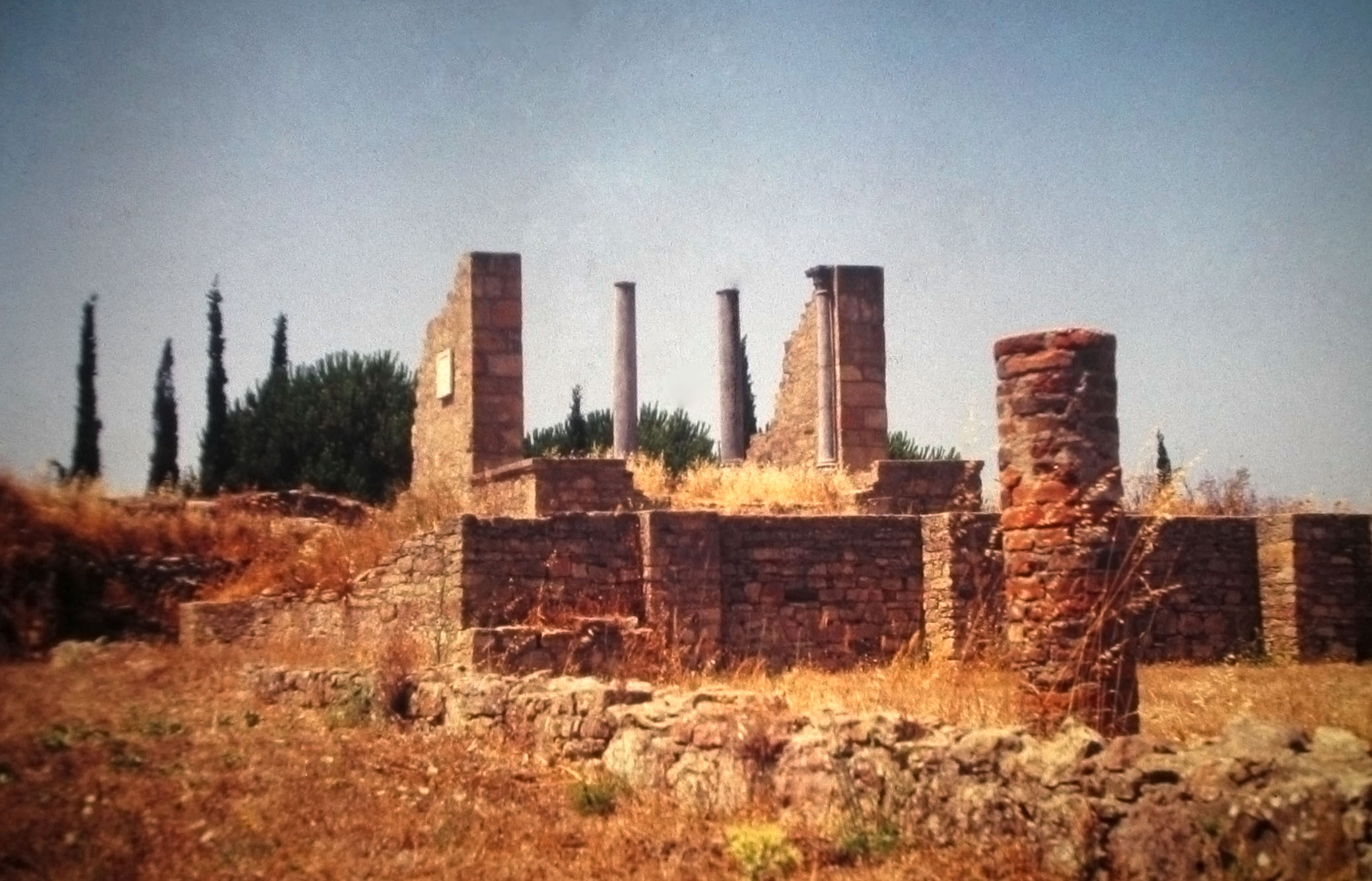
Mirobriga's Roman ruins.

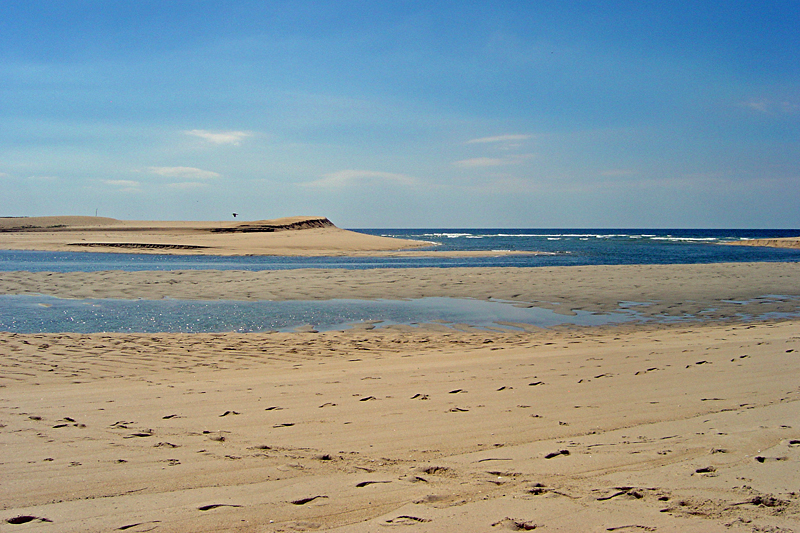
Santo André Lagoon.
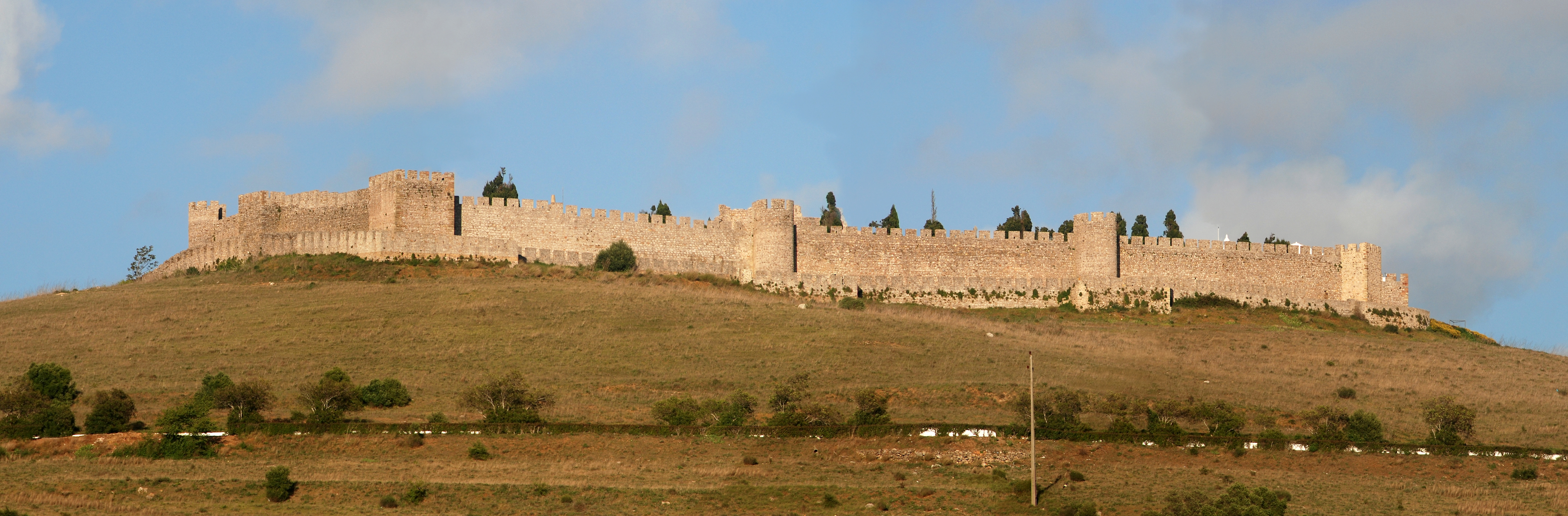
The local castle

== International relations ==
Santiago do Cacém is twinned with:

- Santiago de Compostela, Spain

== Notable people ==
- Martim Soares Moreno (ca.1586 in Santiago do Cacém - ca.1648) an explorer in the colony of Brazil
- Manuel da Fonseca (1911 in Santiago do Cacém – 1993) a Portuguese writer
- Silvino Soares (born 1978 in Santiago do Cacém) a Cape Verdean footballer.
- Alberto Louzeiro (born 1982 in Santiago do Cacém) a Portuguese footballer with over 250 club caps
- Aurea Sousa (born 1987 in Santiago do Cacém) known as Aurea, a soul, blues, pop, reggae and R&B singer
