= Ramal de Sines =

Portuguese railway line

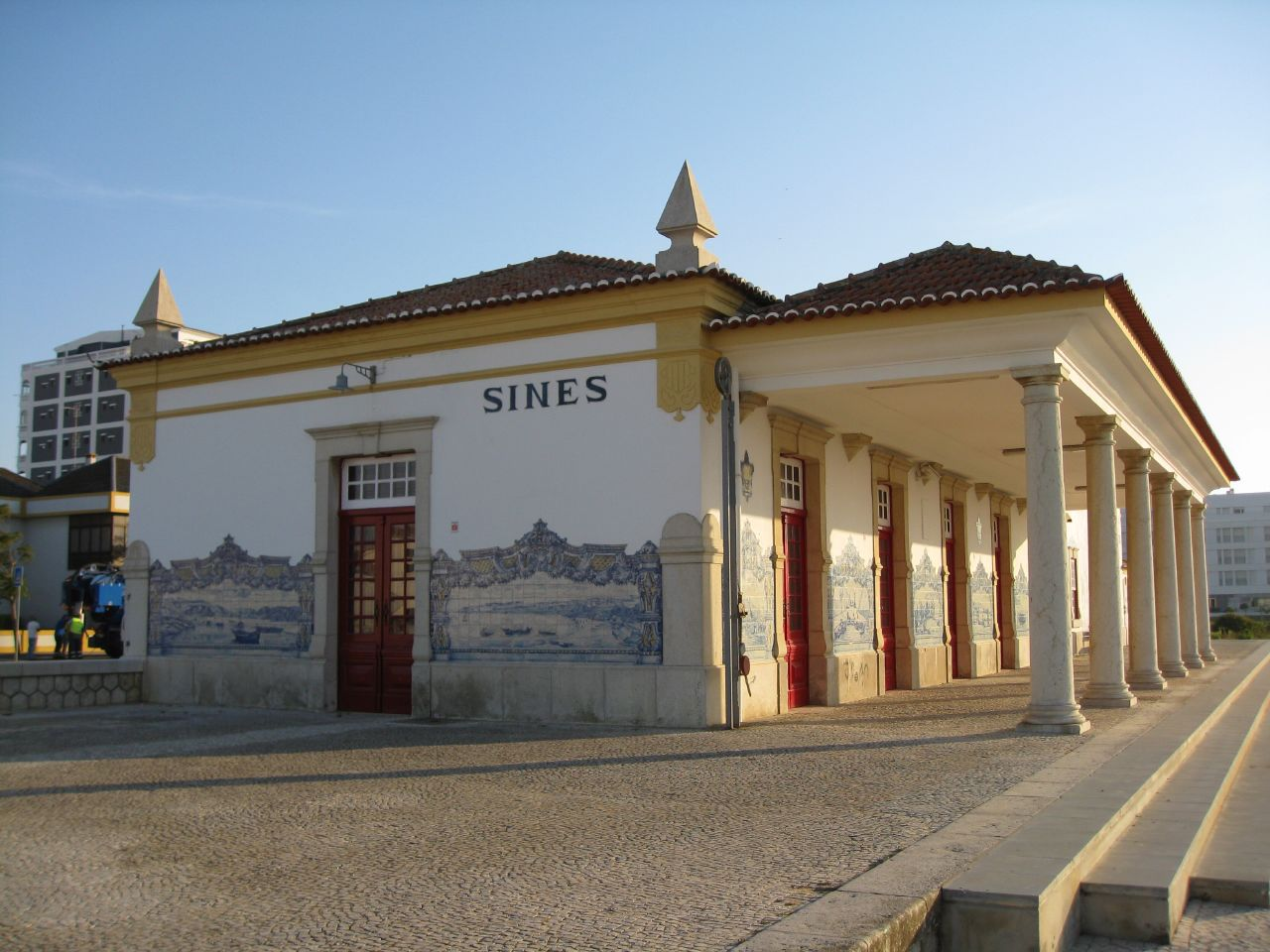
- Sines railway station

Overview
- Status: Closed
- Termini: Ortiga; Sines railway station

Technical
- Line length: 11.4 km (7.1 mi)
- Track gauge: 1,668 mm (5 ft 5 21/32 in) Iberian gauge

Ramal de Sines is a closed railway branch line which connected the stations of Ortiga, on the Linha de Sines, and Sines, in Portugal. It was opened 14 September 1936.

== See also ==
- List of railway lines in Portugal
- History of rail transport in Portugal
