= Miróbriga =

Iron Age and Roman site in Portugal

Mirobriga
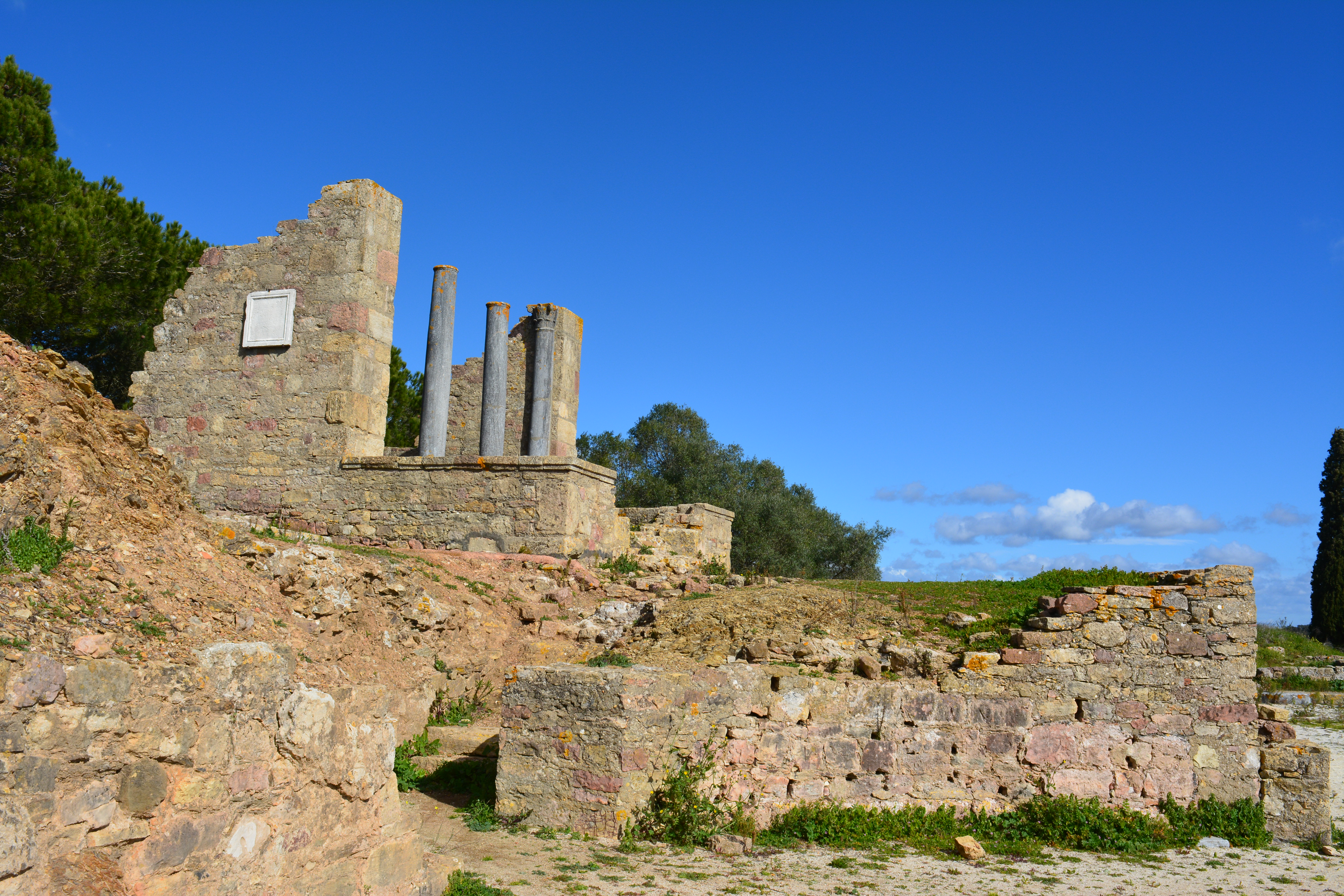
- The ruins of the main temple at the forum
- Interactive map of the Mirobriga area
- Alternative names: Castelo Velho de Santiago do Cacém Termas de São Brás Herdade dos Chãos Salgados

General information
- Type: Roman ruins
- Architectural style: Roman
- Location: Santiago do Cacém, Portugal
- Coordinates: 38°0′34.88″N 8°41′1.74″W
- Owner: Portuguese Republic

Technical details
- Material: Stone

Website
- http://mirobriga.drealentejo.pt/

Mirobriga or Mirobriga of the Celts (Mirobrigensis qui celtici cognominantur - Plin. Nat. IV 118) was an ancient town in the westernmost part of Lusitania during the Iron Age and Roman Times that was mentioned by Pliny the Elder and Ptolemy.

Despite some debate, the city is generally associated with the archaeological site of Castelo Velho de Santiago do Cacém (Herdade dos Chão Salgados) located near the village and civil parish of Santiago do Cacém, in the municipality of the same name in the south-west of Portugal.

The ruins were first mentioned by André de Resende in the 16th century, who also made the association with the toponym. The site is also known as Roman ruins of Mirobriga and Roman city of Mirobriga.

Archeology revealed that the site has been occupied since the Iron Age, at least since the 5th/4th century BCE, but possibly going back to the 9th century BCE, by Proto-Indo-Europeans.

With the Roman colonization came the need to administrate the new incorporated territories. As such, in some cases cities were created anew while in others, existing indigenous settlements were transformed to meet the requirements. The original settlement developed into a city in Roman times, and was occupied until the Early Middle Ages.

The Forum occupied almost the entire area of the previous settlement, and around it a commercial area was developed.

The two Balneae or Thermae, set side-by-side, are among the best preserved in Portugal. Several domestic buildings have been identified in the last decades, mostly consisting of peristyle houses.

Relatively close to the baths, there is a bridge with a single arch.

The Circus, the only one whose entire ground plan is completely known in Portugal, is located further from the centre, approximately 500m to the south.

== History ==
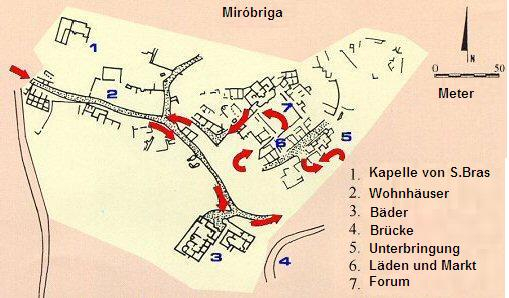
The layout of Mirobriga showing the chapel of São Brás (1), residential villas (2), thermae (3), bridge (4), accommodations (5), market (6) and forum (7)

=== Iron Age ===
The name of Castelo Velho (portuguese for Old Castle) is a recurrent folk toponym for ancient sites and ruins, usually referring to pre-Roman settlements. Material culture indicates a strong continental celtic influence, and, if this is the site of ancient Mirobriga, the suffix -briga is a further indicator of the Celtic ethnic-cultural nature of the inhabitants.

The current state of the investigation suggests that the earliest occupation may go back to the 9th century BCE. The known structures to date however, only go as far as the 4th–3rd century BCE.

This settlement is thought to have occupied only the hill of Castelo Velho and its slopes, an area of about 11,800 m^{2.}

Because investigation has mainly focused on the Roman remains, the Iron Age occupation of the site is still largely unknown. Only one building has been excavated. It is usually referred to as the "Celtic temple", although its sacred function is still debated and could have equally been a domestic building.

In Roman times the forum occupied almost the entire hill, possibly destroying the previous settlement.

=== Roman period ===
By about the second half of the 1st century Roman occupation began, expanding the site and occupying an area of 28,000 m^{2}. At this time the thermal baths and paved road along the southeast were constructed, reflecting the Flavian economic prosperity. Around the first half of the 2nd century, the construction of the Oriental baths and hippodrome was begun, followed by the second phase of construction in the second half of the 2nd century and 3rd century.

Around the second half of the 2nd century, there were signs of abandon, that may reflect the period of political crisis caused by barbarian invasions during this period. By the end of the 4th century, there is a marked reduction in the population, although a level of continuity persisted on the site: primarily around the small Chapel of São Brás.

== Architecture ==
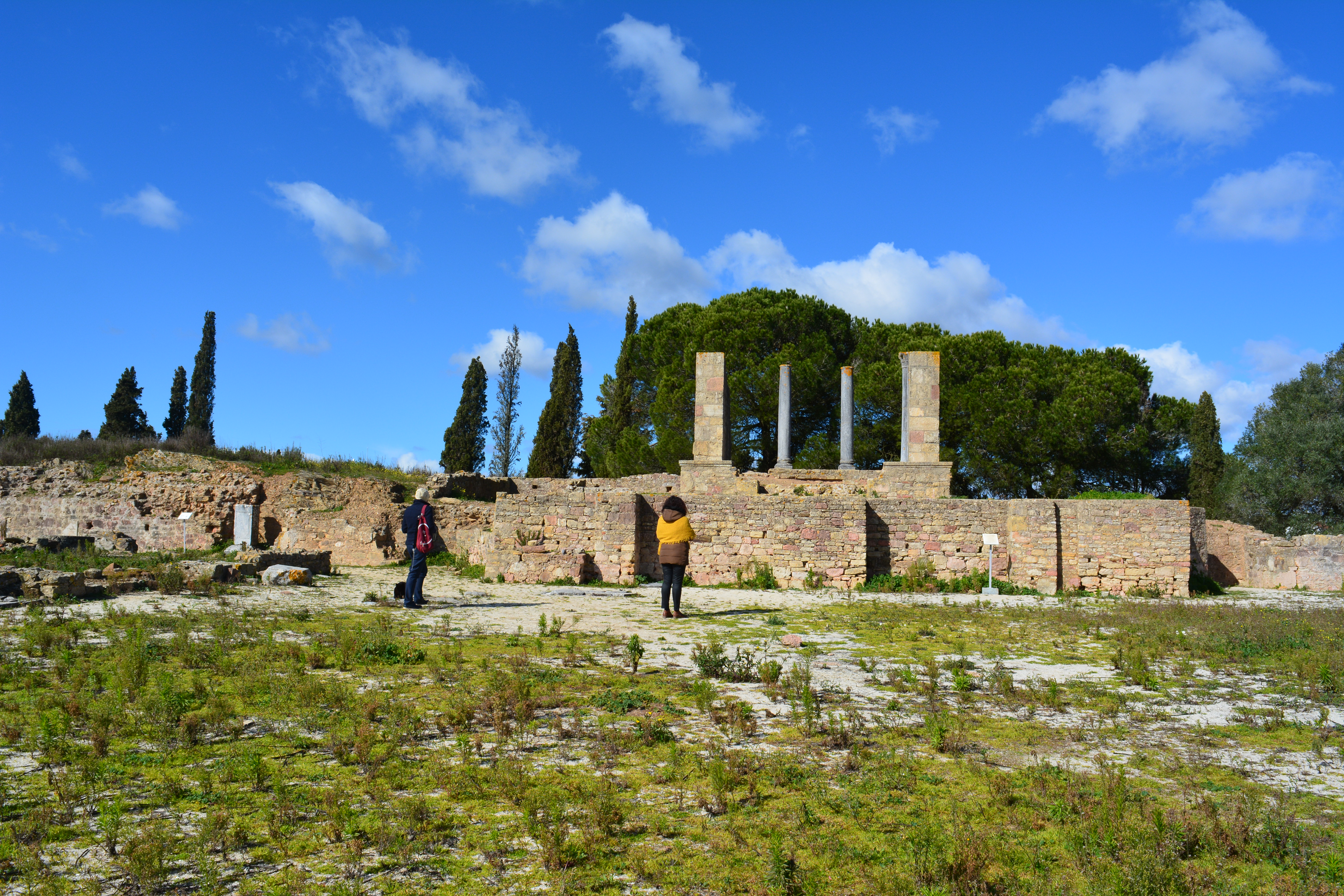
Forum area

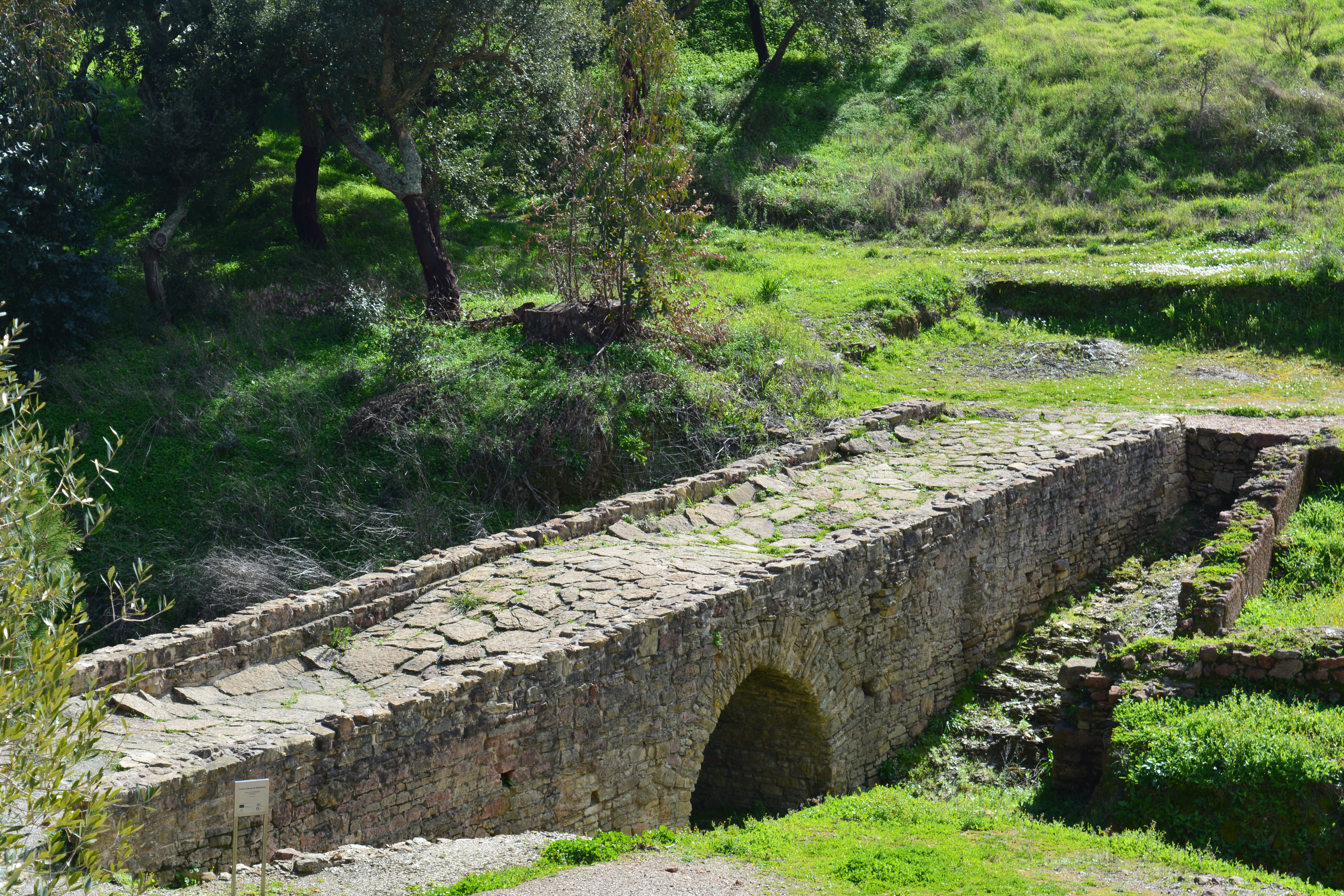
Small, single-arch bridge

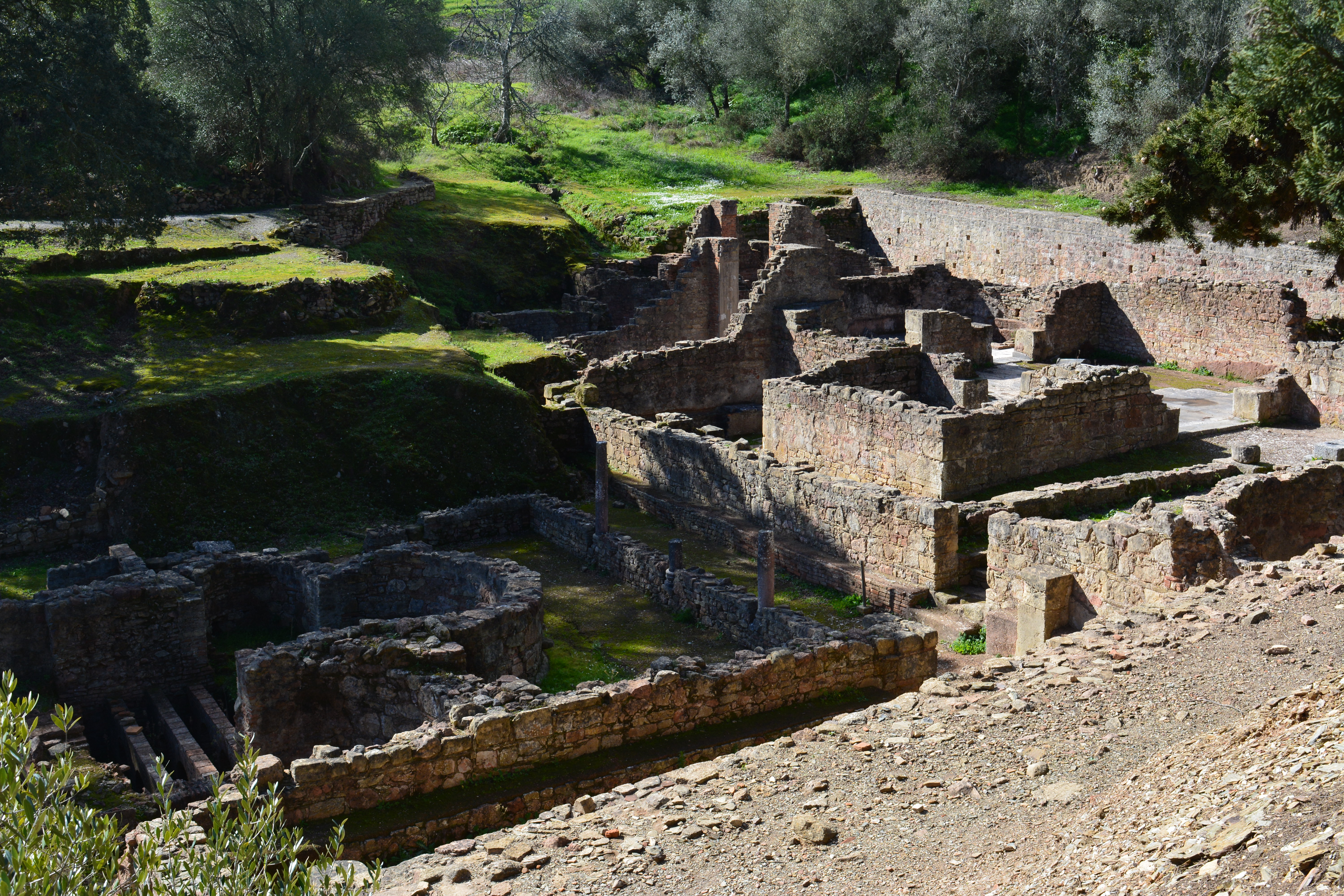
A partial view of the Thermae

Castelo Velho hill (245 metres) dominates the site that is one kilometre north-west from the urban centre of modern Santiago do Cacém, which overlooks the northern plain of Chãos Salgados. Miróbriga is situated in a privileged location, on the ancient roadways of the region with access to the coast. Within close proximity is the Windmill of Cumeadas.

=== Forum ===
To the east of the baths is a small, single-arch bridge (at 38.00926°N 8.6836°W), that provided access along the west–east access that leads to the Forum (at 38.01042°N 8.68393°W), an Imperial temple (to worship the Roman Emperors) and a temple dedicated to Venus. Between these two are the remains of an older temple dedicated to the local divinity. North of the forum are the ruins of the market and the visitor's houses, separated by another road.

=== Baths ===
The settlement is structured around Roman roads with many paved accesses. Around the west–east axis are the ruins of the residential homes. To the east, are the former baths constructed over a canal and composed of two buildings in a "L" shape ("Western Baths" and "Eastern Baths", at 38.00932°N 8.68407°W). Each building has an entry into the massage hall, a gymnasium, changing room, the bathing space, which included the frigidarium (cold baths, tepidarium (warm baths) and caldarium (hot baths), and a communal latrine. The halls are warmed by a hypocaust system that heated the floors of baths, which was located in the south part of the buildings. It was a subterranean system formed by pillars and arches, with tile, that allowed the circulation of warm air to produce heated environments, supported by kilns.

=== Circus ===
The Circus, located at 38.00224°N 8.68369°W, was a rectangular space with curved seating on the northern end, while segmented seat on the south, used for chariot or horse races. It was a 370 metre by 75 metre space, bisected by a spine with posts on either end and a triumphal arch on the south entrance.

== Protection of the site ==
On 1 June 1992, the Instituto Português do Património Arquitectónico (IPPAR) (forerunner of Institute for the Management of Architectural and Archaeological Heritage took over the management of the site, by Decree-Law No.106F/92. This was followed in 1996-1997 by the acquisition of the lands that surrounded the site, as part of the ZEP-Zona de Protecção Especial (Special Protection Zone) designation.

On 1 February 1999, a dispatch (No.180/99) from the Ministries of Equipment, Planning and Territory Administration, Ministry of the Environment and the Ministry of Culture, recognized the importance of safeguarding the Roman ruins, and authorized the construction of an Interpretative Centre.

The project began in 2000, in a project designed by architect Paula Santos, that included a 700 m^{2} space. The Interpretative Centre (the most recent addition) is located on an elevated area at the entrance to the site, with several paths leading away from this site into the ruins.

== Gallery ==
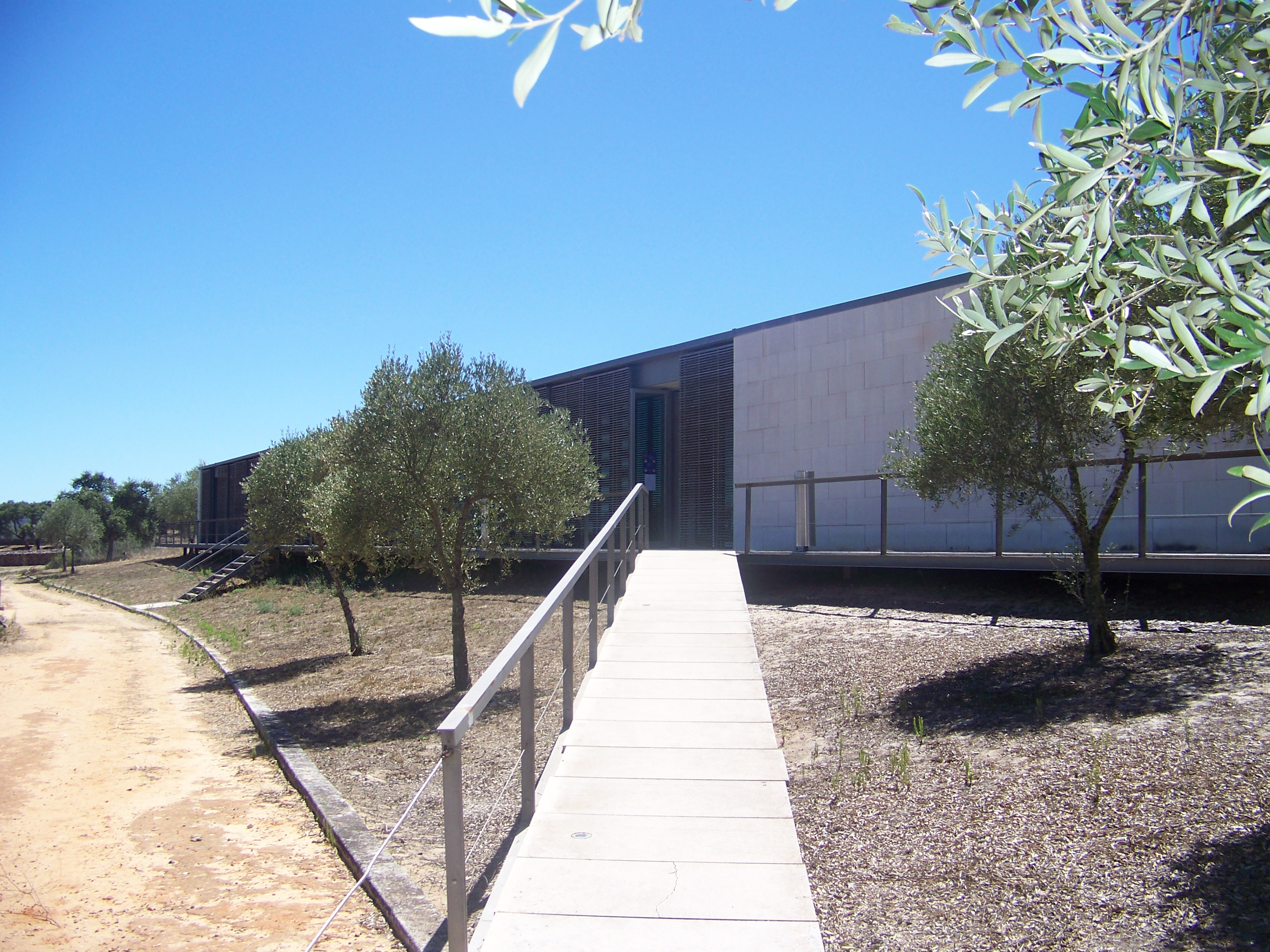
Mirobriga's interpretative center

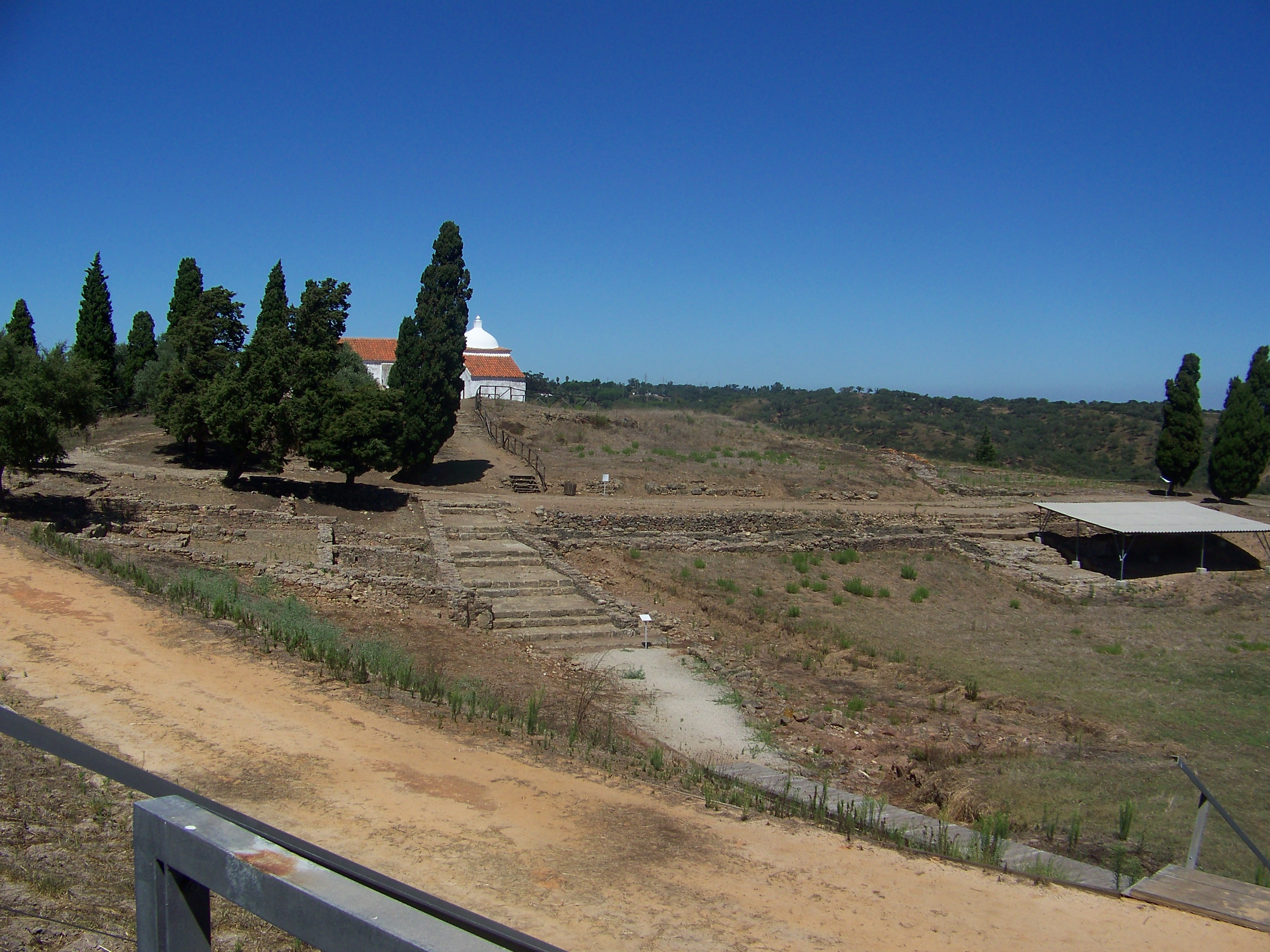
View of Mirobriga's residential area

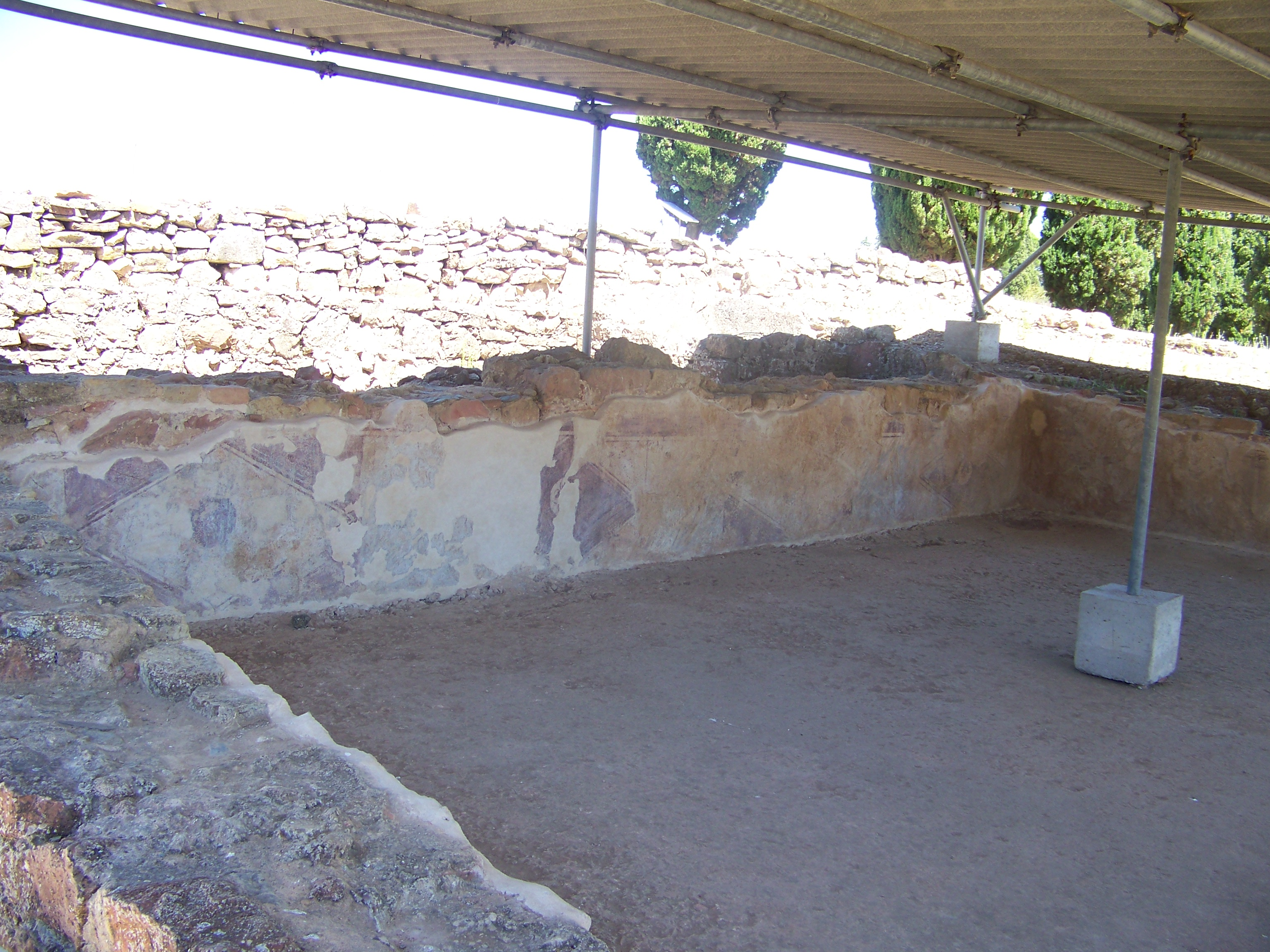
Frescos covering the walls of a Mirobriga house

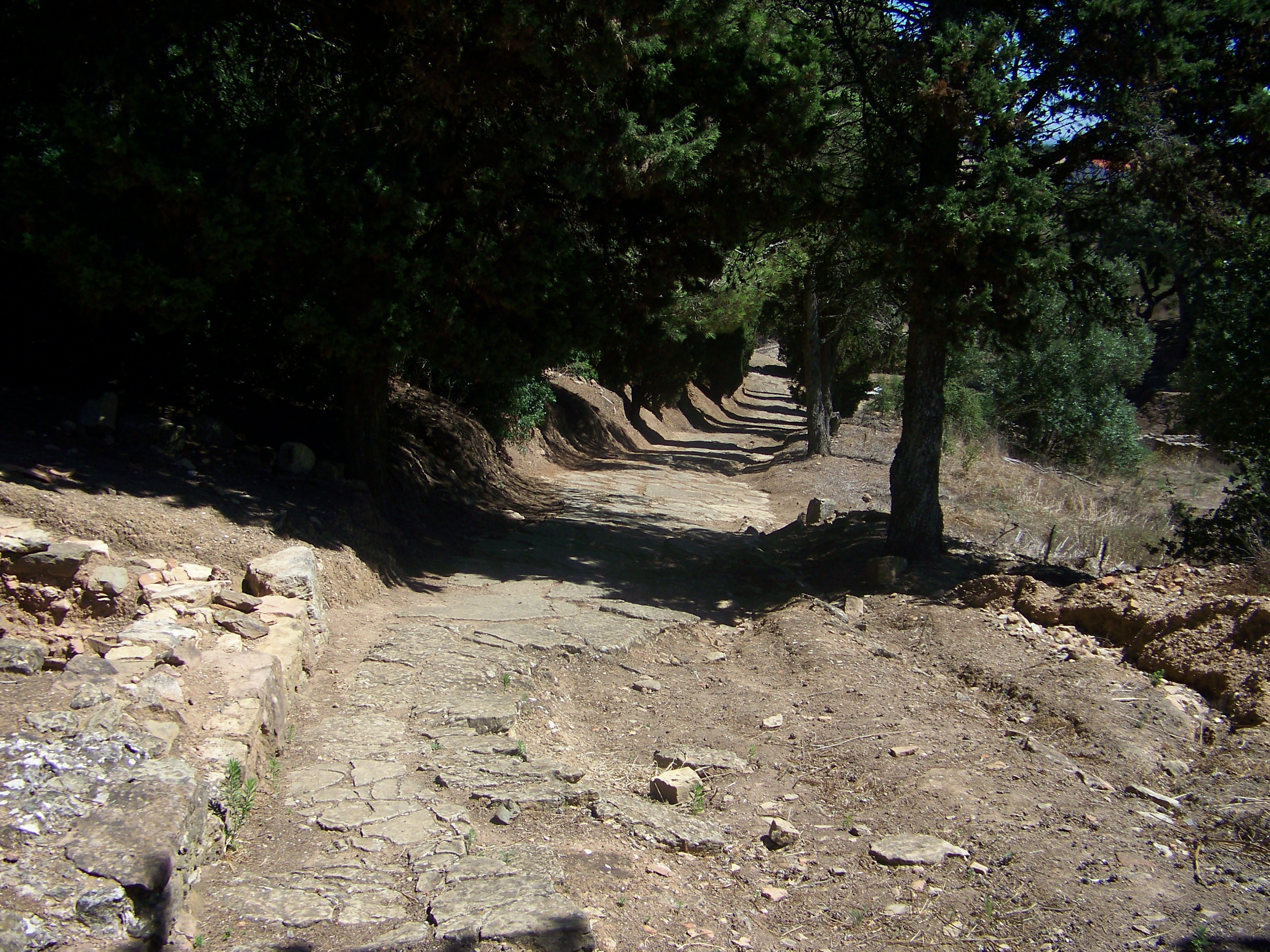
Stone-paved street leading to the baths

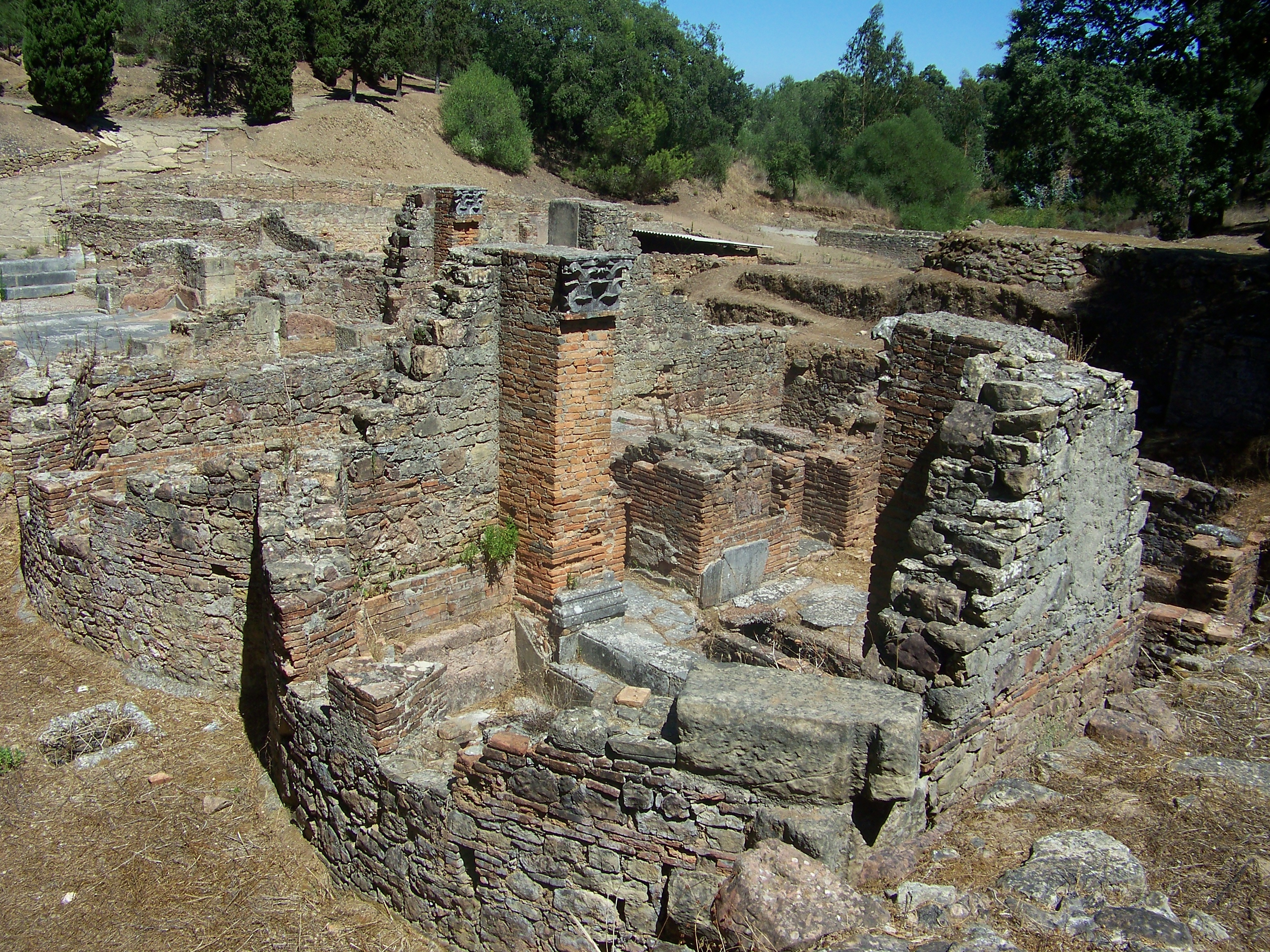
Rear view of a caldarium (hot room), East Baths

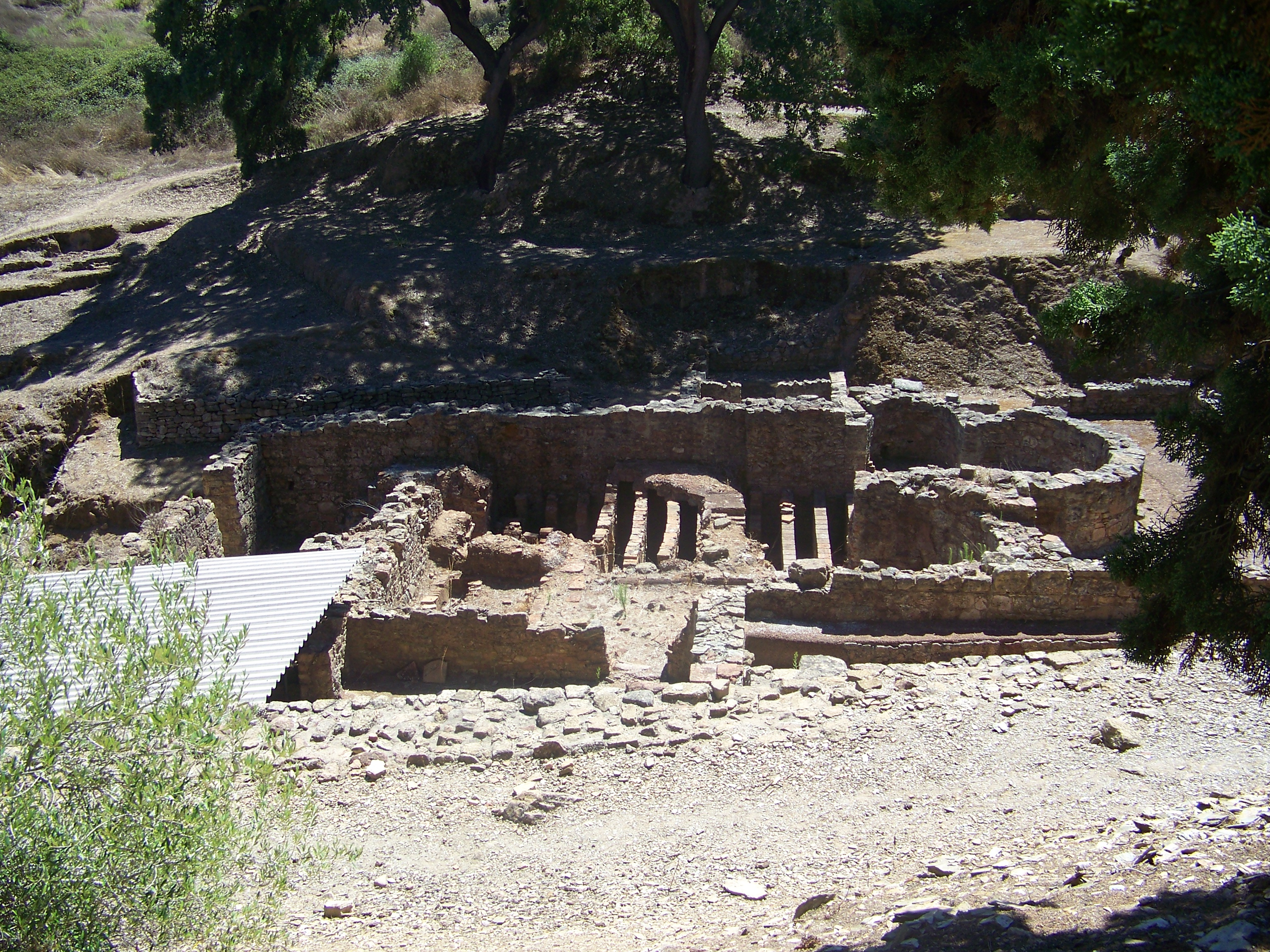
Side view of a caldarium (hot room), West Baths

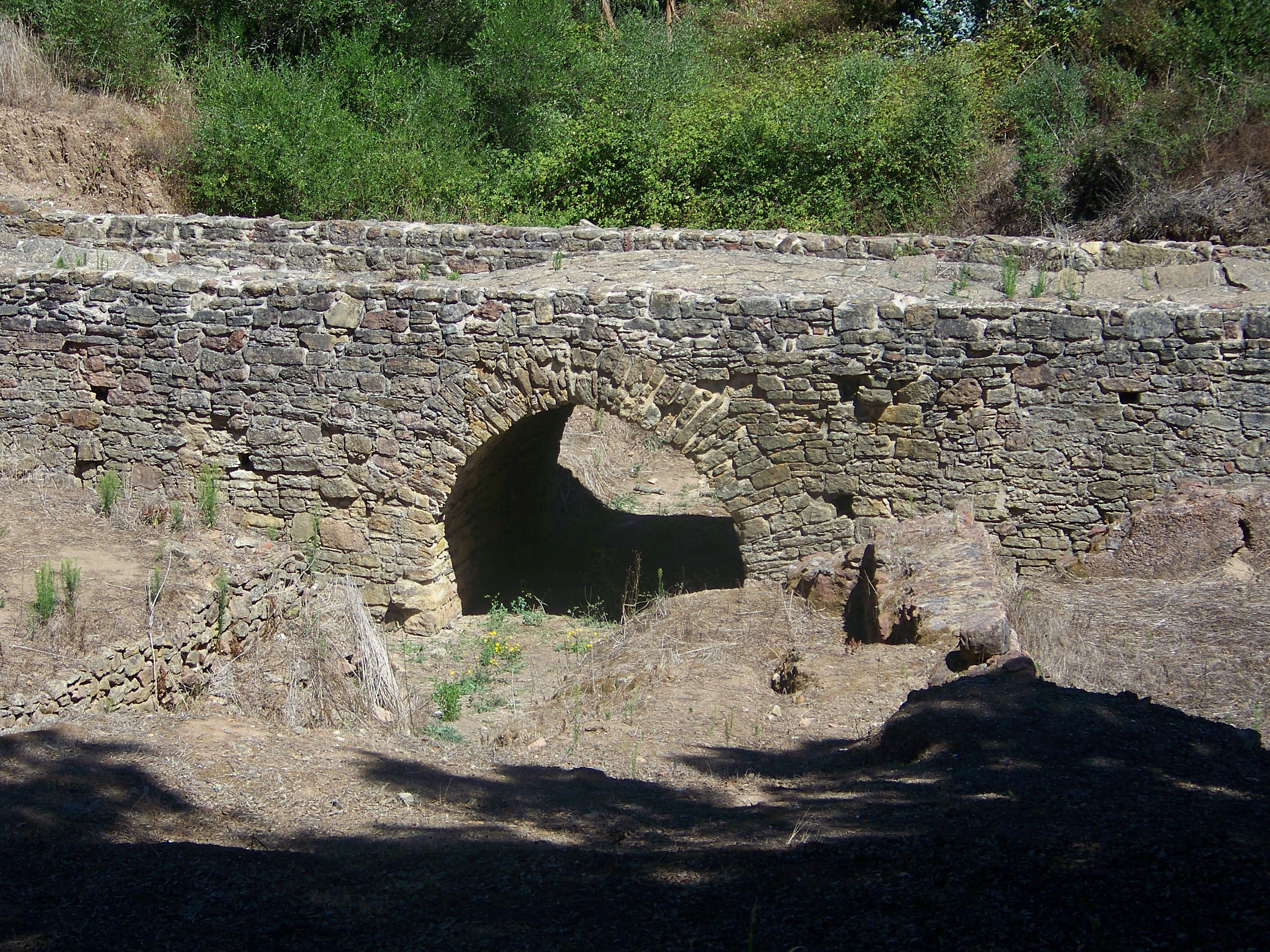
Bridge near the baths

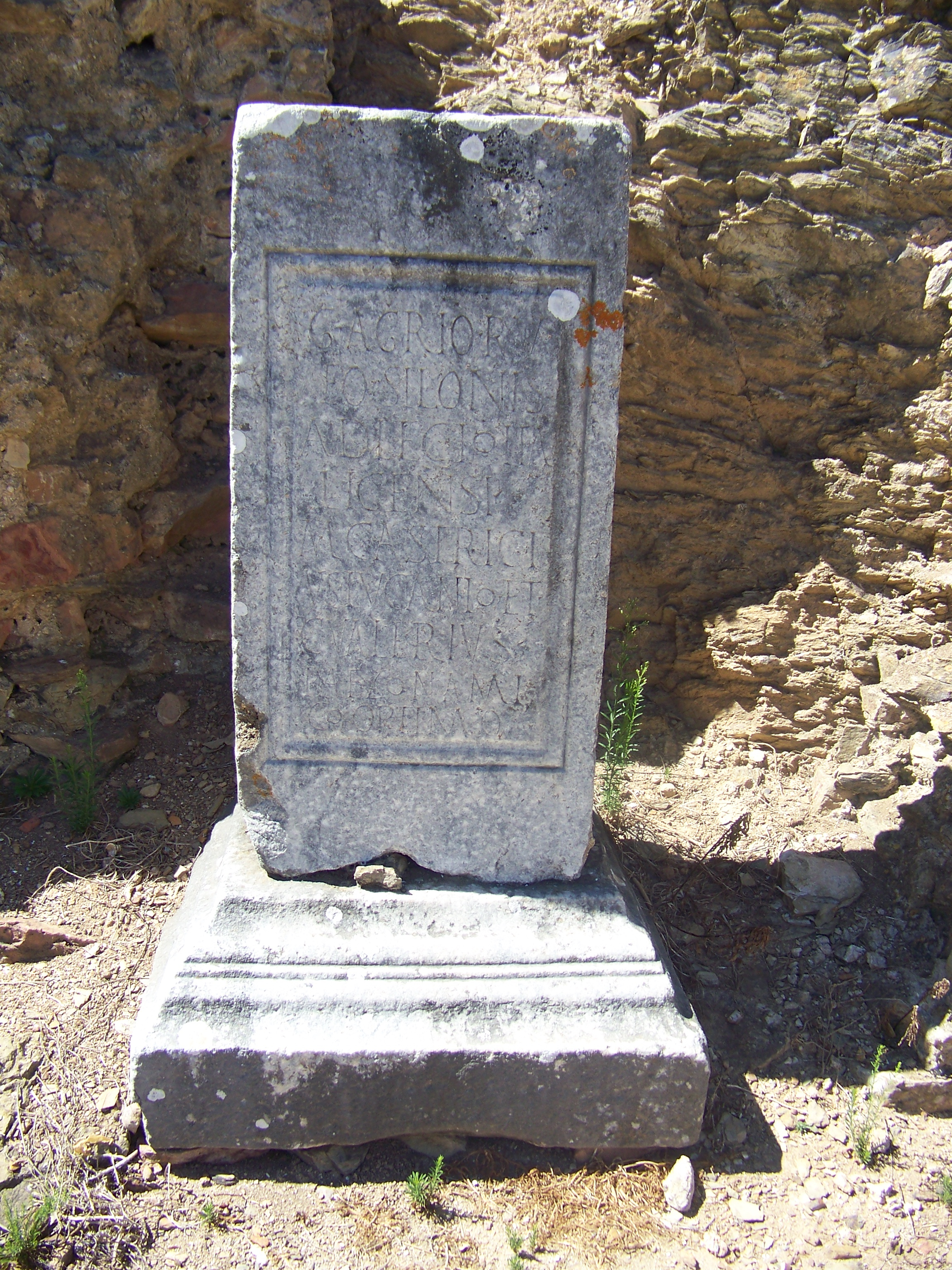
Inscription dedicated to a citizen of Italica

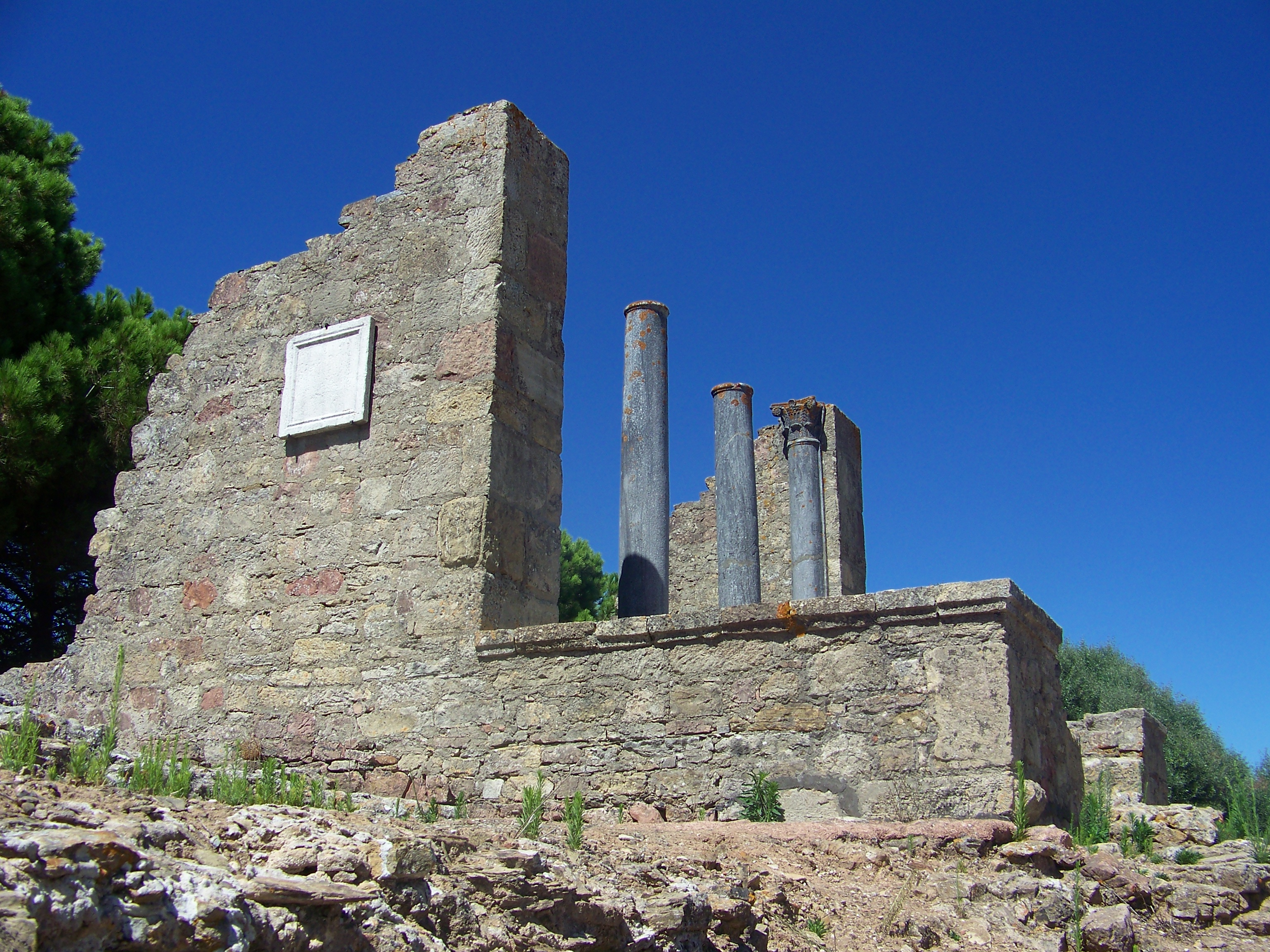
Imperial cult temple in the Forum

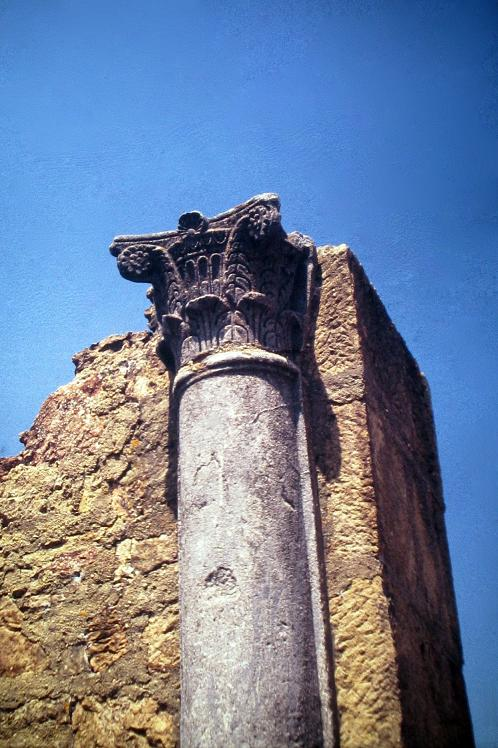
Decorative detail (imperial temple)

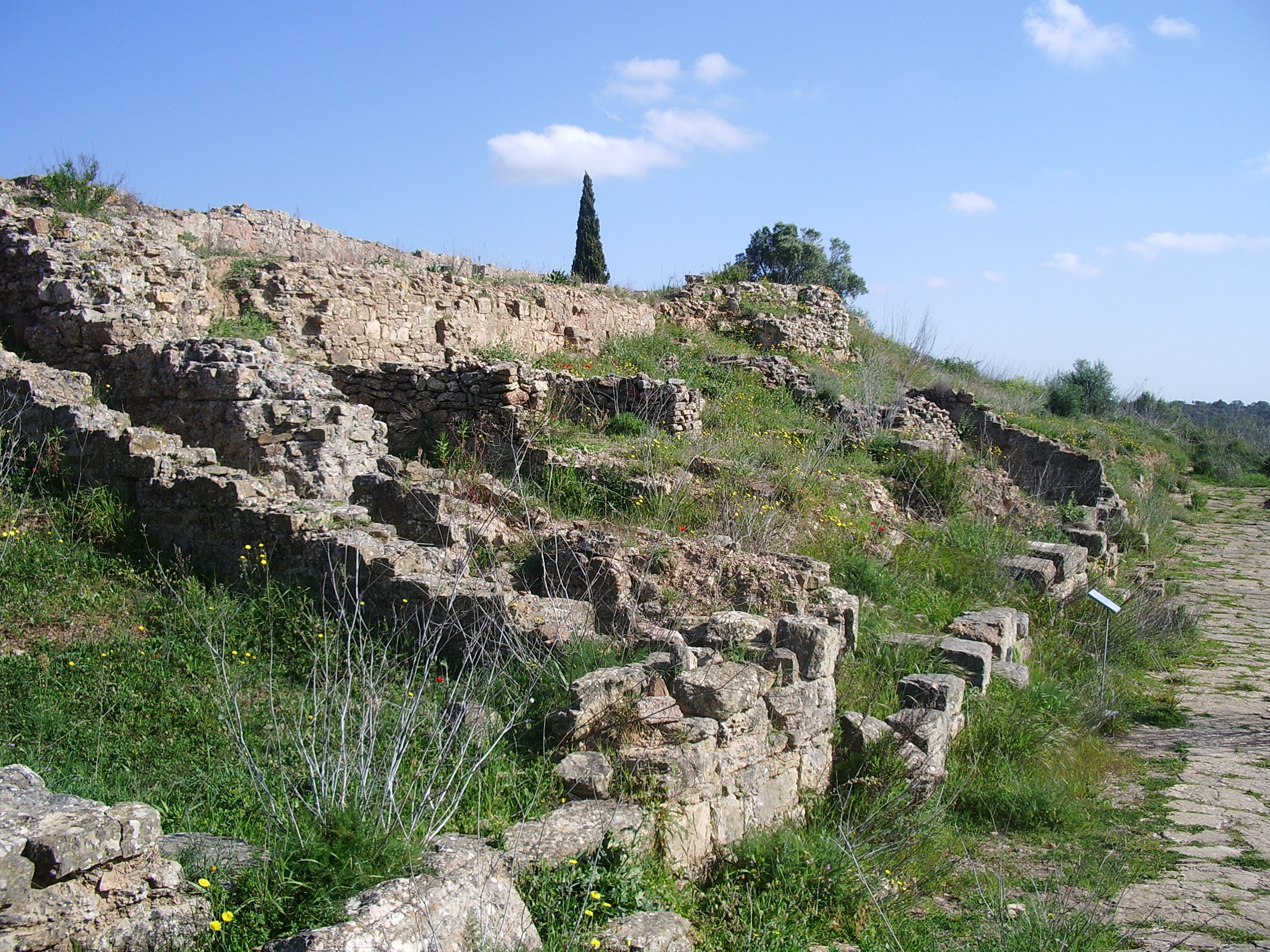
Shops along the path leading to the forum

== See also ==
- Lusitania
- Sines (the bay of Sines was used as port by the civitas of Mirobriga)
