= Port of Sines =

Largest artificial port in Portugal

Port of Sines Porto de Sines
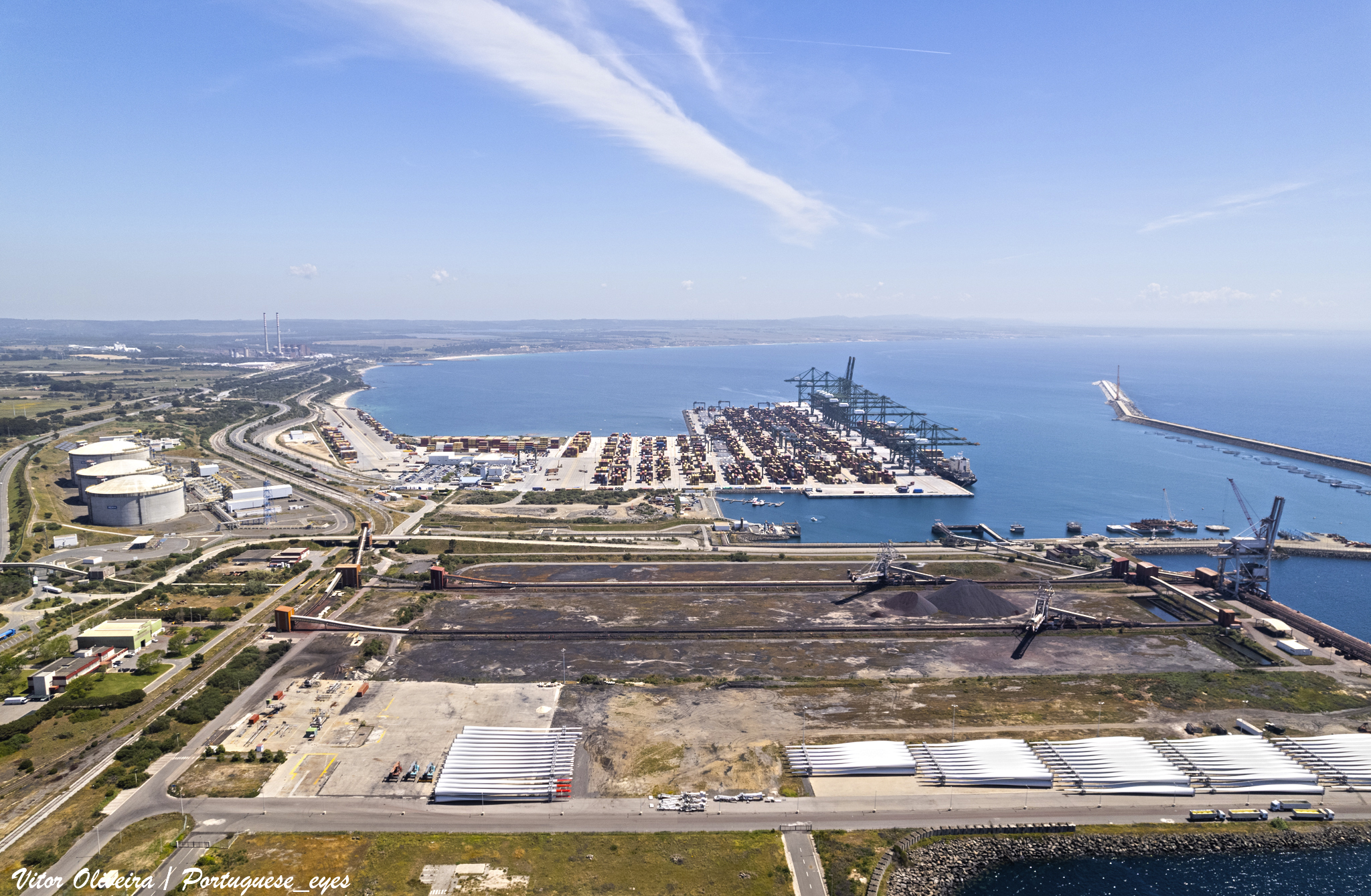
- Interactive map of Port of Sines; Porto de Sines

Location
- Country: Portugal
- Location: Sines
- UN/LOCODE: PTSIE

Details
- Opened: 1978
- Operated by: APS
- Owned by: Portuguese state

Statistics
- Annual cargo tonnage: 42,100,000 tonnes (2025)
- Annual container volume: 1,700,000 TEU (2025)
- Website; Official Website

The Port of Sines is the largest artificial port in Portugal, and a deep water port, natural backgrounds to -28 m ZH with specialized terminals that allow the movement of different types of goods. Besides being the main port on the Atlantic seaboard of Portugal due to its geophysical characteristics, is the main gateway to the energy supply of Portugal: container, natural gas, coal, oil and its derivatives. Construction started in 1973 and it came into operation in 1978. The Port of Sines Administration (Administração do Porto de Sines, APS) was created on 14 December 1977. The port operates 365 days a year, 24 hours a day, providing services such as: control of maritime traffic; pilotage, towage and mooring; access control and surveillance; drinking water and bunkers; prevent accidents/pollution; repairs on board or ashore.

== Location and hinterland ==
The Port of Sines is located on the Southwest of Europe, 58 nautical miles (107 km) south from Lisbon, on the cross of the main international maritime routes – East-West and North-South. (Latitude: 37° 57′ N Longitude: 08° 53′ W)

The Port of Sines direct hinterland comprises all the south and midland part of Portugal. It is located at 150 km from Lisbon, 125 km from Évora, 100 km from Beja and 182 km from Faro.

Users of the port can interact with all the authorities and port services through a single communication channel.

== Terminals ==
=== Liquid Bulk Terminal ===
The Liquid Bulk Terminal (TGLS), inaugurated in 1978, is the largest liquid bulk terminal in the country. With six jetties and natural beds down to 28 metres ZH, it has the capacity to receive vessels up to 350,000 tones Dwt, and allows the simultaneous handling of different products (crude, refined products, liquefied gases and other liquid bulks). This terminal is operated by CLT – Companhia Logística de Terminais Marítimos.

=== Petrochemical Terminal ===
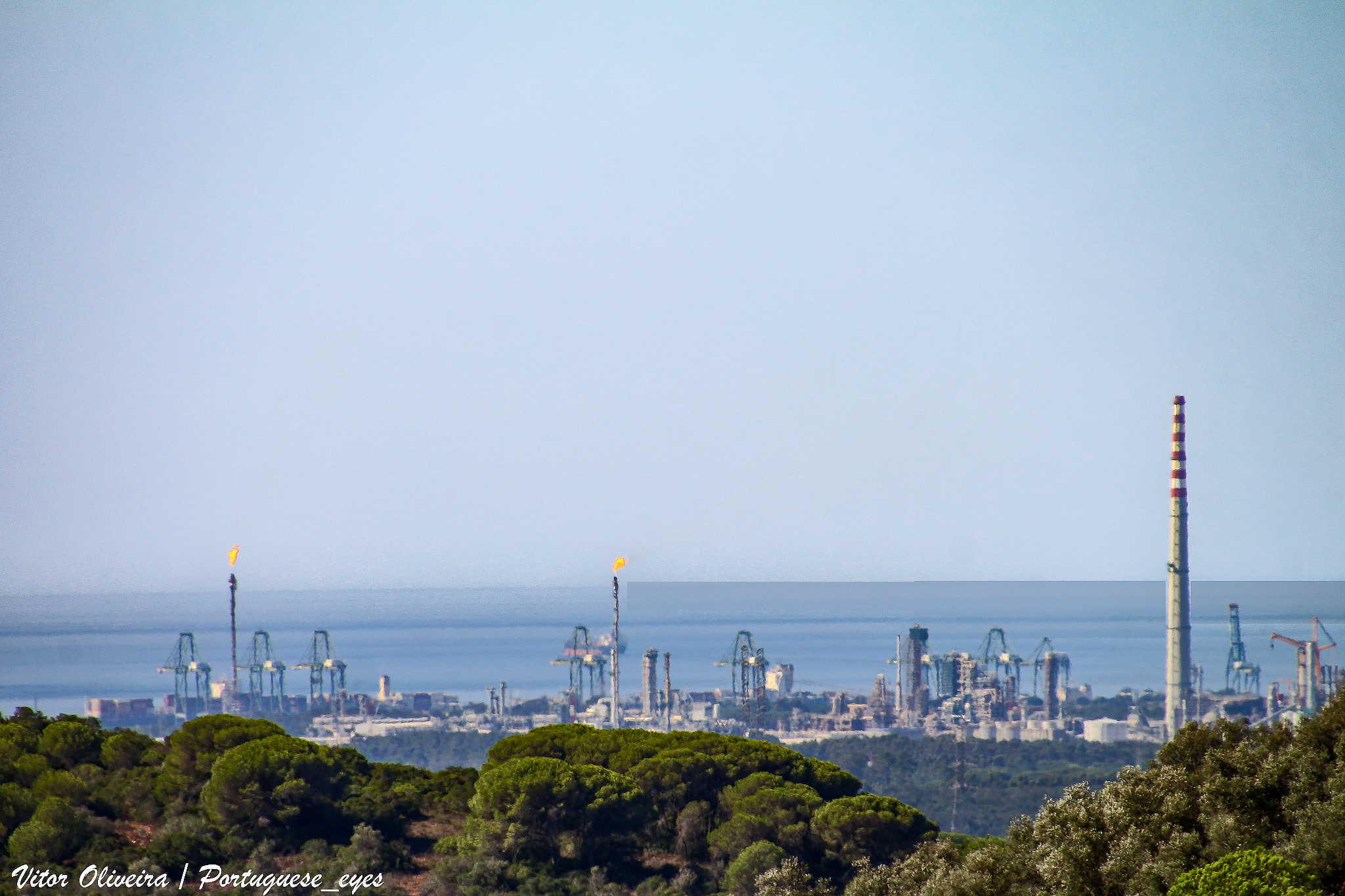
Oil refinery with the Port in the background

Since 1981 the Port of Sines has a terminal dedicated to petrochemical products, which allows the handling of goods via a dedicated pipeline between vessels and the petrochemical complex located in the ZILS – Sines Industrial and Logistics Area of Sines. This terminal is run by Repsol Polímeros.

=== Multipurpose Terminal ===
The Sines Multipurpose Terminal came on line in 1992 under a public service concession granted to the company Portsines. It is geared towards handling solid bulk, general cargo and ro-ro. It has 4 berths with a total length of 645 metres at the extrados and 296 meters at the intrados. With depths going down to 18 metres ZH, this allows the reception of ships up to 190,000 tonnes Dwt.

=== LNG Terminal ===
The Liquefied Natural Gas Terminal started in 2003 and is run under a private use concession by the company REN Atlântico, today handling over 60% of the natural gas consumed in Portugal. Equipped with one jetty with beds of 15 metres ZH, it allows the reception of LNG tankers up to 216,000 cubic metres.

=== Container Terminal – Terminal XXI ===
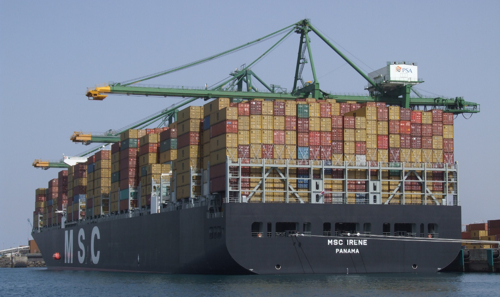
14.000 TEU vessel at the Terminal XXI

The Sines Container Terminal, called Terminal XXI, started its operations in 2004 under a public service concession by the company PSA Sines (PSA, a global port operator, formerly the Port of Singapore Authority) and Terminal Investment Limited (TiL).

Terminal XXI provides beds of 16 metres ZH, allowing the mooring of large container ships from intercontinental routes and of the ships with the respective connections by feeder.

The open sea port is sheltered by two breakwaters – West Breakwater (2.000 m N-S orientation) and the East Breakwater (2.200 m NW-SE orientation).

The Port of Sines and the Industrial and Logistics Zone offer road and rail connections directly linked to the terminals. Links to both the Portuguese and Spanish hinterland (IC33 – Sines/Évora/Spain; IP8 – Sines/Beja/Spain; and rail connection Sines/Elvas/Spain) are planned.

The land allocated to the development of the ZAL at Sines covers two areas: one situated in the intra-port zone and the other one in the extra-port zone

The fishing harbour is formed by an inner basin sheltered by a breakwater.

== See also ==
- List of deep water ports
- Transport in Portugal
