= Ermidas-Sado =

- Civil parish
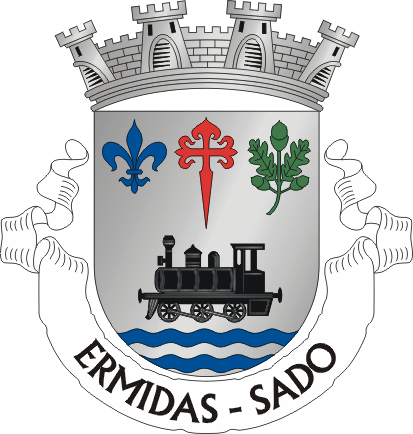
- Coat of arms

- Location in Portugal
- Coordinates: 38.01°N 8.41°W
- Country: Portugal
- Region: Alentejo
- Intermunic. comm.: Alentejo Litoral
- District: Setúbal
- Municipality: Santiago do Cacém

Area
  - Total: 82.40 km^{2} (31.81 sq mi)

Population (2011)
  - Total: 2,020
  - Density: 25/km^{2} (63/sq mi)
- Time zone: UTC+00:00 (WET)
  - Summer (DST): UTC+01:00 (WEST)

Ermidas-Sado is a civil parish in the municipality of Santiago do Cacém, Portugal. The population in 2011 was 2,020, in an area of 82.40 km^{2}.
