= Barreiro railway station =

Station in Lisbon, Portugal

Barreiro
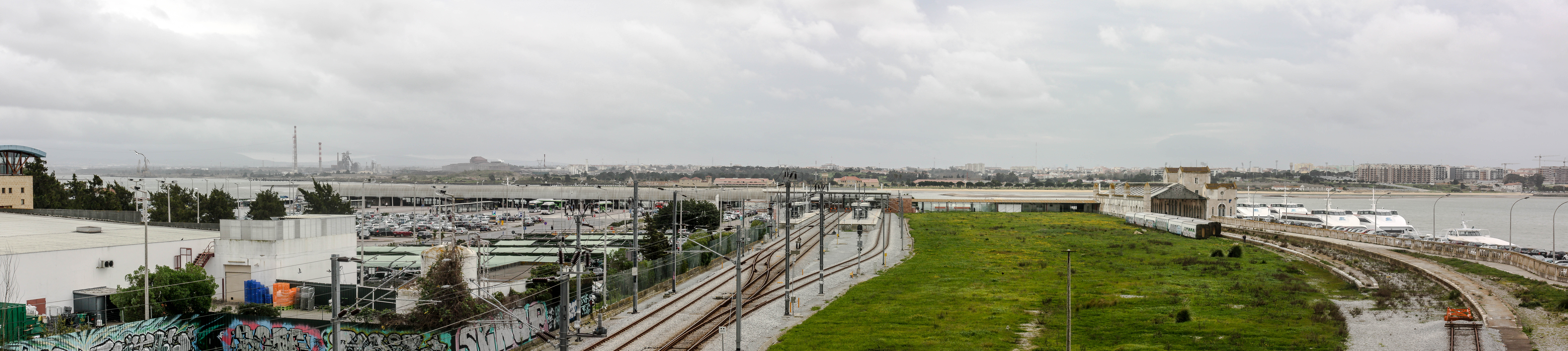
- Bus terminal and the old station in 2020

General information
- Location: Lisbon; Portugal
- Coordinates: 38°39′10″N 9°4′45″W
- Elevation: 10 m (33 ft)
- Manager: Infraestruturas de Portugal
- Line: Alentejo line

Other information
- Station code: 95000 BAO
- Website: https://www.cp.pt/passageiros/pt/consultar-horarios/estacoes/barreiro

History
- Opened: 1st station: 1861; 2nd station: 1884; 3rd station: 2008

Services
Preceding station	Lisbon CP	Following station
Barreiro-A towards Praias do Sado-A	Sado Line	Terminus
Barreiro-A towards Setúbal	Sado Line	Terminus
Location

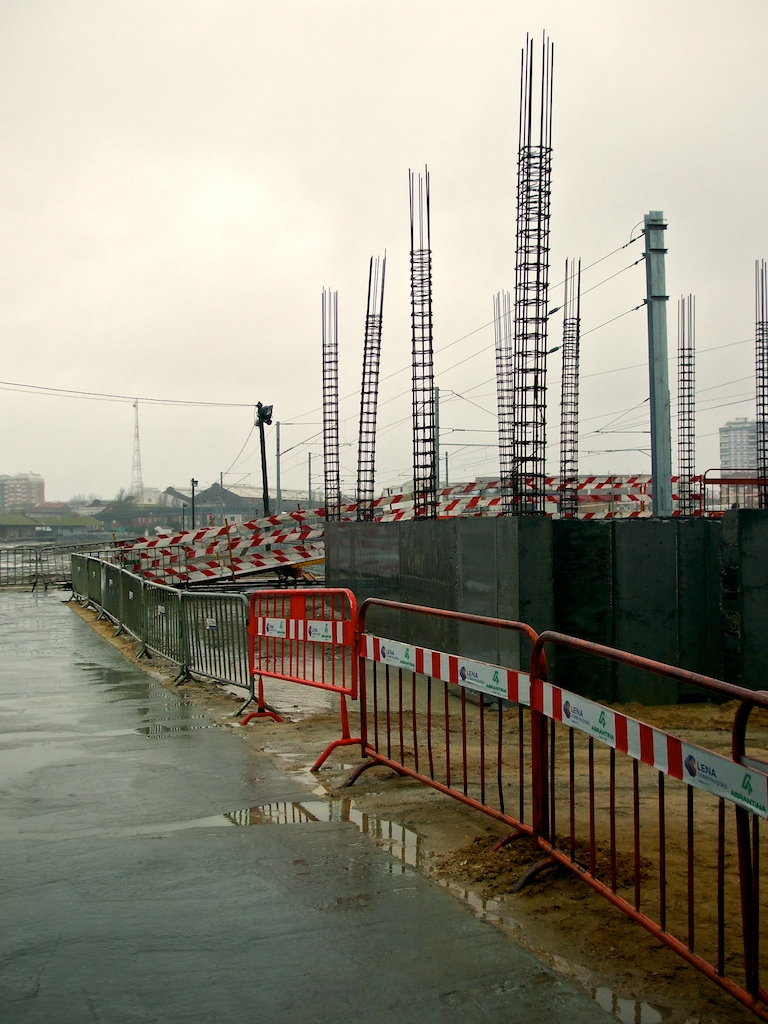
The third Barreiro station in 2008, on the eve of its inauguration.

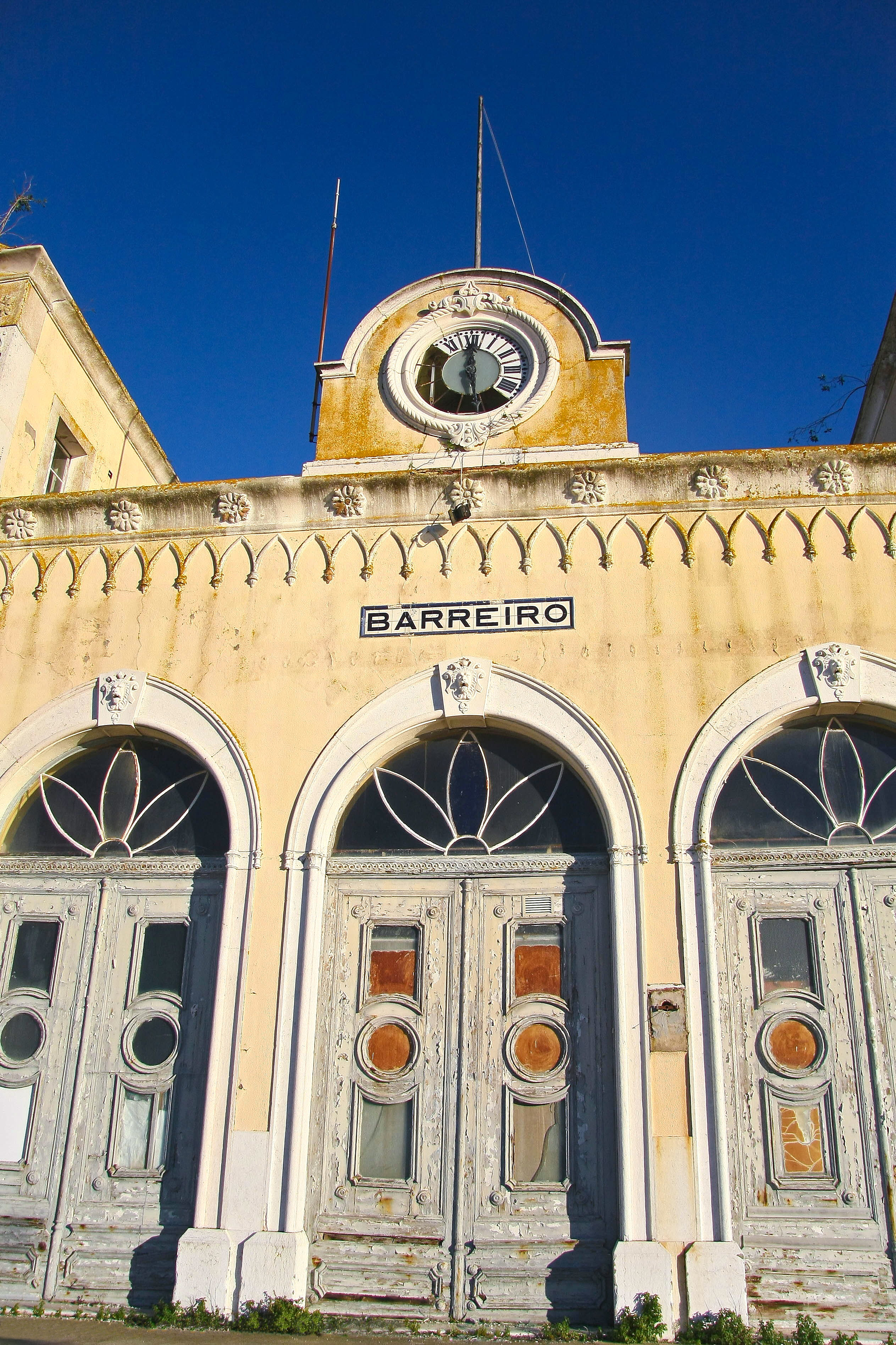
Façade in 2020.

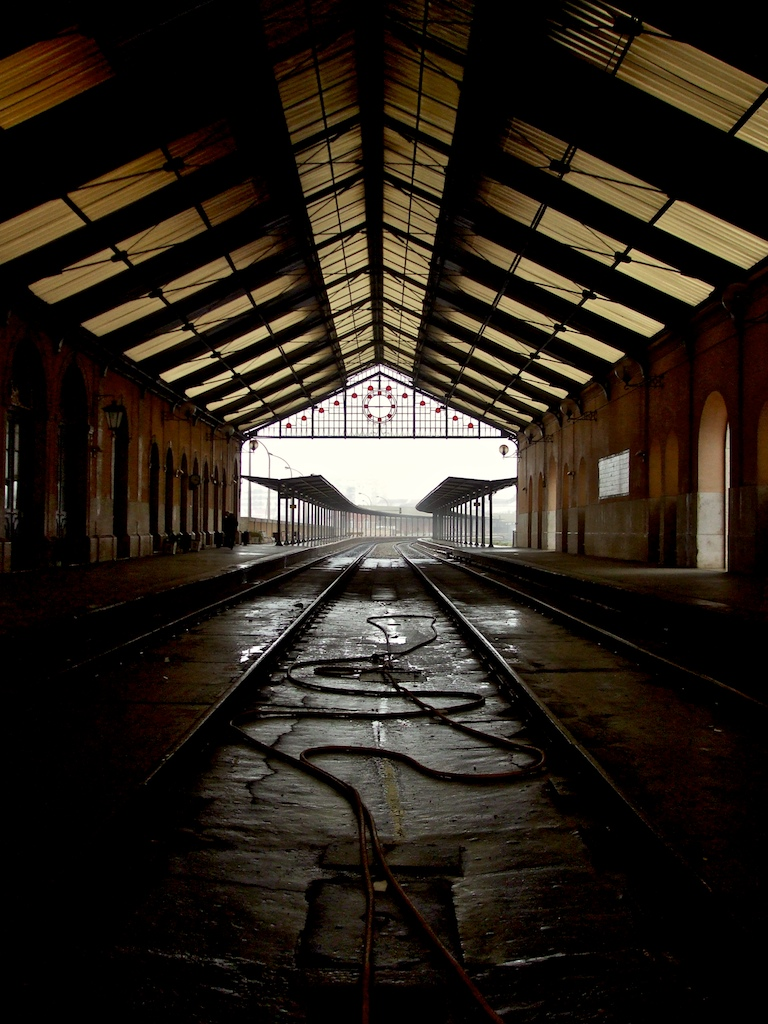
Remains of the abandoned building that served as the Barreiro station between 1884 and 2008.

Barreiro is a railway station on the Alentejo Line that serves as a connection between rail services on the South Bank of the Tagus and Soflusa's river transport to Lisbon, Portugal. The first Barreiro station began operating on June 15, 1857, although it was not inaugurated until February 1, 1861. Since it was too far from the river pier, a new station was built and inaugurated in 1884. This station included an important workshop hub, which underwent extension work during the 1900s, but the facilities were becoming insufficient for the demand by the following decade. However, political and social instability, which was reflected in the administration of the railroads, dragged out the process. It was not until the 1930s that the new workshops were completed. Meanwhile, in 1923 the Ramal do Seixal branch line went into service, and in 1935 the railway between Barreiro and Lavradio was duplicated. The Barreiro station was remodeled and expanded in 1943, and in the 1950s the workshops began to house diesel locomotives from other lines that had been electrified. On December 14, 2008, a new Barreiro station was inaugurated, and the old one was closed.

== Operations ==
=== Services ===
The station is used by services of the Sado Line, provided by the operator Comboios de Portugal.

=== Tracks and platforms ===
In January 2011, the railway station had three tracks, all 102m long and 90 cm high.

=== Location and access ===
The facility is located in the city of Barreiro, next to de Sapadores Avenue. 24 lines pass through the station; 7 lines of the Carris Metropolitana and 17 of the Transportes Coletivos do Barreiro (TCB), connecting this station to other destinations in the Setúbal Peninsula.

=== First station ===
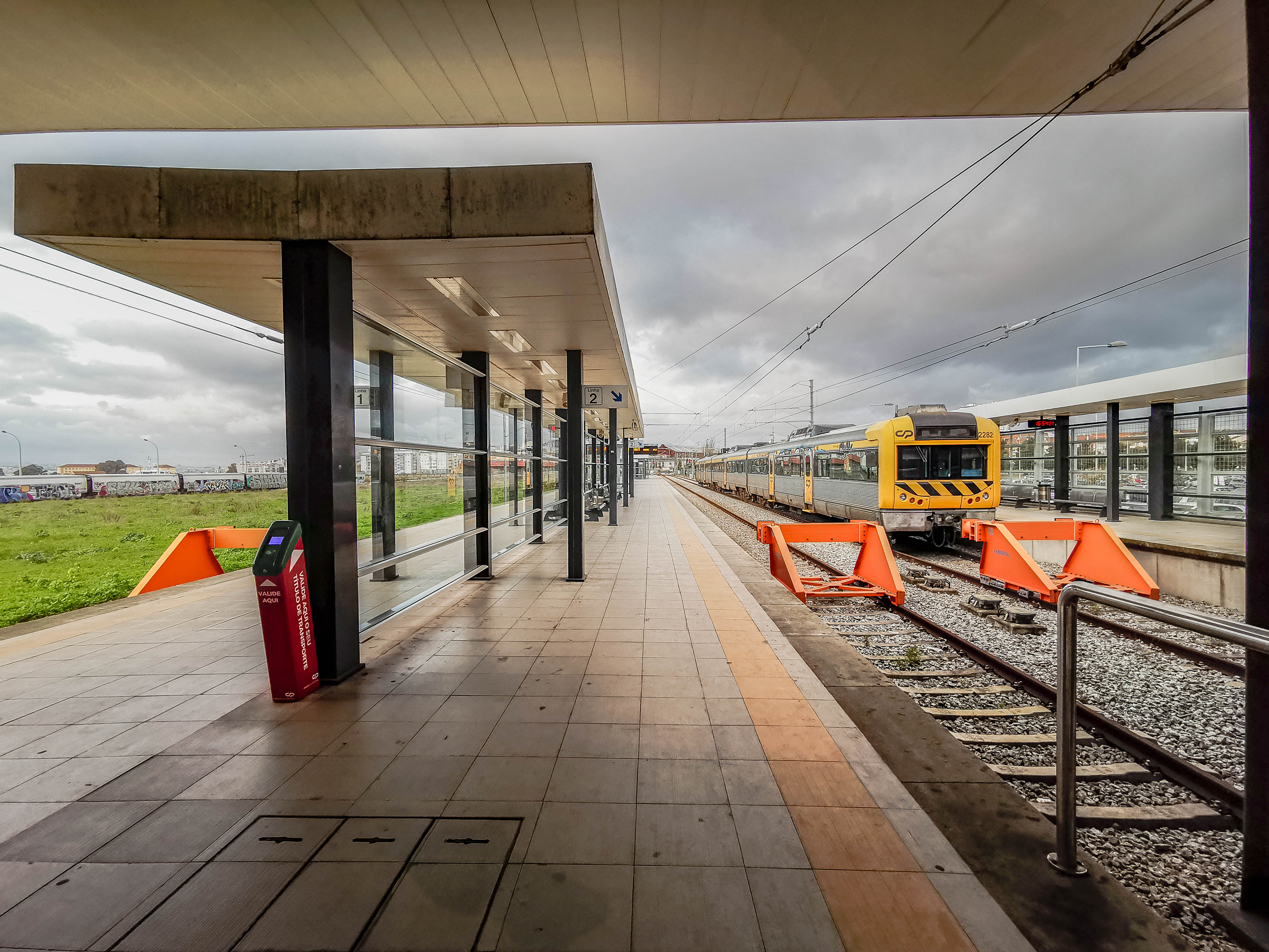
Platforms at the (third) Barreiro station.

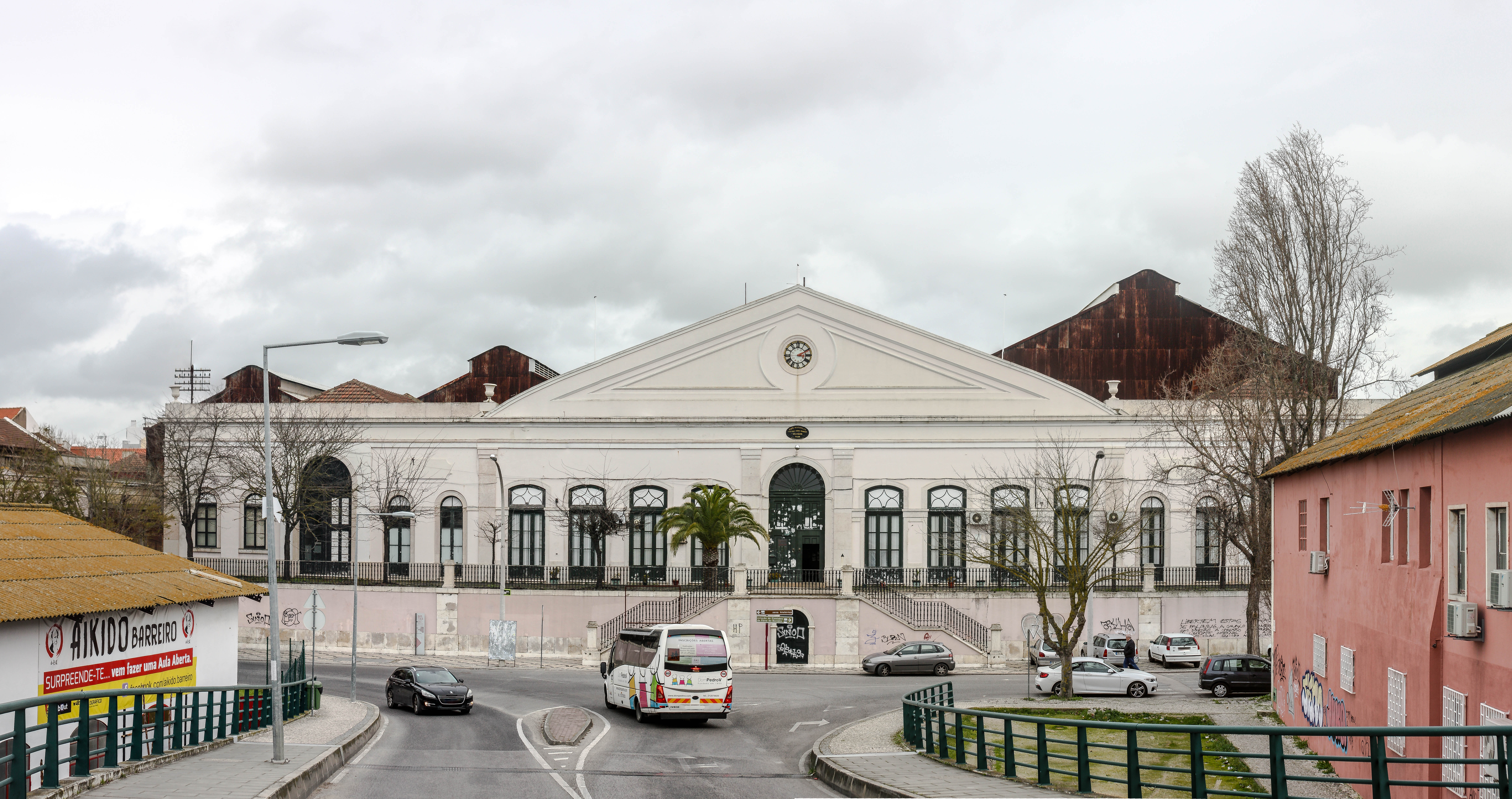
Façade of the first station in 2020.

The first station (1861-1884) was housed in a large building, with a frontage of approximately 65m wide, 16 spans for windows and doors, and three gates. The station was relocated in 1884 to the future South and Southeast terminal after complaints from several passengers who needed to cross two kilometers of sandy beach to gain access to the river terminal. The building was maintained and later integrated into the Empresa de Manutenção de Equipamento Ferroviário, S.A. (EMEF) Barreiro workshop complex.

=== Second station ===
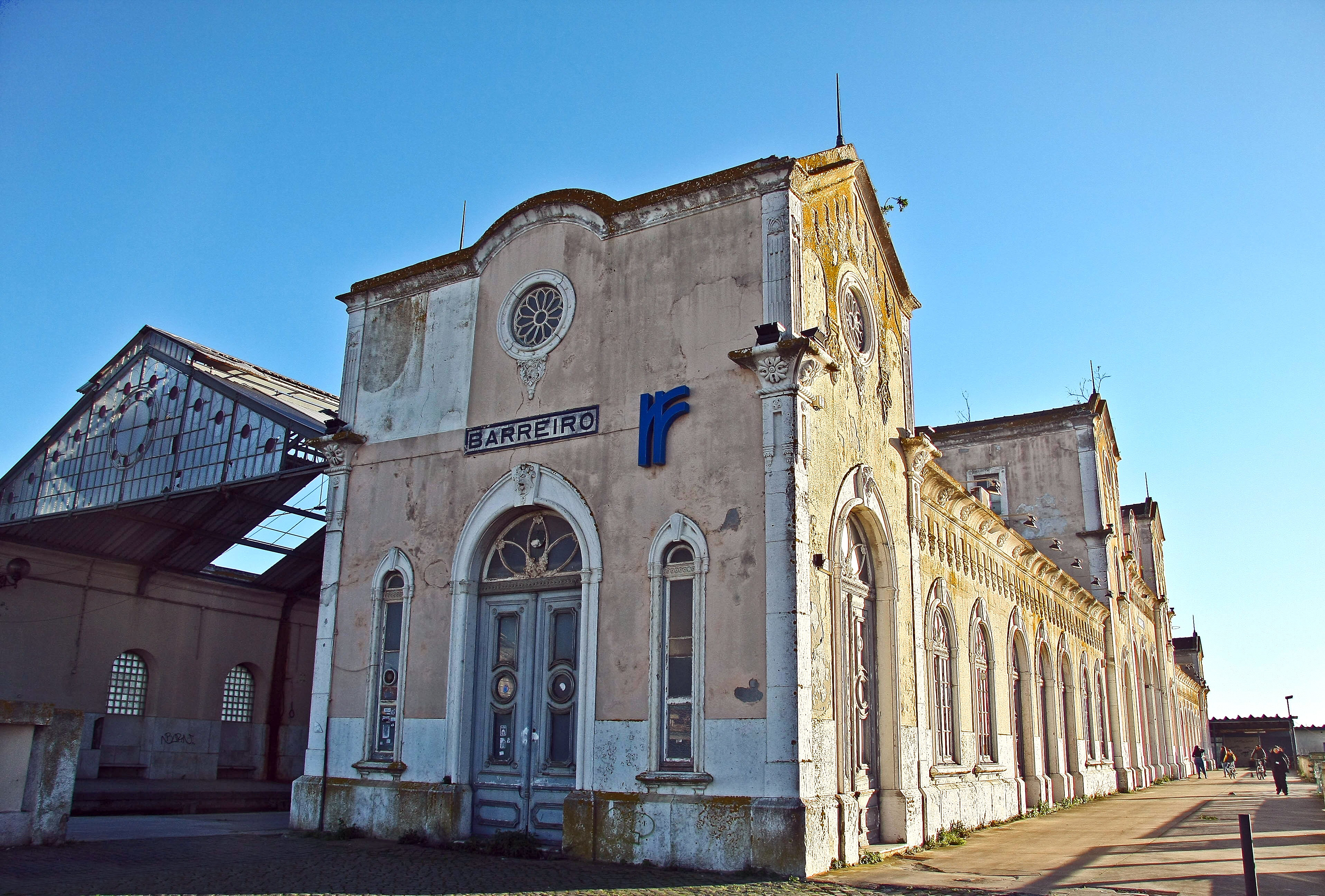
The second station, as early as 2020.

Designed by the engineer Miguel Pais, the second station (1884-2008) combines the Romantic aesthetic, evident in the maritime and faunal decoration of the west façade, with the Neo-Manueline and industrial styles, evident in the materials and in the functional way in which the south façade is structured.

In 2004, it had a public support service for the National Railway Network, and four manoeuver tracks. The station was equipped with a distribution center, to sort mail transported by rail, having its own stamp. This Barreiro station served as a connection between trains from the region south of the Tagus River, and as a fluvial port for passengers and goods, with connections to Lisbon. It was taken out of service with the construction of the new structure in 2008, and the building was left in disrepair. It was declared in 2018 as having a "under classification" status (Diário da República 2nd Series, No. 30 of February 12) in the listing process of the Barreiro Railway Complex.

=== Third station ===
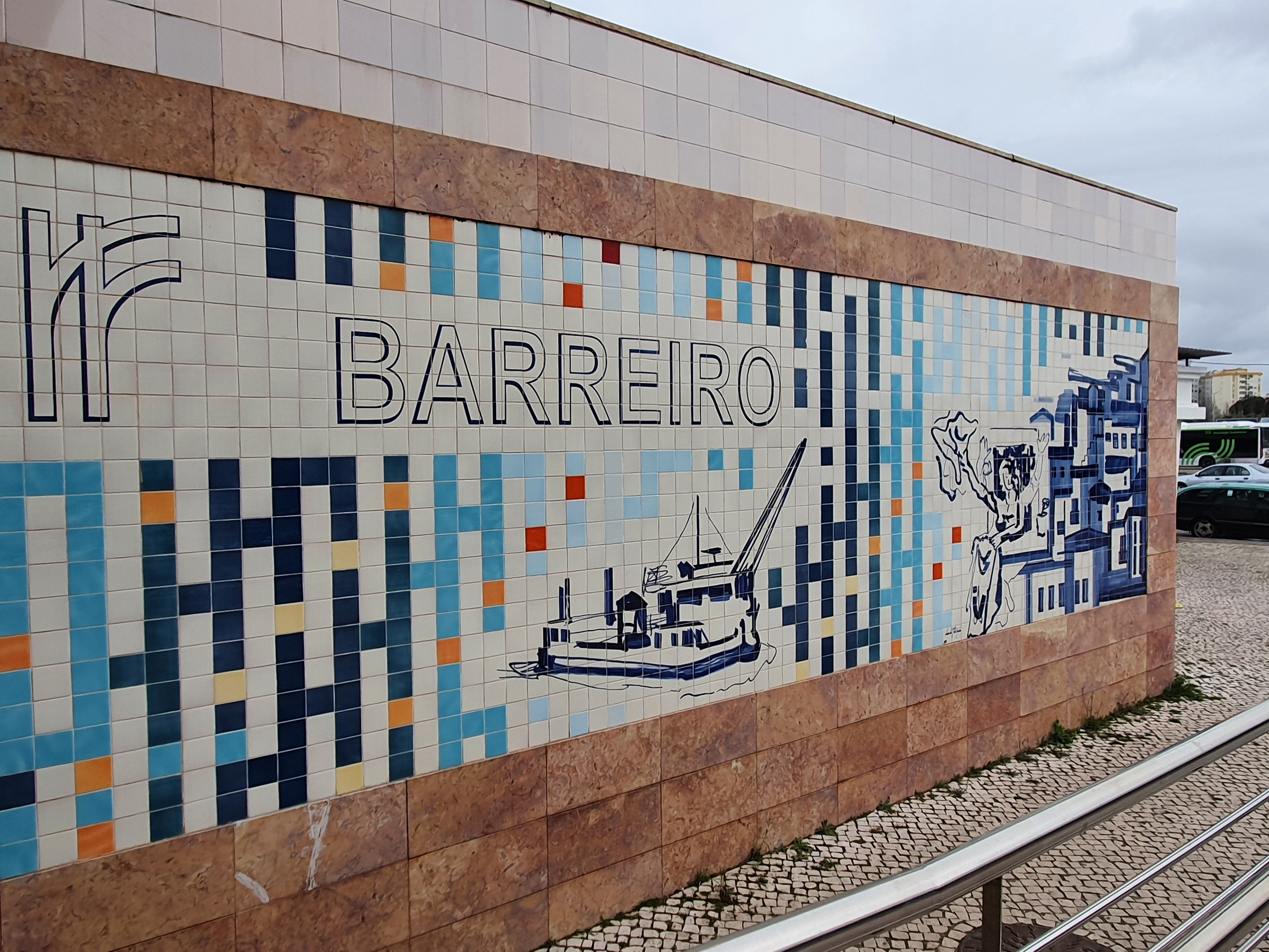
Mural tiles at the current station.

Inaugurated in 2008, it is adjacent to the previous Barreiro station, about 100m away, and consists only of platforms and their shelters, without any support buildings. The station services are housed in the adjoining river terminal.

== History ==
=== Background and planning ===
In the 1850s, planning began for a railway on the south bank of the Tagus River, which would be connected by waterway to the city of Lisbon. On July 24, 1854, the government signed a contract with the Marquis of Ficalho and José Maria Eugénio de Almeida, who set up a partnership for the construction of a railway from the south bank to Vendas Novas, starting in Montijo (a locality at the time still known as Aldeia Galega do Ribatejo). Later, the starting point was changed to Barreiro, since this location had a natural harbor for the ships at Vale do Zebro, and as an artificial harbor would have to be built at Montijo, a costly project. On August 26 of that year, an additional contract was signed between the government and the partners for the construction of a second line from the south bank of the Tagus, in Barreiro, to Setúbal.

=== Inauguration of the first station and change of gauge ===
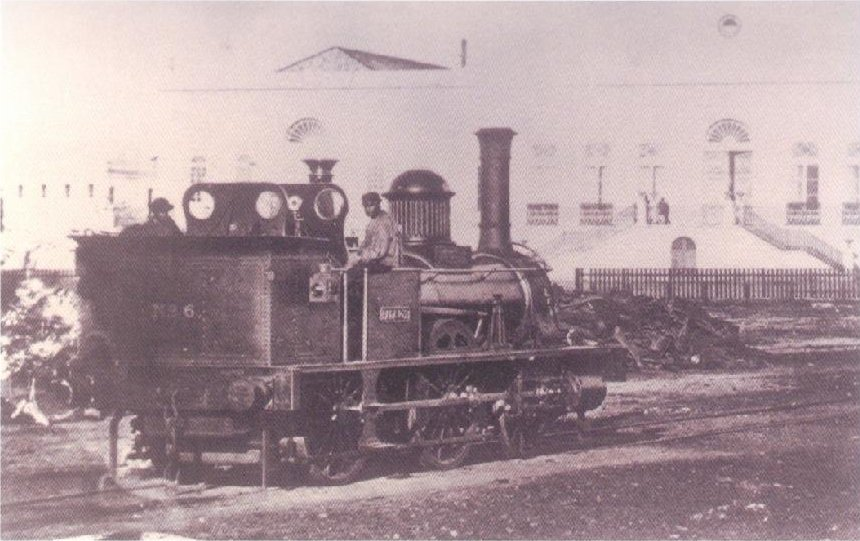
Badajoz locomotive maneuvering in Barreiro in the XIX century. The first Barreiro station can be seen in the background.

The section between the stations of Barreiro and Bombel, of the Caminho de Ferro do Sul (later called the Southern Line and then the Alentejo Line), was opened for operation on 15 June 1857, by the Companhia Nacional de Caminhos de Ferro ao Sul do Tejo. However, this line was only officially inaugurated on 1 February 1861, the year in which the connection to Vendas Novas and Setúbal was completed. Originally, the Caminho de Ferro do Sul used a 1.44m gauge. On 7 August of that year, the Companhia Nacional was nationalized, and the Caminho de Ferro do Sul and the branch to Setúbal were handed over to Companhia dos Caminhos de Ferro do Sueste on 21 April 1864. Later that year, the tracks were modified to have an Iberian-gauge.

=== Inauguration of the second station ===
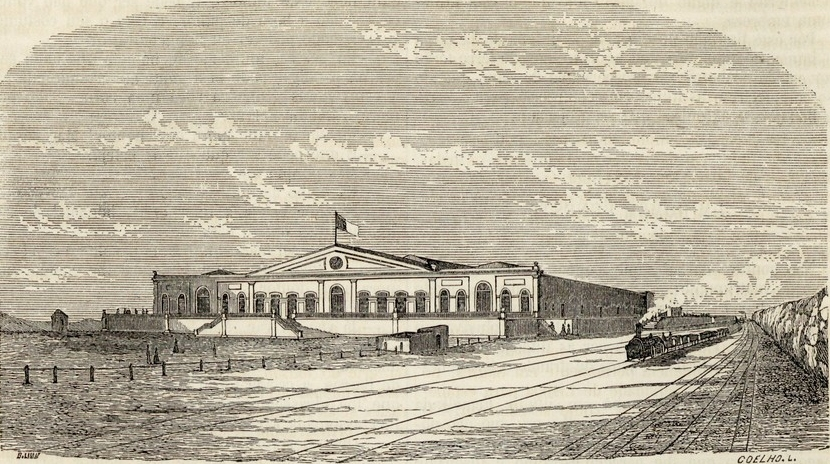
The original Barreiro station, in its early years.

Although the station was considered to have ideal conditions for train service, it was built about 2 km away from the river pier at Mexilhoeiro, hindering mobility of passengers and goods between the two points. Later that year, the company was nationalized, and the operation of its lines was handed over to the Sueste Railway Company in 1864. In turn, the Sueste Company was nationalized in 1869.

To solve such problem, on October 4, 1884, a new railway station was built, named the South and Southeast Railway Station ("Estação do Caminho de Ferro Sul e Sueste"), which had wharves for boats, facilitating the transshipment process. The line between both stations was inaugurated on December 20 of the same year. The former structure came into use as a traction workshop, and the Grupo Oficinal do Barreiro was later based there, which was integrated into the Empresa de Manutenção de Equipamento Ferroviário (EMEF) in 1994.

On March 1, 1889, the Gazeta dos Caminhos de Ferro reported that the first train had arrived in the Faro station from Barreiro. The inauguration of the railroad to Faro took place on July 1 of that year.

In October 1897, the monarchs Carlos I and Amélie visited Algarve, having traveled by train between Barreiro and Faro.

=== Transition to the 20th century ===
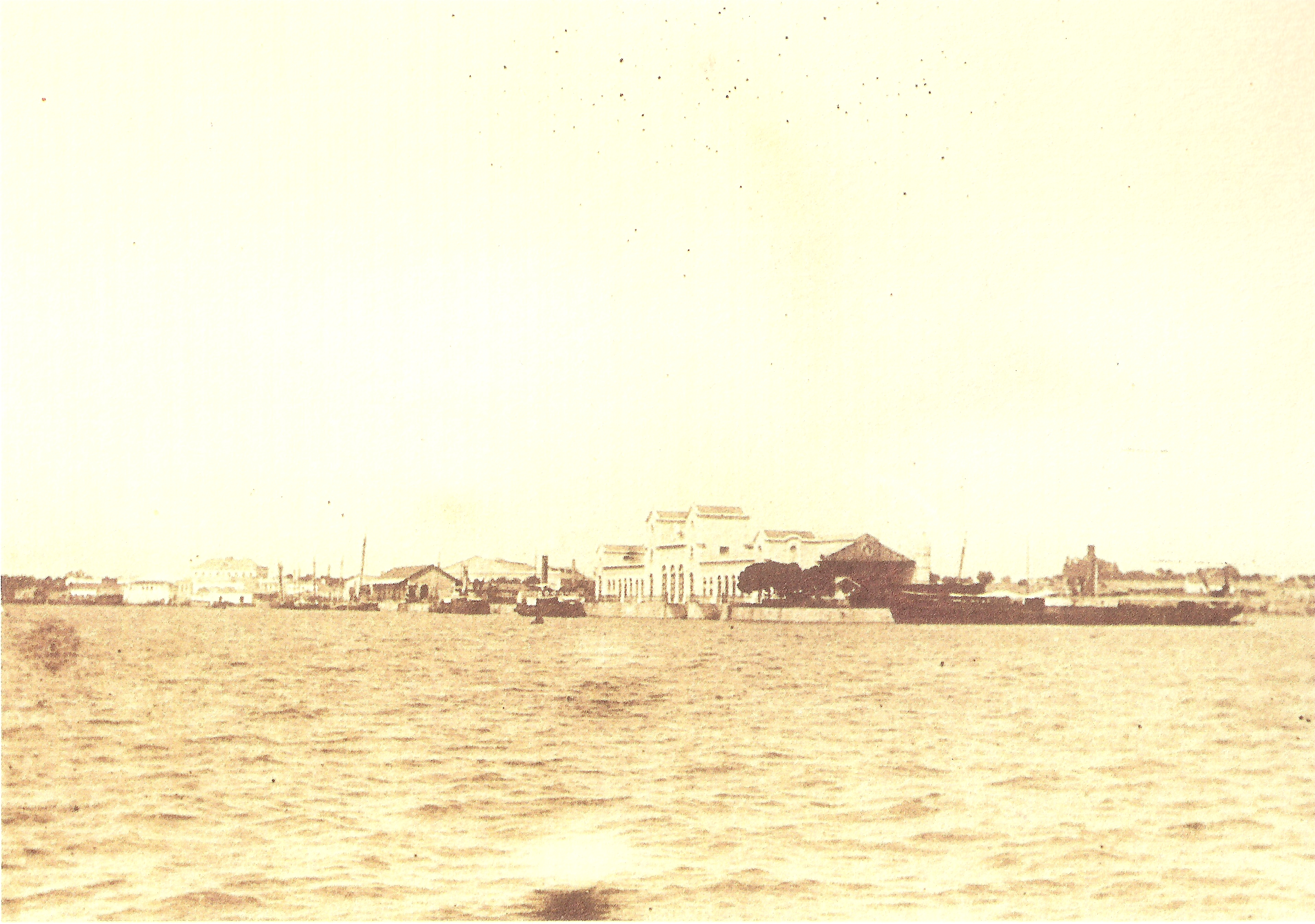
Barreiro station, late 19th century.

At the end of the 19th century, the station and its warehouses underwent expansion works, due to fears that the Cacilhas branch line, which was being planned at the time, would lead to a reduction in rail traffic. Still, at the beginning of the 20th century, the Barreiro station had several structural problems, such as the river docks having no protection and suffering frequent flooding on rainy days. This meant goods had to be loaded and unloaded on a small pier, with only two steam cranes, and stored in a warehouse that was very small. In addition, this infrastructure also served for the unloading of coal, rails, and other materials, to the general warehouses. To make the most of the available space on the ships, refills and small-speed goods were transshipped in the same place, generating several misplacements and other irregularities in the service. The river wharves and railway lines lacked proper identification, which further complicated operations. These deficiencies made the management of the terminal more expensive, which was reflected in the prices charged to customers. Due to the limited space available on the site, only small expansions, such as the installation of new cranes, could be made, which failed to solve the station's problems. On the other hand, navigation near the station was difficult, as the water being shallow in certain places.

=== 20th century ===
==== 1900s and 1910s ====
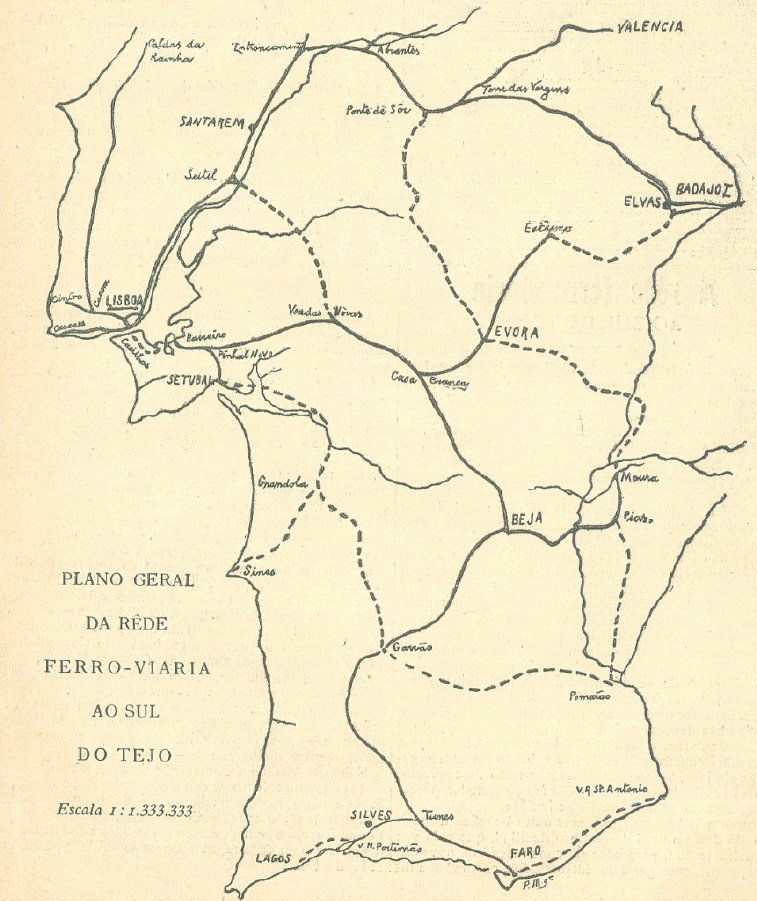
Plan for the network south of the Tagus, including the project from Barreiro to Cacilhas.

An ordinance of 1 July 1901 authorized the board of directors of the Caminhos de Ferro do Estado to build the first section of a line between Barreiro and Cacilhas, especifically from Barreiro to the right bank of the Ribeira de Coina. This project, dated 31 December 1902, was approved on 11 July 1903. In 1901, Companhia União Fabril built a chemical complex in Barreiro, which was connected to the station by a branch line called "Ramal Particular das Lezírias".

On July 1, 1902, the Gazeta dos Caminhos de Ferro reported that the Southern and Southeastern railroad had already acquired six Kitson oil-powered lighting fixtures, which were to be first tried out at the Barreiro station, and then installed at the Beja station. At that time, the introduction of a power supply system was being studied, which was to be used at the Barreiro station, and to power the machinery and apparatus in the workshops. On December 1 of that year, the Gazeta dos Caminhos de Ferro reported that the Siemens & Halske company was to be contracted to install the electricity supply.

A Ministry of Public Works, Commerce and Industry decree of 19 September 1903 ordered the expropriation of a plot of land for the construction of a path between Miguel Pais and Carlos Albers streets, as part of the work to expand the Barreiro station. On 1 April 1903, the Gazeta dos Caminhos de Ferro reported that the materials and mechanisms for installing small portable compressed-air machine tools had arrived and assembly was about to begin. It was predicted that with the introduction of this new equipment, repair work on the rolling stock would become faster and less expensive, especially on locomotives. At the same time, it was believed that work would soon begin on electric power, and that electric machine tools would arrive and be assembled in a new carpentry and joinery workshop.

On January 1, 1905, the same publication reported that a firewood house had been installed at the station for use by staff (traction and workshop staff in particular), and on November 1 it reported that washrooms for staff had been built.

On February 1, 1908, the royal family passed through the Barreiro station during their trip from the Alentejo to Lisbon and suffered an attack shortly after leaving the Terreiro do Paço Fluvial Terminal. On June 16, 1909, an order had been placed to complete an embankment that was destined for workshops and to pave the slopes for créosotage. (Note: Applying creosote to wood to protect it from parasites and ensure its preservation.)

On April 1, 1910, forty wagons were to be built in Barreiro's workshops, destined for the Sul and Sueste network. In January 1912, there was a strike of railroad porters at the station.

In December 1918, engineers Ernesto de Oliveira Rocha, head of the Material and Traction Service, and Artur de Campos Ventura, sub-chief of the same department, drew up a project for the remodeling and expansion of the general workshops at Barreiro since these facilities were already becoming insufficient for the repair and renovation of the rolling stock in the southern region. It was estimated that the budget for the works would be less than 500,000$00. However, the Caminhos de Ferro do Estado did not approve this project, nor did it order the preparation of a new one that could improve the operation of the workshops. This meant that the complex had a large number of rolling stock that could not be moved and was therefore scattered around the place.

=== 1920s ===
==== 1920 to 1925 ====
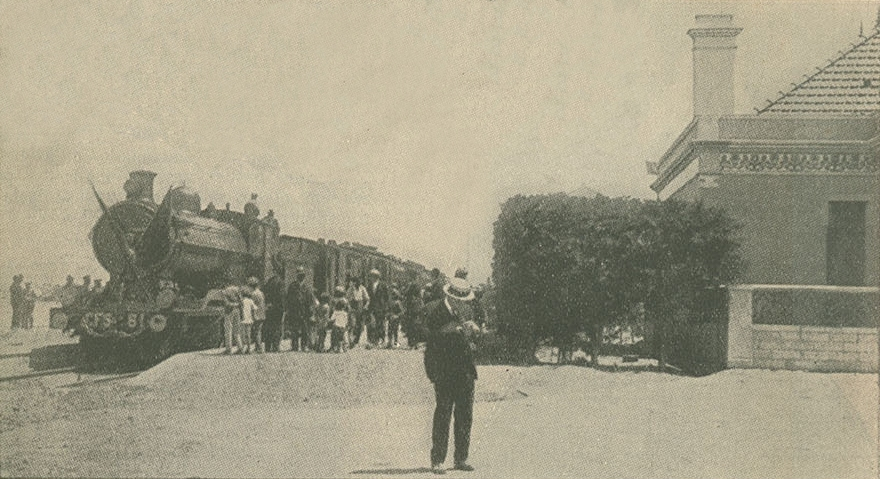
Inauguration of the Seixal Branch Line on July 29, 1923.

In 1920, there was a large increase in the number of rolling stock at Barreiro due to strikes, so the new head of the Material and Traction Service, Oliveira Cabral, drew up a new project to expand the workshops. Since by then there was a shortage of rolling stock to meet demand on the southern and southeastern lines, the board used this preliminary project as the basis for a public tender in March 1921. However, no bidders applied, leading the board to hire the Armstrong Whitworth company to execute this project, which began studies right away. Order of July 21 of that year authorized the State Railroad Board to contract the company William Beardmore and Co. for the supply of materials for the construction of the general workshops at Barreiro.

However, the agreement with Armstrong was still being negotiated when the violent uprising of 19 October 1921 in Lisbon occurred, and the board of directors was replaced by an administrative commission that canceled the negotiations and ordered a new tender. About a year later, on 27 September 1922, information from the administrative commission was approved by the council of ministers, which proposed that the works for the new Barreiro workshops be awarded to the company William Beardmore for £203,867. This award was the subject of several complaints, but the contract was signed on 3 March 1923, for the supply of all the materials necessary for the extension of the workshops, except for the masonry. At the end of that year, work began, and in January 1924 the purchase of the machine tools from various companies was authorized, for £61,340.

In March 1924, when the board of directors of the Caminhos de Ferro had already been resumed, they ordered the works to be halted, since it had been informed that to build the new workshops on that site it would be necessary to close the old facilities for about two years. Alleging that an atmosphere of social disorder existed in Barreiro, it was determined on March 8 that the new workshops should instead be installed in Pinhal Novo. However, this measure did not please the political and economic authorities of Barreiro, who complained to the government. Furthermore, it proved that the board of directors had exceeded their powers since the order to build the new workshops had been given by the council of ministers, leading the Minister of Public Works to cancel the decision to move the works to Pinhal Novo and order that a commission be created to study the matter. This commission, formed by the engineers Costa Serrão, Carlos Albers, Duro Sequeira, and Perpétuo da Cruz, concluded that the Beardmore company project was so large that it could only be realized if the old workshops were shut down, and that the available space was not sufficient for the new facilities. Still, he agreed that they should be built in Barreiro since it was close to the river facilities, and because it was easier to recruit new workers as there was already housing and urban infrastructure such as parks and schools. The minister agreed with this report and ordered the management of South and Southeast to draw up two projects, one according to the commission's conclusions, and another where the new workshops would be installed on the embankment between Barreiro and Lavradio. A second commission was formed, consisting of the engineers Carlos Albers, Duro Sequeira, Zacarias Santana, Rodrigo Monteiro, and Eugénio Amaral, to give their opinion on the two hypotheses. However, no agreement was reached, since two of the members preferred the embankment while the others continued to defend the conclusions of the first commission. The matter was thus submitted to the Higher Council of Public Works and in January 1925 the minister issued an order, stating that the workshops be built entirely on the embankment. Following this, the South and Southeast Directorate began the earthworks on the chosen site, which cost 1,500,000 contos.

Meanwhile, on July 29, 1923, the Seixal Branch Line went into service, connecting Seixal to Barreiro.

==== 1925 to 1930 ====
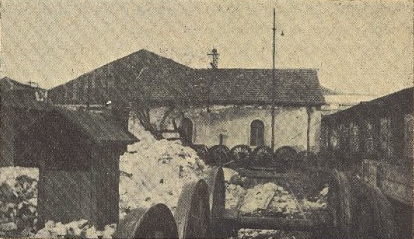
Former mold workshop and wheel park.

In March 1925, construction began on the Barreiro mechanical coal plant, which was completed in October 1926. This structure cost several hundred contos and had a capacity for 250 tons of coal, but never came into regular use.

During a meeting of the board of directors of the Caminhos de Ferro do Estado on October 27, 1926, a request from the management of the Caminhos de Ferro do Sul e Sueste to replace the rockfill at the station with a wall, budgeted at 194,400 contos, was discussed.

During the Revolt of February 1927, the Barreiro railwaymen joined the coup, interrupting the circulation of trains. Also in 1927, the Caminhos de Ferro do Estado were leased to the Companhia dos Caminhos de Ferro Portugueses, which began operating the old Minho and Douro and South and Southeast networks on 11 May of that year. Following this process, a third commission was created in December, formed by engineers Duro Sequeira, Júlio José dos Santos and Mário Costa, representing the state, and Ferreira de Mesquita and Jorge Malheiro. This commission also failed to reach an agreement since the state representatives wanted the workshops to be built in Barreiro, while the company representatives argued that a single workshop core should be built for all lines, to reduce costs, although they did not put forward hypotheses where these central workshops could be built. The main bet for the location of the central workshops was, at that time, in Contumil Station, although this would lead to the largest locomotives having to be dismounted to cross the Maria Pia Bridge, due to the significant weight limitations of that structure. In addition, the company representatives claimed that Barreiro was not the ideal location for construction, due to the poor water quality, the proximity of the Companhia União Fabril facilities, and the future need to expand the station, although it was anticipated that the current station could operate for at least another twenty years. Later, a fifth commission was formed, consisting of the engineers Carlos Pinto Machado, Júlio José dos Santos and Ferreira de Mesquita, which also divided its opinion between installing the workshops on the embankment or building a central workshop core, as the representatives of the Companhia dos Caminhos de Ferro Portugueses had previously suggested.

The Gazeta dos Caminhos de Ferro stated that it would be impossible to build the new complex on the embankment due to the large number of chemical gases expelled by the Companhia União Fabril's factories, which would be toxic to workers and corrosive to metals, including tools and structures. Instead, they advocated building the new workshops on the site of the old ones, since advantage could be taken of the existing buildings, such as offices and cafeterias, large machine tools such as the air compressor or the acetylene producer, and the electricity, water, sewage and compressed air facilities. The relocation of the workshop center would require the construction of new workshops for the locomotive depot, and the creation of new complexes for the departments of the Via Fluvial and the Central Eléctrica, since the existing workshops, in addition to maintaining the rolling stock, also did the repairs for the Via Fluvial and helped in the conservation of the locomotives in the depot. In the case of the Via Fluvial, it would be less expensive to build a new ship repair center than to be constantly transporting the materials from the embankment, and this operation would complicate matters. Another issue was the transportation of construction materials and machinery already existing in the old workshops to the embankment, which would have to be done by zorras (sleds) or wagons, a very expensive process. The stability of the soil on the embankment was also in question, due to the presence of water in the soil, which would require extensive and expensive stabilization work. On the other hand, the change of location would force the displacement of about 700 families, which would cause major problems for the local economy of Barreiro. In addition, workers living in Lisbon and Barreiro would have to walk over the railroad tracks to reach the embankment, which was about km away from the Barreiro station, or else a work train would have to be created for this purpose.

The only advantage to building the new general workshops on the Lavradio embankment was its large size, which would allow for future expansion of the complex if necessary. The area near Barreiro was already almost filled in, leaving little space available to expand the existing workshops, but it could be increased by expropriating neighboring land, such as the fields in front of the Coimbra Palace, which then belonged to the state, or by demolishing several small workshops, which could easily be relocated. It was believed that no expansion works would be needed soon since the new workshops had already been planned to repair twenty locomotives simultaneously, and a larger capacity would not be necessary due to the crisis the railroads were going through at the time.

On July 20, 1928, a new revolutionary movement took place, during which an infantry company from the Setúbal barracks joined the Barreiro railroad workers, causing a new interruption in the movement of trains.

On March 1, 1929, the Gazeta dos Caminhos de Ferro reported that the Companhia dos Caminhos de Ferro Portugueses was planning to duplicate the railway track between Barreiro and Setúbal.

==== 1930s ====
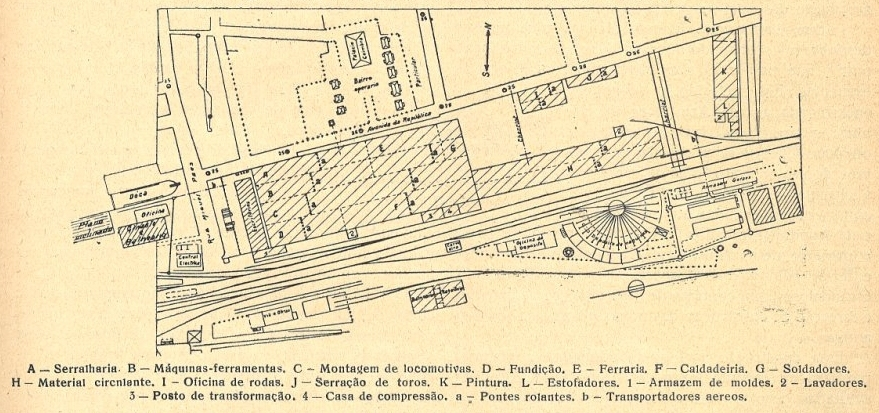
Plan of the new Barreiro workshops.

===== 1930 to 1935 =====
In the 1930s, the architect Cottinelli Telmo designed a food warehouse in Barreiro, which was built and expanded in the following decade to serve as a prototype for the design of other buildings of the same type in the country.

In 1931, the Companhia dos Caminhos de Ferro Portugueses acquired the ship Évora, to run river services between Lisbon and Barreiro. She was considered one of the best ships of this type at the time, improving the quality of service considerably. She was active until late 1975.

In the 1931-1932 Report of the General Directorate of Railways, the expenditure of 1,500 contos on works at the Barreiro station was recorded. In 1932, the Companhia dos Caminhos de Ferro Portugueses built a concrete water reservoir with a capacity of 300m³, completed the reconstruction of the south wall of Barreiro, and continued work on the north wall. In June 1933, construction of the new general workshops began. Also in 1933, the company rebuilt part of the north wall and built an inclined plane. On August 25, 1933, a contract was signed with Sociedade de Construções Metálicas for the construction of the buildings for the new workshops, for $2,396,000.

In 1934, the company installed two double telephone lines between Barreiro and Pinhal Novo and built the inclined plane of Barreiro's north wall. Also in 1934, road access was improved due to the construction of Avenida dos Sapadores.

During the general strike of 18 January 1934, the strikers in Silves arranged with their colleagues in Barreiro, for them to block the trains, as a sign that the strike had begun. Thus, the train that was supposed to go from Barreiro to the Algarve was temporarily prevented from leaving, and when it did not show up at the regular time in Silves, the strike in this Algarve town began. However, the railwaymen retracted and let the train pass, which arrived in Silves when the strikers were already preparing to assault the National Republican Guard barracks. On 21 June of that year, a special train was held for the inauguration of the section to Santiago do Cacém of the Sines Line, which started and ended in Barreiro.

==== 1935 to 1940 ====
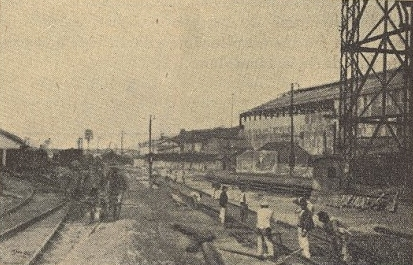
Extension of the tracks between Barreiro and Lavradio, 1935.

For the construction of the avenue and the new workshops, the railway complex area was profoundly modified, with several warehouse and office buildings having been demolished, and new platforms for unloading passengers and goods being built. This project involved the creation of several embankments and excavations, raising the wall, as well as the construction of a lacy reinforced concrete balustrade. The railway track layout was also modified, according to the study for the new double line between Barreiro and Pinhal Novo. With this, the track began to run along the rear of the machine depot, leading to the demolition of Barreiro-A, which was to be replaced by the Barreiro-Terra Station. Work on the new line began on February 7, 1935, and the new track went into service on July 21, 1935. The Gazeta dos Caminhos de Ferro of August 16 reported that the laying of track inside the Barreiro station had already been completed, using masonry dice embedded in concrete, a system already used at Rossio station. It also reported that there were plans to install electric lighting in the station, work that would be directed by engineer Bolina, of the Traction Electric Services. The laying of the new tracks was done without interrupting train circulation.

On April 9, 1935, the Direcção Geral de Caminhos de Ferro ordered the chief engineer of the construction division, Rodrigo Severiano do Vale Monteiro, to sign on behalf of the Minister of Public Works a contract with Sociedade de Construções Metálicas for the construction of a transformer station and a compressor room, the demolition of a small building housing the machinists' school, the staff private box and a medical post, the modification of the interior of the central offices building, and the construction of a washbasin and a porch between the east façades of the central offices building and the west of the new general workshops. On July 16, the Gazeta dos Caminhos de Ferro reported that the Caminhos de Ferro avenue was under construction, beginning in front of the General Offices building and ending near the Barreiro-Mar station, an improvement that had been requested for many years. The new avenue had a 6.5m carriageway, built with granite cubes from Monte Redondo, flanked by sidewalks. It had a length of 420m, about half of which was seaside.

The station's building also underwent major modifications: new spans were opened, while the eastern side was lined with white tiles; the installation of two panels alluding to the Alentejo and Algarve regions was planned. All works at the Barreiro complex were paid for by the Special Railway Fund and managed by the Companhia dos Caminhos de Ferro Portugueses and employed several hundred workers. The construction works were directed by engineer Borges de Almeida, supported by foremen António de Miranda, Gonçalo Joaquim Rodrigues, and António Sousa Ferreira, and supervised by engineer Constantino de Carvalho, sub-chief of the division of Track and Works. The completion of the works was planned for June 30 of that year but was delayed due to problems in the supply of materials, so they were not expected to be completed until late July at that time. Also in 1935, another inclined plane was built at the station.

A decree dated 3 June 1936, issued by the General Directorate of Railways, approved the notice for a contract for the construction and assembly of the new buildings necessary for the completion of the general workshops, which had been awarded to Sociedade de Construções Metálicas. The workshop complex included a machine depot, for maintenance of the rolling stock, which was equipped with a traffic circle.

On 16 October 1936, the Gazeta dos Caminhos de Ferro reported that the Barreiro colliery was to be demolished. That year, the Companhia dos Caminhos de Ferro Portugueses rebuilt one of the Barreiro wharf bridges in reinforced concrete.

On 6 January 1937, the General Directorate of Railways issued various orders for contracts to purchase equipment for the Barreiro workshops:

- Namely a machine to drill threads on locomotive switch spindles and wagon tensioners, plus seven milling cutters for the same machine to company Francisco José Simões Limitada.
- To company Aços Finos Roeschling S. A.: 5 lathes with 1:200mm distance between points and with pit, 13 lathes of the same dimensions but without pict, a milling machine, and 415 milling cutters.
- To Fritz W. Meyer Limitada: 2 turning lathes for material with a diameter of 50mm, turning lathes for 40mm, a manual machine for edging sheets up to 1mm thick, 25 milling cutters, and 5 circular saws.

On the same day, decrees were also issued to approve the construction of the washroom and general workshops, whose contract had been awarded to the Sociedade de Construções Metálicas, and to award the Siemens firm a complete chrome, nickel, oxidizing, and copper-plating plant. Work on the new general workshops at Barreiro was completed in 1937.

On November 11, 1935, the National Union of Southern Portuguese Railway Workers was founded in Barreiro.

In 1938, Companhia União Fabril already had about 25 km of its tracks in the Barreiro area. The report of the General Directorate of Railways for 1938 recorded the expenditure of 3000 contos (1,000 million escudos) for improvement works at several stations, including the one in Barreiro.

A decree of the General Directorate of Railways, published in the Diário do Governo #77, Series II, of 3 April 1939, approved the definitive acceptance certificate for the second and third phases of the construction of new buildings for the general workshops.

On 26 May 1939, a trip from Lisbon to Setúbal was organized to celebrate the end of a course of the Regiment of Railway Sappers, and the route from Terreiro do Paço to Barreiro was made by boat, and then by train to Setúbal.

==== 1940s ====
In 1941, several carriages produced by the American factory Budd, that used a new construction technique called tubular design, were assembled at Barreiro. In 1943, extension and remodeling works were carried out. Between June and August 1945, several steam locomotives using diesel instead of coal arrived by ship, which were quickly assembled in the Santa Apolónia and Barreiro workshops, as they were urgently needed due to the coal shortage at that time.

In the mid-1940s, there were still problems in railway communications between the capital and the Algarve, mainly due to the slowness of the trains; fast trains took almost a whole day to reach Barreiro, while postal trains took all night to make the same journey, and after that, there was still a one-hour journey to cross the Tagus by boat. However, despite its inconveniences, traveling by train was still better than doing this route by road, as the roads were in poor condition and made travelling slower and uncomfortable.

On January 21, 1949, a special train was organized from Barreiro to Portalegre for the inauguration of the section between Cabeço de Vide and Portalegre, with the Minister of Communications and other guests traveling.

==== 1950s ====
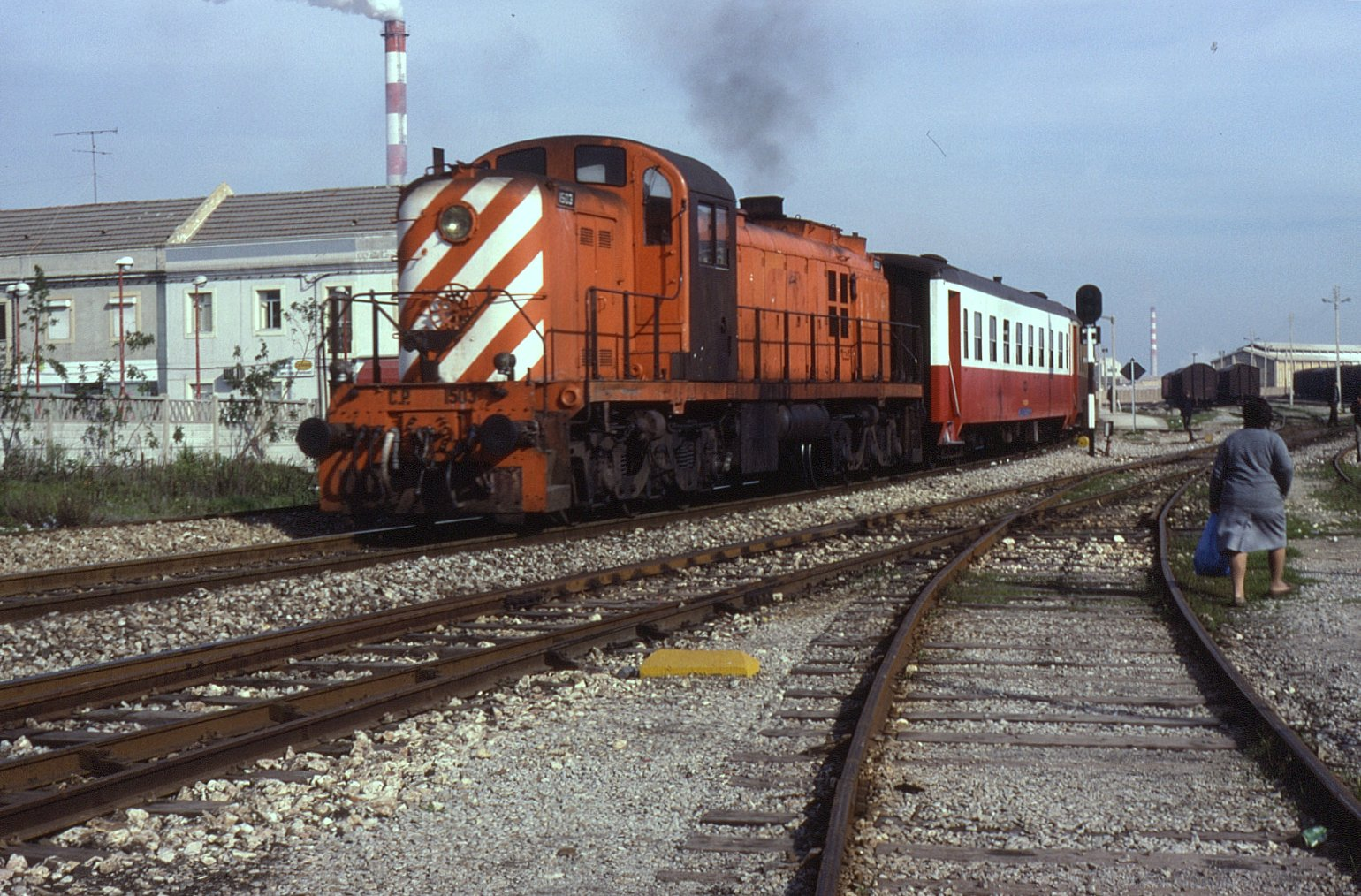
Locomotive 1503 at Barreiro, in 1990.

With the progressive electrification of the railway network in the north and center of the country, starting in the 1950s, several locomotives were relegated to the lines in the south of the country, being assigned to the Barreiro depot. Among the series that suffered this process were the 1500 and 1300, both diesel, and the 070 to 097, coal-fired.

Between 1954 and 1955, the interiors, bogies, and brakes of several carriages, whose boxes were built by the French company Carel et Fouché, were assembled in the Barreiro workshops.

On 19 March 1959, Estaleiros Navais de Viana do Castelo was contracted to build 2 boats for the river services between Lisbon and Barreiro, as part of the Second Incentive Plan.

==== 1960s and 1970s ====
In the 1960s, the new boats between Lisbon and Barreiro began service. They were equipped with radars that improved safety conditions and traffic management on that route.

On September 15, 1966, the suspension of freight transport by boat between Barreiro and Lisbon was approved, which was now done by road and rail.

On 16 August 1968, the Gazeta dos Caminhos de Ferro reported that the Companhia dos Caminhos de Ferro Portugueses was preparing a major program to remodel its railroads, including the complete renovation of the section between Barreiro and Faro, via Setúbal.

In 1969, several wooden carriages were metalized in the Barreiro workshops, creating the B600 Series.

From the late 1960s, there was a large increase in the number of women on the staff of the Companhia dos Caminhos de Ferro Portugueses, which began a program to build nursery schools at its stations, including Barreiro.

In a 1968 article in the Gazeta dos Caminhos de Ferro, it was predicted that the Seixal Branch Line would soon be closed, and its service would be replaced by a river line between Barreiro and Seixal.

In 1977, the Companhia dos Caminhos de Ferro Portugueses was nationalized, and renamed Caminhos de Ferro Portugueses. In that year, a single-class system was implemented on several suburban lines, including on the route between Barreiro and Praias - Sado.

==== 1990s ====
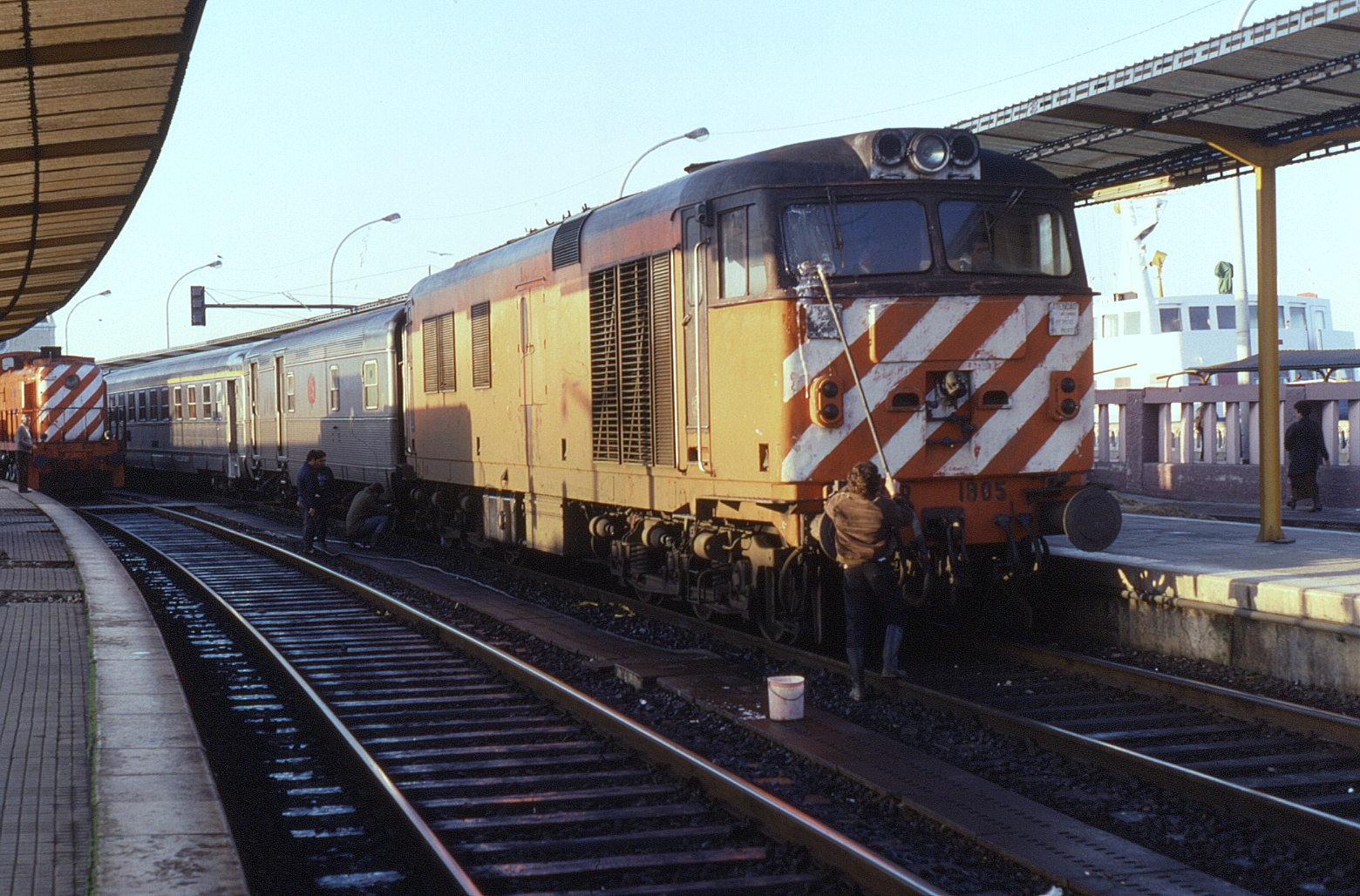
Locomotive 1805 at Barreiro station, in 1990.

In 1990, Intercity trains began running between Barreiro, Beja, and Évora and in 1995, a new road-rail terminal was built at Barreiro.

=== 21st century ===
The old Barreiro - Sul e Sueste station was taken out of service on 14 December 2008, when the new Barreiro station was inaugurated as part of the Sado Line modernization project.

This project was executed by Rede Ferroviária Nacional and also included the reconstruction of the Barreiro-A and Lavradio stations. The new station was located to the east of the old one so that it would be closer to the river terminal. With the commissioning of the new station, the old railway terminal was closed and went into abandonment, a situation that was criticized by the Barreiro City Council in 2010, as they wanted to preserve the structure. The city council communicated the decision to preserve and redevelop the old station building, highlighting the symbolic value of this infrastructure in the city's railway history. At that time, the municipality was drafting an urbanization plan that could bring changes to the station area.

== In literature ==
In the book Uma Visita a Portugal em 1866, Hans Christian Andersen relates his passage through the first station at Barreiro, during a trip from Lisbon to Setúbal:

Early in the morning, [...] we set off by carriage from Jorge O'Neill's country house to Lisbon, a half-hour's walk away, to soon board the steamboat that daily connects with the railroad on the south bank of the Tagus River. [...] Crossing the interminable wooden bridge, we arrived at the railway station for Setúbal. When there were no trains yet, it was from this point that the royal roads to Palmela Castle departed. - Hans Christian Andersen, 1866, pp. 49-50

In his 1870 Narrative of a Spring Tour in Portugal, the Reverend Alfred Charles Smith describes the difficulties in getting from the river wharf to the first station at Barreiro:

Our steamer reached the pier at Barreiro, and then we had to trudge a quarter of a mile to the railway station, which would be annoying enough to those laden with baggage or during a heavy shower. - Alfred Smith, Narrative of a Spring Tour in Portugal, pp. 61

In the fourth volume of Fialho de Almeida's Os Gatos (1891), the author describes the departure of the second station at Barreiro:

While the steamer is not arriving, I stop and lovingly embrace, from the terraces of the Barreiro station, the placid sea that unfolds before my eyes. [...] The steamer gives the signal, and the first puffs of smoke from its wheels, like a smoker's spit, the instant a frigate passes close to the pier, with a kind of sea god astern, pulling the sail... - Fialho de Almeida, Os Gatos, pp. 93-94

== See also ==
- Comboios de Portugal
- Infraestruturas de Portugal
- Rail transport in Portugal
- History of rail transport in Portugal

== Bibliography ==
- Afonso, Albérico (2010). "Setúbal". Roteiros Republicanos (in Portuguese). Setúbal: Edição e Conteúdos, S. A. e Comissão Nacional para as Comemorações do Centenário da República.
- Guita, José (2005). Uma Família Algarvia (in Portuguese). Vila Nova de Gaia: Editora Ausência. ISBN 9789895532100.
- Marques, Maria da Graça Maia (1999). O Algarve da Antiguidade aos Nossos Dias: Elementos para a sua História (in Portuguese). Lisbon: Edições Colibri. ISBN 972-772-064-1.
- Martins, João; Brion, Madalena; Sousa, Miguel (1996). O Caminho de Ferro Revisitado: O Caminho de Ferro em Portugal de 1856 a 1996. Lisboa: Caminhos de Ferro Portugueses (in Portuguese).
- Reis, Francisco; Gomes, Rosa; Gomes, Gilberto (2006). Os Caminhos de Ferro Portugueses 1856-2006 (in Portuguese). Lisbon: CP-Comboios de Portugal e Público-Comunicação Social S. A. ISBN 989-619-078-X.
- Ramos, Rui (2013). D. Carlos, 1863-1908 (in Portuguese) (8th ed.). Lisbon: Círculo de Leitores e Centro de Estudos dos Povos e Culturas de Expressão Portuguesa da Universidade Católica Portuguesa. ISBN 978-972-42-3587-5.
- Santos, Luís Filipe Sousa (1995). Os Acessos a Faro e aos Concelhos Limítrofes na Segunda Metade do Séc. XIX (in Portuguese). Faro: Câmara Municipal de Faro.
- Saraiva, José Hermano; Guerra, Maria (1998). Diário da História de Portugal (in Portuguese). Vol. 3. Lisbon: Difusão Cultural. ISBN 972-709-060-5.
