= 1300 class =

1300 class or Class 1300 may refer to:

- CP Class 1300, diesel-electric locomotives
- NS Class 1300, electric locomotives
- Queensland Railways 1300 class, diesel-electric locomotives
