= Cottinelli Telmo =

Portuguese architect (1897–1948)

José Ângelo Cottinelli Telmo
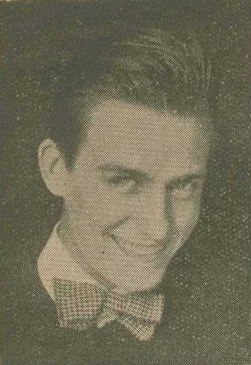
- Telmo in 1918
- Born: 13 November 1897; Alcântara, Lisbon, Portugal
- Died: 18 September 1948 (aged 50); Cascais, Portugal
- Education: Lisbon School of Fine Arts
- Occupation: Architect
- Years active: 1921–1948
- Spouse: Maria Luísa Marques Leitão de Barros
- Awards: Grand Cross of the Military Order of Christ
- Buildings: Monument of the Discoveries; South and Southeast railway station, Lisbon
- Projects: Portuguese World Exhibition; University of Coimbra;

José Ângelo Cottinelli Telmo (1897–1948) was a Portuguese architect, filmmaker, poet, artist, and musician. He believed that architecture was not based on a single discipline, but on the unification of various artistic disciplines. He was initially an adherent of modernism in architecture but later followed the neoclassical style favoured by the authoritarian government. A supporter of the Estado Novo regime, he had the trust of the Minister of Works, Duarte Pacheco, and was made responsible for several major projects, notably the overall design and most visible building for the Portuguese World Exhibition (Lisbon, 1940), and the planning for the expansion of the University of Coimbra in 1943. He also designed the construction project for the Estado Novo regime’s Tarrafal concentration camp on the island of Santiago in Cape Verde.

== Early life ==
Telmo was born in Alcântara in the Portuguese capital of Lisbon on 13 November 1897. He was the son of Cristiano da Luz Telmo, a cantor at Lisbon Cathedral and Cecília Cottinelli Telmo, a music and piano teacher. His father died in 1912. He attended the Pedro Nunes High School from 1907 to 1912 and then studied at the Lisbon School of Fine Arts (ESBA), where he graduated in architecture in 1920. From an early age he dedicated himself to a variety of artistic fields. He drew magazine covers and illustrations, created his first comic strips, wrote music, and in 1918 conducted the ESBA orchestra at the Teatro Nacional de São Carlos opera house in Lisbon. His first architectural projects were completed in 1922 and 1923.

== Career ==
The South and Southeast railway station

Along with Carlos João Chambers Ramos, Luís Cristino da Silva, Jorge Segurado, Porfírio Pardal Monteiro, and Cassiano Branco, Telmo initially pioneered modernism in architecture in Portugal but later followed the neoclassical style favoured by the government. In April 1923 he was employed as an architect by the Portuguese Railway Company (Companhia dos Caminhos de Ferro Portugueses), for which he would carry out numerous projects, most notably the monumental atrium created during the remodelling of Rossio railway station in Lisbon and the South and Southeast railway station, located in Terreiro do Paço, built between 1929 and 1931, which connected passengers from Lisbon by boat to the Barreiro railway station south of the river Tagus, before railway lines were added to the 25 de Abril Bridge in 1999.

Between 1921 and 1929, he edited the children's magazine ABC-zinho, being responsible for much of its content. In addition to designing covers, text, and illustrations, he was one of the pioneers of comics in Portugal, either producing them on his own or in association with artists such as Carlos Botelho. On 16 June 1923, Telmo married Maria Luísa Marques Leitão de Barros in Lisbon. She was the sister of the film director and playwright, José Leitão de Barros. They had two daughters, one of whom would marry the architect António Pardal Monteiro, nephew of Porfírio Pardal Monteiro.

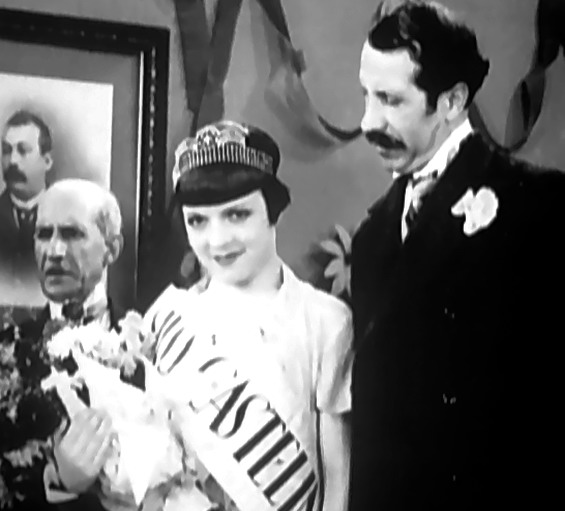
Still from A Canção de Lisboa

In 1930, Telmo participated in the First Independents' Salon at the National Society of Fine Arts. Three years later, he directed A Canção de Lisboa, the first entirely Portuguese sound film and a landmark in Portuguese filmography at the time, with a cast that included Vasco Santana, Beatriz Costa, and António Silva. In 1934, he was appointed by Pacheco to the Commission for Prison Construction, designing new buildings and remodelling projects throughout the country as well as in Portugal's colonies, such as the Tarrafal concentration camp.

In 1936, Telmo joined the paramilitary Portuguese Legion and composed the music for the anthem of the Portuguese Youth, an organization that was compulsory for everyone between 7 and 14. He edited the magazine Arquitetos from 1938 until 1942; wrote an art criticism column in the newspaper Ação (1941–42), contributed to the Mocidade Portuguesa Feminina (Portuguese Women's Youth) monthly bulletin between 1939 and 1947, and also contributed to the magazine Ilustração Portugueza.

In 1938, Telmo was appointed chief architect of the 1940 Portuguese World Exhibition, a major propaganda event for the Estado Novo, designed to mark 800 years since the foundation of Portugal and 300 years since the restoration of independence from Spain. The event involved twelve architects, nineteen sculptors, and 43 painters. In addition to the general coordination of the exhibition, Telmo took on the design of one of the two most visible pavilions: the Pavilion of the Portuguese in the World. In partnership with Leopoldo de Almeida, he designed the Monument of the Discoveries to celebrate Portugal's seafaring past. In 1943, he was tasked with planning the expansion of the University of Coimbra. To do this he adhered to the regime's monumentalist taste, which was then guided by a neoclassical style with fascist and national socialist influences. This was particularly evident in the grand staircase leading to the main entrance, but also in the architectural principles that governed the design of various buildings.

In 1941, he was elected secretary of the Council of the National Union of Architects and three years later took office as president. In the elections for the Union's governing bodies in March 1948, he was defeated by a group headed by Francisco Keil do Amaral but Amaral was prevented from taking office for political reasons. Later that year, Telmo was one of the main drivers of the First National Congress of Architecture, which led to the emergence of a new, socially committed generation that would challenge the leadership of Telmo's own generation.

== Awards and recognition ==
In 1941, Telmo was awarded the Grand Cross of the Military Order of Christ. An exhibition of his work, called Os Arquitectos são Poetas também (Architects are also poets) was held at the Monument of Discoveries in 2014. In 2024 he was posthumously made an honorary member of the Order of Architects. A street is named after him in Parede in the Cascais municipality and one in the Sintra municipality.

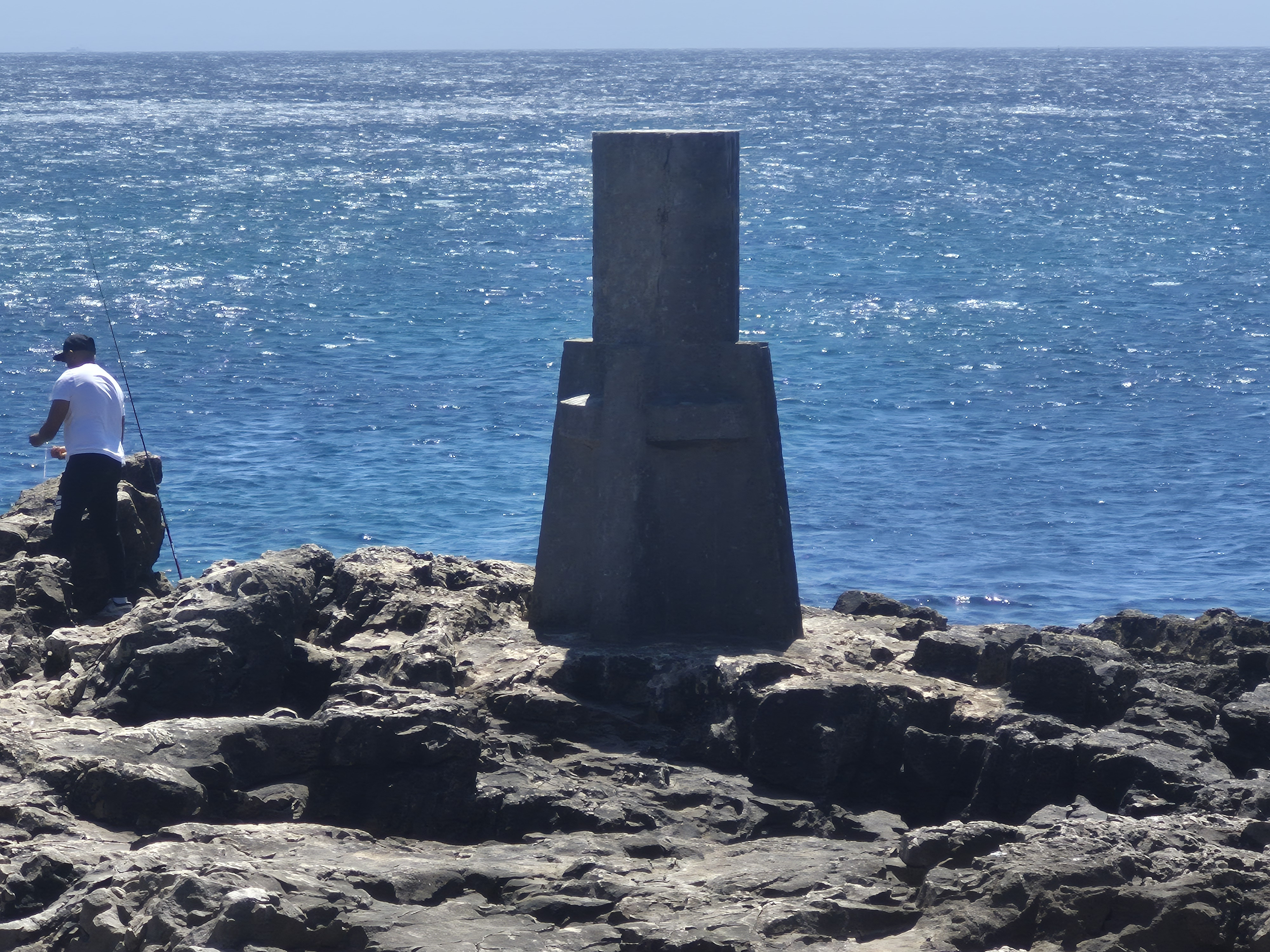
Memorial to Cottinelli Telmo at the spot in Cascais where he met his death while fishing.

== Death ==
Telmo died on 18 September 1948, in a sport fishing accident near Cascais. The spot where he died is marked by a simple stone memorial.

== Major works ==
Telmo's architectural work included:

- 1921–22. Portuguese Pavilion of Honour, International Exhibition, Rio de Janeiro (with Carlos Ramos and Luís da Cunha).
- 1923–25. Camões School, Entroncamento (with Luís Cunha).
- 1925–27. Model houses in the Camões neighbourhood, Entroncamento.
- 1928. Passenger building, Tomar railway station
- 1930. Latino Coelho High School, Lamego.
- 1931. South and Southeast Station, Lisbon.
- 1938. S. Pedro do Sul Regional Prison (construction, 1946).
- 1939–40. Plan of the Portuguese World Exhibition; Garden and Luminous Fountain, Praça do Império; Pavilion of the Portuguese in the World; Monument to the Discoveries (with Leopoldo de Almeida).
- 1943. General plan of the University City of Coimbra; Monumental Staircase (completed in 1950).
- 1945. Standard Elétrica facilities (current headquarters of the Lisbon Metropolitan Orchestra), Av. da Índia, Lisbon (built in 1948).
- 1945. Penhas da Saúde Sanatorium.
