= South and Southeast railway station =

Former ferry terminal and railway station in Portugal

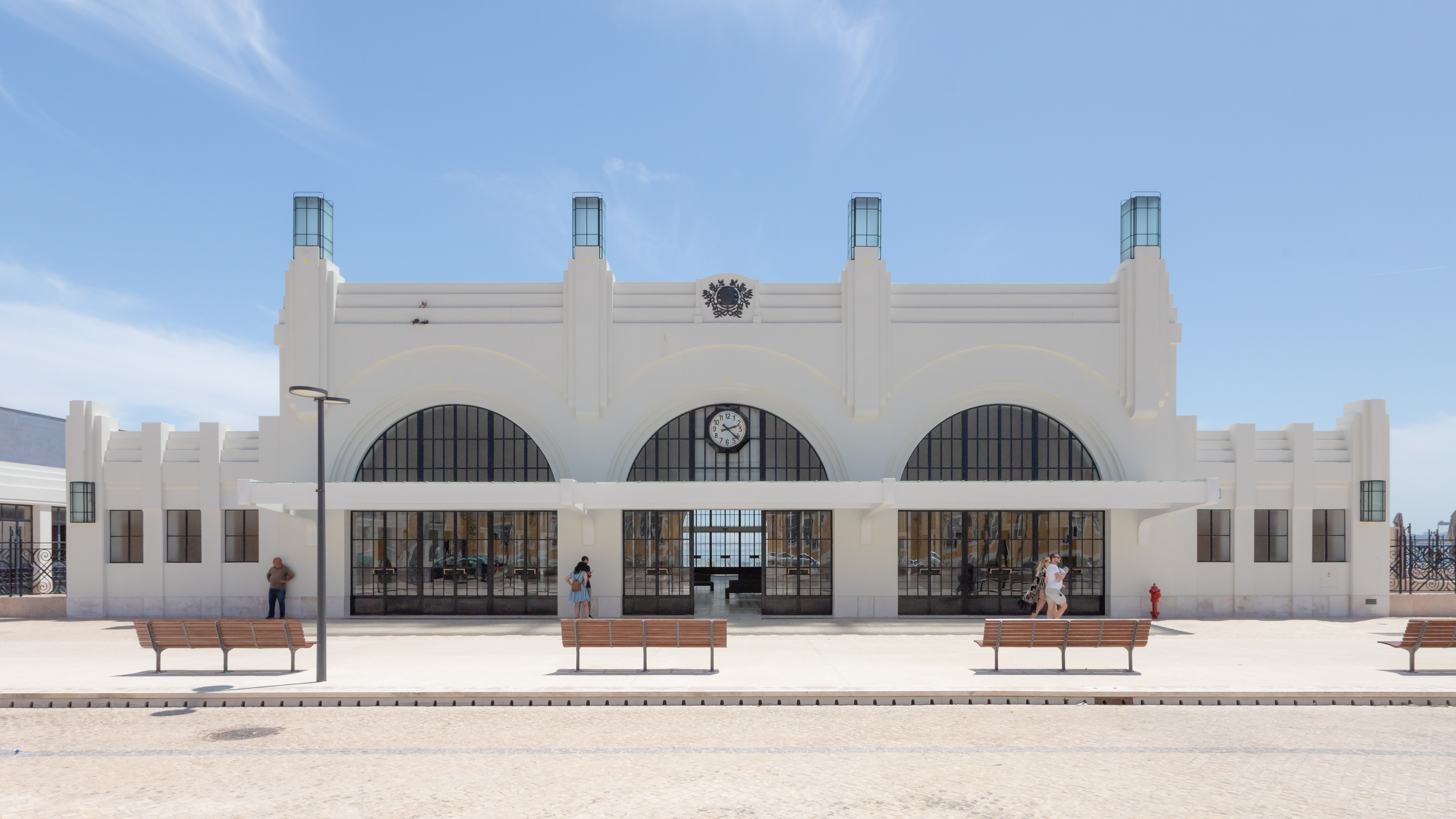
- Front view of the station
- Established: 28 May 1932; 94 years ago
- Location: Terreiro do Paço, Lisbon, Portugal
- Coordinates: 38.70684°N 9.1341°W
- Public transit access: Bus and metro

The South and Southeast railway station (Estação Ferroviária do Sul e Sueste) was a ferry terminal in the centre of Lisbon, the capital of Portugal, near the Praça do Comércio. Despite not having any trains, it was considered an integral part of the Portuguese railway network as it connected rail passengers from Lisbon to a railway station south of the Tagus river. It became redundant following the addition, in 1999, of a railway to the 25 de Abril Bridge over the Tagus, which had previously only served road traffic.

== History ==
In 1837, a contract was signed with the Companhia de Navegação do Tejo e Sado, for river transport between Lisbon and various locations along the Tagus, including on the south bank. Among the quays used was one at Terreiro do Paço, also known as the Praça do Comércio. In the mid-19th century, King Luís I launched a project to build a large rail and river interchange in Lisbon, where European railways and ships to the American continent could link up. This led to the opening of the Santa Apolónia railway station on 1 May 1865. However, trains destined to go south to the Setúbal Peninsula, parts of the Alentejo and, later, the Algarve would have had to head a considerable distance to the north before they could cross the Tagus and turn south and so passengers took ferries from the Terreiro do Paço quay to the Barreiro railway station on the south bank, which had opened in 1861.

The initial South and Southeast railway station was a very poor structure, consisting essentially of a wooden and iron shed, set on stilts. It was subsequently modified, with the wooden piling being replaced by iron. However, this building proved too small for the traffic, had sanitary problems, was uncomfortable for users, and, despite improvements to the moorings, created difficulties for the ferries to dock. At the turn of the 20th century, a programme to improve access of passengers between the south bank and Lisbon and vice versa was initiated. Plans included a new river station in Lisbon, an extension of the line from Barreiro to Cacilhas, on the south bank directly opposite Lisbon, and the acquisition of new vessels.

In 1904, the preparation of a new project for the definitive station was ordered. A few months later, it was reported that several merchants had requested the construction of both a passenger and goods embarkation and disembarkation quay on the embankment. At the end of the year, a preliminary design was presented. However, this proposal aroused some hostility among the merchants and from the National Monuments Council, which feared that the construction would distort the aesthetics of the location. As a result, development of the terminal became paralysed.

== Design and construction ==
In 1928, the idea of building a new river station was revived as it was expected that a large number of tourists would visit the city as part of the Ibero-American Exposition of 1929, to be held in Seville in Spain. A commission appointed in March almost unanimously proposed the construction of the new station on the embankment. The modernist architect, Cottinelli Telmo, who was employed by the Portuguese Railway Company, was commissioned that same year to design the station. Cottinelli designed a building with very clear forms and structures in keeping with the style of the 1930s, resisting the temptation to design in the historical style of the nearby buildings. The building features three large semicircular entrance portals. The clock above the entrance evokes the image of a "real" train station. Inside, passengers were greeted by a very large hall with a high ceiling supported by sturdy, marble-clad pillars.

During construction, several changes to the plans were made, including the replacement of superimposed blocks with reinforced concrete in the columns supporting the roof, to give more solidity to the structure of the building. Additionally, skylights were introduced to improve lighting during the day. The building was not completed in time for the Seville exposition, being inaugurated by the Portuguese president, Óscar Carmona, on 28 May 1932. Subsequent changes included the building of a covered reinforced concrete quay for the transport of fruit.

== Closure and redevelopment ==
The 25 de Abril Bridge across the Tagus was opened to road traffic in 1966, at that time known as the Salazar Bridge after the country's authoritarian leader. Although the bridge had been planned from the beginning to incorporate a railway, it was not until 1999 that a double-track railway was opened as a lower platform. From this time there was little need for the South and Southeast railway station and it gradually fell into disuse, becoming an eyesore. It was declared a Monument of Public Interest in 2012. Restoration took place around 2020, at a cost of €30 million, supervised by Ana Costa, niece of Cottinelli Telmo, the original architect. The building was reopened on 1 May 2021 as a tourist hub and as a terminal for boat tours on the Tagus.

== Gallery ==
Main north facade, with clock

North facade with commercial premises

South facade

Main hall, with marble-clad pillars, skylights and patterned flooring

Clock above the doors facing the river

Decorative metal grille

Tile panel with the coat of arms of Setúbal

Cais 1929 café, in the former first-class waiting room
