= Ramal do Seixal =

Portuguese railway line

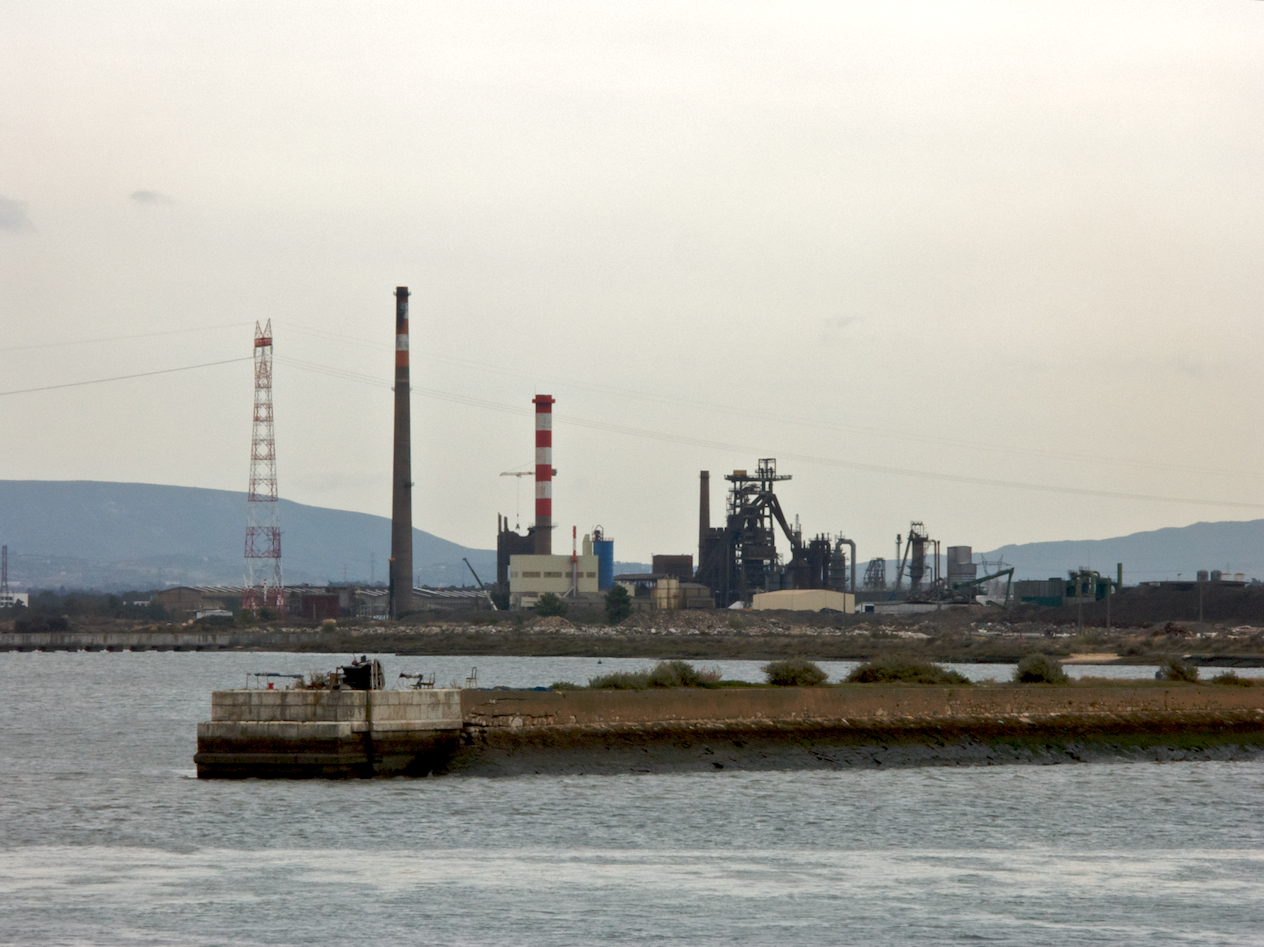
- Ramal do Seixal embankment in 2008

Overview
- Status: closed
- Termini: Barreiro-A; Seixal

Technical
- Line length: 4.4 km (2.7 mi)
- Track gauge: 1,668 mm (5 ft 5 21/32 in) Iberian gauge
Route map
Location on the network

Ramal do Seixal is a closed railway branch, which connected the stations of Barreioro-A and Seixal, in Portugal. It was opened on 29 July 1923 and closed in 1969.

== See also ==
- List of railway lines in Portugal
- History of rail transport in Portugal
