= CP Class 1300 =

Class of diesel locomotives

Class 1300
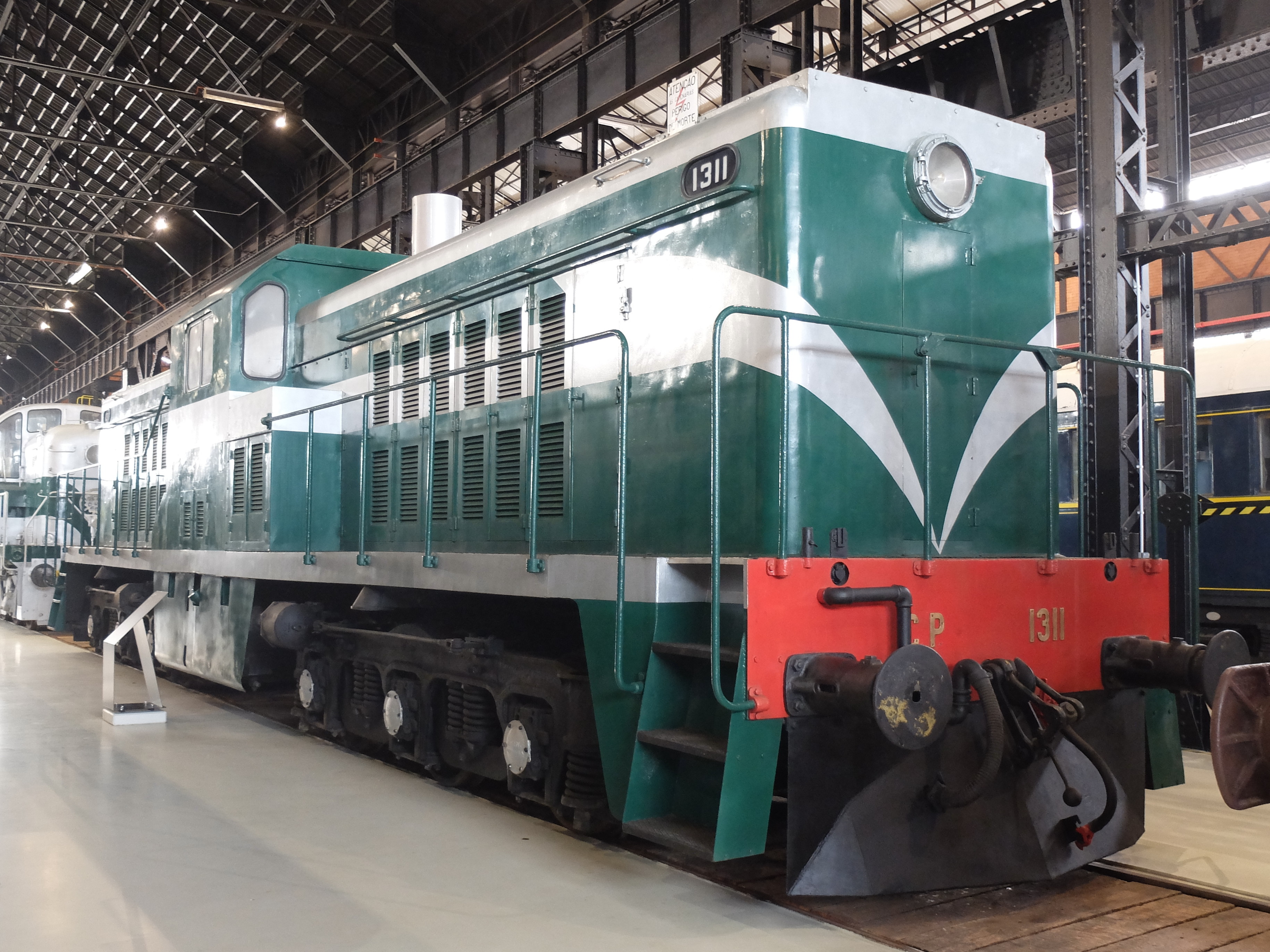
- 1311 preserved at Museu Nacional Ferroviário
Type and origin
- Power type: Diesel-electric
- Builder: Whitcomb Locomotive Company
- Model: 104DE2
- Build date: 1952
Specifications
- Configuration
  - AAR: A1A-A1A
Career
- Operators: Comboios de Portugal
- Class: Série 1300
- Locale: Portugal
- First run: 1952
- Withdrawn: 1987
- Disposition: all withdrawn

The Série 1300 were a class of diesel locomotives used by Portuguese Railways (CP). They entered service in 1952; all are now withdrawn from service.

These diesel-electric locomotives were manufactured in the US by the Whitcomb Locomotive Company in 1952, to the constructor's model 104DE2. They had a central cab and an A1A-A1A bogie designation. Electrical equipment was provided by the Westinghouse Electric Corporation. They were withdrawn from service in 1987. Although they were somewhat similar to the older ALCO-built Série 1500, difficulties in purchasing spare parts for these locomotives hastened their withdrawal.
